= Shizuoka (city) =

City in Shizuoka prefecture, Japan

Shizuoka 静岡市
- Prefecture capital and Designated city
- City of Shizuoka
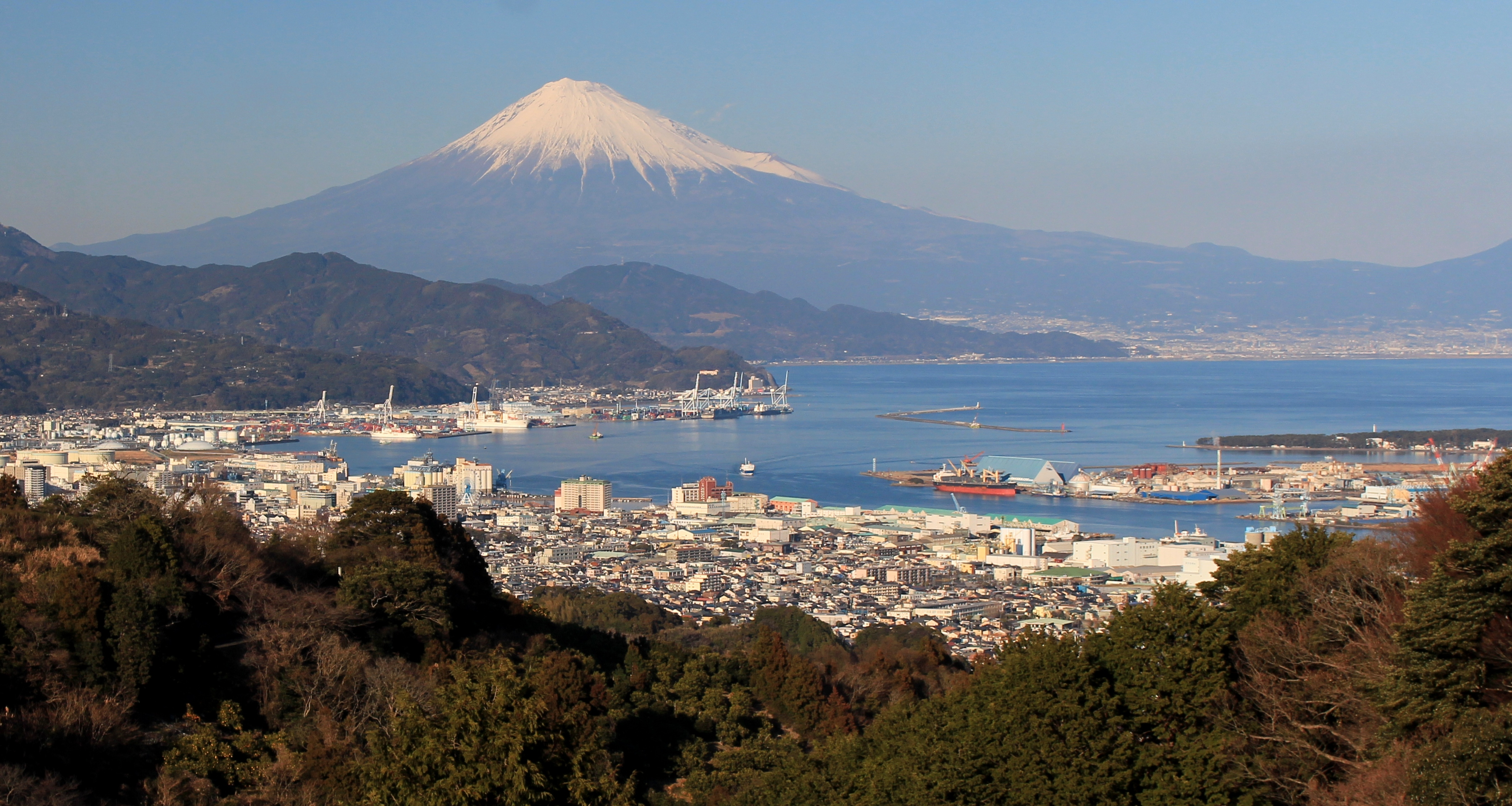
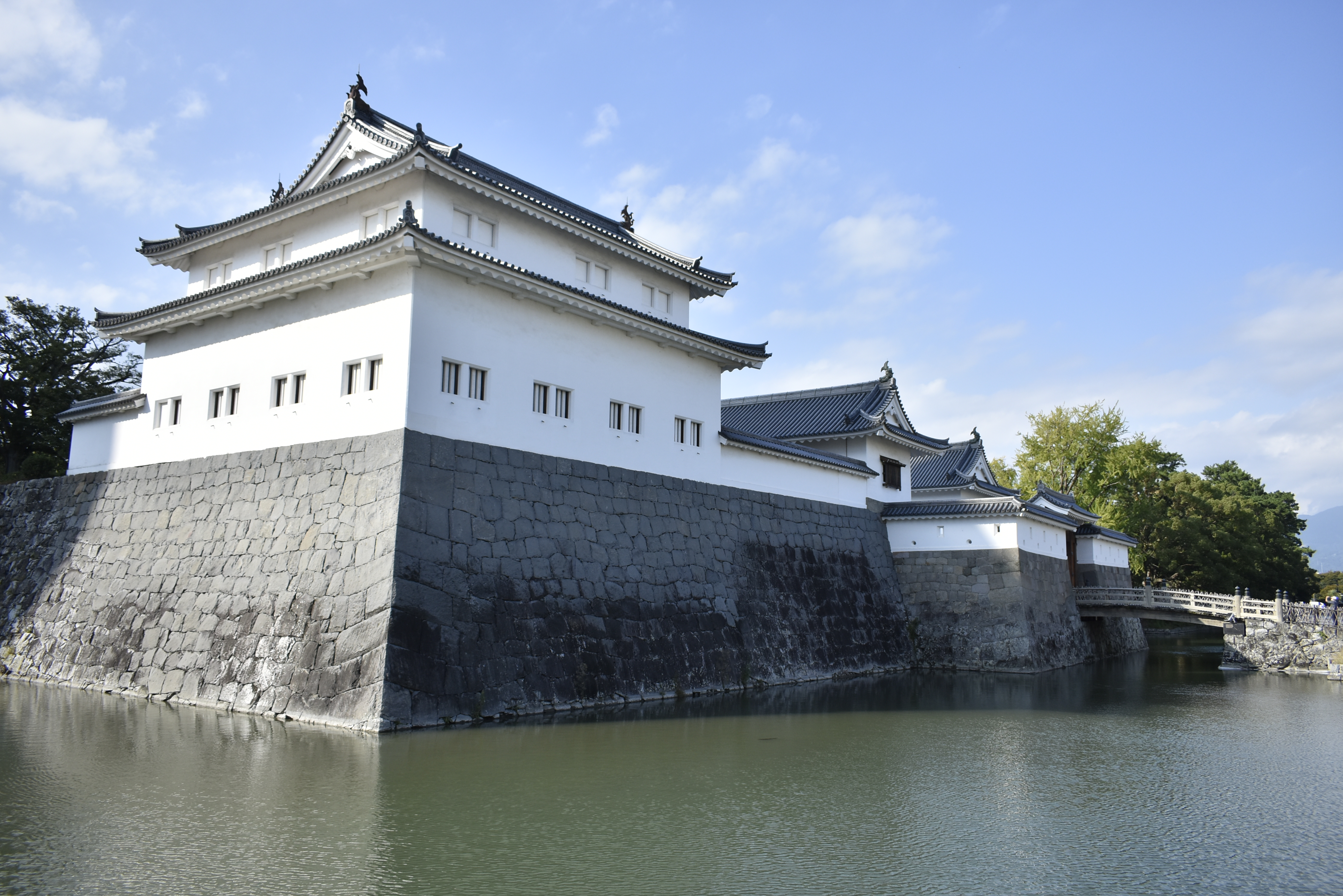
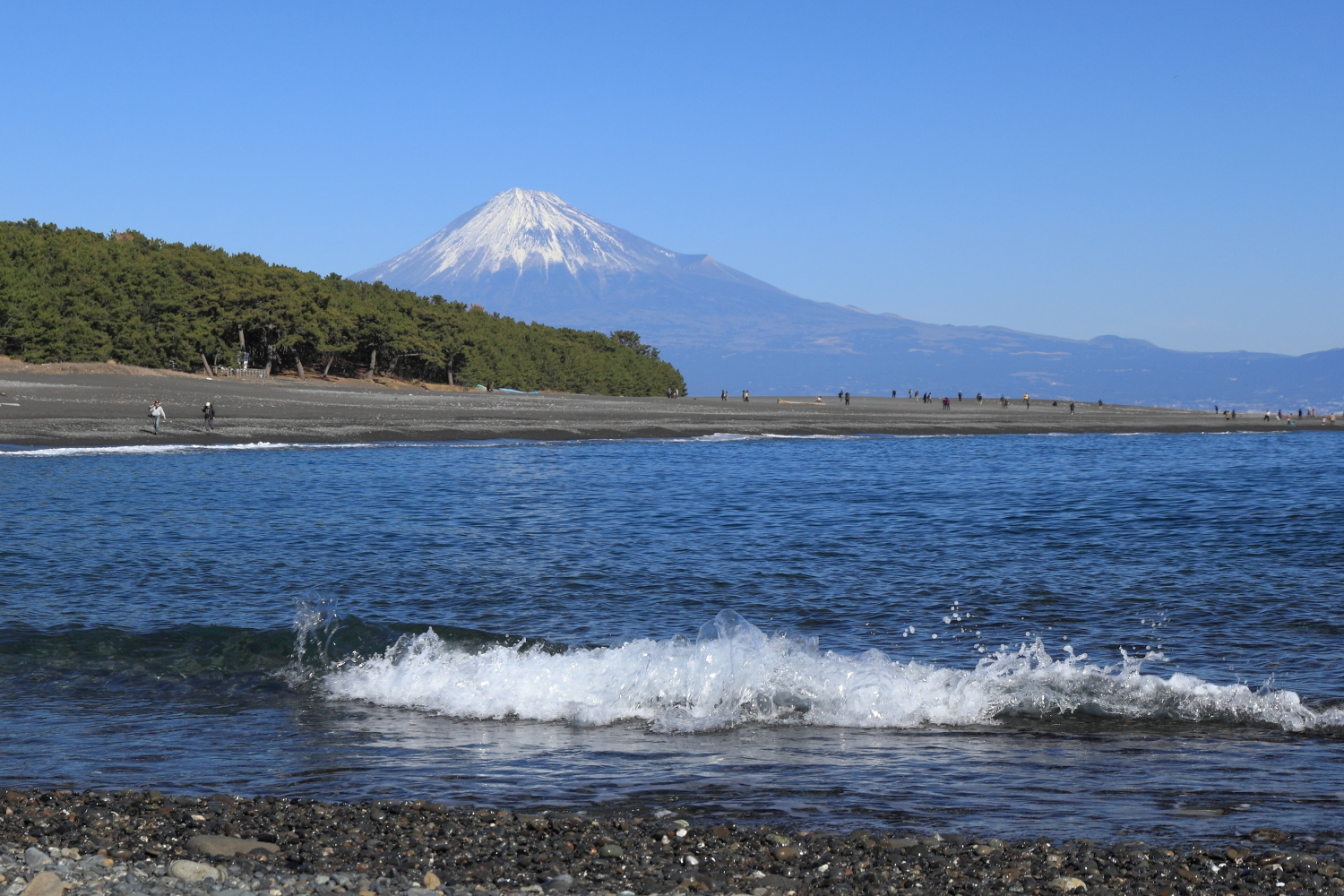
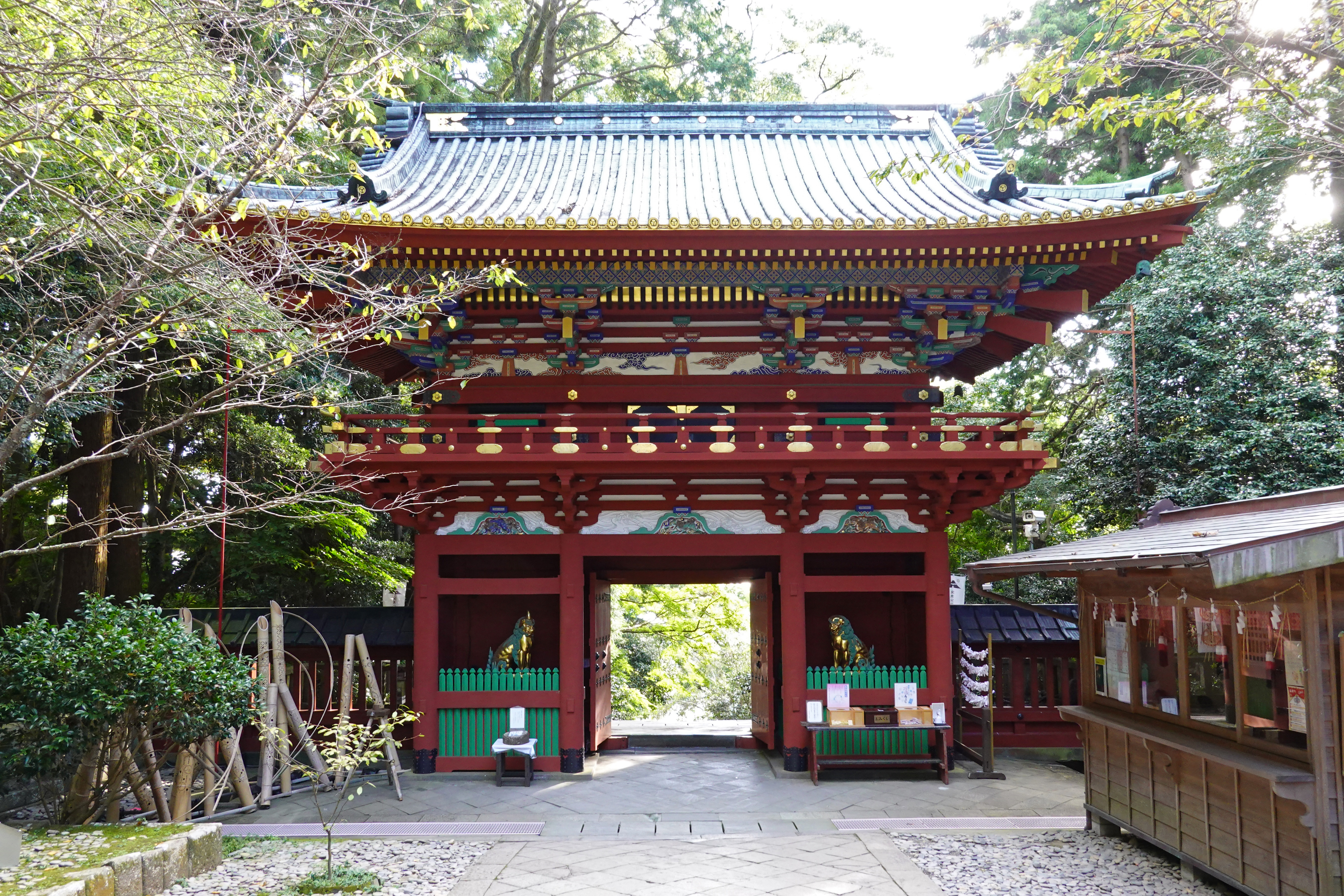
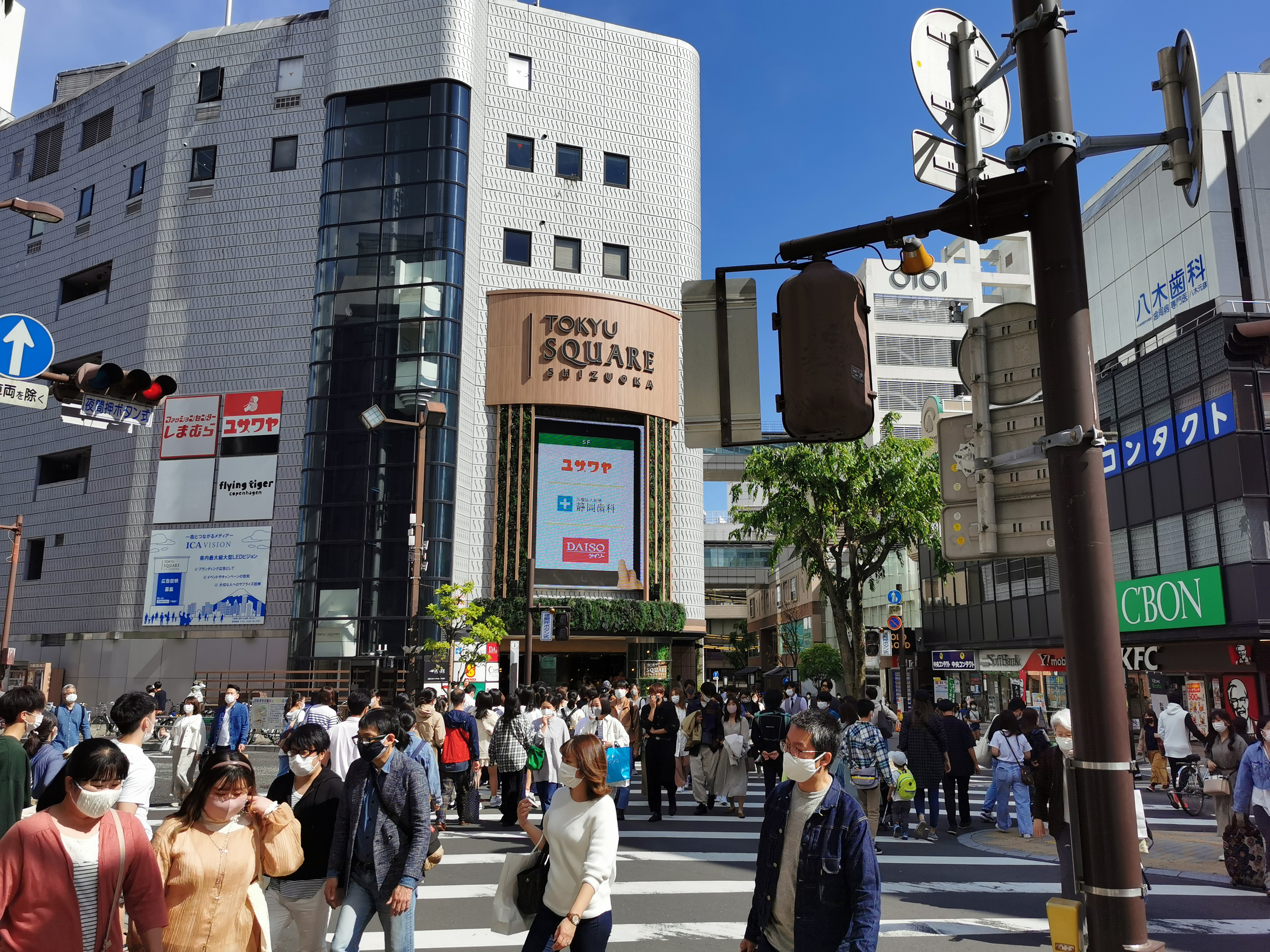
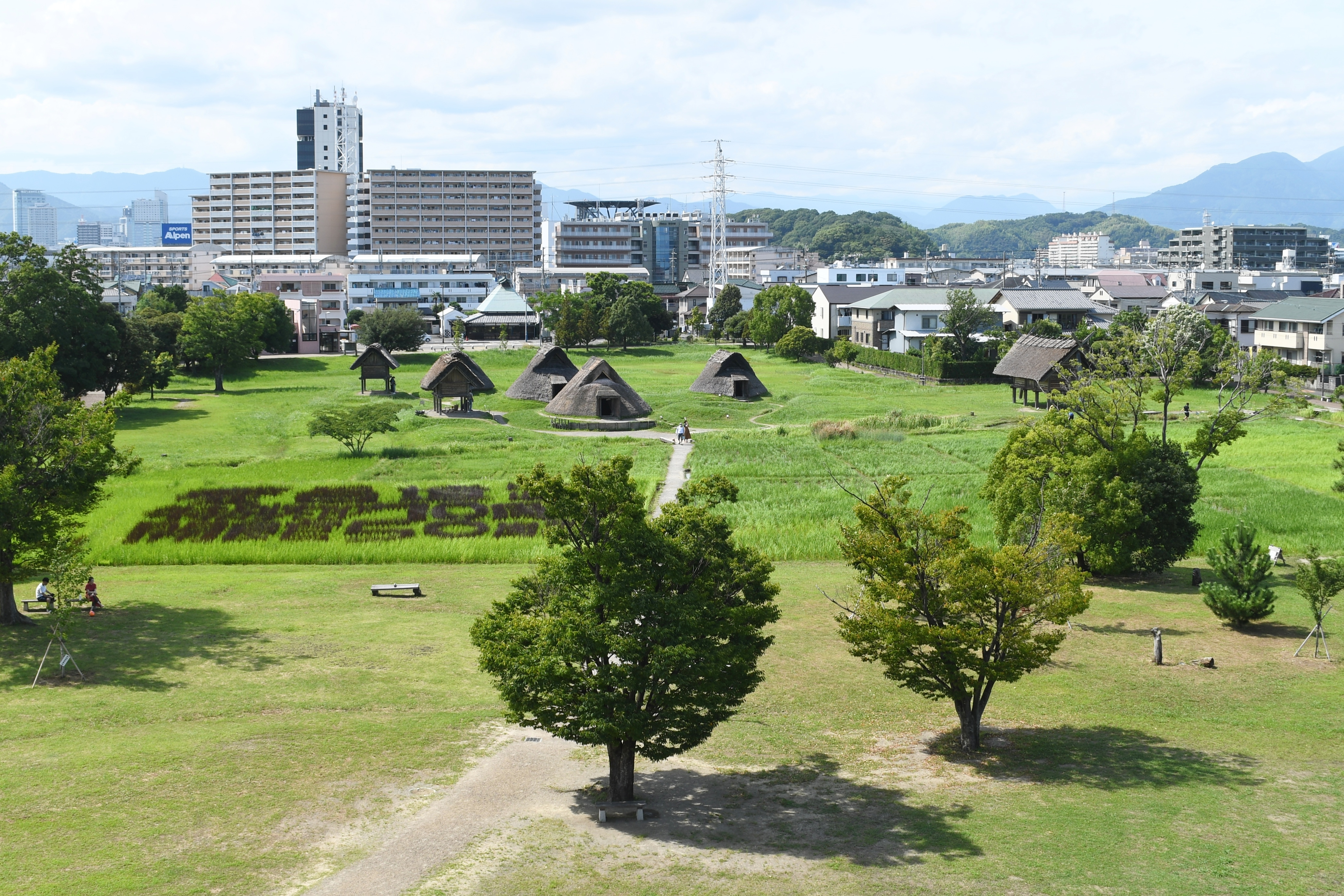
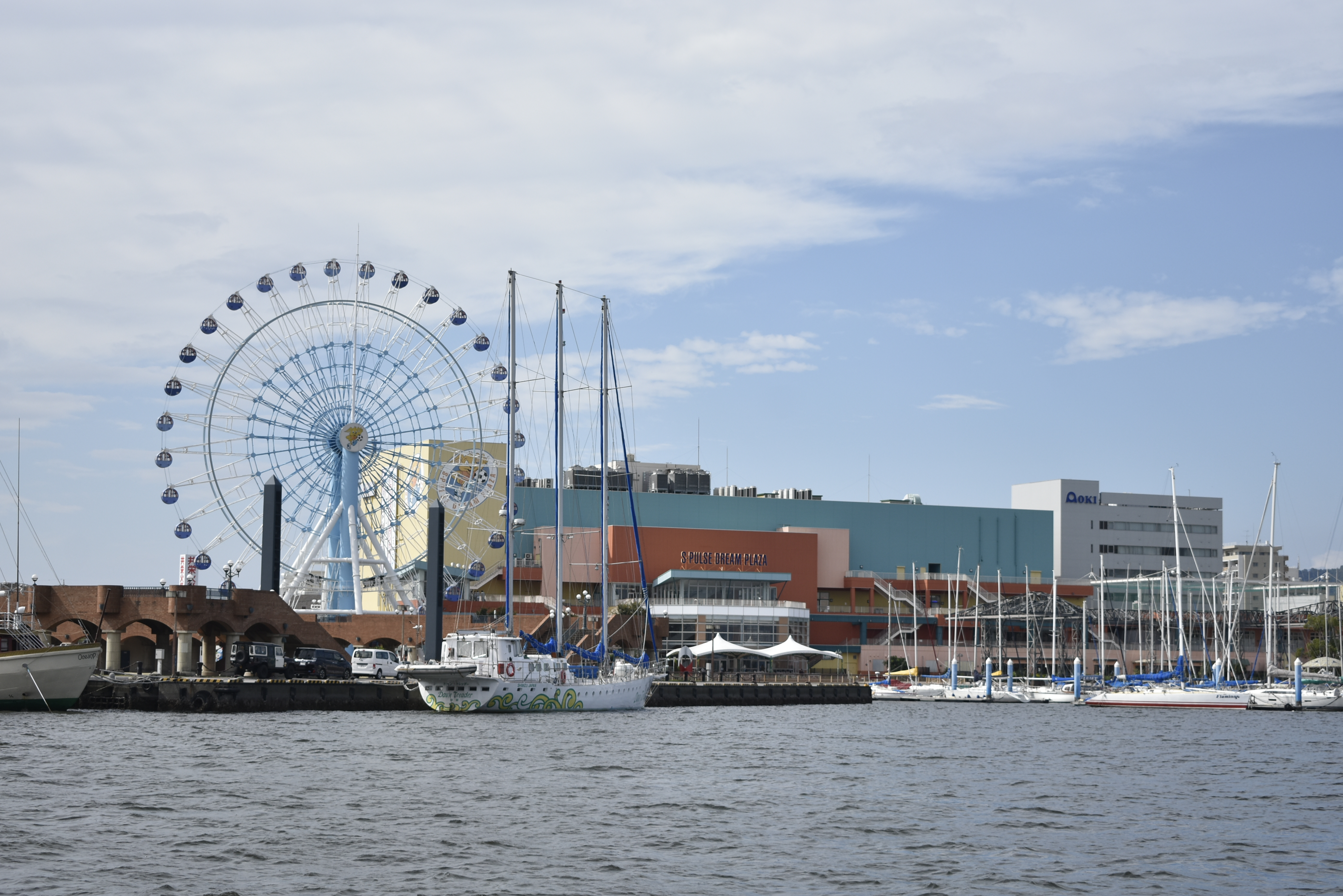
- Mount Fuji and Port of Shimizu from Nihondaira Sunpu Castle Miho no Matsubara Kunōzan Tōshō-gū Denmachō intersection Toro Site Port of Shimizu

- Flag Emblem

- Location of Shizuoka in Shizuoka Prefecture

- Coordinates: 34°58′32″N 138°22′58″E
- Country: Japan
- Region: Chūbu (Tōkai)
- Prefecture: Shizuoka Prefecture
- First official record: 663 AD
- City Status: 1 April 1889; 137 years ago

Government
  - Mayor: Takashi Namba

Area
  - Total: 1,411.90 km^{2} (545.14 sq mi)

Population (September 1, 2023)
  - Total: 677,867
  - Density: 480.110/km^{2} (1,243.48/sq mi)
- Time zone: UTC+9 (Japan Standard Time)
- Symbols
  - Tree: Flowering dogwood
  - Flower: Hollyhock
  - Bird: Common kingfisher
- Phone number: 054-254-2111
- Address: 5-1 Ōtemachi, Aoi-ku, Shizuoka-shi, Shizuoka-ken 420-8602
- Website: Official website

Shizuoka (静岡市, Shizuoka-shi; Japanese pronunciation: [ɕì.(d͡)zɨ́.ò̞.kä̀, -ó̞.kä́.ɕì]) is the capital city of Shizuoka Prefecture, Japan, and the prefecture's second-largest city in both population and area. It has been populated since prehistoric times. As of 1 September 2023, the city had an estimated population of 677,867 in 106,087 households, and a population density of 480 inhabitants per square kilometre (1,200/sq mi).

== Overview ==
The city's name is made up of two kanji, 静 shizu, meaning "still" or "calm"; and 岡 oka, meaning "hill(s)". In 1869, Shizuoka Domain was first created out of the older Sunpu Domain, and that name was retained when the city was incorporated in 1885. In 2003, Shizuoka absorbed neighboring Shimizu City (now Shimizu Ward) to create the new and expanded city of Shizuoka, briefly becoming the largest city by land area in Japan. In 2005, it became one of Japan's "designated cities".

== Geography ==
Shizuoka City lies in central Shizuoka Prefecture, about halfway between Tokyo and Nagoya along the Tōkaidō Corridor, between Suruga Bay to the south and the Minami Alps in the north. Shizuoka had the largest area of any municipality in Japan after merging with Shimizu City in April 2003, until February 2005, when Takayama in Gifu Prefecture superseded it by merging with nine surrounding municipalities.

The total area of the city is 1,411.90 km^{2} (545.14 sq mi). Shizuoka is the 5th largest city in Japan in terms of geographic area after Takayama, Hamamatsu, Nikkō, and Kitami. It is also the 2nd largest city in Shizuoka Prefecture in terms of both geographic area and population after Hamamatsu, but ranks higher as an Urban Employment Area, and leads as a metropolitan area and business region.

The fan-like shape of the Shizuoka Plain and Miho Peninsula were formed over the ages by the fast-flowing Abe River, carrying along collapsed sand and earth. These areas form the foundations of the city today. The isolated Mount Kunō separates the Suruga coastline from the Shimizu coastline.

=== Basic data ===
- Area of densely populated region
  - 103.99 km^{2} (40.15 sq mi)
- Urban planning area
  - 234.80 km^{2} (90.66 sq mi)
- Area zoned for urbanization
  - 104.0 km^{2} (40.2 sq mi)

=== Nature ===
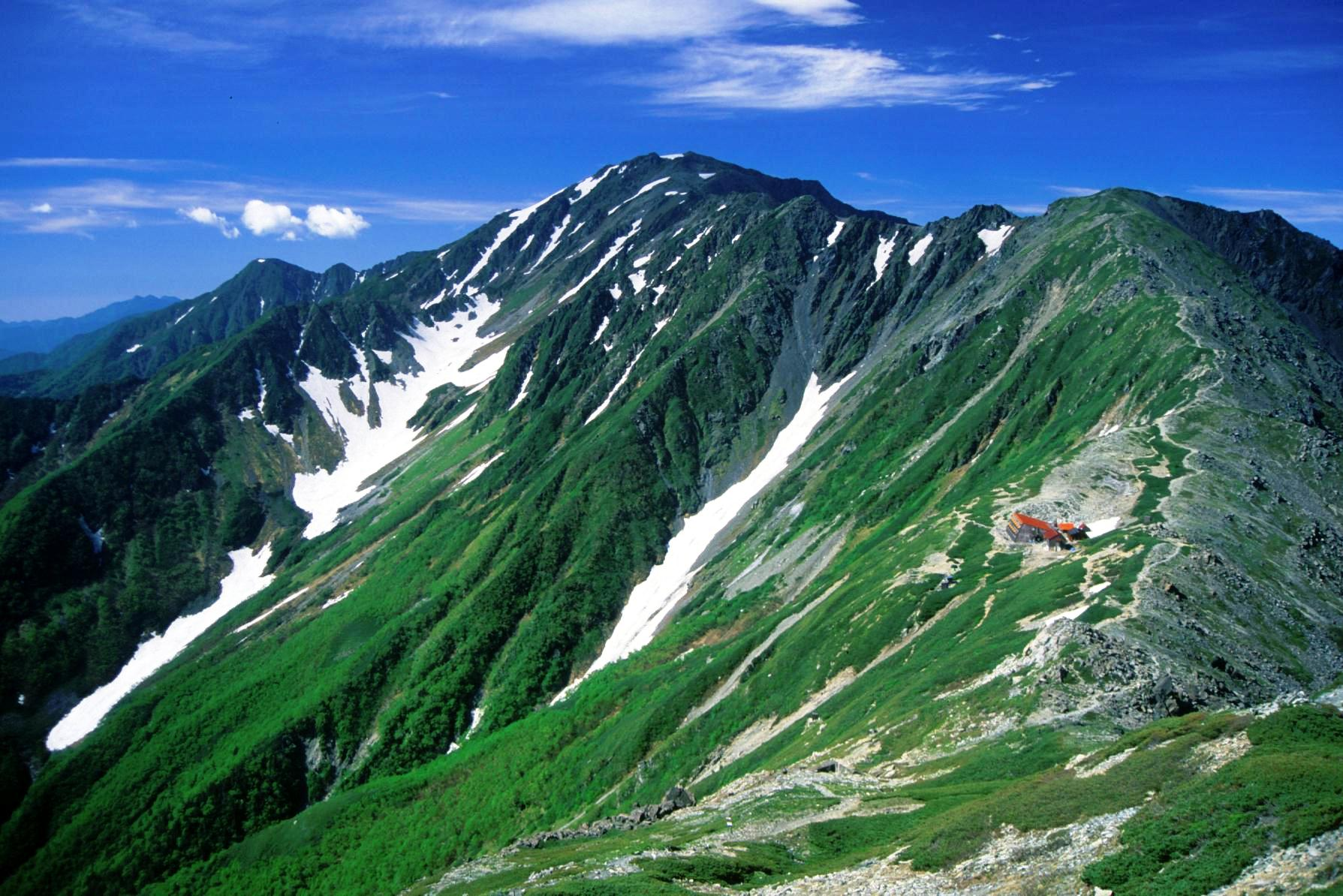
Mount Aino, one of the 100 Famous Japanese Mountains, and the fourth tallest peak in Japan

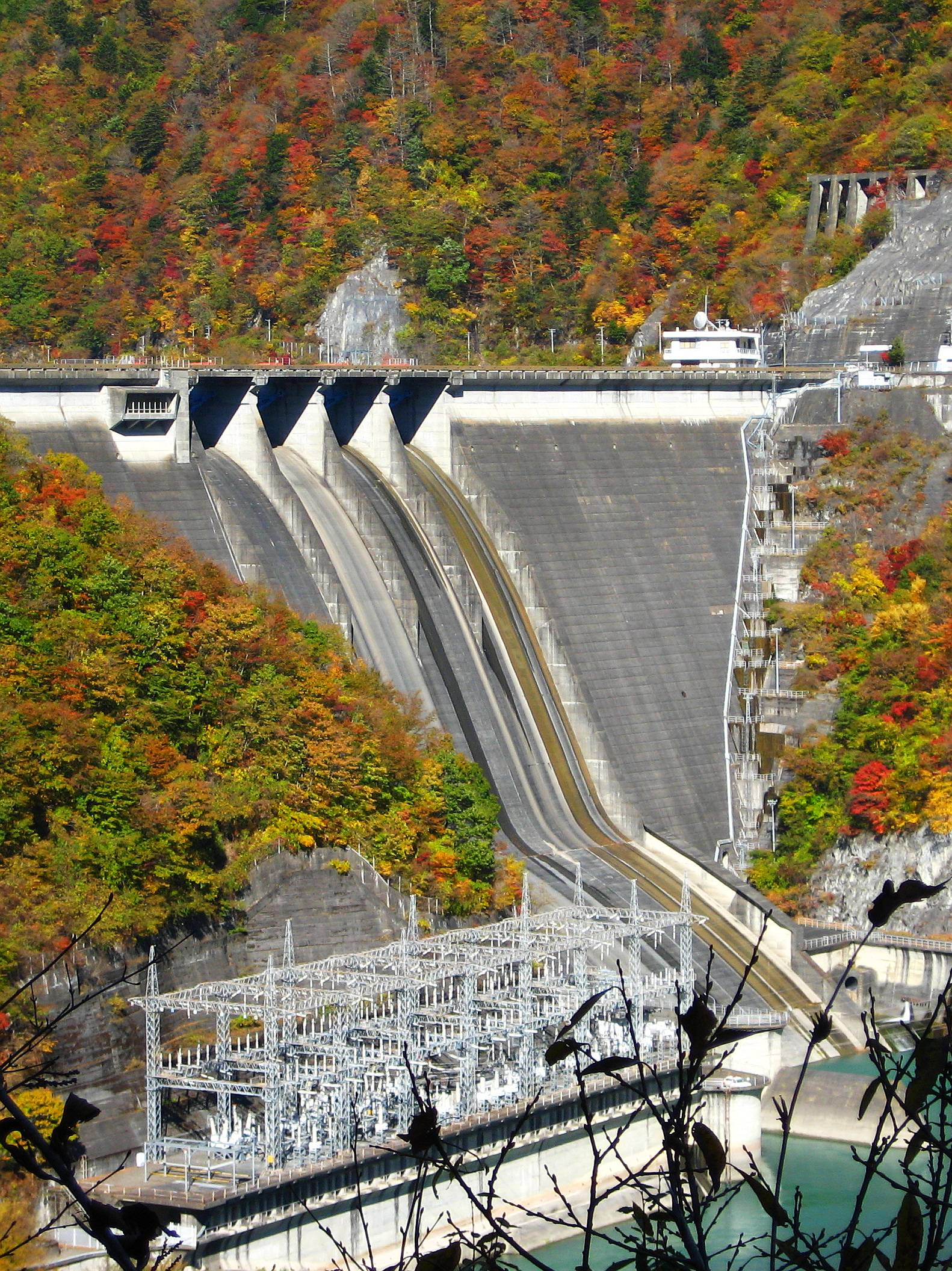
The hydroelectric Hatanagi-I Dam—tallest concrete gravity dam in the world

==== Mountains ====
- Mount Aino (間ノ岳, Aino-dake)
- Mount Shiomi (塩見岳, Shiomi-dake)
- Mount Warusawa (悪沢岳(荒川岳), Warusawa-dake (Arakawa-dake))
- Mount Akaishi (赤石岳, Akaishi-dake)
- Mount Hijiri (聖岳, Hijiri-dake)
- Mount Tekari (光岳, Tekari-dake)
- Mount Yanbushi (山伏, Yanbushi)
- Mount Daimugen (大無間山, Daimugen-zan)
- Mankan Pass (満観峠, Mankan-tōge)
- Mount Mafuji (真富士山, Mafuji-san)
- Mount Jūmai (十枚山, Jūmai-san)
- Mount Ryūsō (竜爪山, Ryūsō-zan)
- Mount Shizuhata (賤機山, Shizuhata-yama)
- Mount Yatsu (谷津山, Yatsu-yama)
- Mount Yahata (八幡山, Yahata-san)
- Mount Udo (Nihondaira) (有度山(日本平), Udo-san (Nihondaira))
- Mount Kajiwara (梶原山, Kajiwara-yama)
- Mount Satta (Satta Pass) (薩埵山(薩埵峠), Satta-yama (Satta-tōge))
- Mount Hamaishi (浜石岳, Hamaishi-dake)
- Mount Ōmaru (大丸山, Ōmaru-yama)
- Mount Ōhira (大平山, Ōhira-yama)

==== Rivers ====
- Ōi River (大井川, Ōi-gawa) (upstream)
- Abe River (安倍川)
- Warashina River (藁科川, Warashina-gawa)
- Mariko River (丸子川, Mariko-gawa)
- Tomoe River (巴川, Tomoe-gawa)
- Ōya River Drainage Ditch (大谷川放水路, Ōya-gawa Hōsui-ro)
- Nagao River (長尾川, Nagao-gawa)
- Fuji River (富士川, Fuji-kawa)
- Okitsu River (興津川, Okitsu-gawa)
- Ōzawa River (大沢川, Ōzawa-gawa)
- Ihara River (庵原川, Ihara-gawa)
- Yamakiri River (山切川, Yamakiri-gawa)
- Nakagōchi River (中河内川, Nakagōchi-gawa)
- Ōhashi River (大橋川, Ōhashi-gawa)
- Kogōchi River (小河内川(興津川支流), Kogōchi-gawa)

==== Lakes ====
- Lake Ikawa (井川湖, Ikawa-ko) (Ikawa Dam)
- Lake Hatanagi (畑薙湖, Hatanagi-ko) (Hatanagi-I Dam)
- Asahata Marsh (Asahata Anti-flood Pond) (麻機沼(麻機遊水地), Asahata-numa (Asahata Yūsuichi))
- Kujira Pond (鯨ヶ池, Kujira-ike)
- Udosaka Pond (有東坂池, Udosaka-ike)
- Futatsu Pond (Oshika Pond) (二ツ池(小鹿池), Futatsu-ike (Oshika-ike))
- Funakoshi Dike (船越堤, Funakoshi-tsutsumi)

=== Climate ===
On the south-central Pacific coast Shizuoka has a humid subtropical climate (Köppen climate classification Cfa), which is hot and humid in the summer, and rarely snows in the winter. It is close to the warm Kuroshio Current and is wet even by Japanese standards with only slightly less precipitation than Kanazawa on the opposite side of Honshū, but it is paradoxically the sunniest of Japan's major cities owing to the absence of summer fog and its sheltered location from the northwesterly winds off the Sea of Japan. Further north, the mountainous Ikawa area is part of the Japanese snow country, where there are ski areas.

Climate data for Shizuoka (1991−2020 normals, extremes 1940−present)
Month	Jan	Feb	Mar	Apr	May	Jun	Jul	Aug	Sep	Oct	Nov	Dec	Year
Record high °C (°F)	25.7 (78.3)	26.2 (79.2)	28.2 (82.8)	33.3 (91.9)	33.9 (93.0)	38.3 (100.9)	40.0 (104.0)	41.4 (106.5)	39.2 (102.6)	33.9 (93.0)	28.0 (82.4)	24.8 (76.6)	41.4 (106.5)
Mean maximum °C (°F)	17.4 (63.3)	20.2 (68.4)	22.7 (72.9)	26.6 (79.9)	30.0 (86.0)	33.0 (91.4)	35.5 (95.9)	36.0 (96.8)	33.6 (92.5)	29.9 (85.8)	24.3 (75.7)	20.1 (68.2)	36.7 (98.1)
Mean daily maximum °C (°F)	11.7 (53.1)	12.6 (54.7)	15.5 (59.9)	19.8 (67.6)	23.5 (74.3)	26.1 (79.0)	29.9 (85.8)	31.3 (88.3)	28.4 (83.1)	23.6 (74.5)	18.8 (65.8)	14.1 (57.4)	21.3 (70.3)
Daily mean °C (°F)	6.9 (44.4)	7.7 (45.9)	10.7 (51.3)	15.2 (59.4)	19.2 (66.6)	22.4 (72.3)	26.1 (79.0)	27.4 (81.3)	24.5 (76.1)	19.4 (66.9)	14.3 (57.7)	9.3 (48.7)	16.9 (62.4)
Mean daily minimum °C (°F)	2.1 (35.8)	2.9 (37.2)	6.0 (42.8)	10.6 (51.1)	15.1 (59.2)	19.2 (66.6)	23.1 (73.6)	24.2 (75.6)	21.1 (70.0)	15.6 (60.1)	9.9 (49.8)	4.6 (40.3)	12.9 (55.2)
Mean minimum °C (°F)	−2.2 (28.0)	−2.0 (28.4)	0.4 (32.7)	4.4 (39.9)	10.4 (50.7)	15.1 (59.2)	19.7 (67.5)	21.0 (69.8)	16.2 (61.2)	10.3 (50.5)	4.1 (39.4)	−0.8 (30.6)	−2.9 (26.8)
Record low °C (°F)	−6.8 (19.8)	−5.8 (21.6)	−4.6 (23.7)	−1.4 (29.5)	5.1 (41.2)	12.5 (54.5)	15.4 (59.7)	16.9 (62.4)	10.6 (51.1)	3.9 (39.0)	−1.7 (28.9)	−5.1 (22.8)	−6.8 (19.8)
Average precipitation mm (inches)	79.6 (3.13)	105.3 (4.15)	207.1 (8.15)	222.2 (8.75)	215.3 (8.48)	268.9 (10.59)	296.6 (11.68)	186.5 (7.34)	280.6 (11.05)	250.3 (9.85)	134.2 (5.28)	80.7 (3.18)	2,327.3 (91.63)
Average snowfall cm (inches)	0 (0)	0 (0)	0 (0)	0 (0)	0 (0)	0 (0)	0 (0)	0 (0)	0 (0)	0 (0)	0 (0)	0 (0)	0 (0)
Average precipitation days (≥ 0.5 mm)	5.8	6.5	10.2	10.5	10.9	13.6	12.9	10.6	12.8	10.9	7.6	6.1	118.3
Average relative humidity (%)	57	57	62	65	71	77	79	76	75	71	67	60	68
Mean monthly sunshine hours	207.9	187.5	189.9	189.7	192.0	135.9	157.9	201.8	157.3	157.7	173.3	200.5	2,151.5
Source: Japan Meteorological Agency

=== Area ===
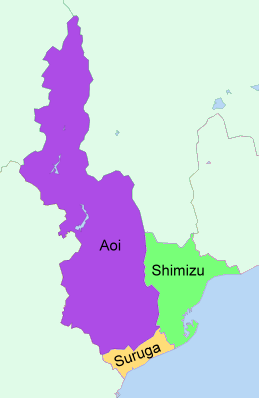
Wards of Shizuoka

==== Wards ====
Aoi Ward (葵区, Aoi-ku)
Administrative center, made up of the former Shizuoka north of the Tōkaidō Main Line excluding Osada district
Suruga Ward (駿河区, Suruga-ku)
Former Shizuoka south of the Tōkaidō Main Line and Osada district
Shimizu Ward (清水区, Shimizu-ku)
Former city of Shimizu and towns of Kanbara and Yui.

==== Administrative district "image colours" ====
On 22 December 2006, colours and logos were established for each of the wards.

Aoi Ward	■ Aoi Ward Green
Suruga Ward	■ Suruga Ward Red
Shimizu Ward	■ Shimizu Ward Blue

=== Demographics ===
As of August 2019, the city had an estimated population of 704,989 in 286,013 households and a population density of 507 inhabitants per square kilometre (1,310/sq mi).

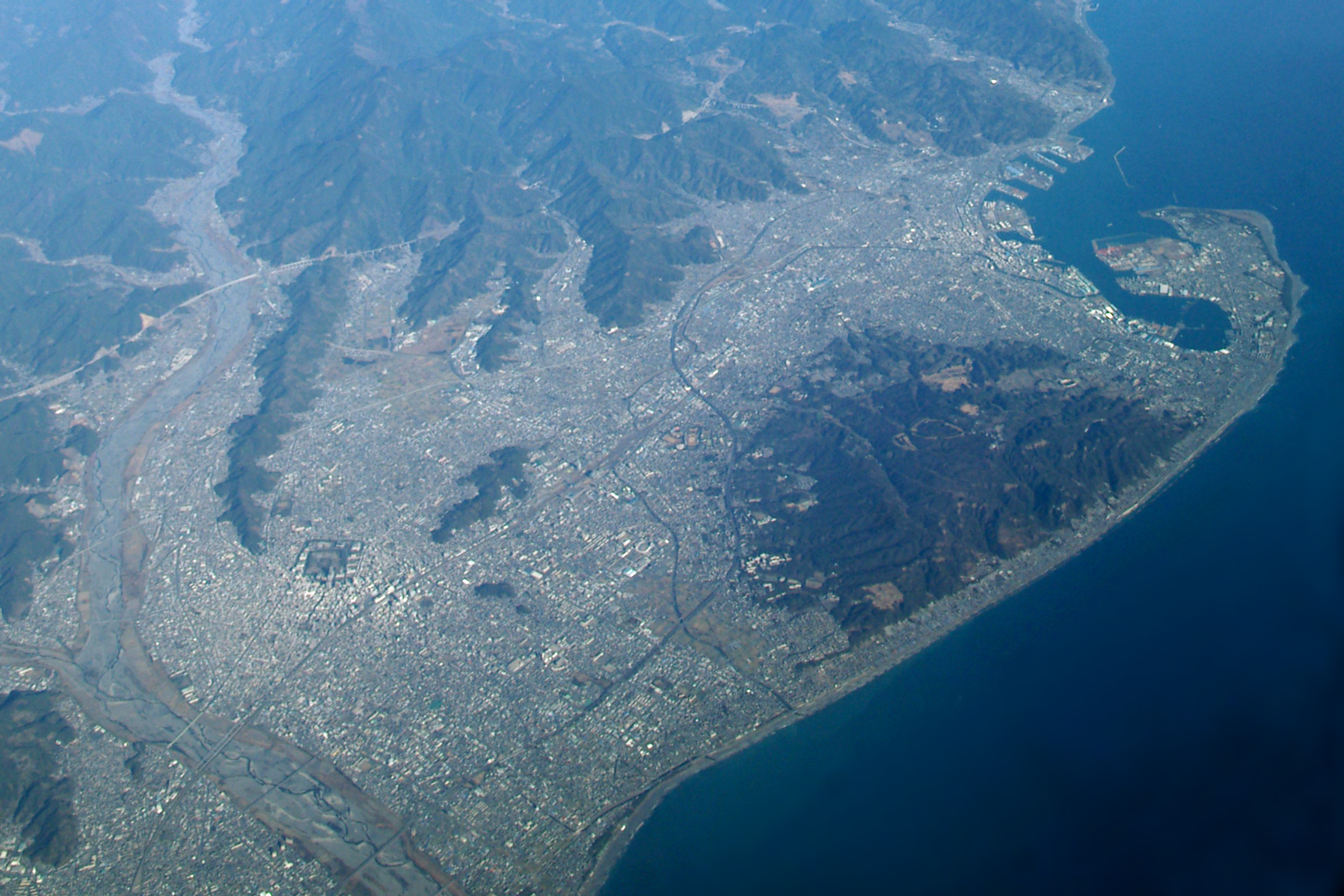
Shizuoka City seen from the South

Demographic	Population	As of
Male	343,339	August 2019
Female	361,651	August 2019
Households	286,013	August 2019
Foreign	9,389	May 2019
Total	704,989	August 2019

==== Historic population ====
Per Japanese census data, the population of Shizuoka has been declining slowly since 1990.

Historical population
Year	Pop.	±%
1940	395,189	—
1950	467,782	+18.4%
1960	576,482	+23.2%
1970	681,797	+18.3%
1980	727,260	+6.7%
1990	739,300	+1.7%
2000	729,980	−1.3%
2010	716,328	−1.9%
2020	693,389	−3.2%

=== Bordering municipalities ===
Shizuoka Prefecture

- Fuji
- Fujieda
- Fujinomiya
- Kawanehon (Haibara District)
- Shimada
- Yaizu

Yamanashi Prefecture

- Hayakawa (Minamikoma District)
- Minami-Alps
- Minobu (Minamikoma District)
- Nanbu (Minamikoma District)

Nagano Prefecture

- Iida
- Ina
- Ōshika (Shimoina District)

== History ==
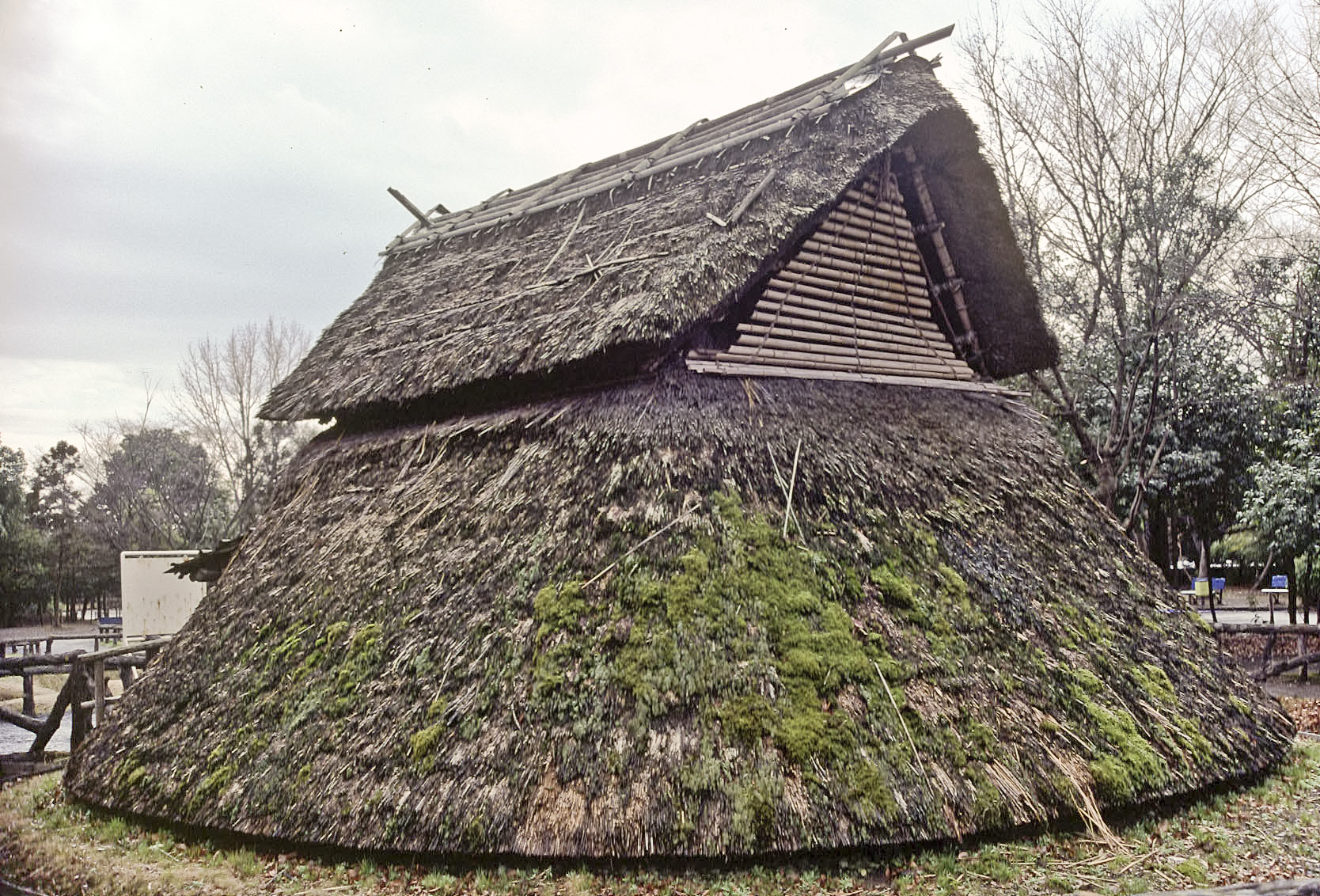
Reconstructed building at the Toro archeological site

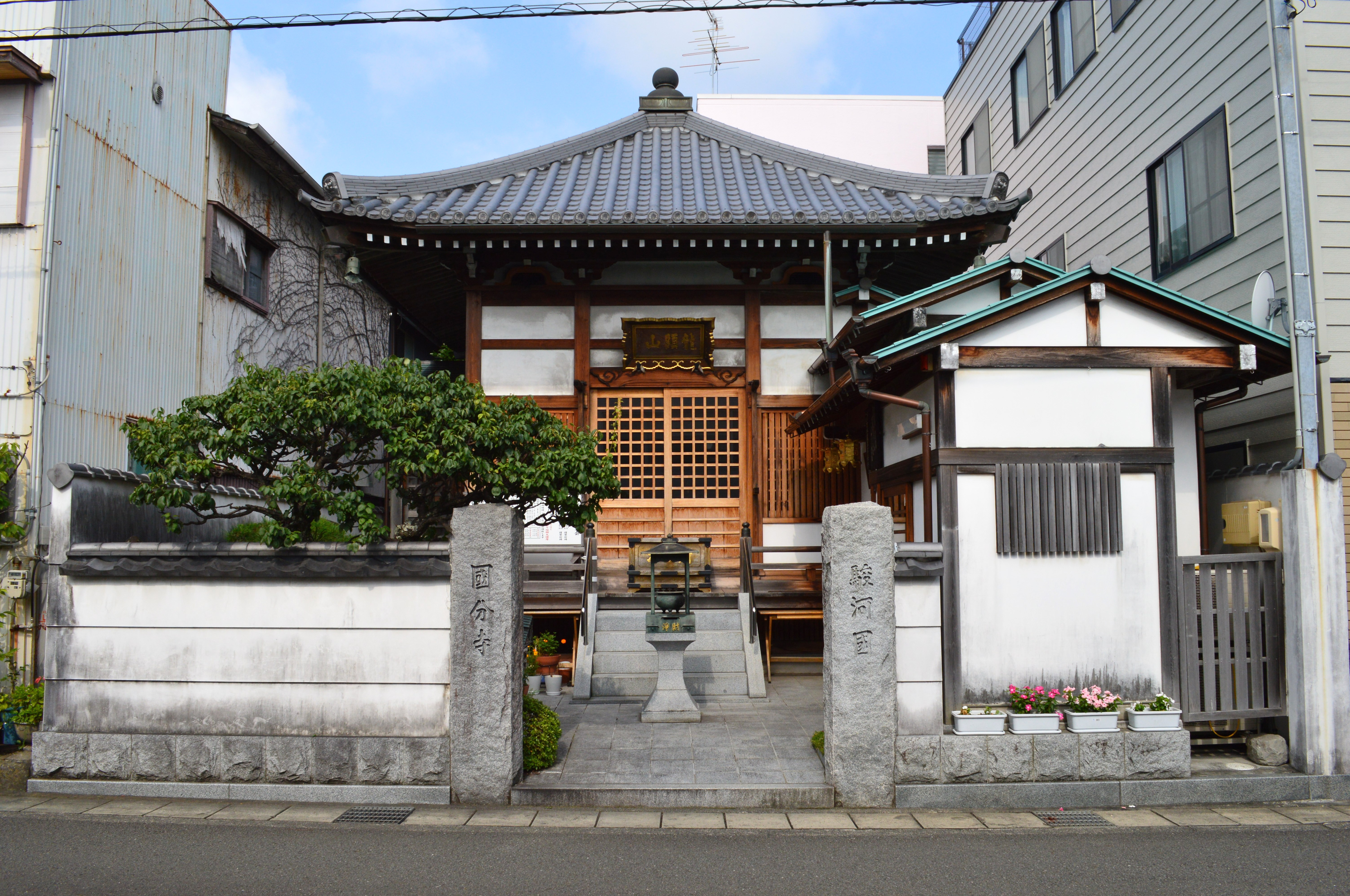
Suruga Kokubunji

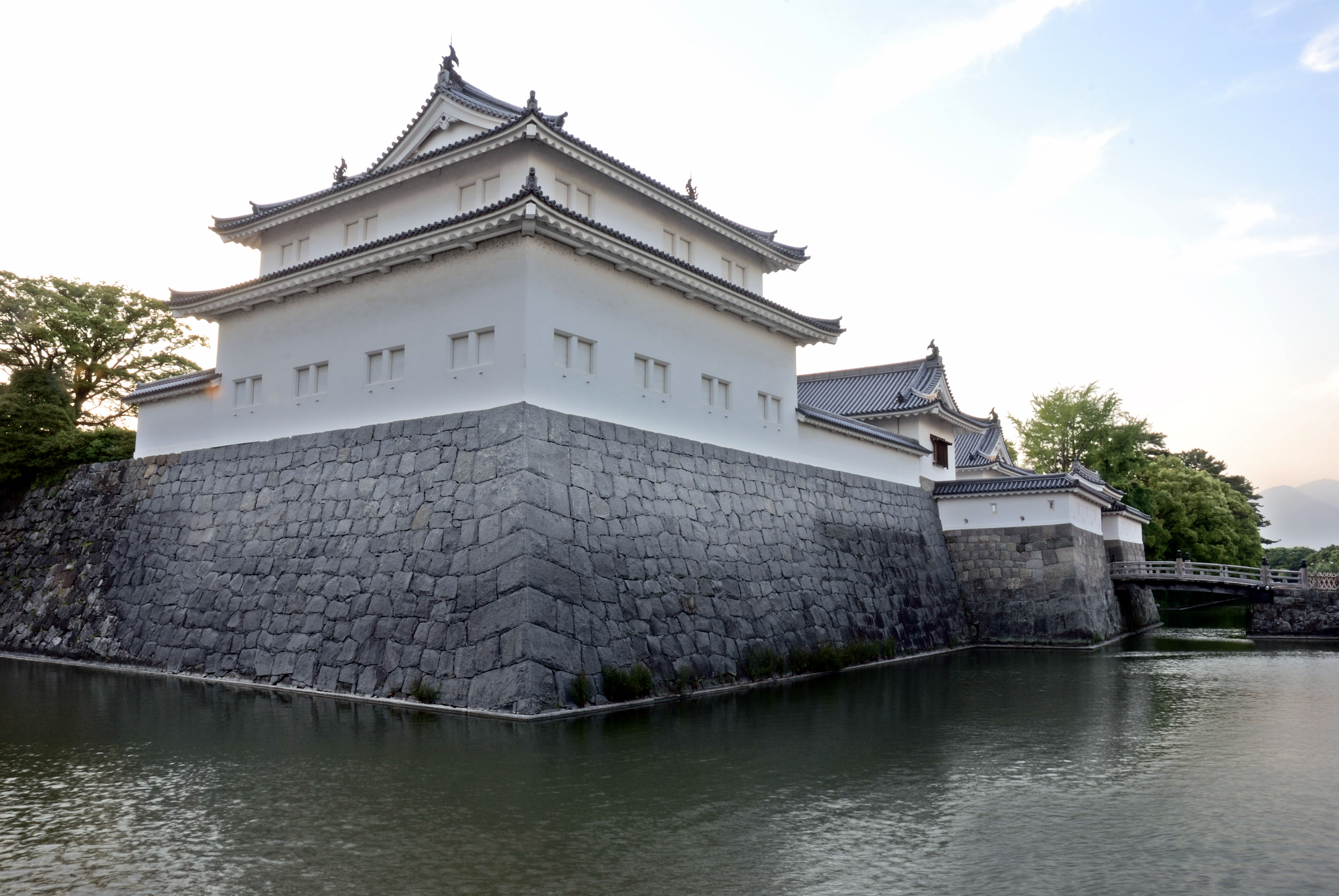
Reconstructed Tatsumi yagura of Sunpu Castle

=== Ancient history ===
The area that is now the city of Shizuoka has been inhabited since prehistoric times. Numerous kofun have been found within the city limits, and the Toro archaeological site indicates that a major Yayoi period (circa 400 BC–300 AD) settlement existed in what is now part of the central city area.

Suruga was established as a province of Japan in the early Nara period. At some point between the year 701 and 710, the provincial capital was relocated from what is now Numazu, to a more central location on the banks of the Abe River at a location named Sunpu (駿府) (a contraction of "Suruga no Kokufu" (駿河の国府)) or alternatively "Fuchū" (府中).

=== Pre-modern Shizuoka ===
During the Muromachi period, Sunpu was the capital of the Imagawa clan. The Imagawa were defeated at the Battle of Okehazama, and Sunpu was subsequently ruled by Takeda Shingen, followed by Tokugawa Ieyasu. However, Toyotomi Hideyoshi relocated Ieyasu, and installed Nakamura Kazutada to rule Sunpu. After the Toyotomi were defeated in the Battle of Sekigahara, Ieyasu recovered Sunpu, reassigning it to his own retainer, Naitō Nobunari in 1601. This marked the start of Sunpu Domain.

In April 1606, Ieyasu officially retired from the post of shōgun, and retired to Sunpu, where he established a secondary court, from which he could influence Shōgun Tokugawa Hidetada from behind the scenes. Subsequently, aside for brief periods, Sunpu was tenryō (territory under direct administration by the Shogunate), ruled by the Sunpu jōdai (駿府城代), an appointed official based in Sunpu.

=== From the Meiji period to World War II ===
In 1869, after the fall of the Tokugawa shogunate, the former shogunal line, headed by Tokugawa Iesato was sent to Sunpu and assigned the short-lived Sunpu Domain. The same year, Sunpu was renamed "Shizuoka". Shizuoka Domain became Shizuoka Prefecture with the abolition of the han system in 1871, which was expanded in 1876 through merger with the former Hamamatsu Prefecture and western portions of Ashigaru Prefecture in 1876. Shizuoka Station on the Tōkaidō Main Line was opened on 1 February 1889. The same day, a fire burned down most of downtown Shizuoka.

The modern city was founded on 1 April 1889. At the time, the population was 37,681, and Shizuoka was one of the first 31 cities established in Japan.

An electric tram service began in 1911. In 1914, due to heavy rains caused by a typhoon, the Abe River flooded, inundating the downtown area. In the national census of 1920, the population of Shizuoka was 74,093. The area of the city continued to expand through the 1920s and 1930s through merger with outlying towns and villages. In 1935, the city was struck by a 6.4 magnitude earthquake, resulting in much damage. Although soon rebuilt, a large fire in 1940 again destroyed much of the center of the city.

During World War II, Shizuoka lacked targets of major military significance, and was initially only lightly bombed during several American air raids. However, in a major firebombing raid of 19 June 1945, the city suffered an extreme amount of damage with high civilian casualties.

=== Post-war Shizuoka ===
The area of the city continued to expand through the 1950s and 1960s through merger with outlying towns and villages. On 1 October 1964, the Tōkaidō Shinkansen began services to Shizuoka, and on 25 April 1969 the city was connected to the Tōmei Expressway. On 7 July 1974, the Abe River flooded, and landslides occurred during heavy rains, killing 23 people. On 16 August 1980, a major gas leak in an underground shopping center near Shizuoka Station resulted in an explosion, killing 15 people and seriously injuring 233 others. The Shizuoka City Hall moved to new premises in 1986. On 1 April 1992, Shizuoka was designated a core city by the central government, giving it increased autonomy.

The 1 April 2003 merger with Shimizu City (current Shimizu Ward) greatly expanded the area and population of Shizuoka, which then became a designated city on 1 April 2005, and was divided into three wards.

Despite being somewhat geographically isolated from the rest of the city, the town of Kanbara (from Ihara District) was merged into Shizuoka on 31 March 2006, becoming part of Shimizu-ku. On 1 November 2008, the town of Yui (also from Ihara District) was also merged into Shimizu-ku, resulting in the dissolution of Ihara District.

== Government ==
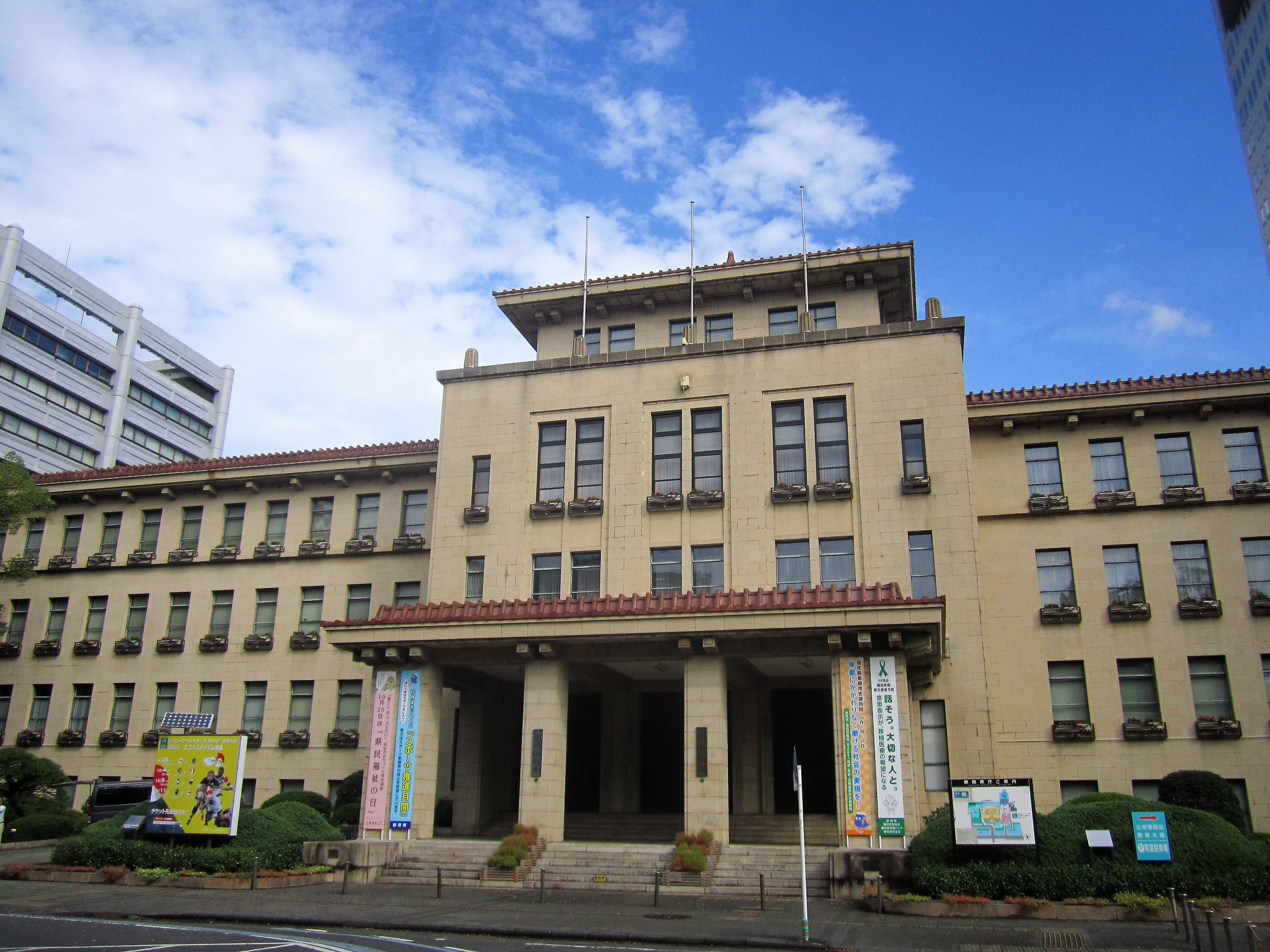
Shizuoka Prefectural Government Office

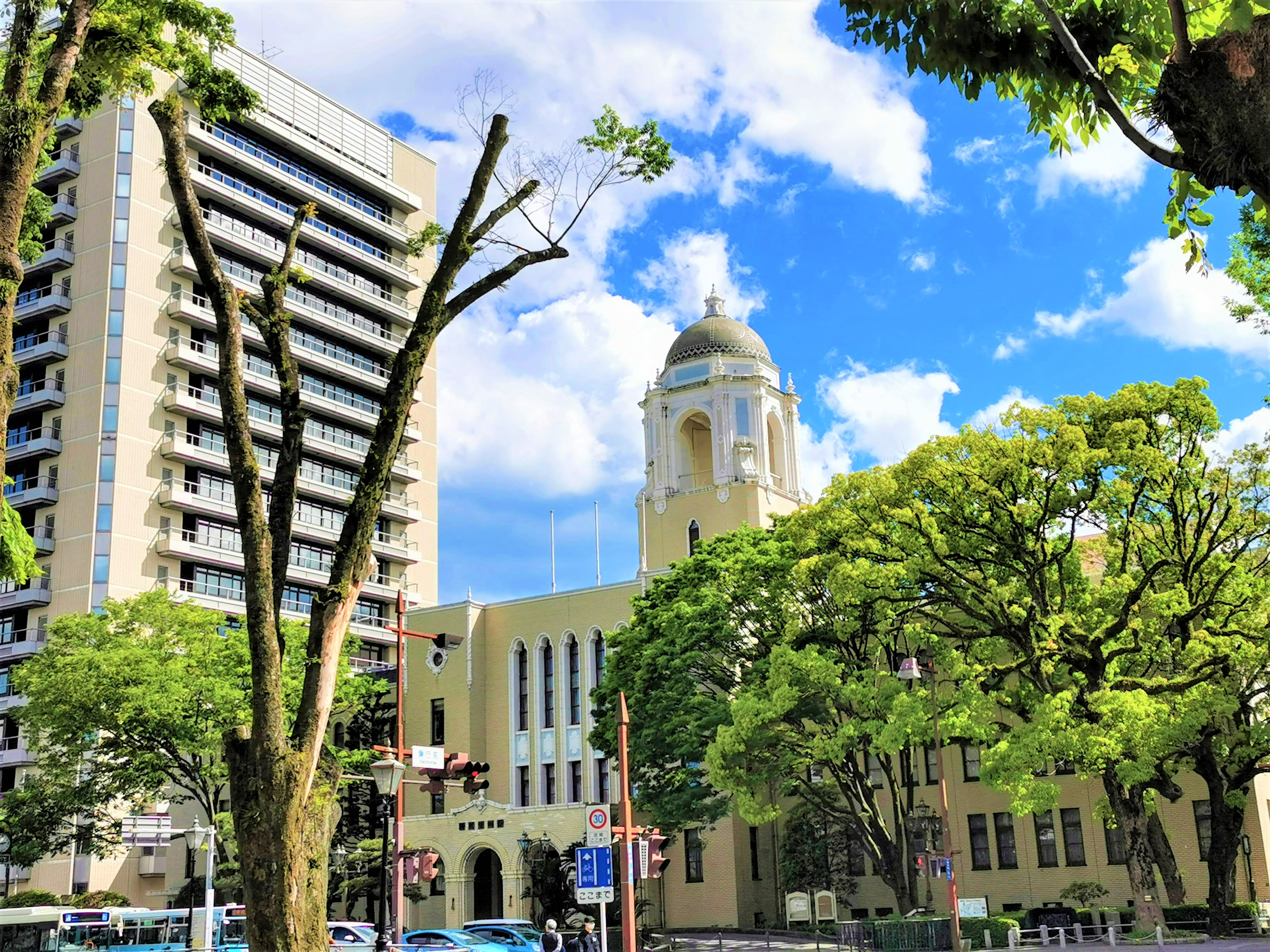
Shizuoka City Hall

Shizuoka has a mayor-council form of government with a directly elected mayor and a unicameral city legislature of 48 members. The city contributes 13 members to the Shizuoka Prefectural Assembly. In terms of national politics, the city is divided between Shizuoka 1st district and Shizuoka 4th district in the lower house of the Japanese Diet.

=== Mayors ===
==== Former Shizuoka city from 1889 to 2003 ====
Mayors of Shizuoka (from 1889 to 2003)
Term	Name	Start	Finish
1	Tetsutaro Hoshino (星野鉄太郎)	13 May 1889	17 April 1902
2	Hiroyasu Nagashima (長嶋弘裕)	14 May 1902	13 May 1914
3	Keisuke Komori (小森慶助)	28 May 1914	27 May 1918
4	Kinpei Banno (伴野欣平)	18 June 1918	2 July 1926
5	Genzaburo Kojima (小島源三郎)	8 September 1926	7 September 1929
6	Michinosuke Miyazaki (宮崎通之助)	3 March 1931	25 January 1933

Mayors of Shizuoka (from 1889 to 2003)
Term	Name	Start	Finish
7	Sadahito Suga (菅貞仁)	14 March 1933	12 August 1935
8	Motojiro Ozaki (尾崎元次郎)	12 October 1935	30 June 1938
9	Seiji Inamori (稲森誠次)	29 August 1938	5 August 1942
10	Motojiro Ozaki (second term)	7 October 1942	21 August 1944
11	Michinosuke Miyazaki (second term)	11 September 1944	11 November 1946
12	Shigeru Masuda (増田茂)	5 April 1947	9 April 1955

Mayors of Shizuoka (from 1889 to 2003)
Term	Name	Start	Finish
13	Jyunsaku Yamada (山田順策)	2 May 1955	1 May 1959
14	Hikoo Matsunaga (松永彦雄)	2 May 1959	1 May 1963
15	Jyunpei Ogino (荻野準平)	2 May 1963	1 May 1983
16	Daigo Kawai (河合代悟)	2 May 1983	1 May 1987
17	Shingo Amano (天野進吾)	2 May 1987	31 July 1994
18	Zenkichi Kojima (小嶋善吉)	28 August 1994	31 March 2003

==== Former Shimizu city from 1924 to 2003 ====
Mayors of Shimizu (from 1924 to 2003)
Term	Name	Start	Finish
1	Yozo Oshima (大島要蔵)	7 July 1924	9 September 1925
2	Katsushiro Yamada (山田勝四郎)	13 January 1926	8 March 1929
3	Tokisaburo Shiobara (塩原時三郎)	12 October 1929	22 February 1932
4	Enao Oishi (大石恵直)	18 March 1932	14 June 1937
5	Katsushiro Yamada (second term)	11 July 1937	15 November 1946
6	Masaharu Yamamoto (山本正治)	6 April 1947	7 April 1955
7	Heiichiro Suzuki (鈴木平一郎)	30 April 1955	30 April 1959
8	Toru Ina (稲名徹)	1 May 1959	22 July 1960
9	Kamezo Ina (稲名亀造)	15 September 1960	12 September 1964
10	Zensaku Ikegami (池上善作)	13 September 1964	6 July 1965
11	Torajiro Sato (佐藤虎次郎)	20 August 1965	19 August 1977
12	Yoshio Ina (稲名嘉男)	20 August 1977	19 August 1985
13	Hiromasa Miyagishima (宮城島弘正)	20 August 1985	31 March 2003

==== Since 2003 merger ====
Mayors of Shizuoka
Term	Name	Start	Finish
1–2	Zenkichi Kojima	14 April 2003	12 April 2011
3–6	Nobuhiro Tanabe	13 April 2011	12 April 2023
7	Takashi Namba	13 April 2023	current

=== Administration ===
==== Ward offices ====
- Shizuoka City Office/Aoi Ward Office:
  5-1 Ōtemachi, Aoi-ku, Shizuoka-shi 420-8602
  - Aoi Ward Ikawa Branch Office:
    656-2 Ikawa, Aoi-ku, Shizuoka-shi 428-0504
- Suruga Ward Office:
  10-40 Minamiyahata-chō, Suruga-ku, Shizuoka-shi 422-8550
  - Suruga Ward Osada Branch Office:
    13-1 Kami-Kawahara Suruga-ku, Shizuoka-shi 421-0132
- Shimizu City Office/Shimizu Ward Office:
  6-9 Asahi-chō, Shimizu-ku, Shizuoka-shi 424-8701
  - Shimizu Ward Kanbara Branch Office:
    1-21-1 Kanbara Shinden, Shimizu-ku, Shizuoka-shi 421-3211

== Sister cities ==
Shizuoka has twin and friendship relationships with several cities.

=== International ===
Sister cities

City	Country	State	since
Stockton	United States	California	October 16, 1959
Omaha	United States	Nebraska	April 1, 1965
Shelbyville	United States	Indiana	November 3, 1989
Cannes	France	Provence-Alpes-Côte d'Azur	November 5, 1991

Friendship cities

City	Country	State	since
Huế	Vietnam	Thừa Thiên Huế province	April 12, 2005

=== National ===
Sister cities

!City	Prefecture	region	since
Muroran	Iburi	Hokkaidō region	December 24, 1976
Jōetsu	Niigata	Chūbu region	October 12, 1995

Friendship cities

City	Prefecture	region	since
Saku	Nagano	Chūbu region	October 12, 1989

== Economy ==
A map showing Shizuoka Metropolitan Employment Area

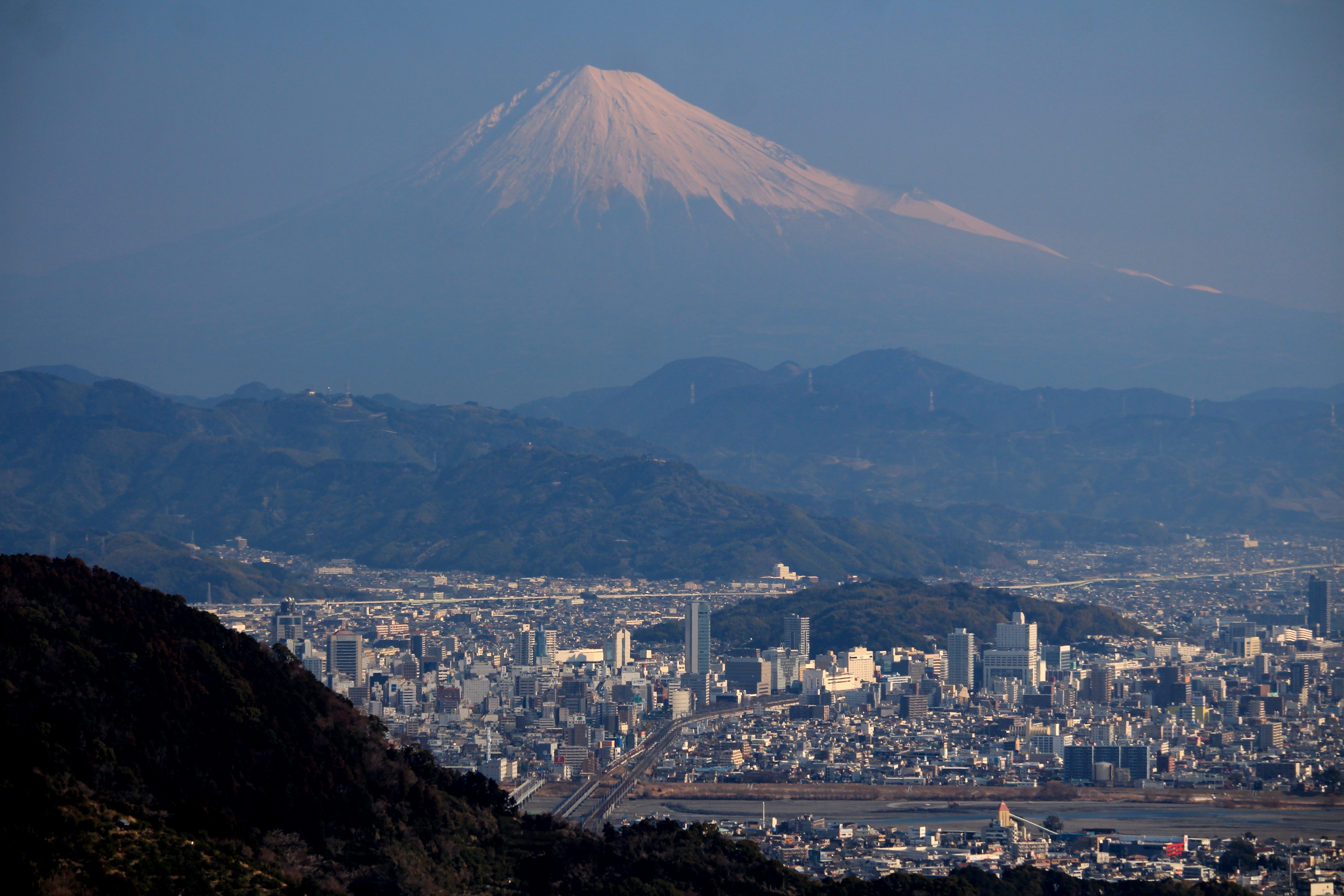
Mount Fuji and Shizuoka City

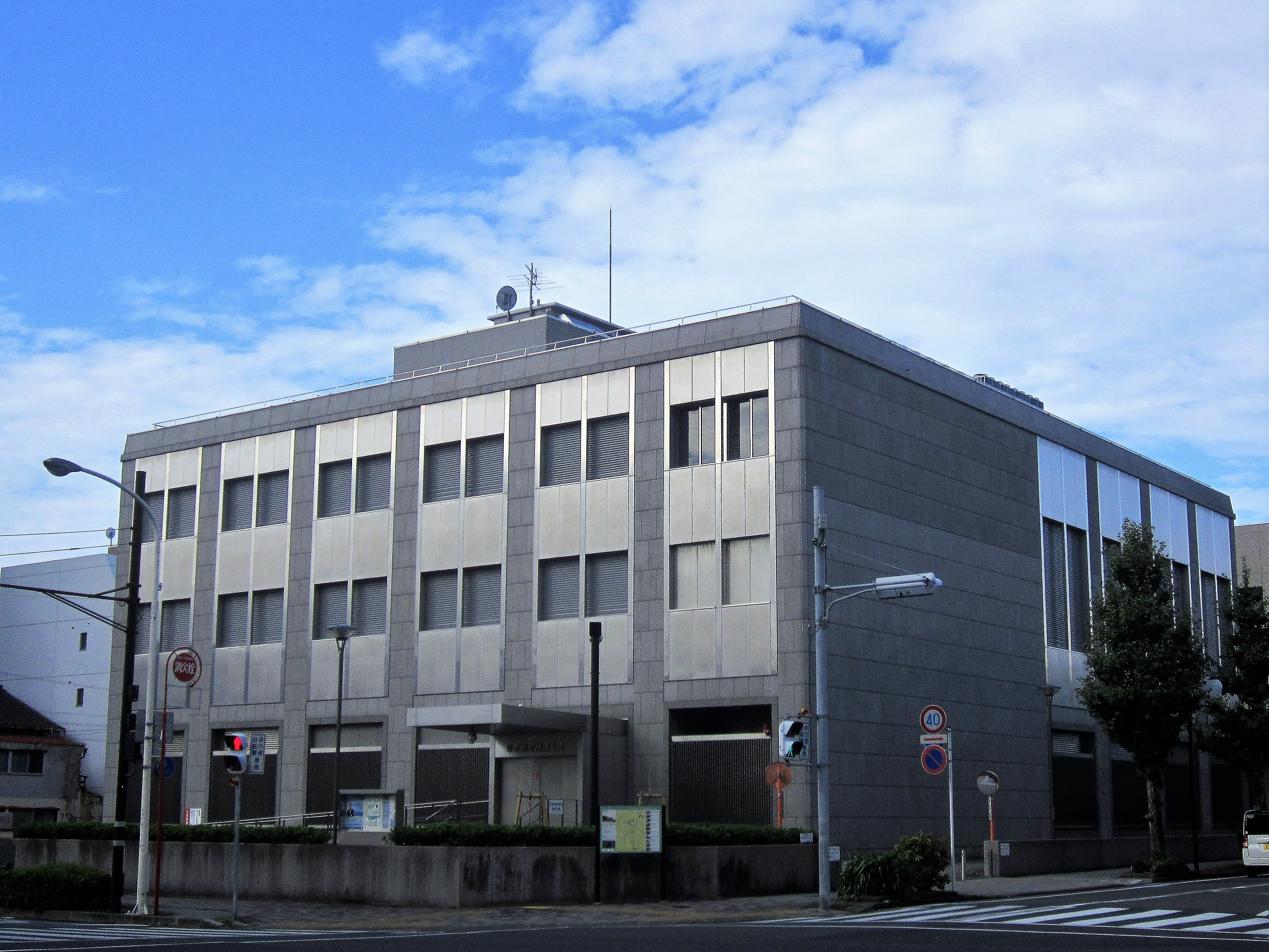
Bank of Japan Shizuoka Branch

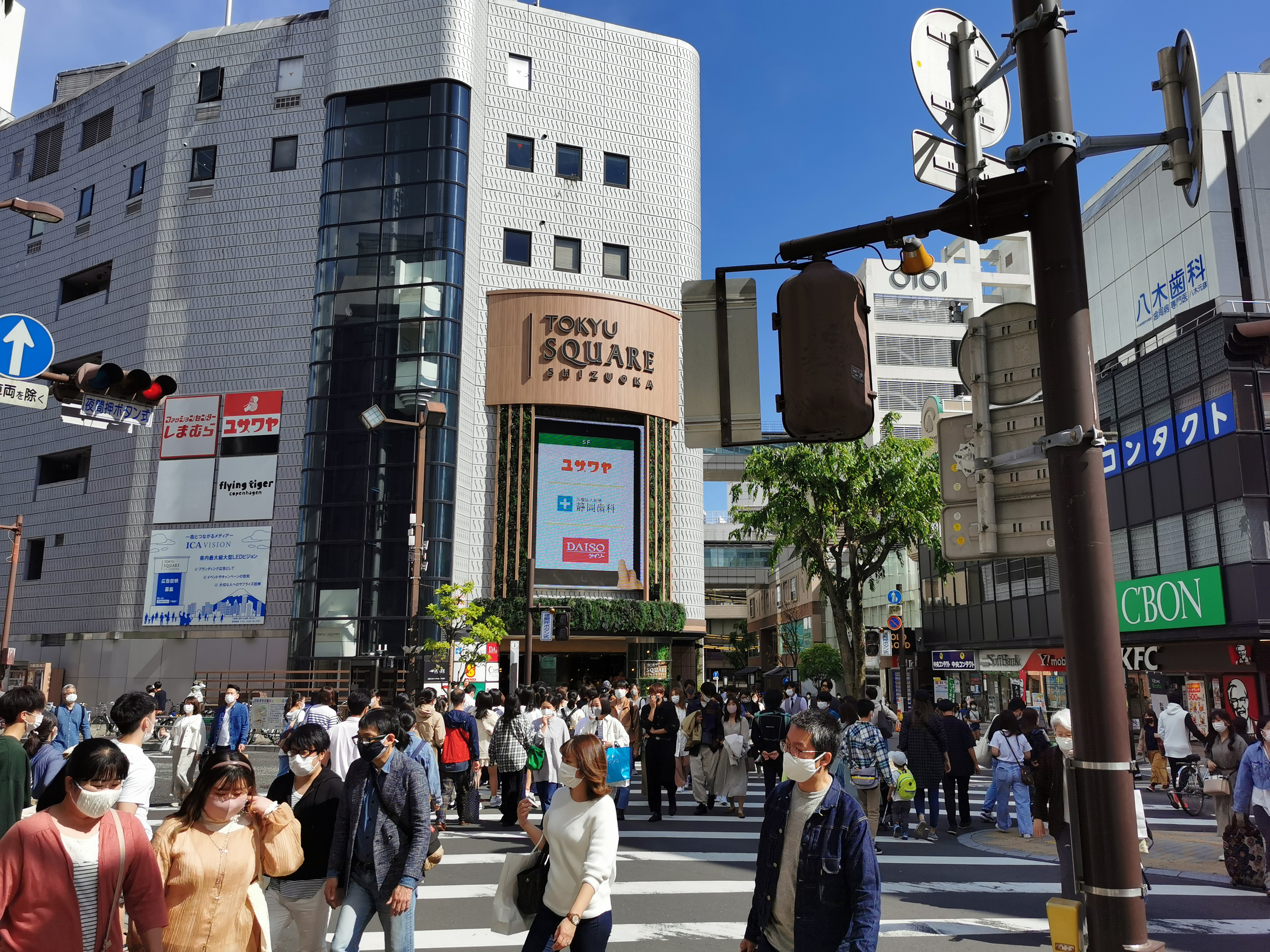
Downtown Shizuoka City

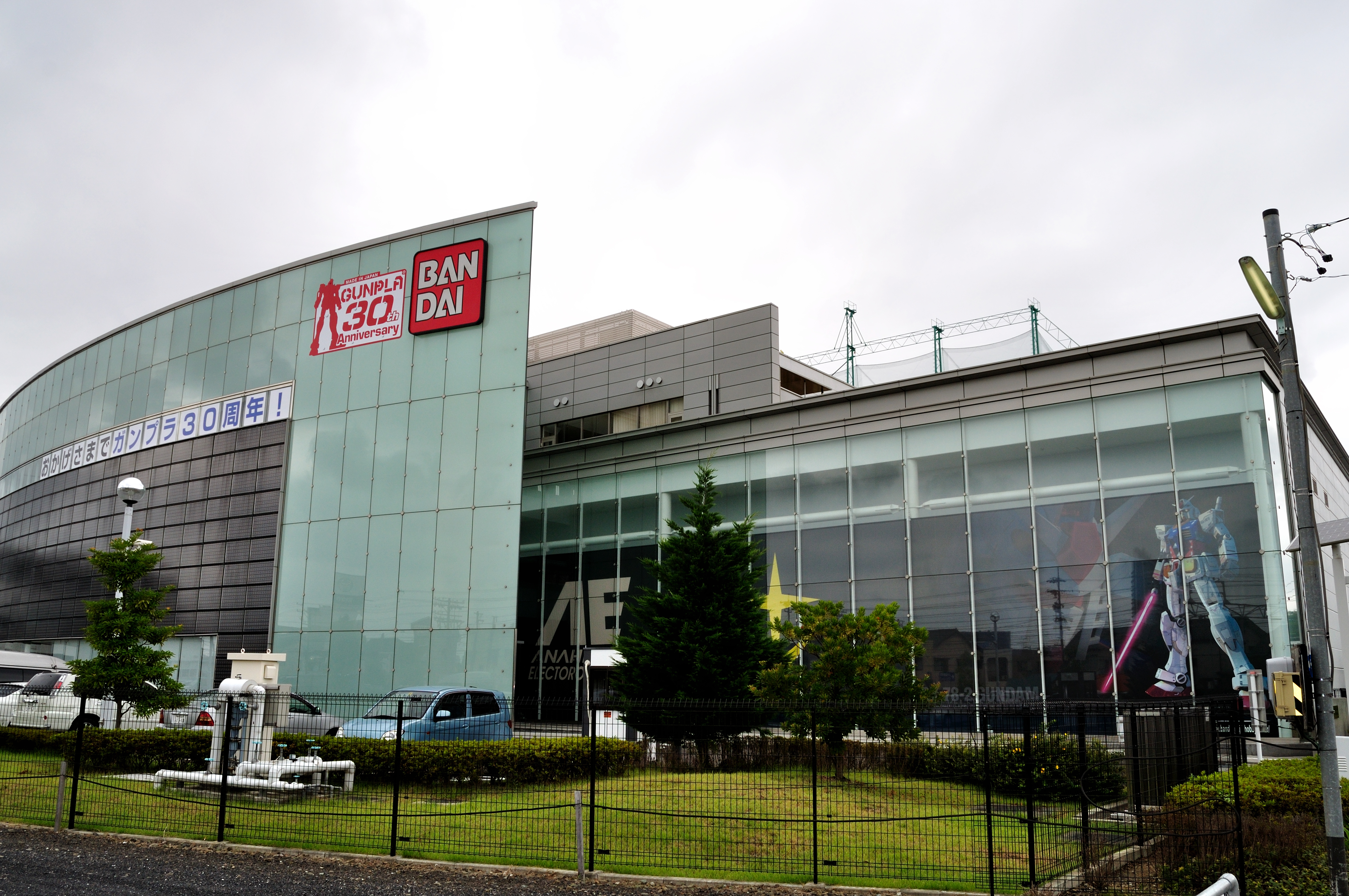
Bandai Hobby Center

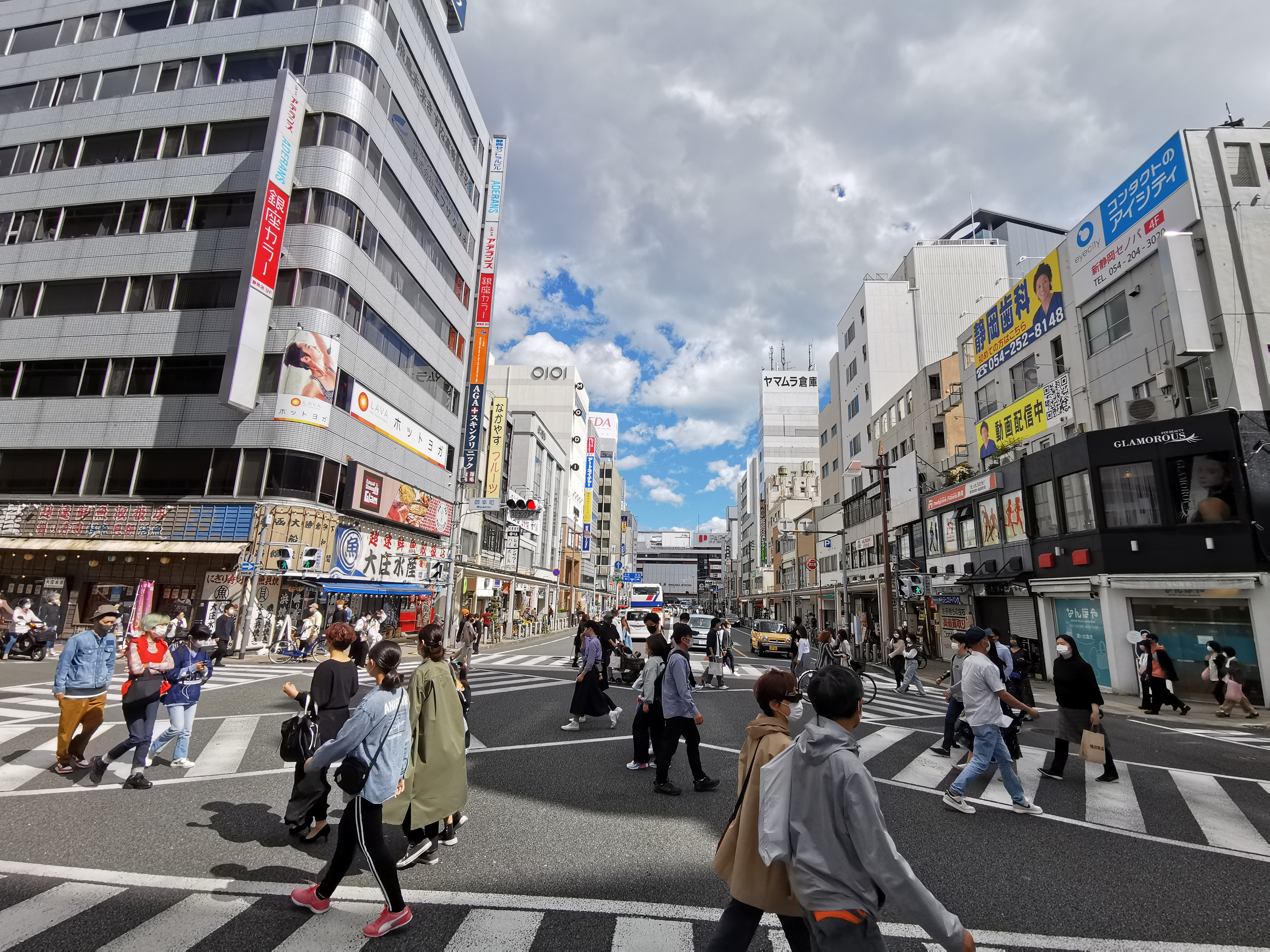
Miyukicho

Shizuoka has 35,579 businesses as of 2012.

Employment by industry: Agriculture 0.1%, Manufacturing: 26.9%, Service 73.0%

Greater Shizuoka, Shizuoka Metropolitan Employment Area, has a GDP of US$45.8 billion as of 2010.

Shizuoka's GDP per capita (PPP) 2014 was US$41,472.

Fuji Dream Airlines is headquartered in Aoi-ku, Shizuoka.

=== Agriculture ===
Green tea
Varieties such as Motoyama and Yabukita are grown in all corners of the city, and the varieties grown especially in the Warashina area in Aoi Ward and the Ryōgōchi area of Shimizu Ward are known for their high quality
Strawberries
"Stonewall strawberries" (石垣いちご, ishigaki ichigo) are strawberries that grow in holes on inclined stone walls, grown especially along an 8 km (5 mi) stretch of Kunō Kaidō (route 150), also known as "Strawberry Road", along the coast of Suruga Bay.
Wasabi
especially in areas such as Utōgi in Aoi Ward
Mandarin orange and other citrus fruits
especially Satsuma, a seedless and easy-peeling citrus mutant, known as mikan (みかん) or formally unshū mikan (ウンシュウミカン)
Lotus roots
especially in the Asahata area of Aoi Ward
Roses
especially in the Ihara and Okitsu areas in Shimizu Ward
Peaches
especially in the Osada area:::
Potatoes
Especially the Sebago potato. Originally exported to Crookwell

=== Fishery ===
Shimizu Port boasts the largest haul of tuna in all Japan. Kanbara Harbour enjoys a prosperous haul of sakura ebi, and Mochimune Harbour enjoys a prosperous haul of shirasu sardines.

=== Products ===
Abekawa Mochi is a type of rice cake (or mochi) made with kinako soy flour that is a specialty of Shizuoka.

Shizuoka has a long history of being involved in the craft industries going back over 400 years ago, using trees, including hinoki cypress. The model industry goes back to the late 1920s when wood was used to produce model toys, using sashimono woodworking joinery techniques, purely for educational purposes. Craftsmen later moved on to lighter woods including balsa, but following the war, with the importation of US built scale models, many companies either turned to plastic models to compete or went under.

The town has since become internationally notable for its plastic scale model kits and is resident to long-established companies such as Aoshima, Fujimi, Hasegawa, and Tamiya. Another model brand, Bandai, produces its Gundam models exclusively at its Bandai Hobby Center plant in the city. The city hosts the long-running Shizuoka Hobby Show annually in May at Twin Messe Shizuoka.

== Media ==
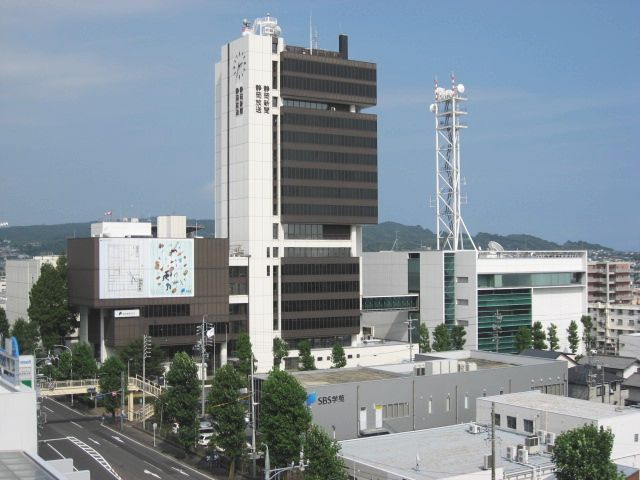
The headquarters of Shizuoka Broadcasting System (SBS) and the Shizuoka Shimbun newspaper

=== Print media ===
The Shizuoka Shimbun is the area's primary newspaper.

The book trilogy “Paper Gods” by Amanda Sun takes place in this city.

=== Broadcast media ===
==== Television ====
- NHK Shizuoka (Analogue Channel 9; Digital Channel 1)
- NHK Shizuoka Educational Channel (Analogue Channel 2; Digital Channel 2)
- Shizuoka Broadcasting System (SBS) (Analogue Channel 11; Digital Channel 6)
- TV Shizuoka (Analogue Channel 35; Digital Channel 8)
- Shizuoka Daiichi Television (Analogue Channel 31; Digital Channel 4)
- Shizuoka Asahi Television (Analogue Channel 33; Digital Channel 5)

==== Cable television ====
Shizuoka Cable Television (Dream Wave Shizuoka)

==== Radio ====
- NHK1 882 kHz
- NHK2 639 kHz
- NHK-FM 88.8 MHz
- SBS 1404 kHz / 93.9 MHz
- K-MIX 79.2 MHz
- FM-Hi！76.9 MHz
- Marine Pal (FM Shimizu) 76.3 MHz
- Guzen Media Japan—A podcast and vidcast based in Shizuoka, Japan

== Education ==
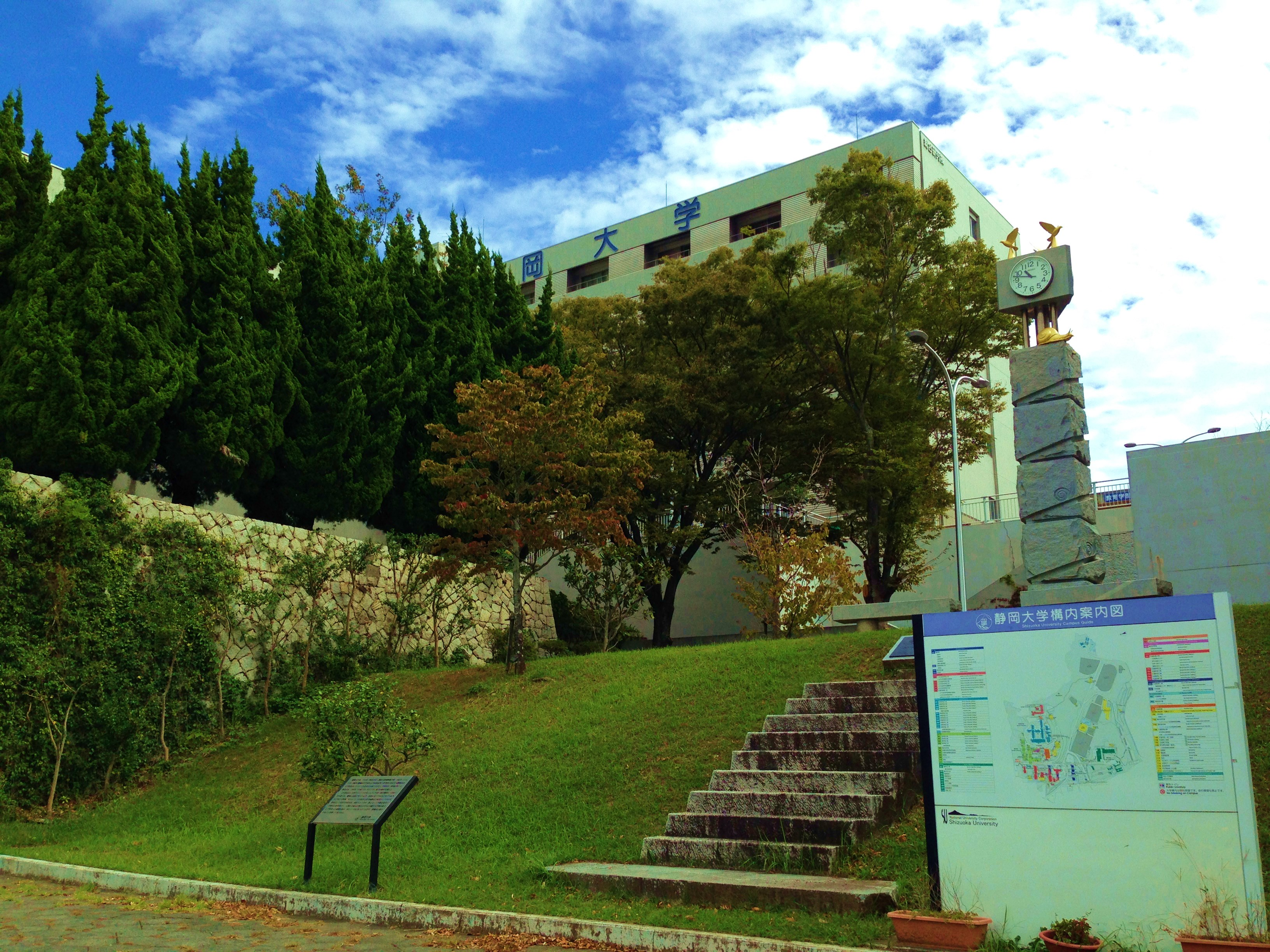
The main campus of Shizuoka University

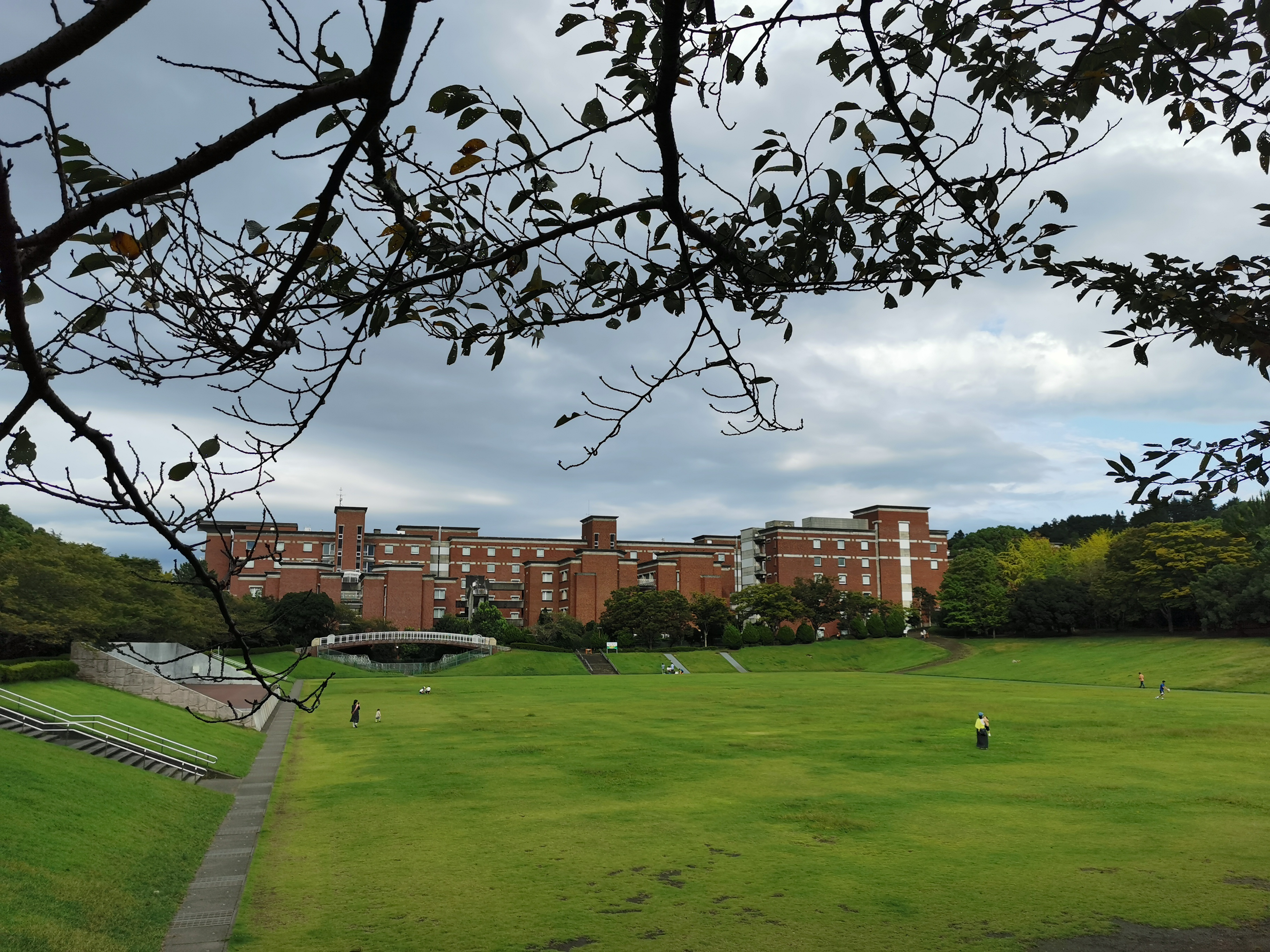
Shizuoka Prefectural University

=== Colleges and universities ===
- Shizuoka University

National university, founded 1949. Main campus in Suruga Ward. Abbreviated to 静大 (Shizudai).

- University of Shizuoka (Shizuoka Prefectural University)

Public university whose main campus is in Suruga Ward, close to Kusanagi Station.

- Tokai University

Shimizu campus of the Tokyo-based private university

- Tokoha Gakuen University

Private university founded in 1946

- Shizuoka Eiwa Gakuin University

Co-educational private university in Suruga Ward, founded by missionaries from the Methodist Church of Canada with the support of the Shizuoka prefectural government. First institution in Shizuoka Prefecture to offer secondary education for girls, it became a four-year coeducational university in 2002.

- University of Shizuoka Junior College

Junior college in Suruga Ward, affiliated with University of Shizuoka.

- Tokai University Junior College

Junior college in Aoi Ward, affiliated with Tokai University.

- Tokoha Gakuen Junior College

Junior college in Aoi Ward, affiliated with Tokoha Gakuen University.

=== Primary and secondary education ===
Shizuoka has 91 elementary schools, 57 middle schools and 27 high schools. In addition there are 29 vocations schools and 12 public libraries.

== Transportation ==
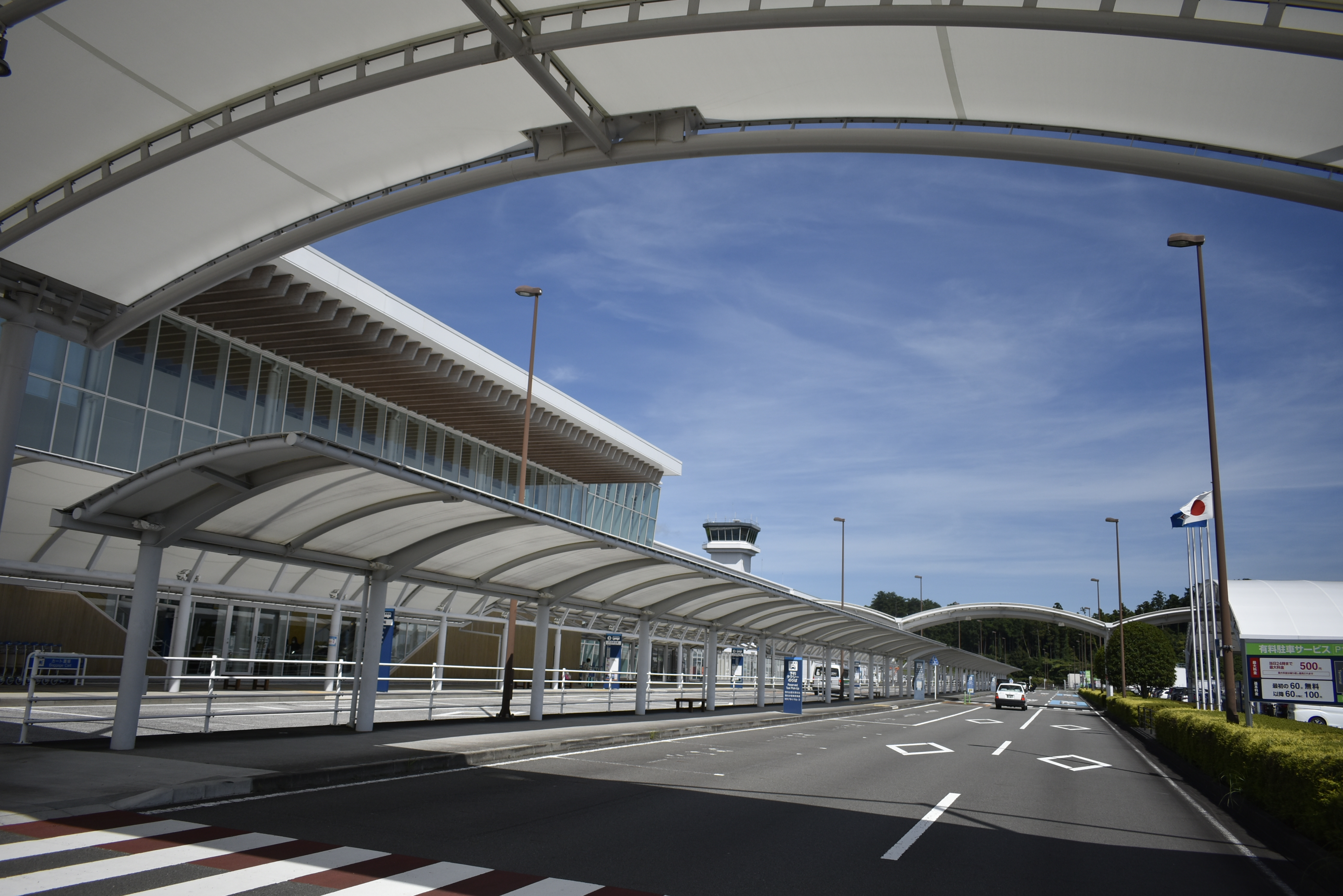
Shizuoka Airport

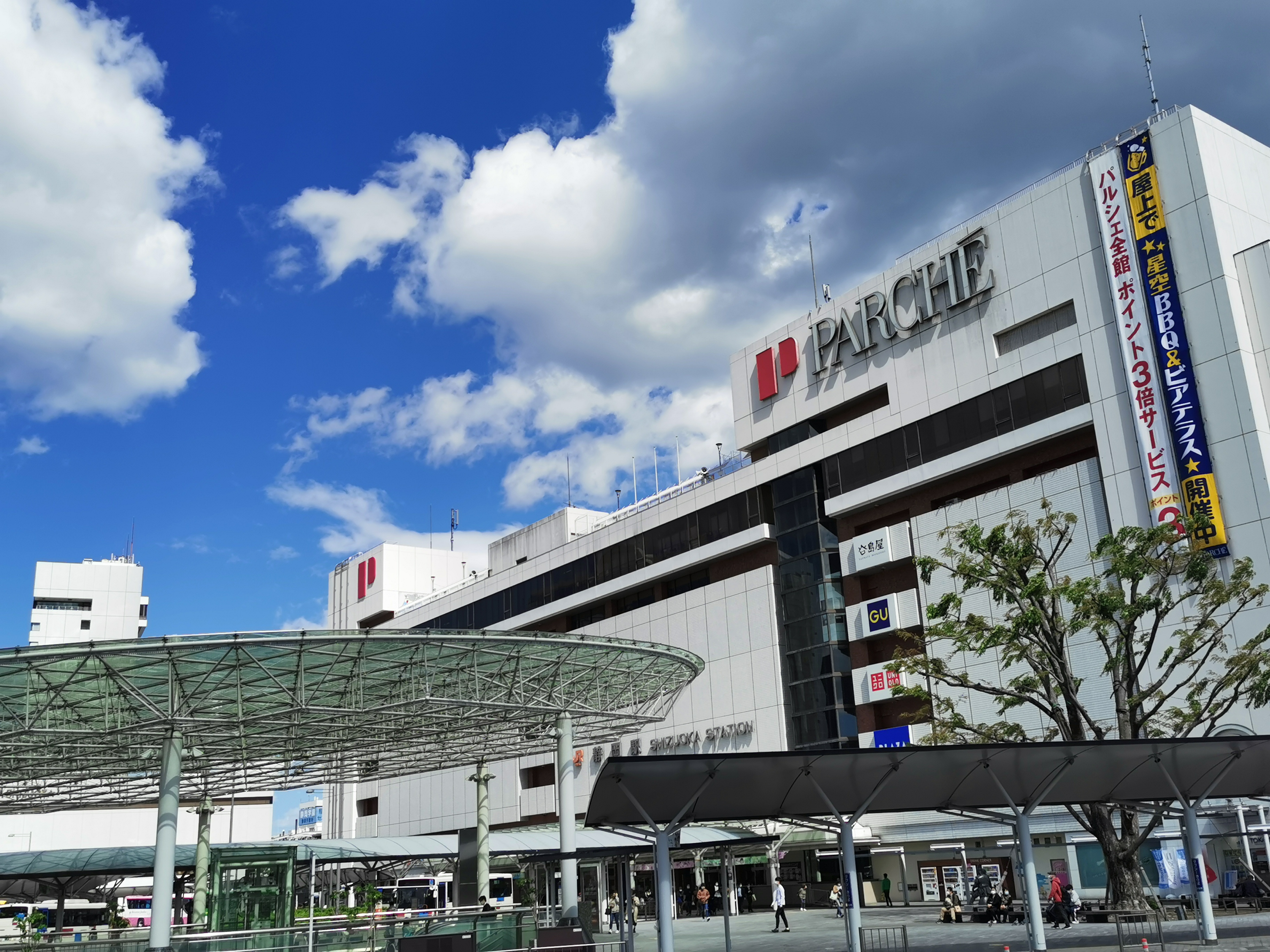
Shizuoka Station North exit

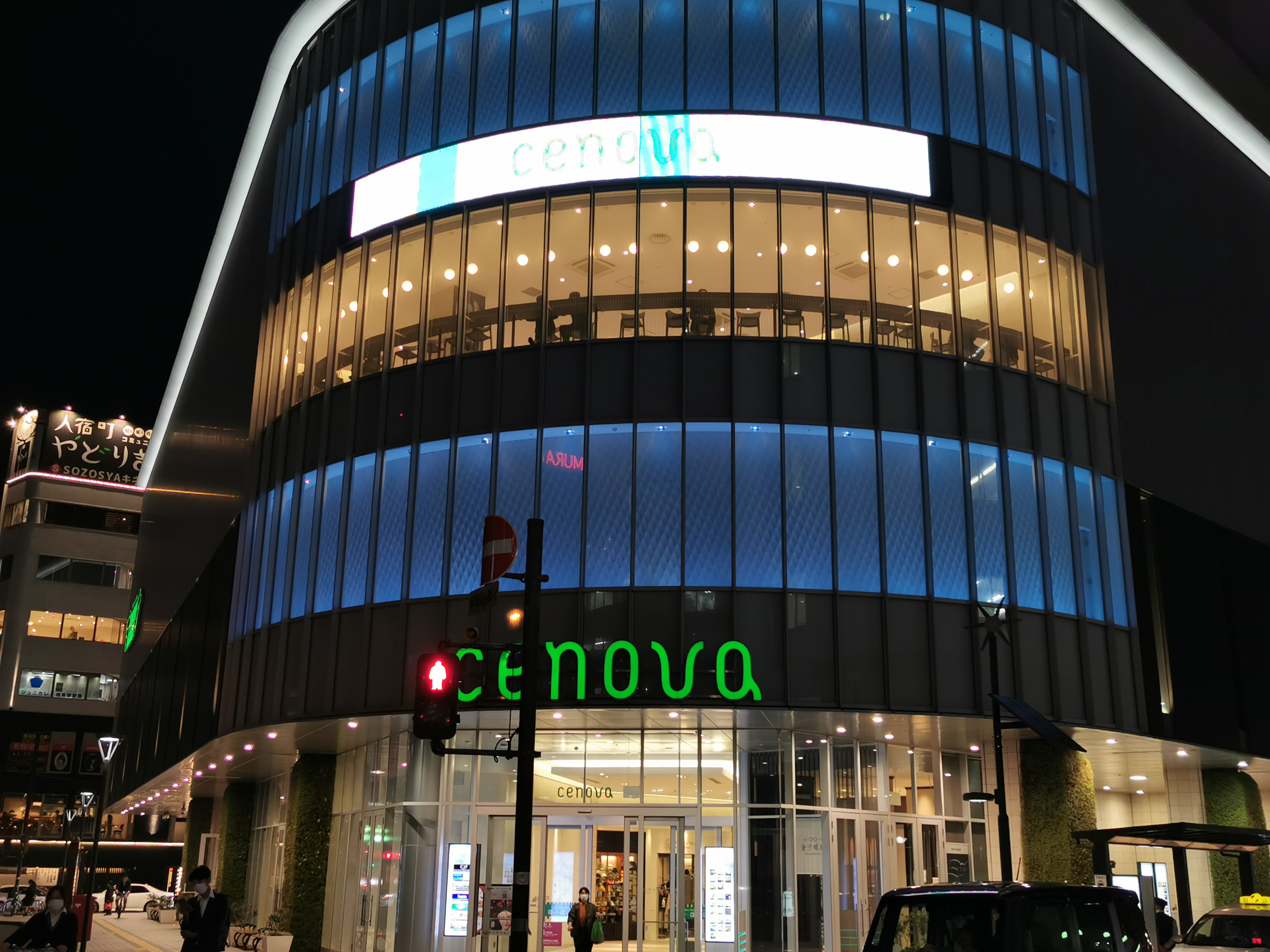
Shin-Shizuoka Cenova

=== Airways ===
==== Airports ====
The nearest airport is Shizuoka Airport, situated between Makinohara and Shimada.

=== Railways ===
Shizuoka lies on the Tōkaidō Main Line, the JR Central main railway line from Tokyo to Osaka, and is well-served by the Tōkaidō Shinkansen, limited express and regional trains. The central station of Shizuoka is in the city centre. Shizuoka also has an LRT line, the Shizuoka Railway, administered by the Shizuoka Railway Co., Ltd. at Shizuoka Station. The under construction Chūō Shinkansen will pass through the mountainous area in the northern tip of the city. However, the line is not planned to have a station in Shizuoka.

==== High-Speed Rail ====
Central Japan Railway Company (JR Tōkai)

- Tōkaidō Shinkansen: - Shizuoka -

==== Conventional lines ====
Central Japan Railway Company (JR Tōkai)

- Tōkaidō Main Line: - Shin-Kambara • Kambara • Yui • Okitsu • Shimizu • Kusanagi • Higashi-Shizuoka • Shizuoka • Abekawa • Mochimune • -

Shizuoka Railway (Shizutetsu)

- Shizuoka Railway Shizuoka-Shimizu Line: Shin-Shizuoka – Hiyoshichō – Otowachō – Kasugachō – Yunoki – Naganuma – Furushō – Ken-Sōgō Undōjō – Kenritsu Bijutsukanmae – Kusanagi – Mikadodai – Kitsunegasaki – Sakurabashi – Irieoka – Shin-Shimizu

Ōigawa Railway (Daitetsu)

- Ōigawa Railway Ikawa Line: - Kanzō – Ikawa -

=== Buses ===
==== Bus terminal ====
- Shin-Shizuoka Cenova

=== Roads ===
==== Expressway ====
- Tōmei Expressway
- Shin-Tōmei Expressway
- Chūbu-Ōdan Expressway

==== Japan National Route ====
- National Route 1
- National Route 52
- National Route 149
- National Route 150
- National Route 362

=== Seaways ===
==== Sea port ====
The Port of Shimizu-ku, in Shimizu City (now Shimizu Ward), is a long established mid-size sea port, catering to container ships, dry bulk ships and cruise ships.

It is well located, being in between the two major port areas of Japan, i.e. the Tokyo Bay ports of Tokyo, Kawasaki and Yokohama (Keihin ports) and the Osaka Bay ports of Osaka and Kobe (Hanshin ports). The Port of Shimizu has a water depth of about 12 metres (39 ft); its attractiveness has been enhanced over the past years by the construction of new road and rail links which contribute to expanding its commercial hinterland.

In tonnage, imports (about 6.5 million tonnes (6,400,000 long tons; 7,200,000 short tons)) are close to twice export volumes, but in trade value exports are twice as valuable as imports.

The Port of Shimizu container traffic is about balanced, with over 250,000 TEU in each direction, with auto parts and chemicals amongst the main cargo types. Major international container lines provide weekly services on major trade routes, including North America, Europe and Asia, with about 110 calls per months on 28 trade routes.

The port of Shimizu also includes a terminal to receive LNG tankers and store imported Liquefied natural gas; it is operated by Shimizu LNG, a subsidiary of Shizuoka Gas (Japan is the world's largest importer of LNG).

The Port of Shimizu is also connected to other Japan ports. In particular, it is served by a Roll-on/roll-off service serving the port of Ōita, on the north-east coast of the southern island of Kyushu. This service, which sails three times a week and has a transit time of 20 hours, has enabled a modal shift of freight trucks from road to sea, thereby contributing to decreasing congestion and pollution on roads.

== Tourism ==
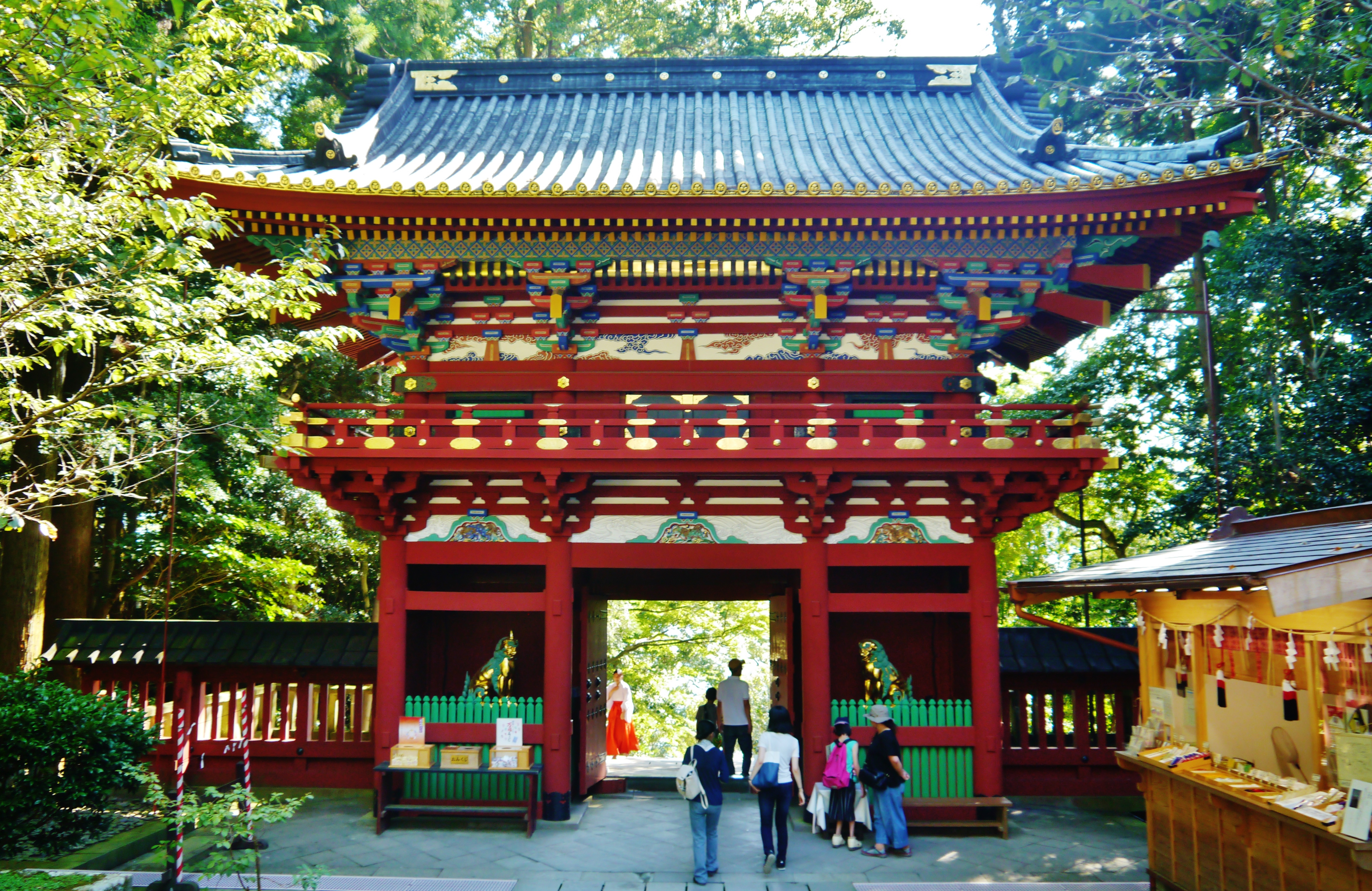
Kunōzan Tōshō-gū

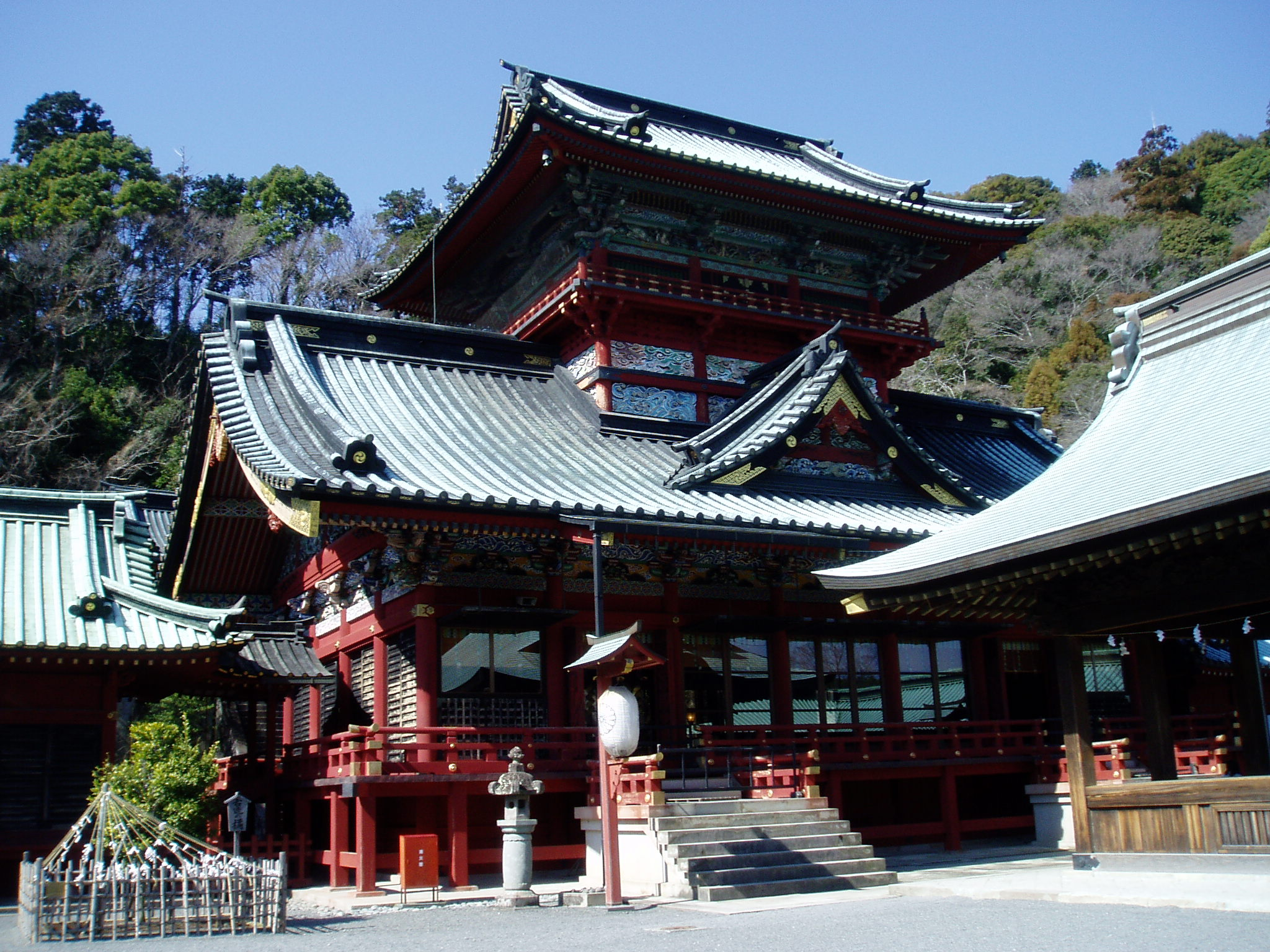
Shizuoka Sengen Shrine

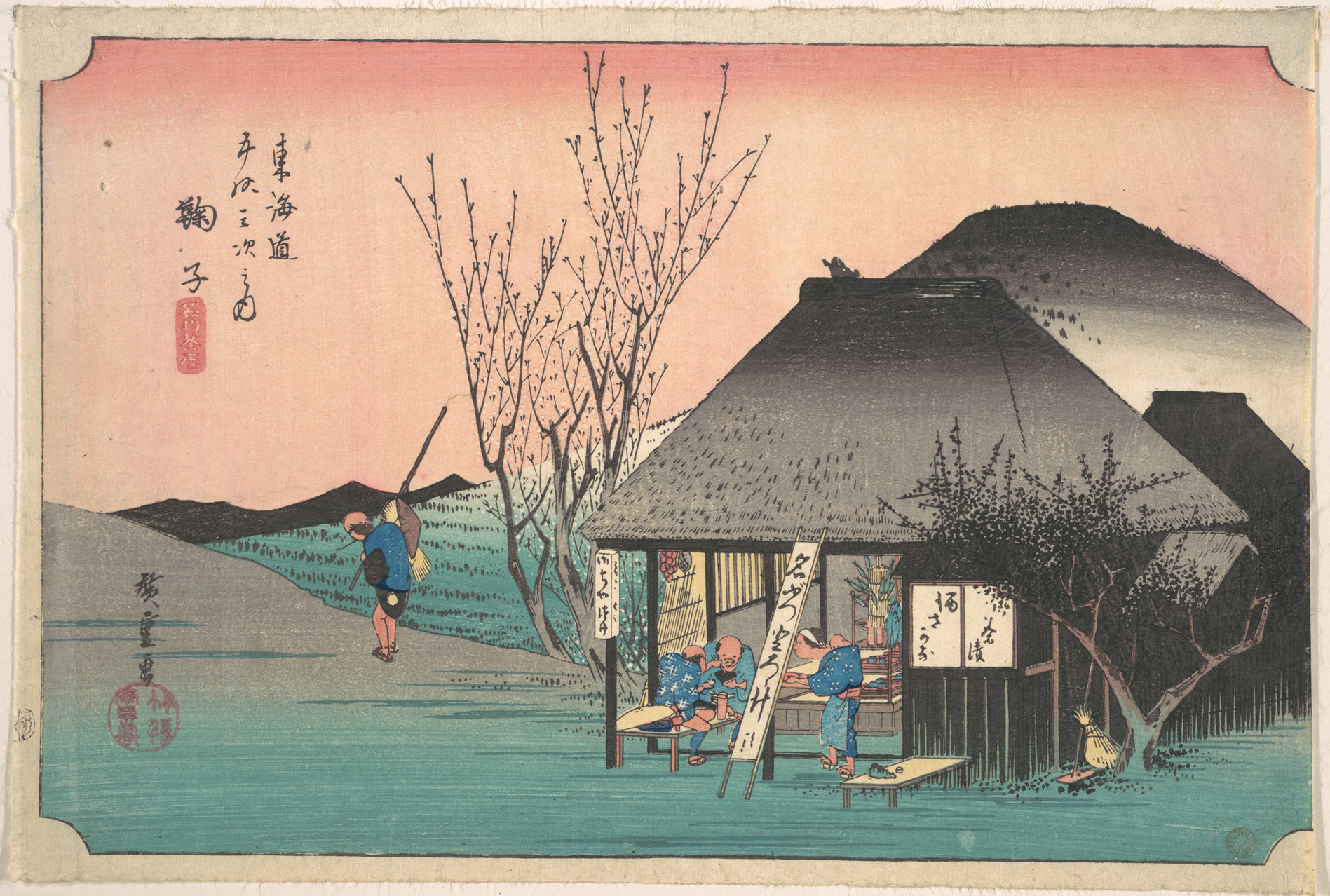
Hiroshige's Mariko-juku

=== Local attractions ===
==== Museums ====
- Shizuoka Prefectural Museum of Art
- Shizuoka City Tokaido Hiroshige Museum of Art
- Museum of Natural and Environmental History, Shizuoka

=== Major attractions ===
- Nihondaira
- Miho no Matsubara

=== Historic spots ===
==== In Aoi Ward ====
Shizuoka Sengen Shrine
A collection of Shinto shrines that was patronised by powerful warrior clans since ancient times, most notably the Tokugawa clan.
Sunpu Park/Sunpu Castle ruins
The castle of the Imagawa and Tokugawa clans, originally built in 1599, was destroyed in 1869. Today, only the moats remain. The rest was turned into a park, and is now a popular place for hanami.

==== In Suruga Ward ====
Toro
Late Yayoi archaeological site notable as the first archaeological site excavated in Japan in which remains of a 1st-century AD Yayoi-era wet-rice Paddy fields were found.
Kunōzan Tōshō-gū
Shinto shrine that was the original burial place of Shōgun Tokugawa Ieyasu, and the oldest of the Tōshō-gū shrines in Japan. The main festival of the shrine is held annually on 17 April, although its spring festival from 17–18 February is a larger event.
Mariko-juku
Twentieth of the fifty-three stations of the old Tōkaidō road, an old travel route during the Edo period.

==== In Shimizu Ward ====
Miho Peninsula
Famous for the scenic Miho no Matsubara (三保の松原, Miho Pine Grove), renowned as a seashore with beautiful green pine trees and white sands spanning over seven kilometers, designated as one of New Three Views of Japan (新日本三景, Shin Nihon Sankei). Also known as the scene of the legend of Hagoromo, which is based on the traditional swan maiden motif.

== Culture ==
=== Festivals ===
Daidogei World Cup (大道芸ワールドカップ, Daigougei Waarudo kappu)
The Daidogei World Cup is an annual international street performers' festival, held over various locations around the city in November over four days. It was first held in 1992.

Shizuoka Festival (静岡まつり, Shizuoka Matsuri)
The festival, which begun in 1957 but whose origins date back to traditions hundreds of years old, takes place in April, during the high point of the year for cherry blossoms. A flower-viewing procession echoes the shōgun Tokugawa Ieyasu's custom of taking daimyōs (feudal lords) to Sengen Shrine to view the cherry blossoms in the 17th century.

Abekawa Fireworks (安倍川花火, Abekawa Hanabi)
A gigantic fireworks display held upstream on Shizuoka's Abekawa River in late July. It was first held 1953, to remember those who died during World War II and to pray for a national revival. Today, around 15,000 fireworks are .

=== Cuisine ===
Oden
a Japanese dish consisting of several ingredients such as boiled eggs, daikon radish, konnyaku, and processed fish cakes stewed in a light, soy-flavoured dashi broth. Oden in Shizuoka uses a dark coloured broth flavoured with beef stock and dark soy sauce. All ingredients are skewered. Dried, ground fish (sardine, mackerel, or katsuobushi) and aonori powder (edible seaweed) are sprinkled on top before eating.
Gyoza
Soba noodles
Seafood
Zōni soup
rice cakes in a broth cooked with vegetables, popular at New Year
Tororo-jiru
A grated yam soup. Chojiya, a tororo-jiru restaurant founded in 1598 in Mariko-juku area of Shizuoka, west of the Abe River, was made famous by Hiroshige when he depicted it in his series of ukiyo-e prints of the 53 stops along the Tōkaidō.

=== Shizuoka Performing Arts Center ===
The Shizuoka Performing Arts Center (SPAC) was founded in 1995 by the Shizuoka Prefecture. The building was designed by architect Arata Isozaki and was opened in 1999 for the second Theatre Olympics.

The arts center is the first publicly funded cultural organization in Japan to have its own troupe of actors and other staff to manage its own venues and facilities for artistic purposes. Tadashi Suzuki was the first Artistic Director, appointed in 1997 and staying in the position until March 2007, after which Miyagi Satoshi took up the appointment. SPAC has organised the World Theatre Festival Shizuoka each year since 2011, as well as creating its own theatre productions (some of which tour abroad), having students to learn at the center, and other theatrical activities.

The World Theatre Festival Shizuoka was formerly called the Shizuoka Spring Festival (2000-2010), being changed to "World Theater Festival Shizuoka under Mt. Fuji" in 2012 by the artistic director of the centre, Miyagi Satoshi. His intention was "to connect Shizuoka to the world through theater", to have performances from every corner of the world, for "people to see that the world isn't a set and finished quantity and there is still plenty of room for change. I wanted to communicate that theater is a window to the world". The festival includes stage plays, puppetry, film, dance and other performance arts.

In 2020, due to the COVID-19 pandemic, it was announced on 3 April that the festival, scheduled to begin from 25 April to 6 May, would be cancelled. Instead, Miyagi staged an online version of the festival.

=== Sport ===
With the Shimizu merger, Shimizu S-Pulse became the major football club in the city. Recently, however, a new rival club, Fujieda MYFC (from nearby Fujieda), has been rising in the regional league ranks as a contender for a place in the Japan Football League. The city hosted the official Asian Basketball Championship for Women in 1995 and 1999.

Club	Sport	League	Venue	Established
Chanson V-Magic	Basketball	W.League	Konohana Arena	1961
Seikō	Softball	Japan Softball League（JSL）	Kusanagi Stadium	1980
Shimizu S-Pulse	Football	J.League	IAI Stadium Nihondaira	1991
Veltex Shizuoka	Basketball	B.League	Shizuoka City Central Gymnasium	2018
Shizuoka Jade	Table tennis	T.League	Shizuoka City Central Gymnasium	2022
Kufu HAYATE Ventures Shizuoka	Baseball	NPB (Western League)	Shizuoka City Shimizu Ihara Stadium	2024

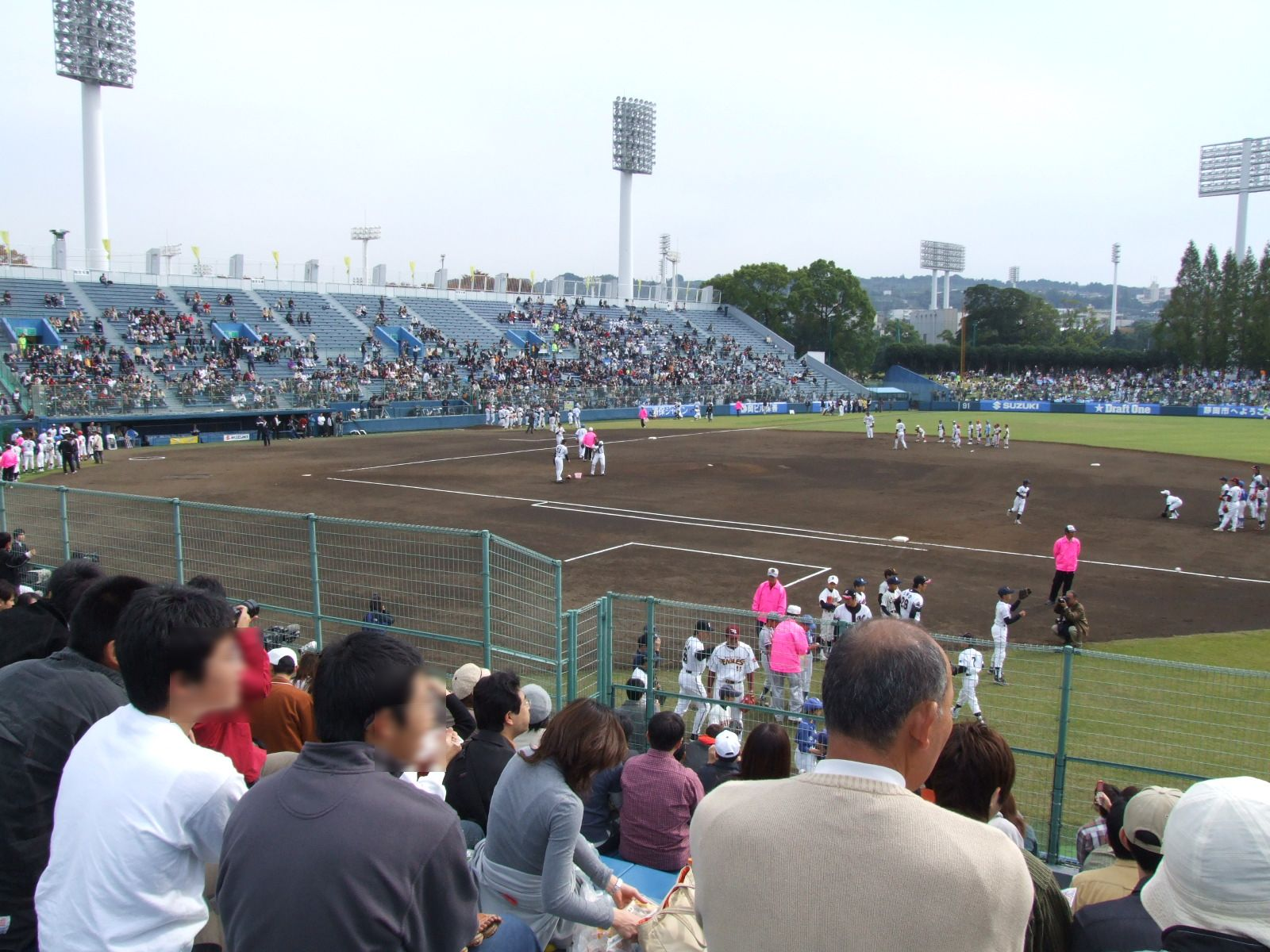
Kusanagi Stadium

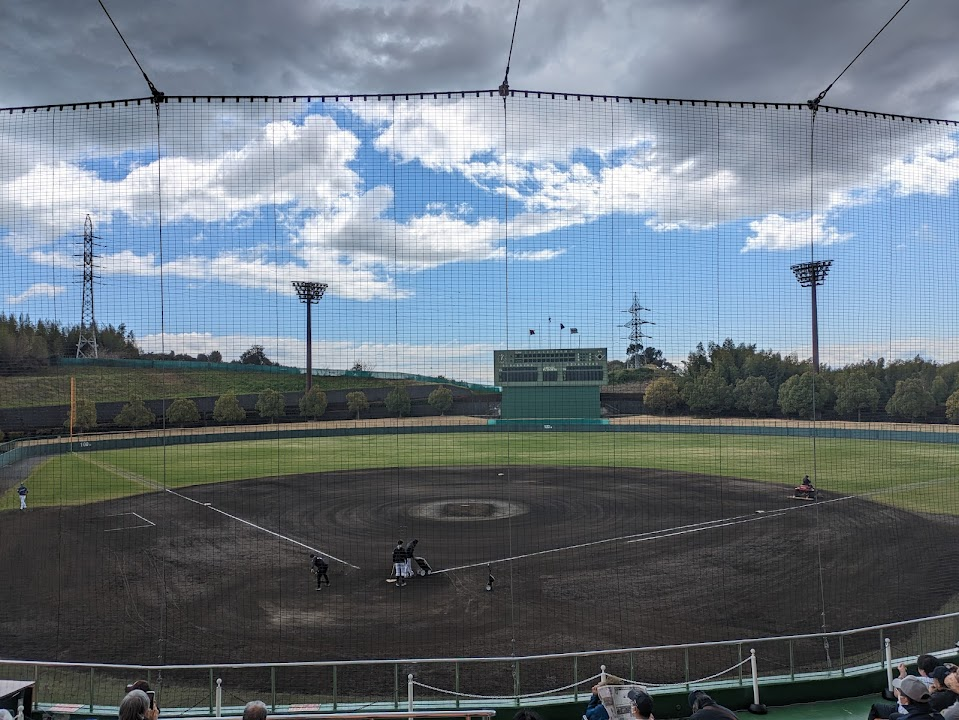
Shizuoka City Shimizu Ihara Stadium

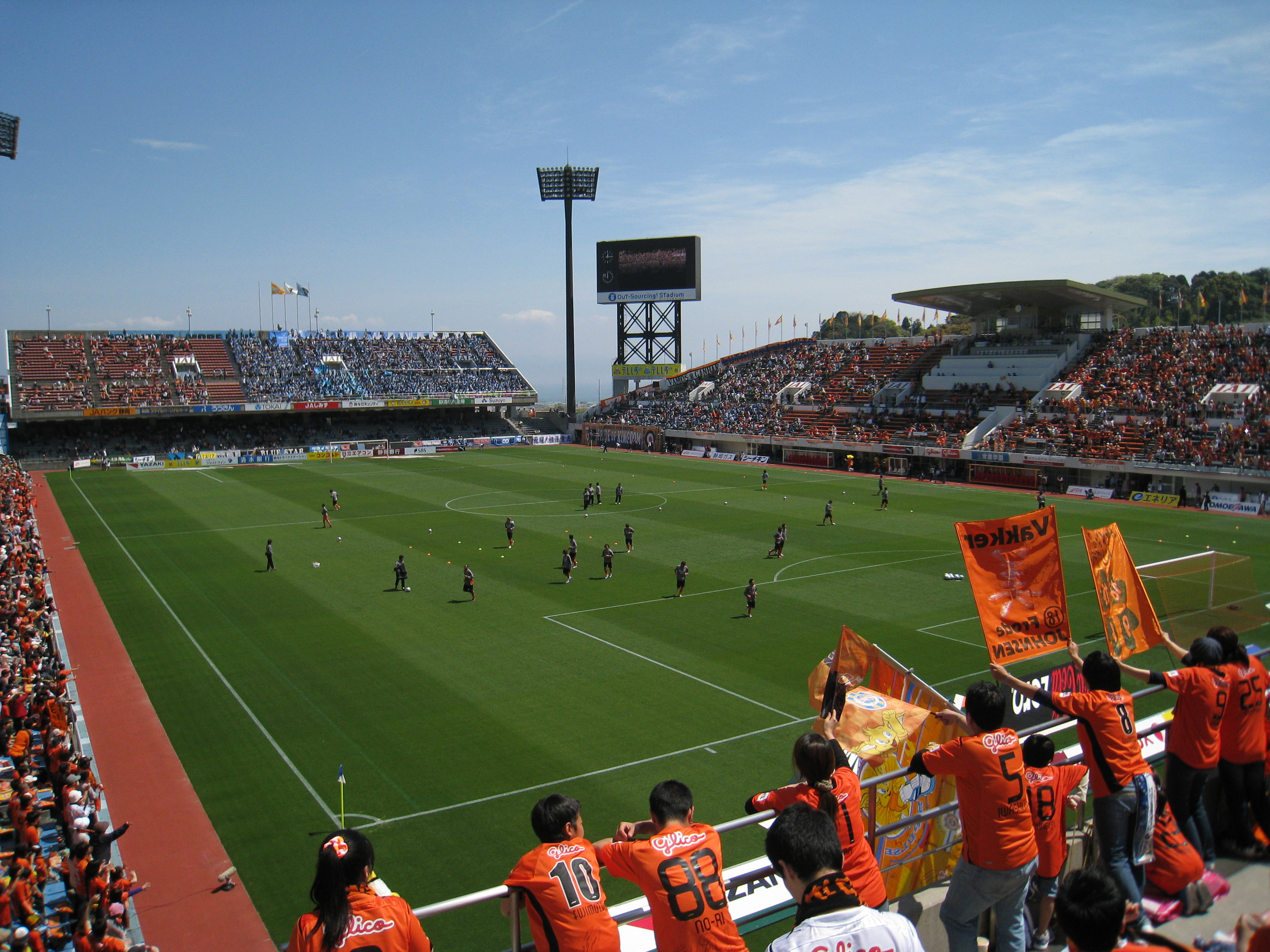
IAI Stadium Nihondaira

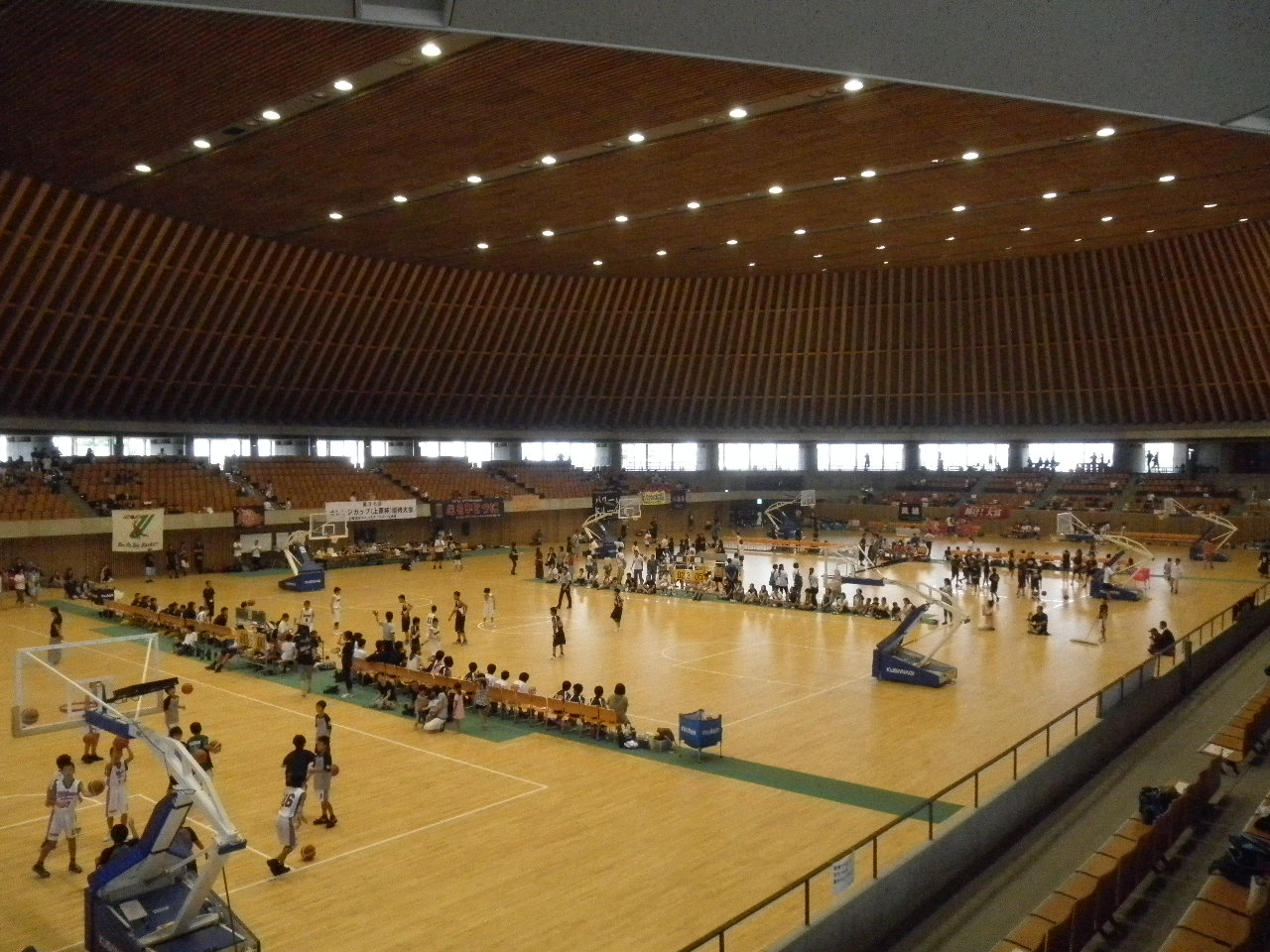
Konohana Arena

== Notable people ==
- Princess Akishino – princess in the Japanese Imperial Family
- Yoshitaka Amano – illustrator and animator, designed the characters for the early Final Fantasy video game series
- Shoji Endo (George Masa) - Japananese American baseball player and photographer
- Kenta Hasegawa – professional football manager and former player, currently managing Nagoya Grampus
- Kazuyoshi Hoshino – racecar driver
- Daisuke Ichikawa – professional football player
- Shohei Ikeda – professional football player
- Toru Irie – professional football player
- Teruyoshi Ito – professional football player
- Yahiro Kazama – professional football player
- Naoya Kikuchi – professional football player
- Hiroki Kobayashi – professional football player
- Tomoaki Kuno – professional football player
- Hidetaka Miyazaki – video game director, creator of the Dark Souls series
- Fumitake Miura – professional football player
- Kazuyoshi Miura – professional football player
- Yasutoshi Miura – professional football player
- Koki Mizuno – professional football player
- Hisashi Mizutori – Olympic gold medal gymnast
- Kazuyori Mochizuki – professional football player
- Shigeyoshi Mochizuki – professional football player
- Riyo Mori – Miss Universe 2007
- Yusuke Mori – professional football player
- Ushiomaru Motoyasu – sumo wrestler
- Jun Muramatsu – professional football player
- Fuma Murata - Member and sub-leader of J-pop group &Team
- Go Oiwa – professional football manager and former player, currently manager of Japan national under-23 football team
- Katsumi Oenoki – professional football player
- Takeshi Oki – professional football player
- Ryota Oshima – professional football player
- Keisuke Ota – professional football player
- Toshihide Saito – professional football player
- Momoko Sakura – cartoonist, creator of Chibi Maruko-chan
- Yuya Sano – professional football player
- Masanori Sekiya – racecar driver
- Hideaki Sena – novelist and pharmacologist
- Keisuke Serizawa – textile designer
- Masatoshi Shima – inventor of the microprocessor
- Kotobuki Shiriagari – Manga artist
- Tadashi Suzuki – Stage director
- Yūichi Suzumoto – novelist
- Toranosuke Takagi – racecar driver
- Nobuhiro Tanabe – politician
- Yoshito Usui – creator of Crayon Shin-chan comics
- Takahiro Yamazaki – professional baseball player
- Kaito Yamamoto – professional football player
- Takahiro Yamanishi – professional football player
- Kotaro Yamazaki – professional football player
- Takuya Yokoyama – professional football player
- Kiyoe Yoshioka – singer, vocalist of Ikimono-gakari

== City song ==
Watashi no Machi, Shizuoka (わたしの街 静岡)

- Written: 13 April 2005
- Lyrics: Citizen competition entry
- Music, additions: Kei Ogura
- Arranged: Shin Kawabe
- Eri Itō sang on the CD release
