= Naganuma Station (Shizuoka) =

Railway station in Shizuoka, Japan

Naganuma Station 長沼駅
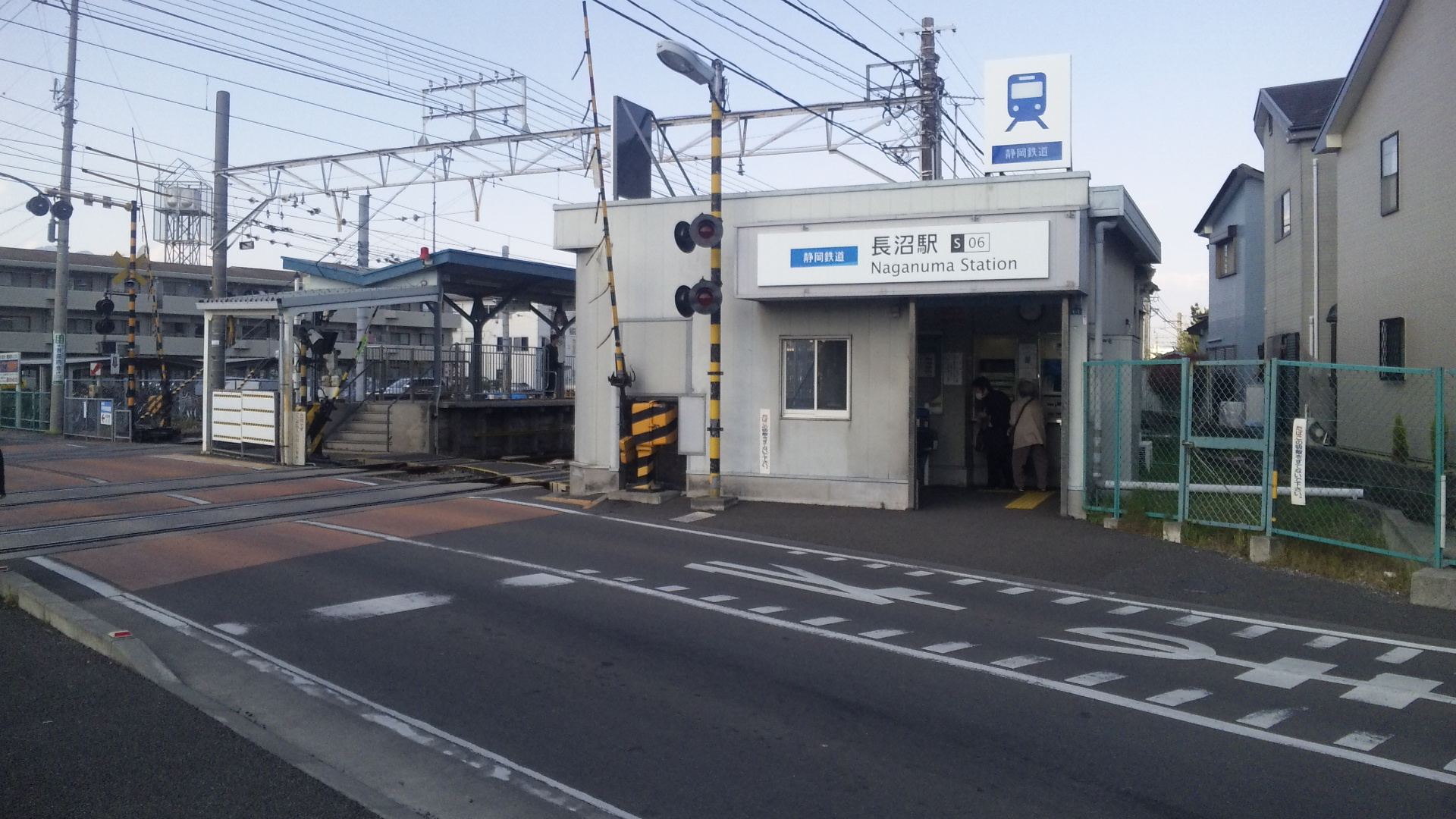
- Naganuma Station in April 2013

General information
- Location: Naganuma 1-chōme, Aoi-ku, Shizuoka-shi, Shizuoka-ken; Japan
- Coordinates: 34°59′20.02″N 138°24′45.28″E
- Operator: Shizuoka Railway
- Line: ■ Shizuoka–Shimizu Line
- Distance: 3.1 km from Shin-Shizuoka
- Platforms: 1 side + 1 island platform

Other information
- Status: Unstaffed
- Station code: S06

History
- Opened: December 9, 1908

Passengers
- FY2017: 1200 (daily)

Services
Preceding station	Shizuoka Railway	Following station
Yunoki towards Shin-Shizuoka	Shizuoka–Shimizu Line Local	Furushō towards Shin-Shimizu
Location
- Location within Shizuoka Prefecture Location within Japan

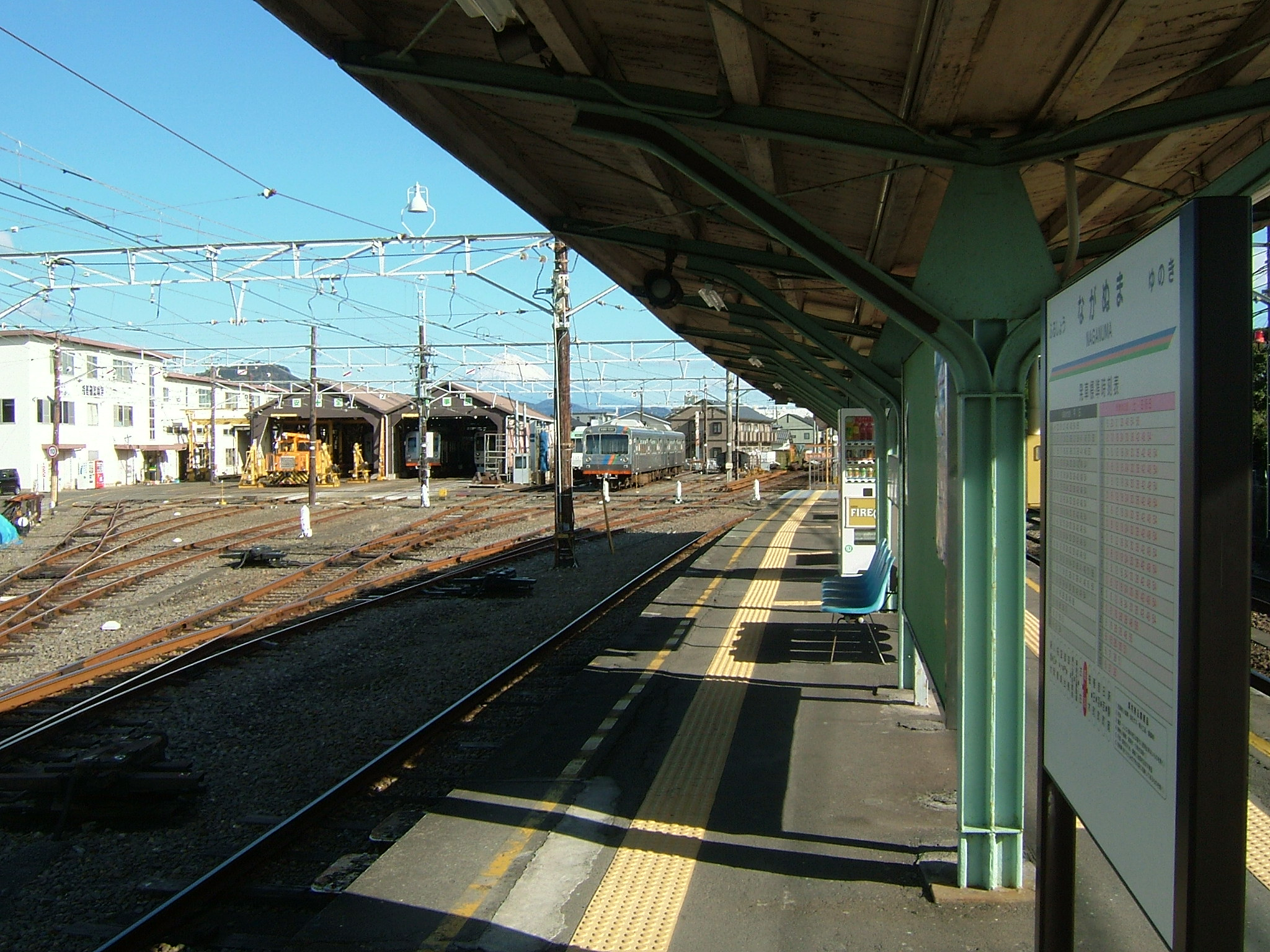
Platform

Naganuma Station (長沼駅, Naganuma-eki) is a railway station in Aoi-ku, Shizuoka, Shizuoka Prefecture, Japan, operated by the private railway company, Shizuoka Railway (Shizutetsu).

== Lines ==
Naganuma Station is a station on the Shizuoka–Shimizu Line and is 3.1 kilometers from the starting point of the line at Shin-Shizuoka Station.

== Station layout ==
The station has a single side platform and an island platform on a head shunt servicing three tracks, with a level crossing at one end. The station building, located at the end of one of the platforms, has automated ticket machines, and automated turnstiles, which accept the LuLuCa smart card ticketing system as well as the PiTaPa and ICOCA IC cards.

=== Platforms ===
1	■ Shizuoka-Shimizu Line	for Kusanagi and Shin-Shimizu
2	■ Shizuoka–Shimizu Line	for Shin-Shizuoka

== Station history ==
Naganuma Station was established on December 9, 1908.

== Passenger statistics ==
In fiscal 2017, the station was used by an average of 1200 passengers daily (boarding passengers only).

== Surrounding area ==
- North of the station is the main Rail yard of the Shizuoka–Shimizu Line.
- Higashi-Shizuoka Station on the Tōkaidō Main Line is an eight-minute walk away.

== See also ==
- List of railway stations in Japan
