= Furushō Station =

Railway station in Shizuoka, Japan

Furushō Station 古庄駅
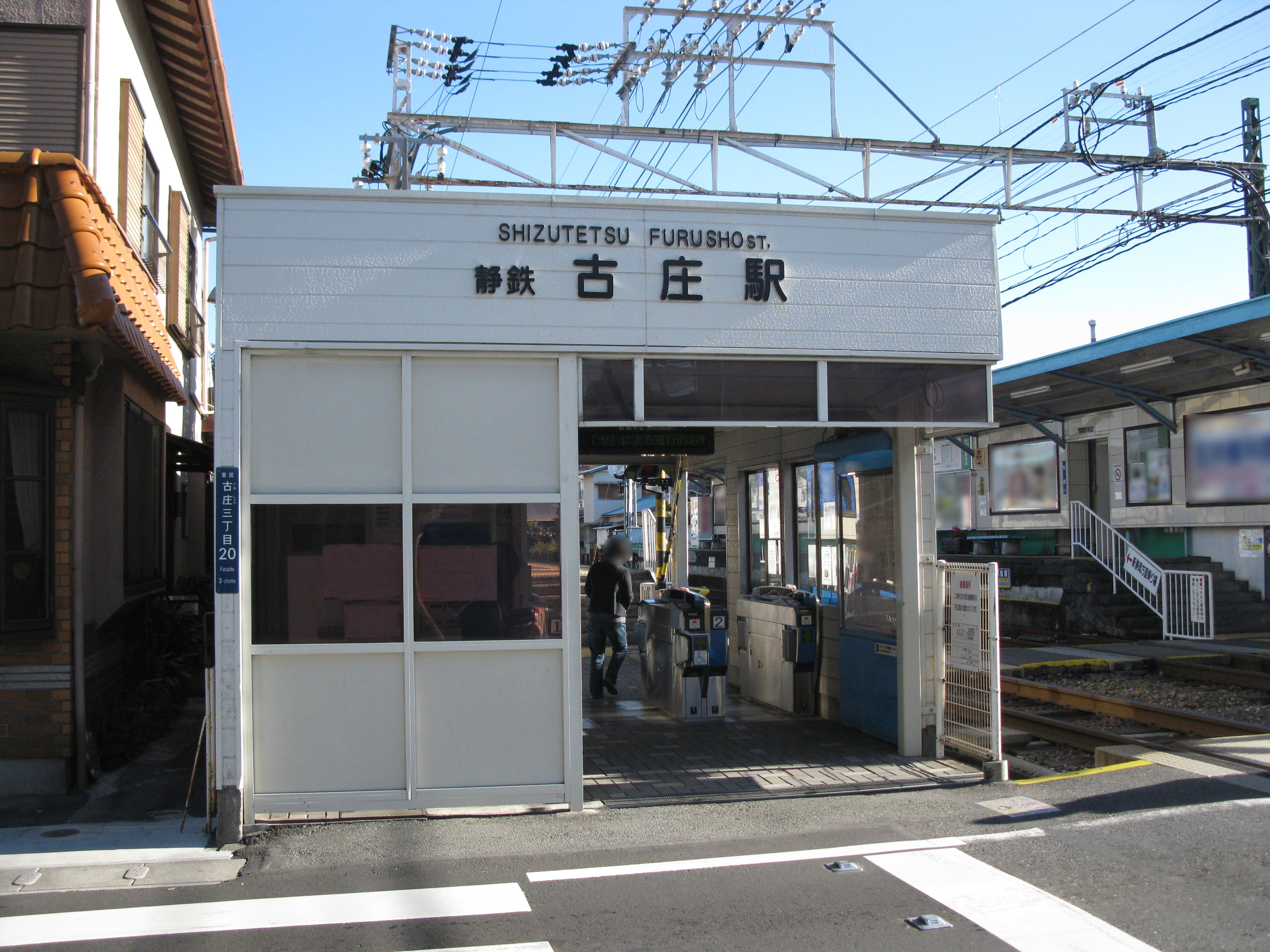
- Furushō Station in December 2010

General information
- Location: Furushō 3-chōme, Aoi-ku, Shizuoka-shi, Shizuoka-ken; Japan
- Coordinates: 34°59′33.77″N 138°25′9.46″E
- Operator: Shizuoka Railway
- Line: ■ Shizuoka–Shimizu Line
- Distance: 3.8 km from Shin-Shizuoka
- Platforms: 2 side platforms

Other information
- Status: Unstaffed
- Station code: S07

History
- Opened: December 9, 1908

Passengers
- FY2017: 1789 (daily)

Services
Preceding station	Shizuoka Railway	Following station
Hiyoshichō towards Shin-Shizuoka	Shizuoka–Shimizu Line Commuter Express	Kusanagi One-way operation
Naganuma towards Shin-Shizuoka	Shizuoka–Shimizu Line Local	Pref. Sports Park towards Shin-Shimizu
Location
- Location within Shizuoka Prefecture Location within Japan

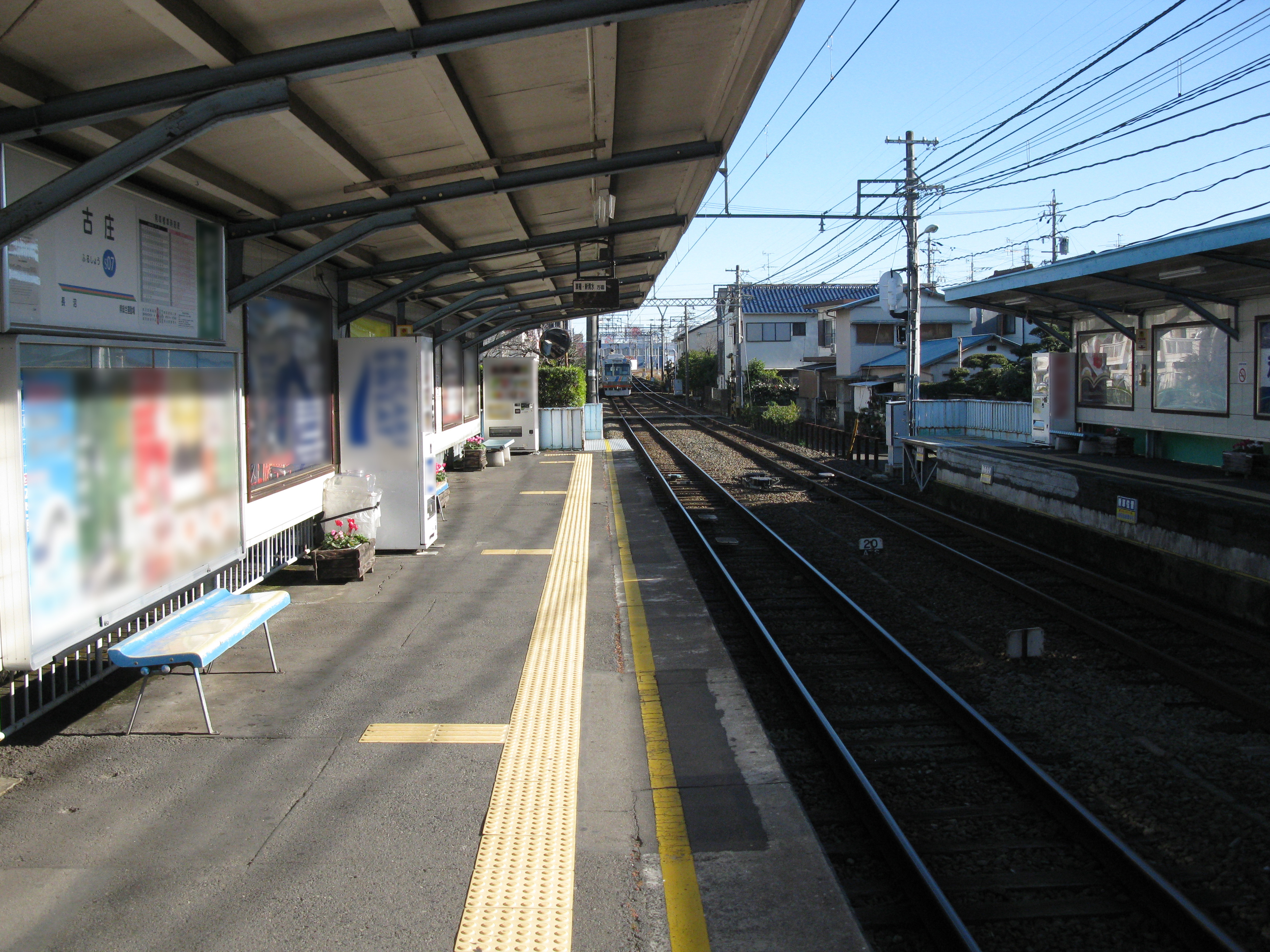
Platform

Furushō Station (古庄駅, Furushō-eki) is a railway station in Aoi-ku, Shizuoka, Shizuoka Prefecture, Japan, operated by the private railway company, Shizuoka Railway (Shizutetsu).

== Lines ==
Furushō Station is a station on the Shizuoka–Shimizu Line and is 3.8 kilometers from the starting point of the line at Shin-Shizuoka Station.

== Station layout ==
The station has two opposed side platforms, with a level crossing at one end. The station building, located at the west side of the outbound platform, has automated ticket machines, and automated turnstiles, which accept the LuLuCa smart card ticketing system as well as the PiTaPa and ICOCA IC cards. The station is not wheelchair accessible.

=== Platforms ===
1	■ Shizuoka-Shimizu Line	for Kusanagi and Shin-Shimizu
2	■ Shizuoka–Shimizu Line	for Shin-Shizuoka

== Station History ==
Furushō Station was established on December 9, 1908.

== Passenger statistics ==
In fiscal 2017, the station was used by an average of 1789 passengers daily (boarding passengers only).

== Surrounding area ==
- Shizuoka Agricultural High School

== See also ==
- List of railway stations in Japan
