= Irieoka Station =

Railway station in Shizuoka, Japan

Irieoka Station 入江岡駅
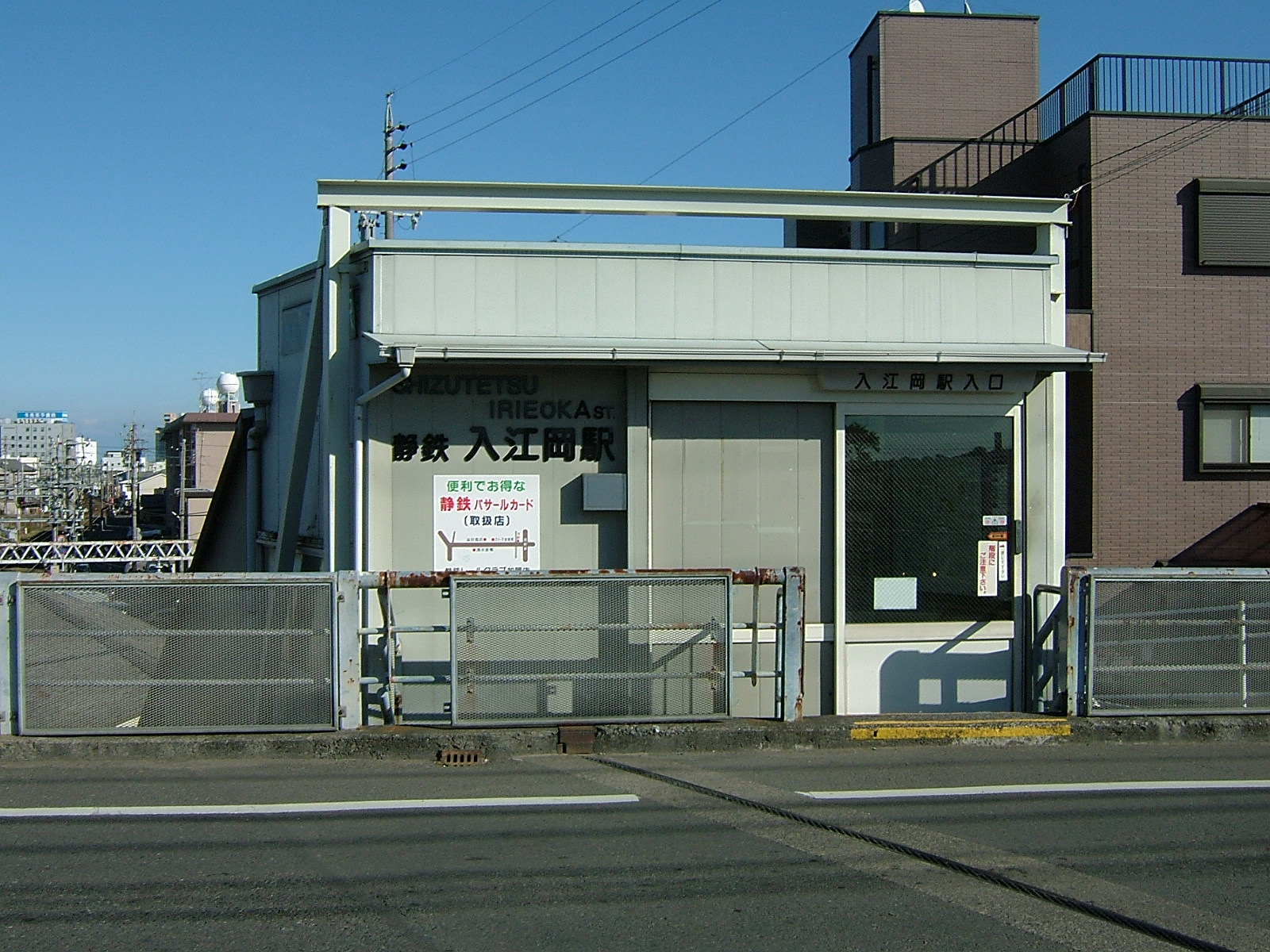
- Irieoka Station in January 2008

General information
- Location: Hamada-cho, Shimizu-ku, Shizuoka-shi, Shizuoka-ken; Japan
- Coordinates: 35.014822°N 138.480989°E
- Operator: Shizuoka Railway
- Line: ■ Shizuoka–Shimizu Line
- Distance: 10.3 km from Shin-Shizuoka
- Platforms: 1 island platform

Other information
- Station code: S14

History
- Opened: December 9, 1908
- Former names: Iriecho (to 1938)

Passengers
- FY2017: 372 (daily)

Services
Preceding station	Shizuoka Railway	Following station
Sakurabashi towards Shin-Shizuoka	Shizuoka–Shimizu Line Local	Shin-Shimizu Terminus
Location
- Location within Shizuoka Prefecture Location within Japan

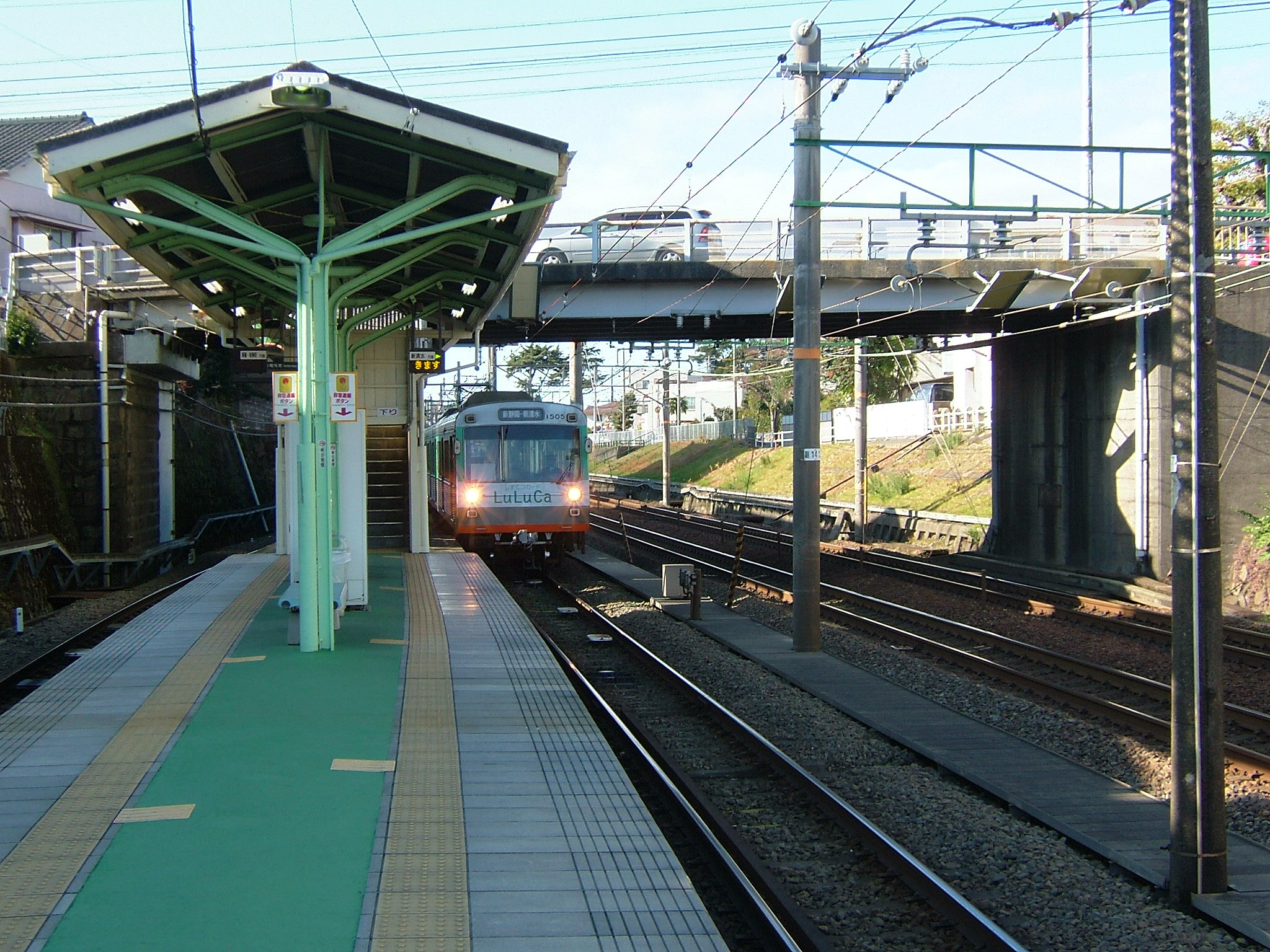
Platforms in 2009

Irieoka Station (入江岡駅, Irieoka-eki) is a railway station in Suruga-ku, Shizuoka, Shizuoka Prefecture, Japan, operated by the private railway company, Shizuoka Railway (Shizutetsu).

== Lines ==
Irieoka Station is a station on the Shizuoka–Shimizu Line and is 10.3 kilometers from the starting point of the line at Shin-Shizuoka Station.

== Station layout ==
The station has a single island platform. The station building is built on one end of the platform, and has an automated ticket machine and turnstile, which accept the LuLuCa smart card ticketing system as well as the PiTaPa and ICOCA IC cards. As the only access to the station is via stairs, the station is not wheelchair accessible.

=== Platforms ===
1	■ Shizuoka-Shimizu Line	for Shin-Shimizu
2	■ Shizuoka–Shimizu Line	for Kusanagi and Shin-Shizuoka

== History ==
Irieoka Station was established on December 9, 1908 as Iriecho Station (入江町駅). It was renamed to its present name in 1934.

== Passenger statistics ==
In fiscal 2017, the station was used by an average of 372 passengers daily (boarding passengers only).

== Surrounding area ==
- Hamada Elementary School

== See also ==
- List of railway stations in Japan
