= Pref. Sports Park Station =

Railway station in Shizuoka, Japan

Pref. Sports Park Station 県総合運動場駅
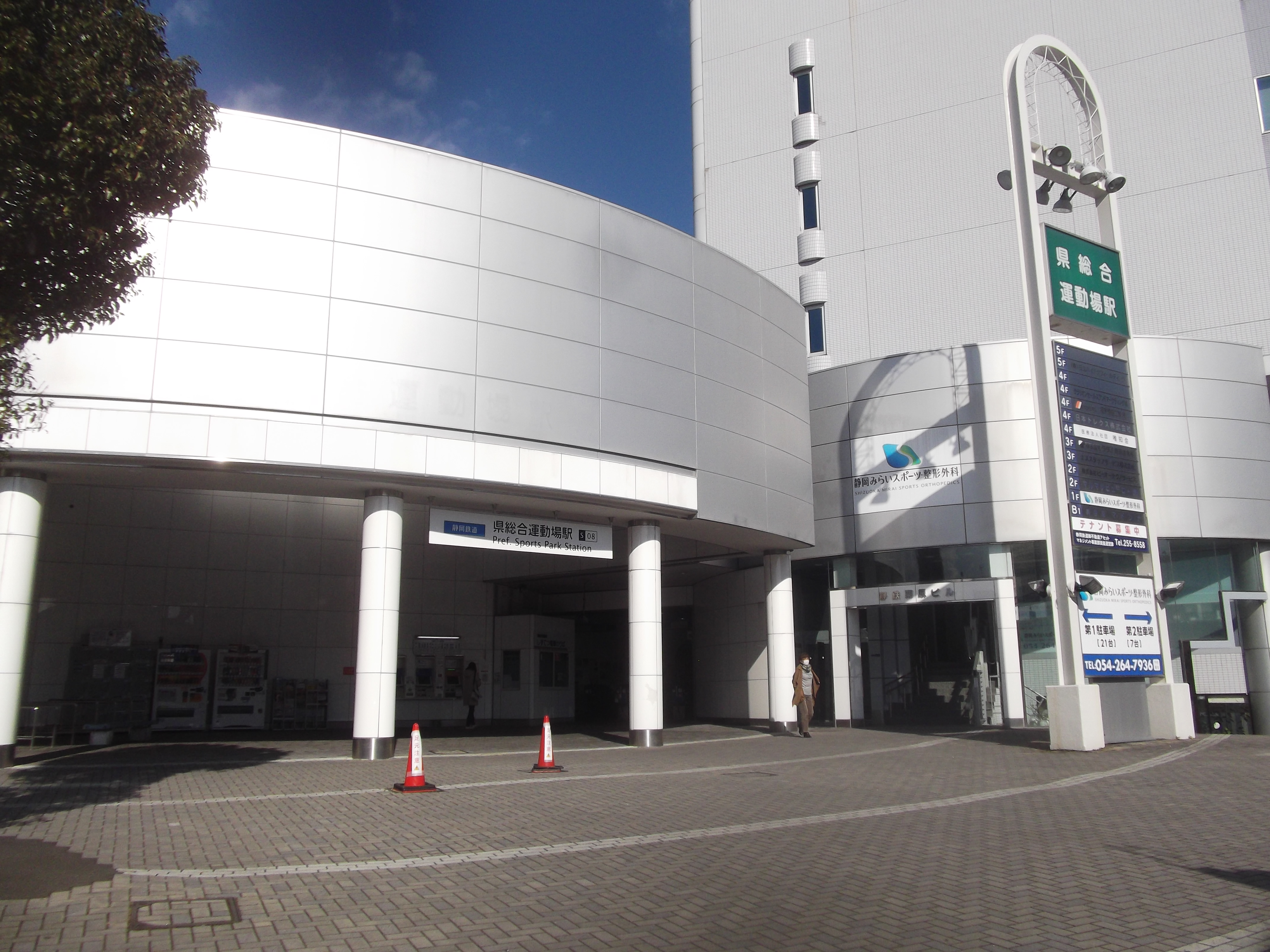
- Pref. Sports Park Station in January 2017

General information
- Location: Kurihara, Suruga-ku, Shizuoka-shi, Shizuoka-ken; Japan
- Coordinates: 34°59′36.19″N 138°25′47.64″E
- Operator: Shizuoka Railway
- Line: ■ Shizuoka–Shimizu Line
- Distance: 4.8 km from Shin-Shizuoka
- Platforms: 2 island platforms

Other information
- Station code: S08

History
- Opened: December 9, 1908
- Former names: Undōjō Mae (to 1991)

Passengers
- FY2017: 1793 (daily)

Services
Preceding station	Shizuoka Railway	Following station
Shin-Shizuoka One-way operation	Shizuoka–Shimizu Line Express	Kusanagi towards Shin-Shimizu
Furushō towards Shin-Shizuoka	Shizuoka–Shimizu Line Local	Pref. Art Museum towards Shin-Shimizu
Location
- Location within Shizuoka Prefecture Location within Japan

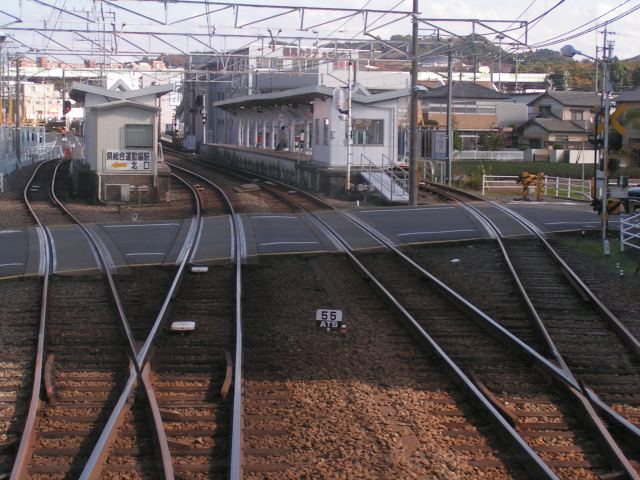
Platforms in 2005

Pref. Sports Park Station (県総合運動場駅, Ken-Sōgō Undōjō-eki) is a railway station in Suruga-ku, Shizuoka, Shizuoka Prefecture, Japan, operated by the private railway company, Shizuoka Railway (Shizutetsu).

== Lines ==
Pref. Sports Park Station is a station on the Shizuoka–Shimizu Line and is 4.8 kilometers from the starting point of the line at Shin-Shizuoka Station.

== Station layout ==
The station has two island platforms, with 2 tracks for each direction, to allow for the passing of express trains in either direction. The main entrance and station building, located within an office building to the west of the platforms, has automated ticket machines, and automated turnstiles, which accept the LuLuCa smart card ticketing system as well as the PiTaPa and ICOCA IC cards. An underground passageway connects the office building to the platforms. A secondary entrance is also located directly north of the platforms. Neither entrance is wheelchair accessible.

=== Platforms ===
1, 2	■ Shizuoka-Shimizu Line	for Kusanagi and Shin-Shimizu
3, 4	■ Shizuoka–Shimizu Line	for Shin-Shizuoka

== Station History ==
Ken-Sōgō Undōjō Station was established on December 9, 1908, as Undōjō Mae Station (運動場前駅). The station was reconstructed and renamed in 1991.

== Passenger statistics ==
In fiscal 2017, the station was used by an average of 1793 passengers daily (boarding passengers only).

== Surrounding area ==
- Kusanagi Athletic Stadium
- Konohana Arena
- TV Shizuoka

== See also ==
- List of railway stations in Japan
