= Shizuoka Railway Shizuoka–Shimizu Line =

Railway line in Shizuoka, Shizuoka prefecture, Japan

Shizuoka-Shimizu Line
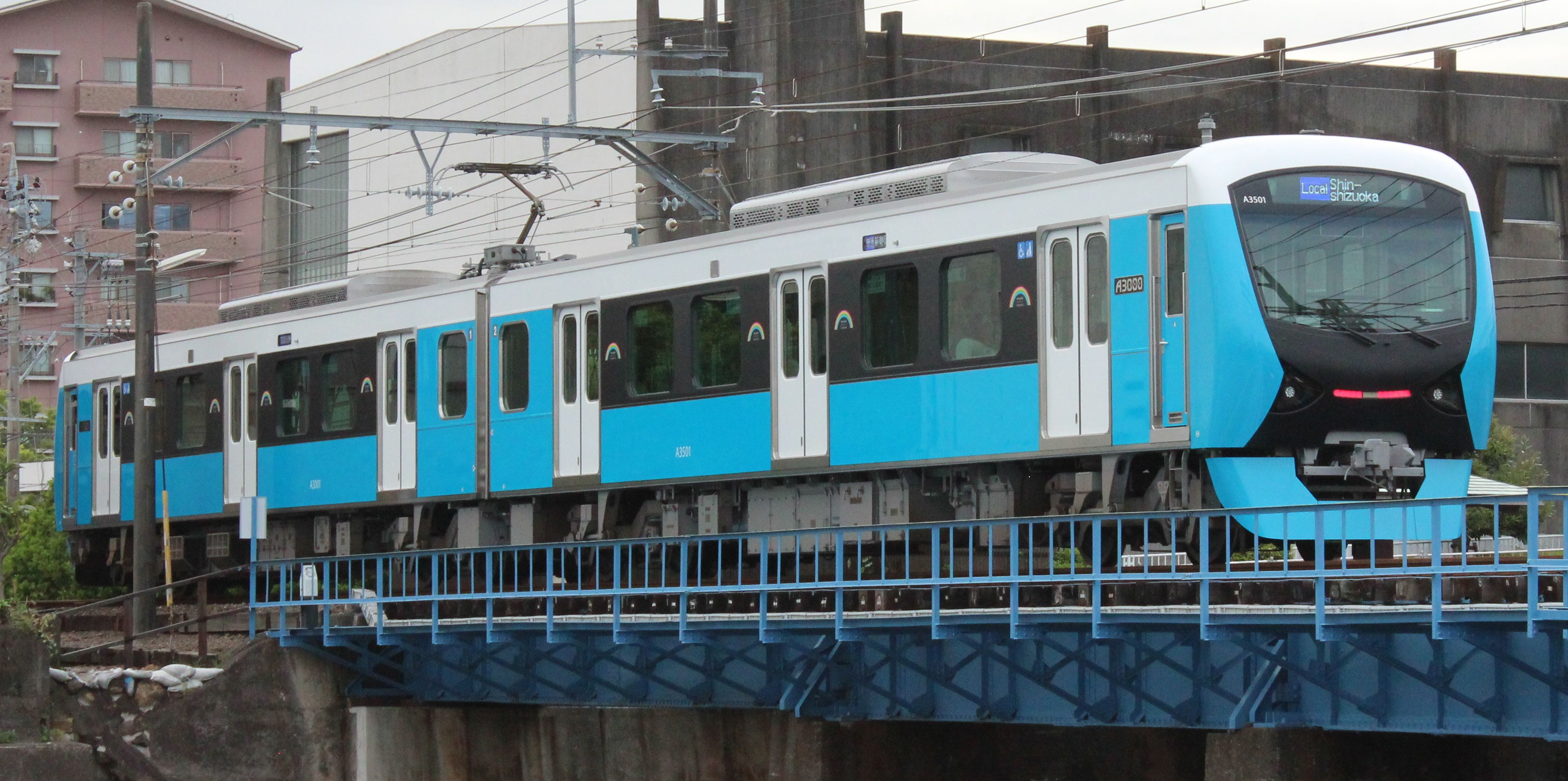
- A 3000 series EMU

Overview
- Native name: 静岡清水線
- Locale: Shizuoka, Shizuoka Prefecture, Japan
- Termini: Shizuoka; Shin-Shimizu
- Stations: 15

Service
- Operator(s): Shizuoka Railway

History
- Opened: May 18, 1908

Technical
- Line length: 11 km (6.8 mi)
- Number of tracks: double
- Track gauge: 1,067 mm (3 ft 6 in)
- Electrification: 600 V DC, overhead catenary

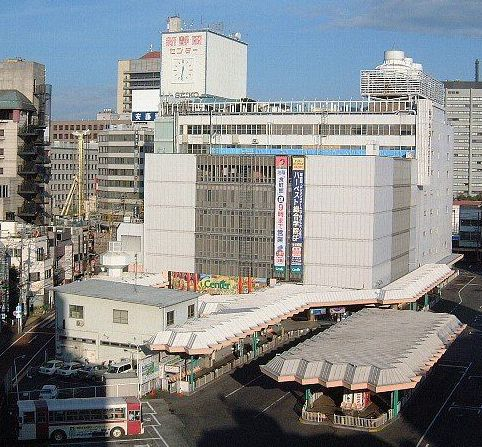
Shin-Shizuoka station, built with Shinshizuoka-Center Department Store, a part of Shizutetsu Group

Line map

The Shizuoka–Shimizu Line (静岡清水線, Shizuoka-Shimizu-sen) is a railway line in Shizuoka Prefecture, between Shin-Shizuoka in Aoi Ward and Shin-Shimizu in Shimizu Ward, all within the city of Shizuoka. This is the only line operated by the private railway operator Shizuoka Railway (Shizutetsu).

== Services ==
The line has a fairly frequent service, with local services operating every 5–6 minutes during rush hours, and every 6–8 minutes during the daytime and on weekends, linking Shin-Shizuoka and Shin-Shimizu in 22 minutes. In addition, express services run in the mornings every 12 minutes, linking the two stations in 16–18 minutes. All the train sets are formed of two cars, and are driver-only operated. All the stations accept LuLuCa, a smart card ticketing system. They accept Suica, Toica, PiTaPa and ICOCA as well.

== Stations ==
● indicate that the service will stop at that station,

↑ ↓ indicate that it will pass the station.

No.	Station	Japanese	Distance (km)	Commuter Express	Express	Transfers	Location
S01	Shin-Shizuoka	新静岡	0.0	●	●	Tōkaidō Shinkansen; Tōkaidō Main Line (at Shizuoka)	Aoi-ku, Shizuoka
S02	Hiyoshichō	日吉町	0.3	●	↓		Aoi-ku, Shizuoka
S03	Otowachō	音羽町	0.8	↑	↓		Aoi-ku, Shizuoka
S04	Kasugachō	春日町	1.5	↑	↓		Aoi-ku, Shizuoka
S05	Yunoki	柚木	2.0	↑	↓		Aoi-ku, Shizuoka
S06	Naganuma	長沼	3.1	↑	↓	Tōkaidō Main Line (at Higashi-Shizuoka)	Aoi-ku, Shizuoka
S07	Furushō	古庄	3.8	●	↓		Aoi-ku, Shizuoka
S08	Pref. Sports Park	県総合運動場	4.8	↑	●		Suruga-ku, Shizuoka
S09	Pref. Art Museum	県立美術館前	5.7	↑	↓		Shimizu-ku, Shizuoka
S10	Kusanagi	草薙	6.4	●	●	Tōkaidō Main Line	Shimizu-ku, Shizuoka
S11	Mikadodai	御門台	7.4	●	●		Shimizu-ku, Shizuoka
S12	Kitsunegasaki	狐ヶ崎	8.3	●	●		Shimizu-ku, Shizuoka
S13	Sakurabashi	桜橋	10.0	●	●		Shimizu-ku, Shizuoka
S14	Irieoka	入江岡	10.3	↑	↓		Shimizu-ku, Shizuoka
S15	Shin-Shimizu	新清水	11.0	●	●	Tōkaidō Main Line (at Shimizu)	Shimizu-ku, Shizuoka

== Rolling stock ==
- A3000 series EMUs

The first of a new fleet of A3000 series two-car electric multiple unit (EMU) trains entered service on 24 March 2016.

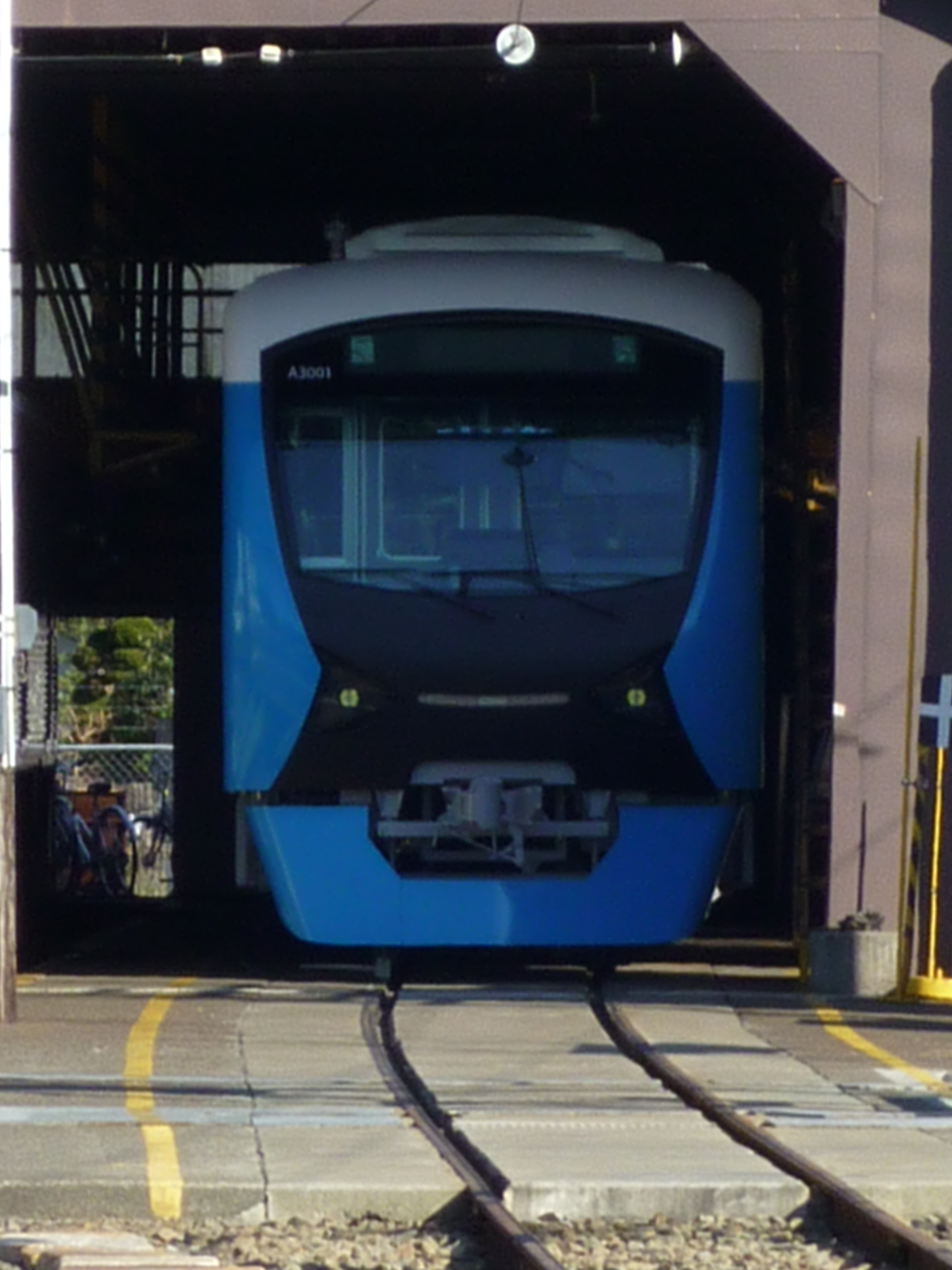
A3000 series set A3001 in December 2015

=== Former ===
- 1000 series EMUs (until 30 June 2024)

== History ==
The line opened in 1908 as a 762 mm (2 ft 6 in) gauge line to the Shin-Shimizu wharf, and was regauged to 1,067 mm (3 ft 6 in) and electrified at 600 V DC in 1920. The line was double-tracked in sections between 1925 and 1930 except the section to the wharf, which closed in 1945.

CTC signalling was commissioned in 1979.

== See also ==
- Nihondaira Ropeway
- List of railway lines in Japan
