= Kusanagi Station (Shizuoka Railway) =

Railway station in Shizuoka, Japan

Kusanagi Station 草薙駅
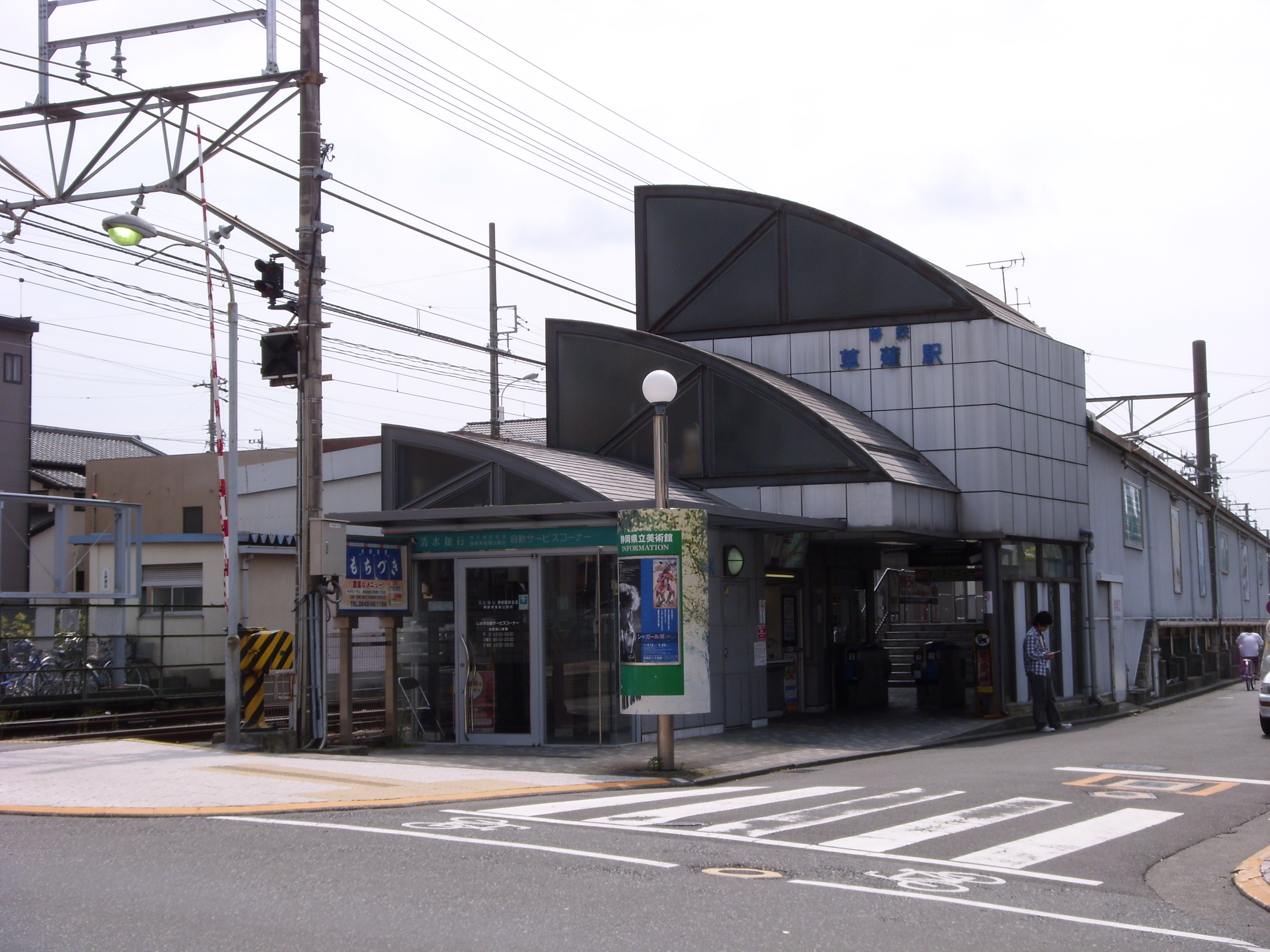
- Kusanagi Station, April 2008

General information
- Location: Kusanagi 1-chōme, Shimizu-ku, Shizuoka-shi, Shizuoka-ken; Japan
- Coordinates: 35.001453°N 138.442696°E
- Operator: Shizuoka Railway
- Line: ■ Shizuoka–Shimizu Line
- Distance: 6.4 km from Shin-Shizuoka
- Platforms: 2 side platforms

Other information
- Station code: S10

History
- Opened: December 9, 1908

Passengers
- FY2017: 3797 (daily)

Services
Preceding station	Shizuoka Railway	Following station
Furushō towards Shin-Shizuoka	Shizuoka–Shimizu Line Commuter Express	Mikadodai One-way operation
Pref. Sports Park One-way operation	Shizuoka–Shimizu Line Express	Mikadodai towards Shin-Shimizu
Pref. Art Museum towards Shin-Shizuoka	Shizuoka–Shimizu Line Local	Mikadodai towards Shin-Shimizu
Location
- Location within Shizuoka Prefecture Location within Japan

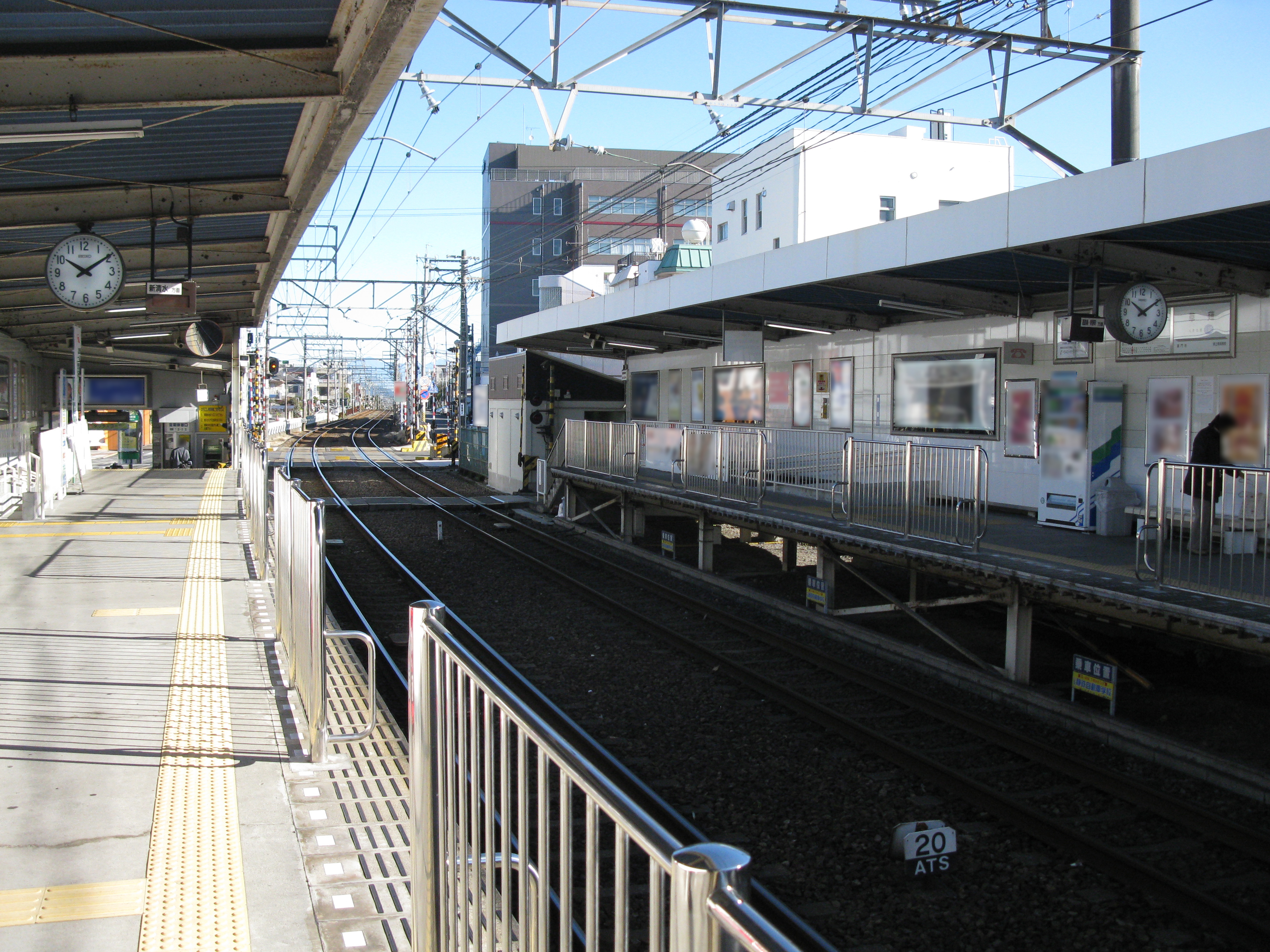
Platforms in 2005

Kusanagi Station (草薙駅, Kusanagi-eki) is a railway station in Shimizu-ku, Shizuoka, Shizuoka Prefecture, Japan, operated by the private railway company, Shizuoka Railway (Shizutetsu).

== Lines ==
Kusanagi Station is a station on the Shizuoka–Shimizu Line and is 6.4 kilometers from the starting point of the line at Shin-Shizuoka Station.

Connection to Kusanagi Station on the Tōkaidō Main Line is possible, with the two stations situated just 150m apart.

== Station layout ==
The station has two side platforms. The station building is located on the north side of the Shin-Shimizu direction platform, and it had automated ticket machines, and automated turnstiles, which accept the LuLuCa smart card ticketing system as well as the PiTaPa, TOICA, and ICOCA IC cards. The station is wheelchair accessible.

=== Platforms ===
1	■ Shizuoka-Shimizu Line	for Shin-Shimizu
2	■ Shizuoka–Shimizu Line	for Shin-Shizuoka

== Station history ==
Kusanagi Station was established on December 9, 1908.

== Passenger statistics ==
In fiscal 2017, the station was used by an average of 3797 passengers daily (boarding passengers only).

== Surrounding area ==
- Shizuoka Bank head office
- Kusanagi Station
- University of Shizuoka

== See also ==
- List of railway stations in Japan
