= Shizuoka Railway A3000 series =

Japanese train type introduced in 2016

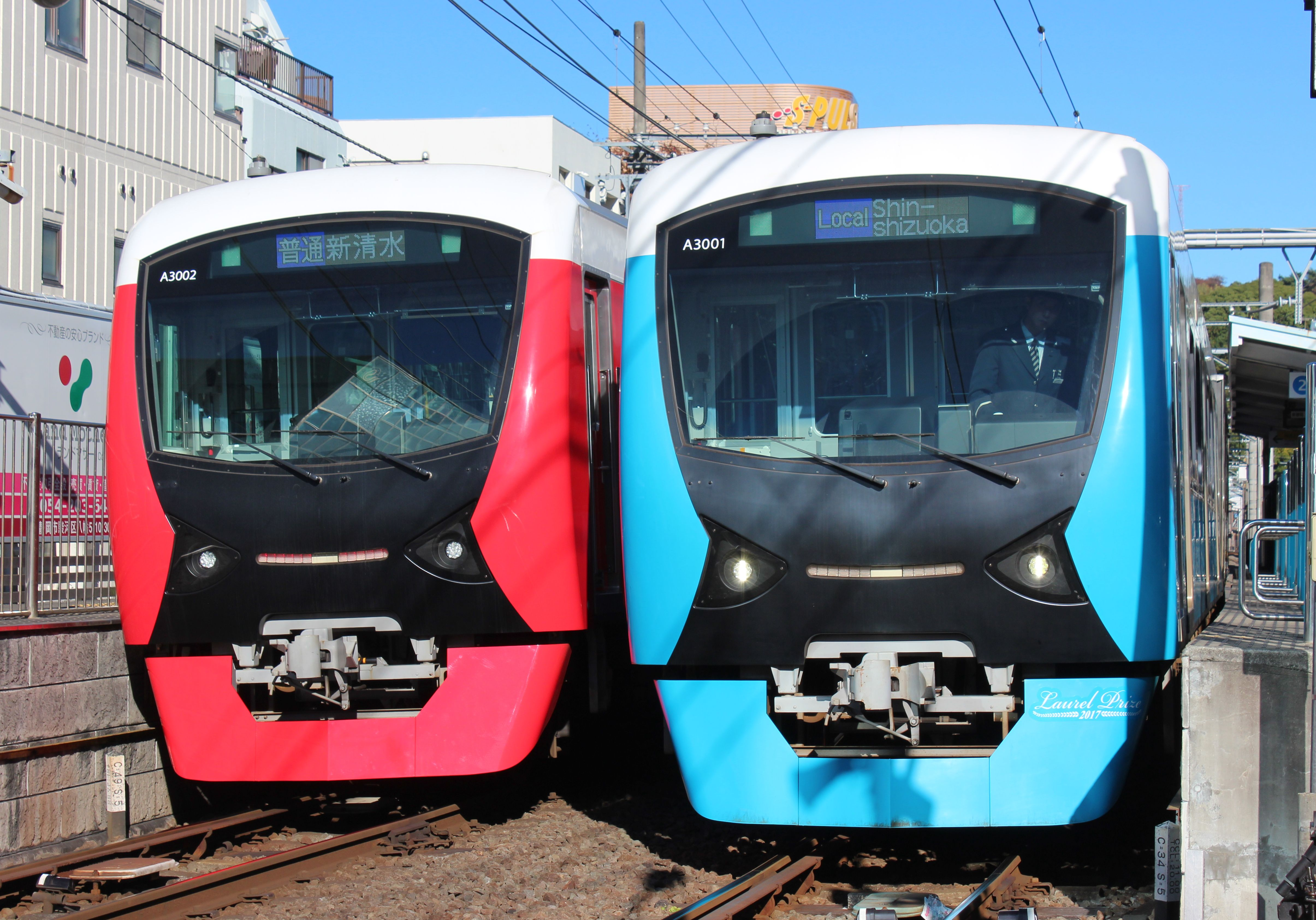
- Sets A3002 (left) and A3001 (right) in November 2017
- Manufacturer: J-TREC
- Built at: Yokohama
- Family name: Sustina
- Replaced: 1000 series
- Constructed: 2015–2024
- Entered service: 24 March 2016
- Number built: 24 cars (12 sets)
- Formation: 2 cars per set
- Operator: Shizuoka Railway
- Line served: Shizuoka Railway Shizuoka–Shimizu Line

Specifications
- Car body construction: Stainless steel
- Car length: 18,000 mm (59 ft 1 in)
- Width: 2,740 mm (9 ft 0 in)
- Height: 4,015 mm (13 ft 2.1 in)
- Doors: 3 pairs per side
- Maximum speed: 90 km/h (55 mph)
- Electric systems: 600 V DC (overhead wire)
- Current collection: Pantograph
- Bogies: TS-840 (motored), TS-841 (trailer)
- Track gauge: 1,067 mm (3 ft 6 in)

The Shizuoka Railway A3000 series (静岡鉄道A3000形, Shizuoka Tetsudō A3000-gata) is a DC electric multiple unit (EMU) train operated by the private railway operator Shizuoka Railway in Shizuoka Prefecture, Japan, since 24 March 2016.

== Design ==
The two-car EMU sets are built at J-TREC's Yokohama factory and based on the manufacturer's "Sustina" family of stainless steel-bodied trains. Seven of the 12 trains are finished in different colour liveries, including "Clear Blue", "Elegant Blue", "Passion Red", "Pretty Pink", "Brilliant Orange Yellow", "Fresh Green", and "Natural Green". The other five sets are finished in predominantly unpainted stainless steel, similar to the company's 1000 series trains.

== Operations ==
The A3000 series trains operate on the 11.0 km (6.8 mi) Shizuoka Railway Shizuoka–Shimizu Line in Shizuoka Prefecture, which runs between Shin-Shizuoka and Shin-Shimizu. A total of twelve two-car trains are scheduled to be introduced over a period of eight years, replacing the company's older 1000 series trains.

== Formation ==
The two-car sets are formed as shown below, with one motored car and one non-powered trailer car. The motored "Mc" car is at the Shin-Shizuoka end.

Car No.	1	2
Designation	Mc	Tc
Numbering	KuMoHa A30xx	KuHa A35xx
Weight (t)	34.3	29.5
Capacity (total/seated)	119/39	119/39

The KuMoHa car is fitted with a single-arm pantograph.

== Interior ==
Passenger accommodation consists of longitudinal bench seating throughout. Wheelchair spaces are provided in both cars.

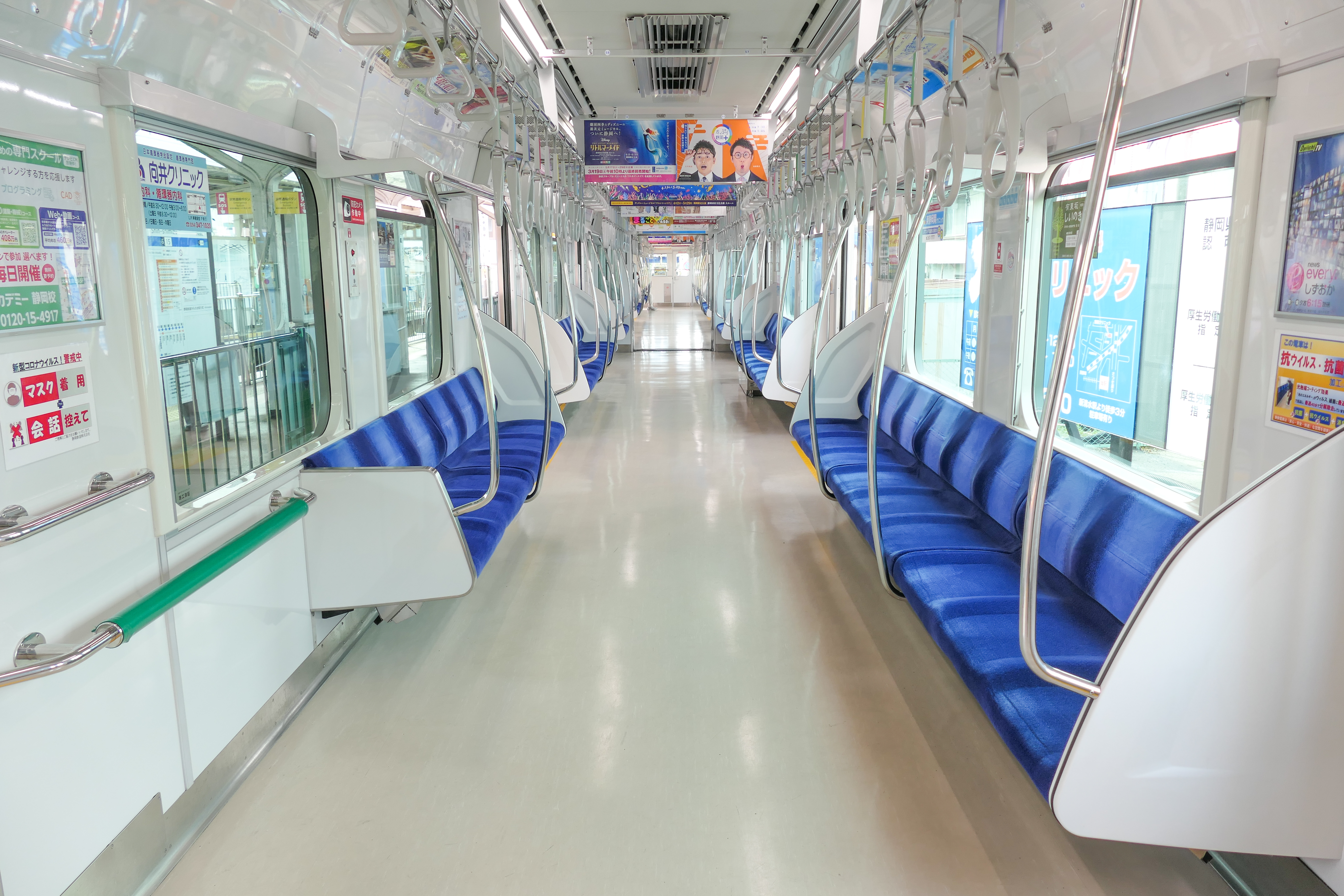
Interior

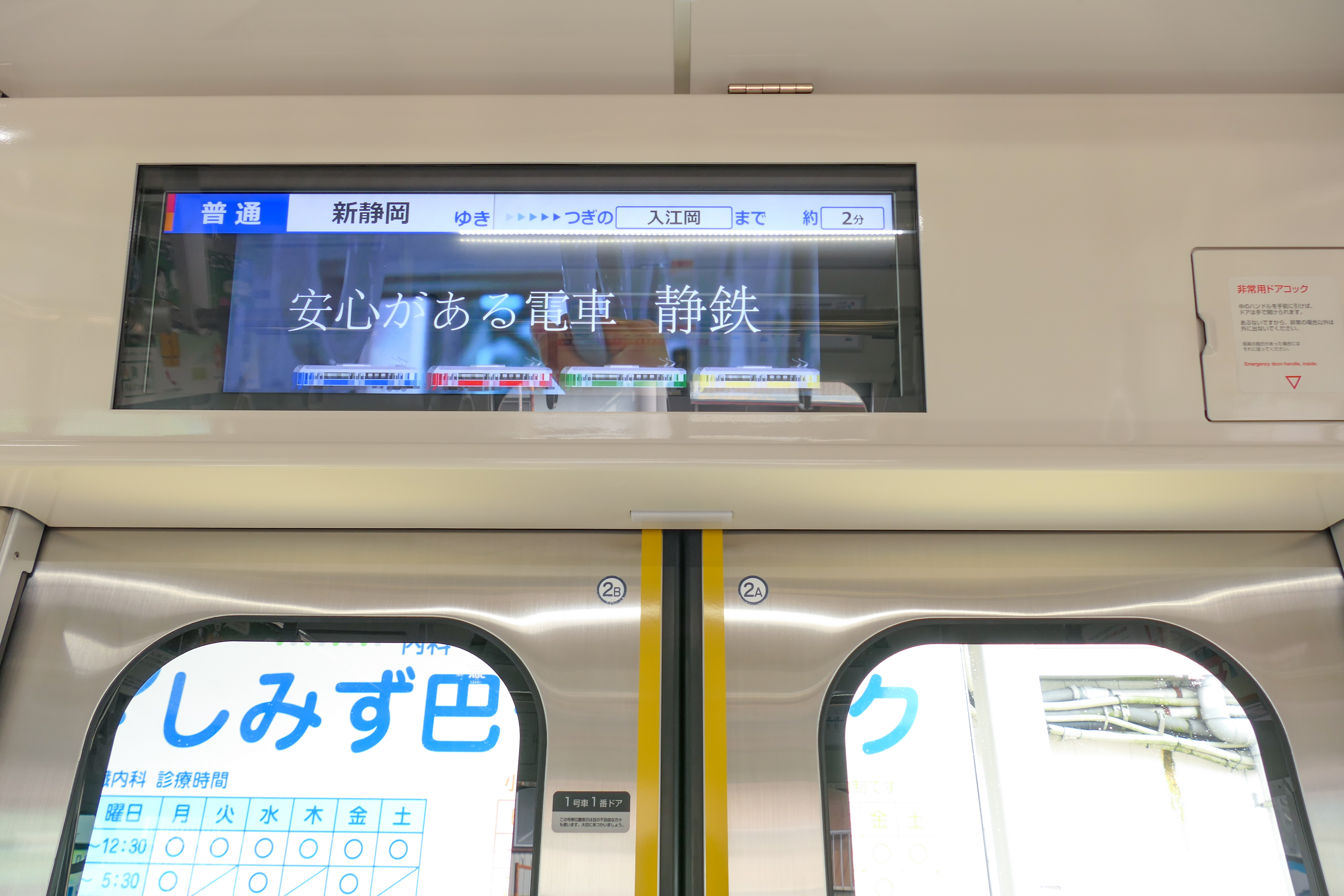
Passenger information display

== History ==
The first trainset, A3001, was delivered in December 2015, hauled by rail from Zushi in Kanagawa Prefecture to the JR Freight terminal at Fuji, and then by road to the Shizuoka Railway. In May 2017, the A3000 series was awarded the 2017 Laurel Prize, presented annually by the Japan Railfan Club.

The final trainset, A3012, was delivered in February 2024.

== Fleet details ==
Set No.	Manufacturer	Delivery date	Service entry date	Livery
A3001	J-TREC, Yokohama	December 2015	March 2016	Clear Blue
A3002	J-TREC, Yokohama	January 2017	24 March 2017	Passion Red
A3003	J-TREC, Yokohama	January 2018	21 March 2018	Natural Green
A3004	J-TREC, Yokohama	January 2018	21 March 2018	Brilliant Orange Yellow
A3005	J-TREC, Yokohama	January 2019	9 March 2019	Elegant Blue
A3006	J-TREC, Yokohama	January 2019	9 March 2019	100th anniversary
A3007	J-TREC, Yokohama	January 2020	7 March 2020	Pretty Pink
A3008	J-TREC, Yokohama	January 2020	7 March 2020	Fresh Green
A3009			6 March 2021	Unpainted
A3010			6 March 2021	Unpainted
A3011	J-TREC, Yokohama	February 2023		Unpainted
A3012	J-TREC, Yokohama	February 2024		Unpainted

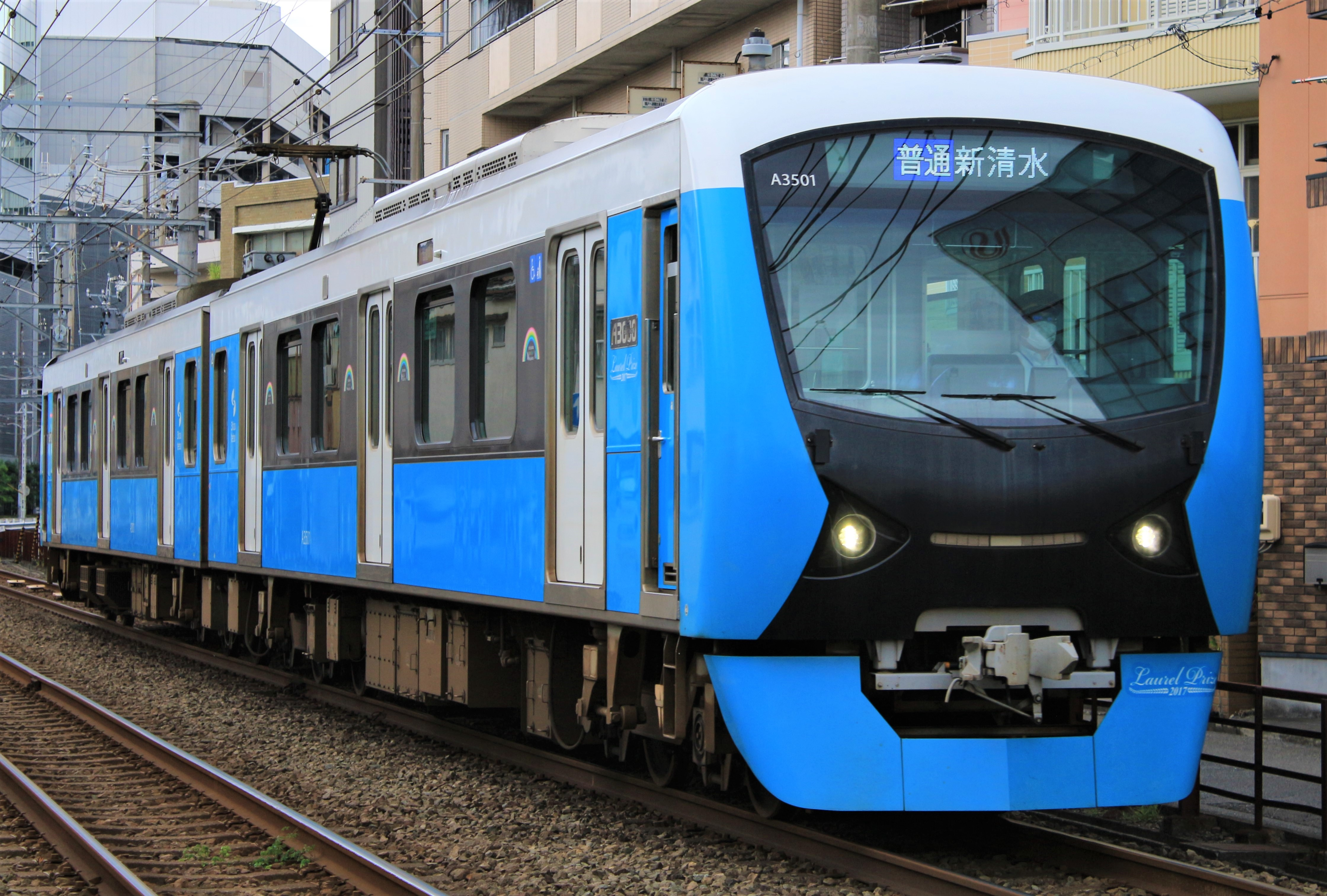
"Clear Blue" liveried set A3001 in August 2021

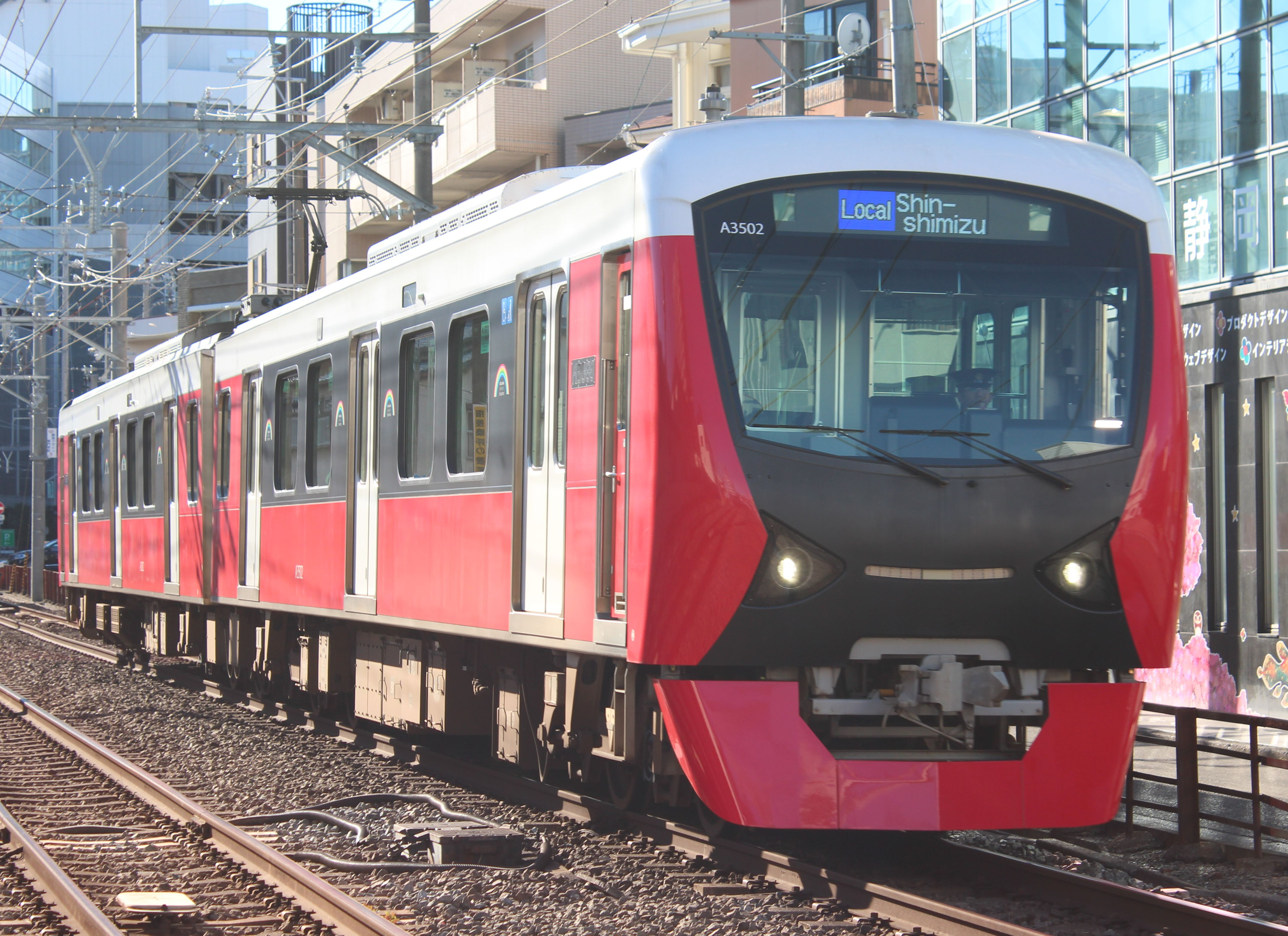
"Passion Red" liveried set A3002 in August 2021

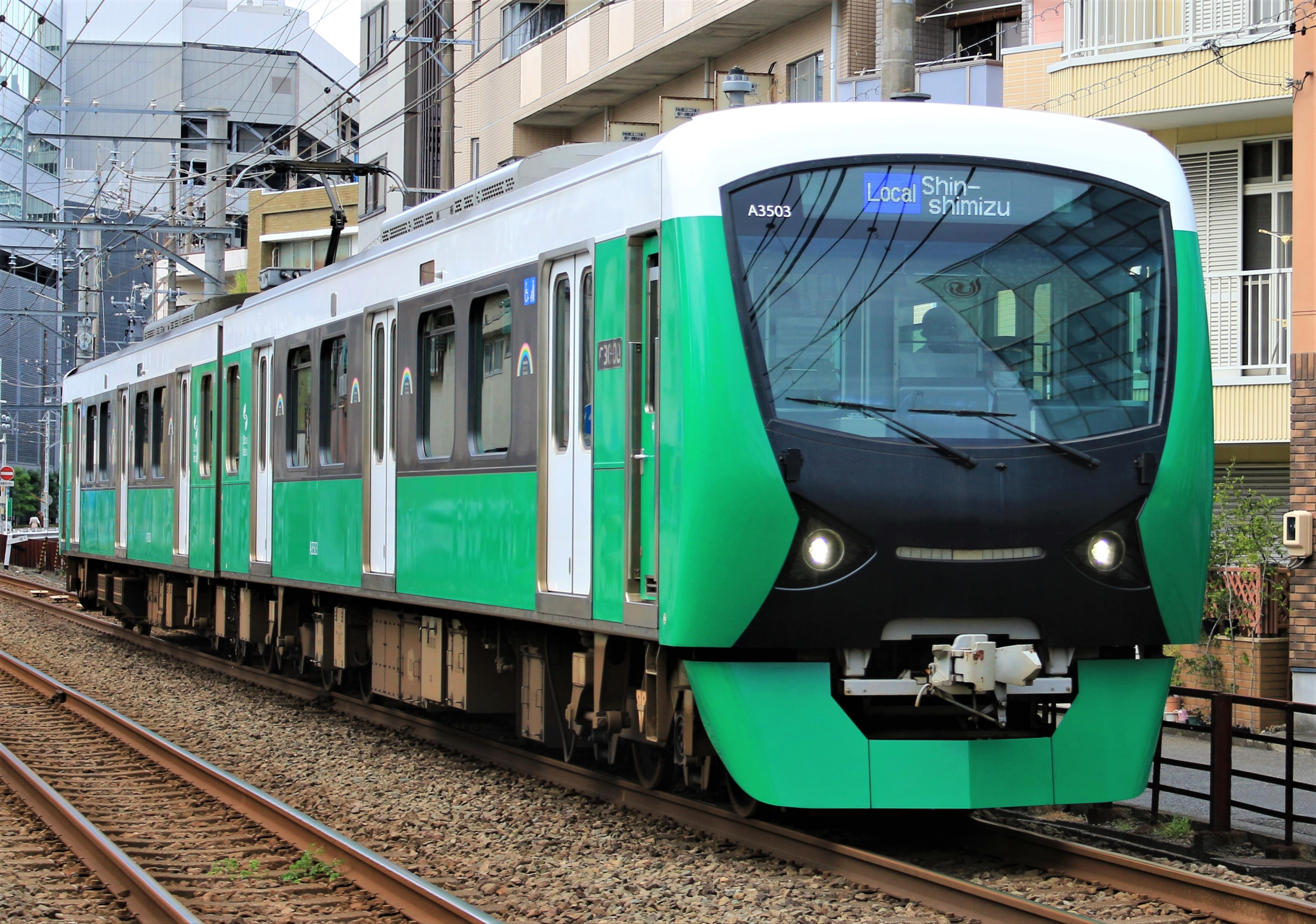
"Natural Green" liveried set A3003 in August 2021

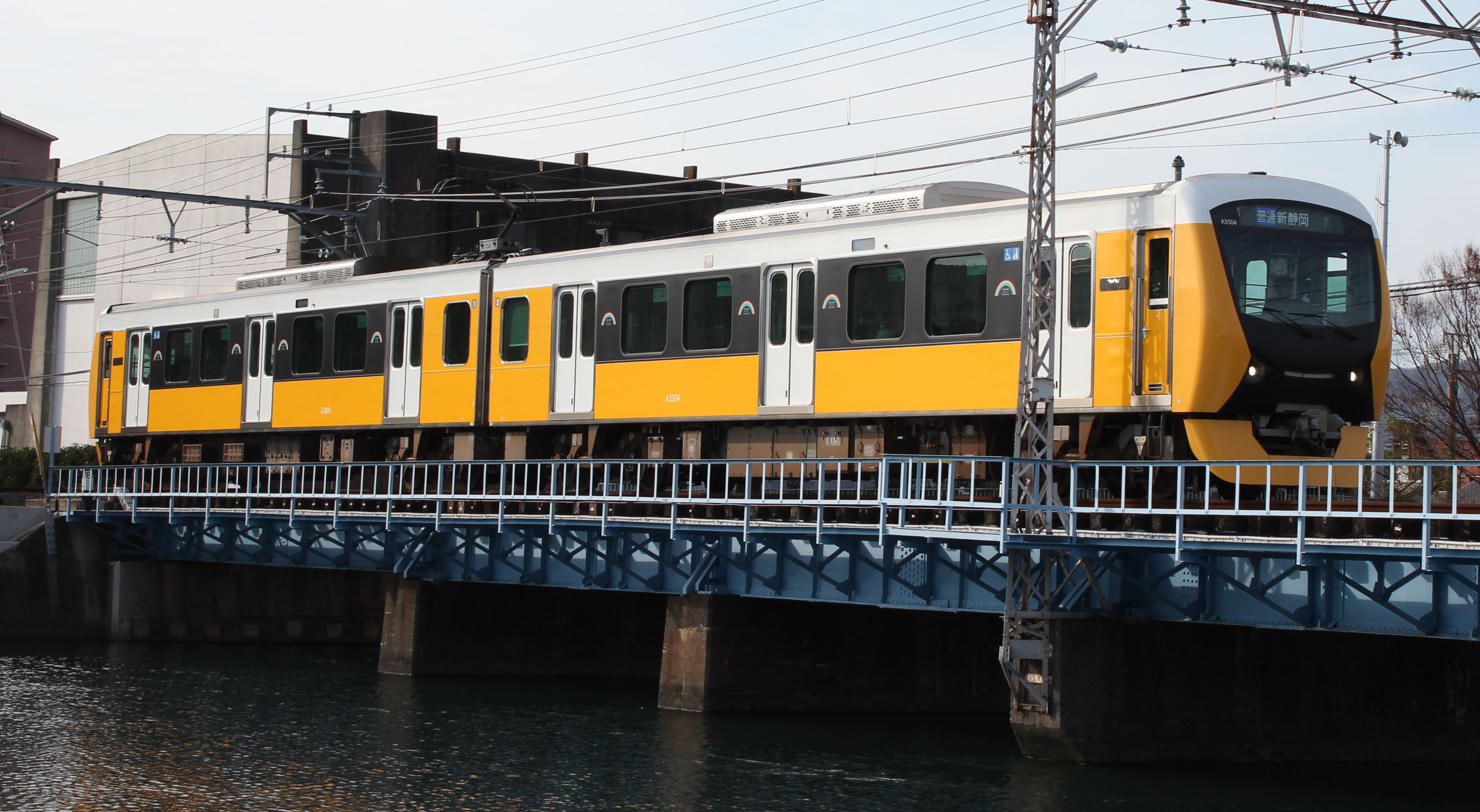
"Brilliant Orange Yellow" liveried set A3004 in November 2018

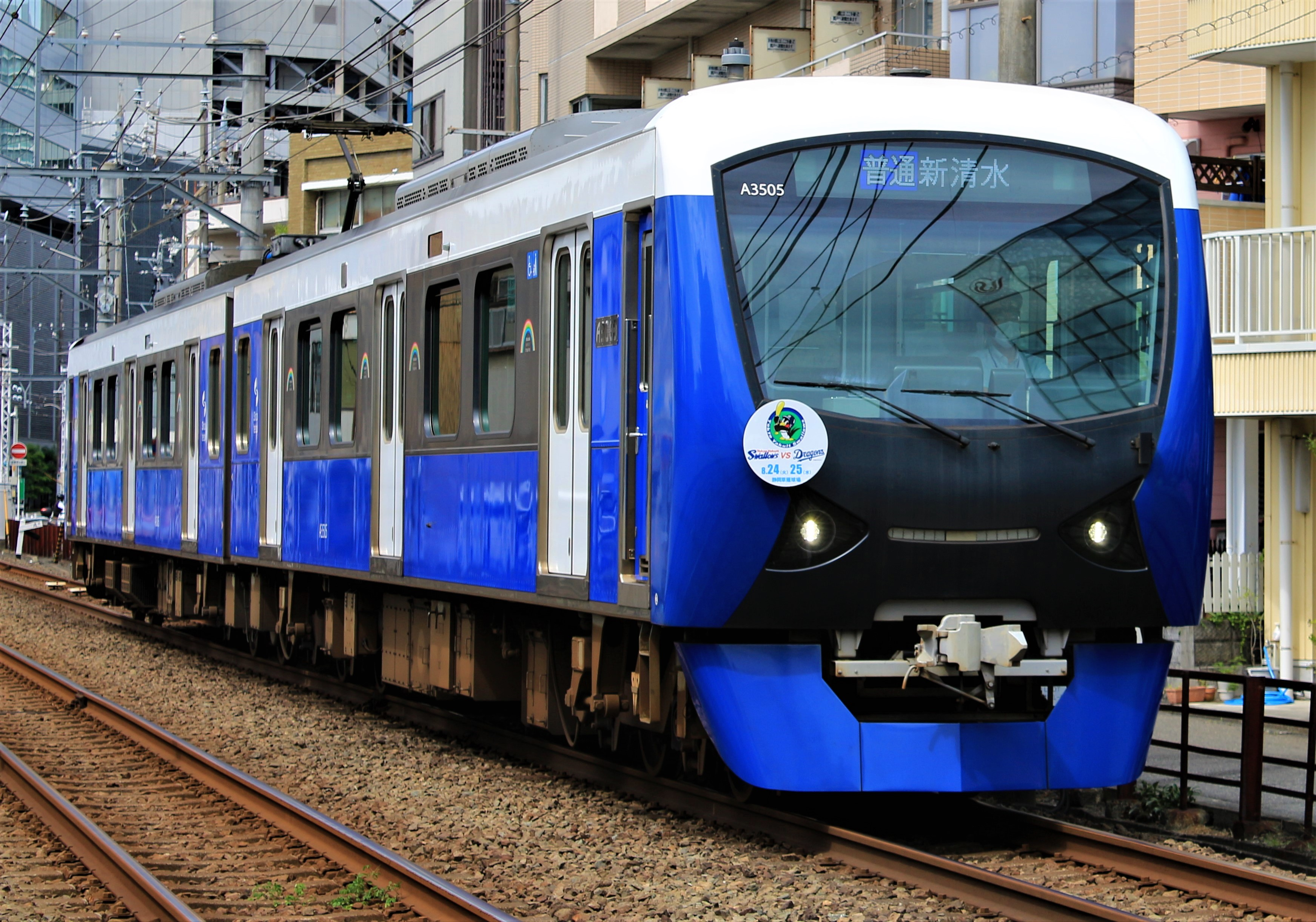
"Elegant Blue" liveried set A3005 in August 2021

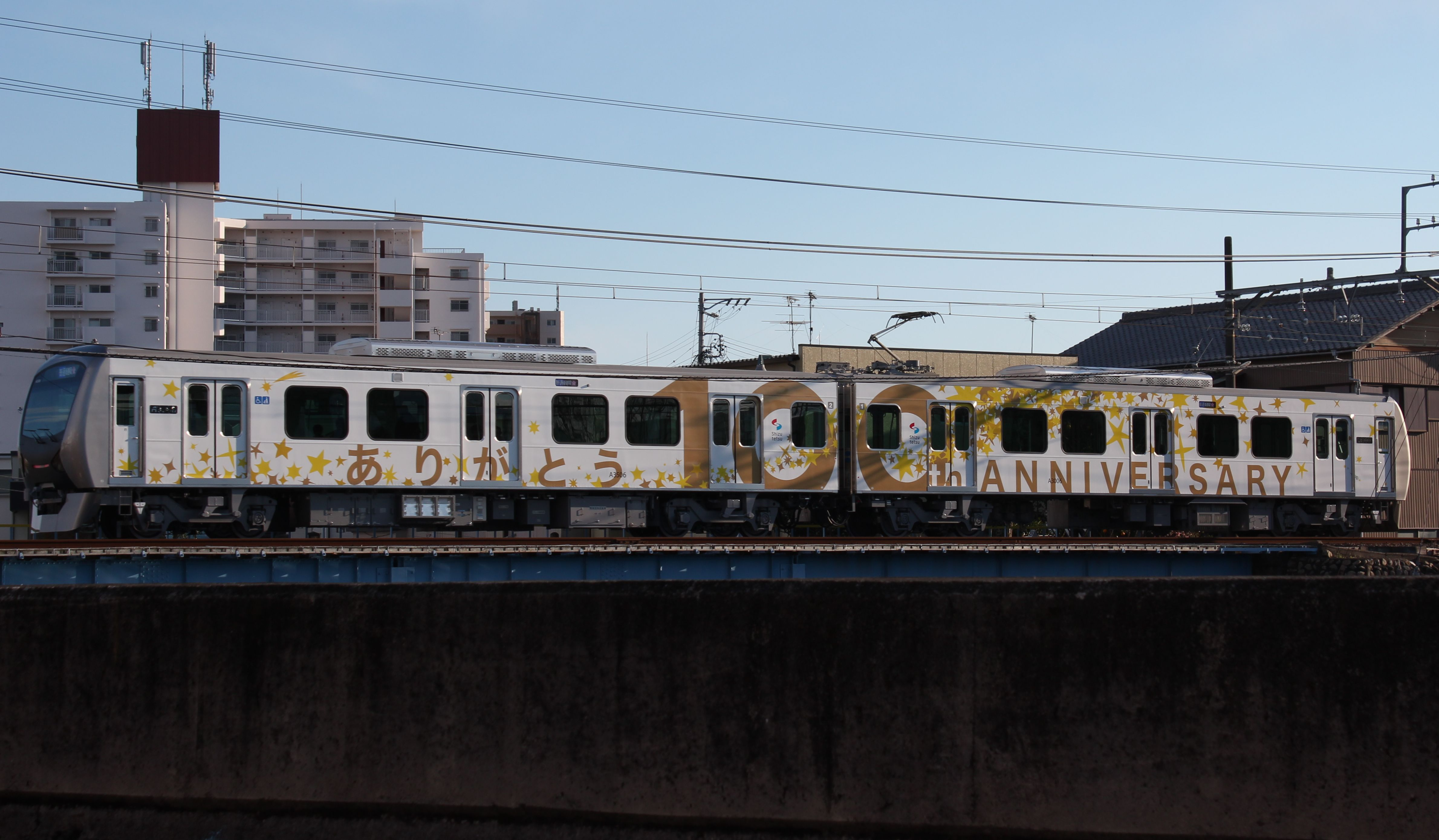
Set A3006 with 100th anniversary livery in March 2019

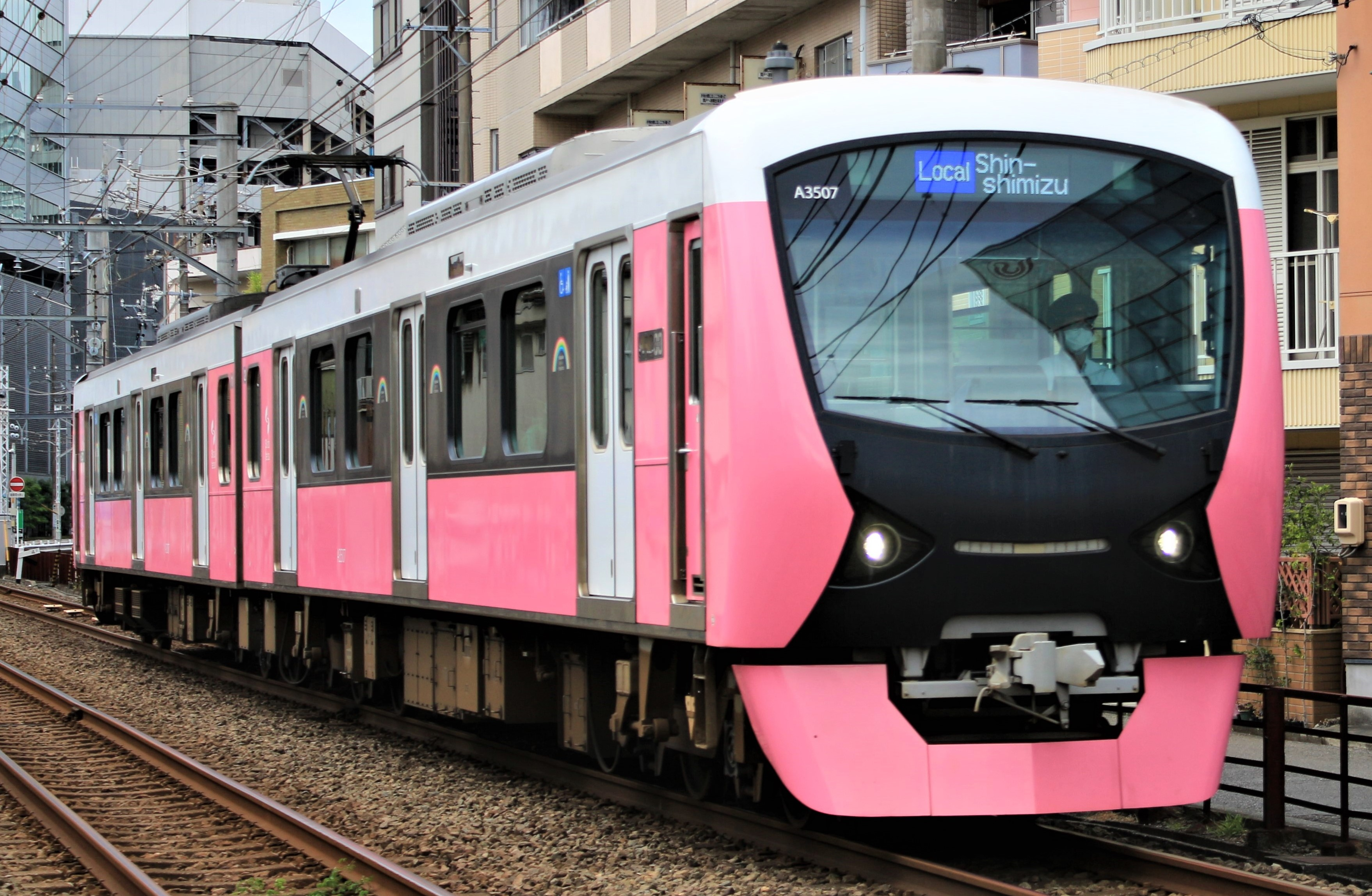
"Pretty Pink" liveried set A3007 in August 2021

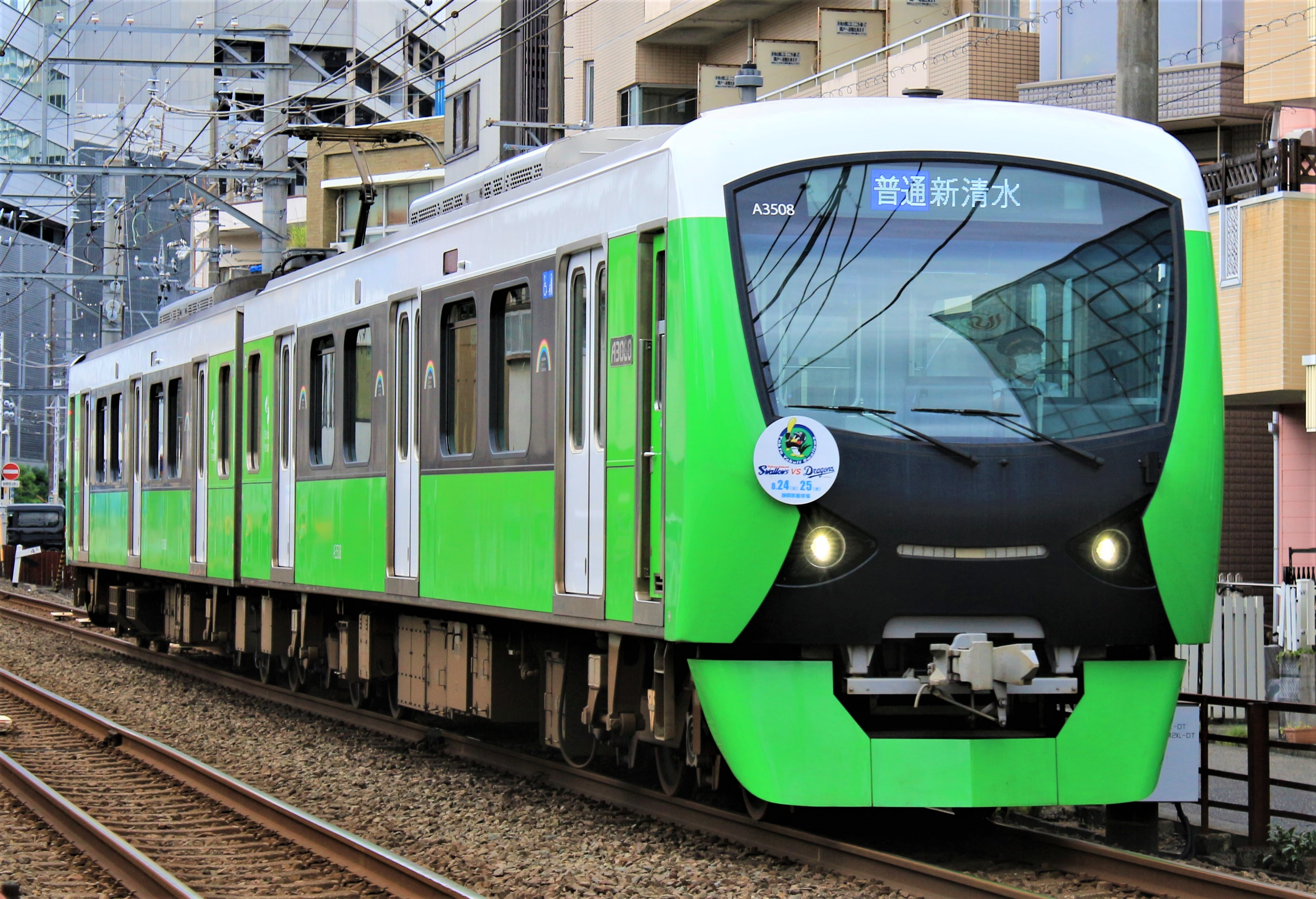
"Fresh Green" liveried set A3008 in August 2021
