= Naganuma Station =

Naganuma Station (長沼駅) is the name of two train stations located in Japan:

- Naganuma Station (Shizuoka)
- Naganuma Station (Tokyo)
