= University of Shizuoka Junior College =

Coordinates: 34.975°N 138.417°E

- 静岡県立大学短期大学部
- Type: Public junior college
- Established: 1951
- Location: Suruga-ku, Shizuoka, Japan
- Website: http://oshika.u-shizuoka-ken.ac.jp/

The University of Shizuoka Junior College (静岡県立大学短期大学部, Shizuoka Kenritsu Daigaku Tanki Daigakubu) is a public junior college affiliated with the University of Shizuoka and located in Suruga-ku, Shizuoka, Japan. It was founded in 1951 as a junior college exclusively for women, and became coeducational in 1987.

== Departments ==
- Department of Social Welfare
- Department of Dental Hygiene
- Department of Nursing
