= A3000 =

A3000 may refer to:

- A3000 road (Great Britain), a road connecting Turnham Green and Chiswick
- Acorn Archimedes 3000, a 1989 computer
- Commodore Amiga 3000, a 1990 computer
- Shizuoka Railway A3000 series EMU train
- Sony NW-A3000, a Walkman digital audio player
