= Higashi-Shizuoka Station =

Railway station in Shizuoka, Japan

CA16 Higashi-Shizuoka Station 東静岡駅
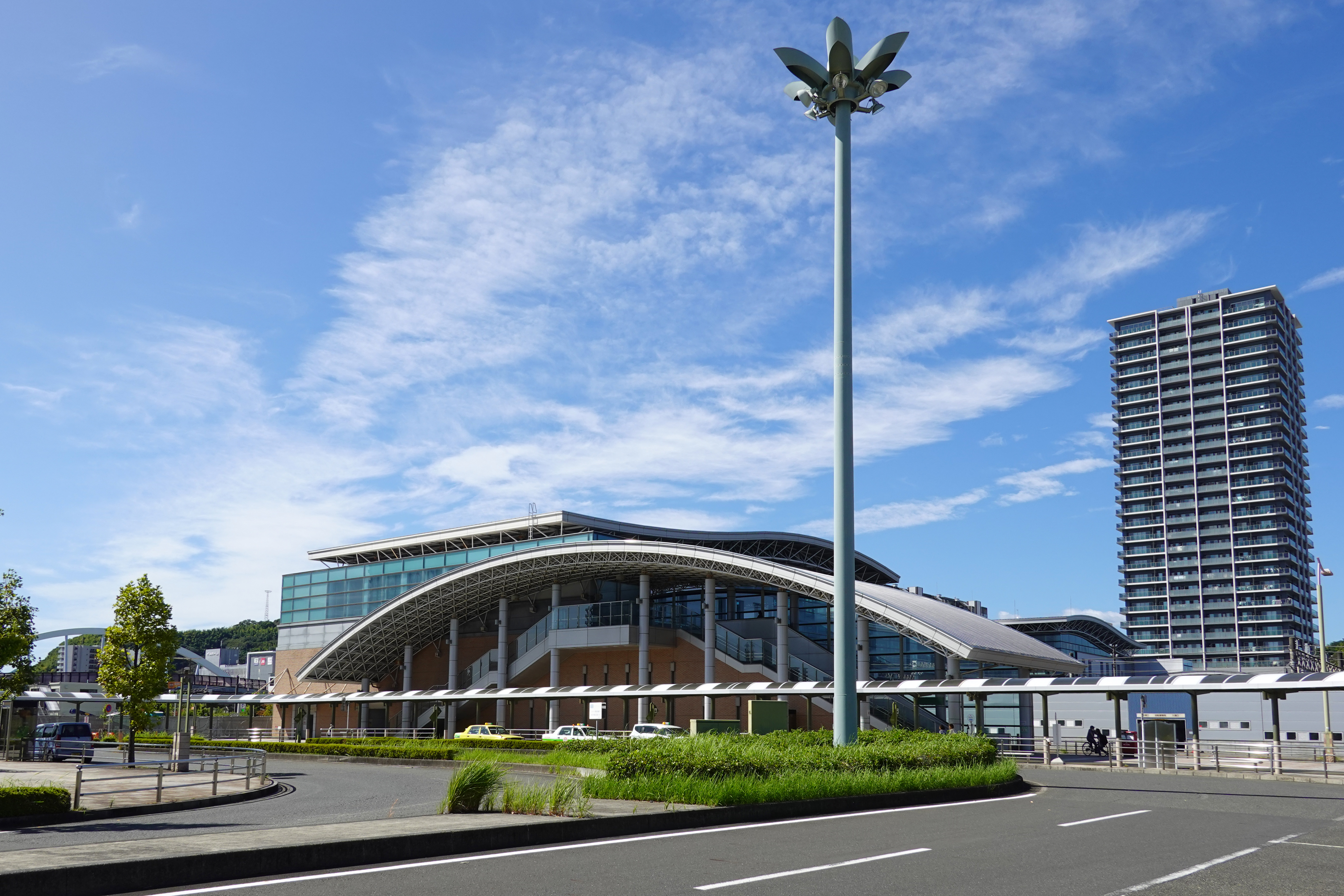
- JR Higashi-Shizuoka Station in 2023

General information
- Location: Naganuma, Aoi-ku, Shizuoka-shi, Shizuoka-ken; Japan
- Coordinates: 34°59′7″N 138°24′47″E
- Operator: JR Central
- Line: Tokaido Main Line
- Distance: 177.7 kilometers from Tokyo
- Platforms: 2 side platforms
- Tracks: 2

Construction
- Structure type: Ground level
- Accessible: Yes

Other information
- Status: Staffed
- Station code: CA16
- Website: Official website

History
- Opened: October 30, 1998

Passengers
- FY2017: 8,361 daily
Location
- Location within Shizuoka Prefecture Location within Japan

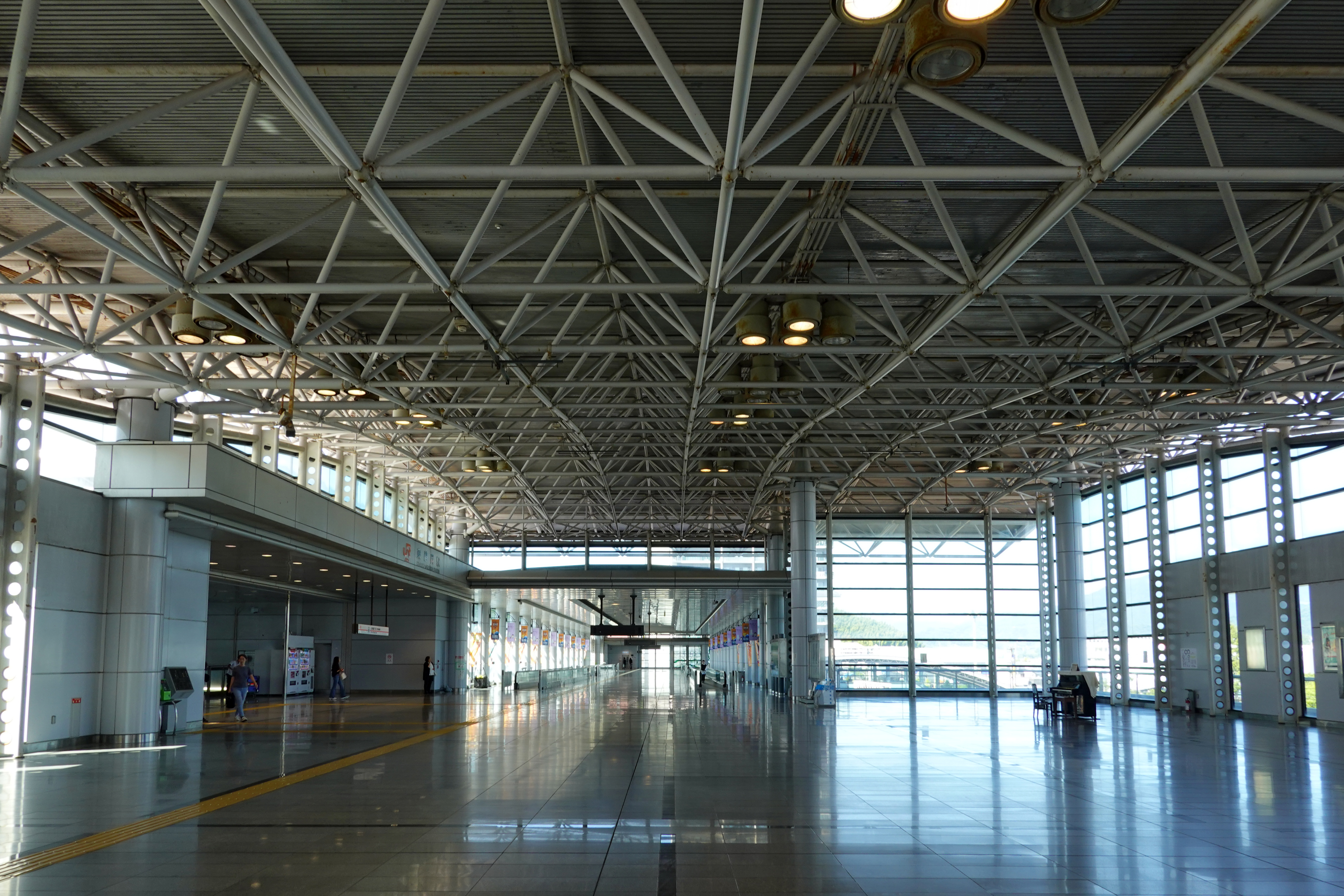
Interior

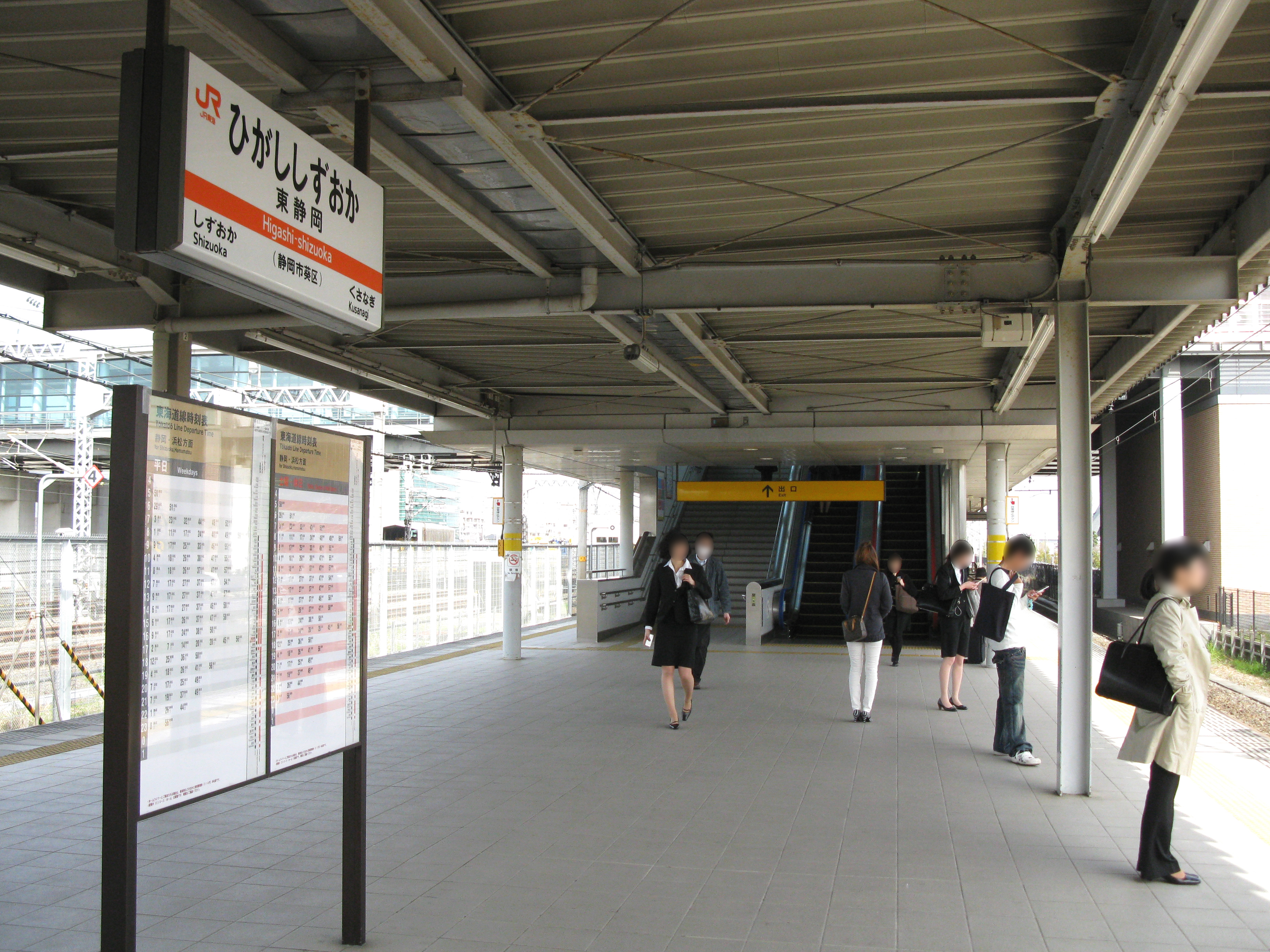
Platform

Higashi-Shizuoka Station (東静岡駅, Higashi-Shizuoka-eki) is a railway station on the Tōkaidō Main Line in Aoi-ku, Shizuoka, Shizuoka City, Shizuoka Prefecture, Japan, operated by Central Japan Railway Company (JR Tōkai).

== Lines ==
Higashi-Shizuoka Station is served by the Tōkaidō Main Line, and is located 177.7 kilometers from the starting point of the line at Tokyo Station.

== Station layout ==
The station has a single island platform serving two tracks, connected to the station building by a footbridge with a moving walkway. The station building has automated ticket machines, TOICA automated turnstiles, and a staffed ticket office.

=== Platforms ===
1	■ Tōkaidō Main Line	for Numazu and Atami
2	■ Tōkaidō Main Line	for Shizuoka and Hamamatsu

== Adjacent stations ==
«	Service	»
Tōkaidō Main Line
Rapid: Does not stop at this station
Limited Express Fujikawa: Does not stop at this station
Sleeper Limited Express Sunrise Seto: Does not stop at this station
Sleeper Limited Express Sunrise Izumo: Does not stop at this station
Kusanagi	Local	Shizuoka

== History ==
Higashi-Shizuoka Station opened on 30 October 1998 as part of an urban renewal redevelopment of a portion of the former Higashi-Shizuoka Freight Terminal. A large-scale convention center next to the train station opened in 1999. These developments were intended to encourage further investment towards the east of Shizuoka city center. Development of the area since the opening of the station has included a number of apartment blocks, a large shopping center, and an onsen.

Station numbering was introduced to the section of the Tōkaidō Line operated JR Central in March 2018; Higashi-Shizuoka Station was assigned station number CA16.

== Passenger statistics ==
In fiscal 2019, the station was used by an average of 8,400 passengers daily (boarding passengers only).

== Surrounding area ==
- Naganuma Station (Shizuoka)
- Shizuoka University
- Kusanagi Athletic Stadium

== See also ==
- List of railway stations in Japan
