= Shin-Shizuoka Station =

Railway station in Shizuoka, Japan

Shin-Shizuoka Station 新静岡駅
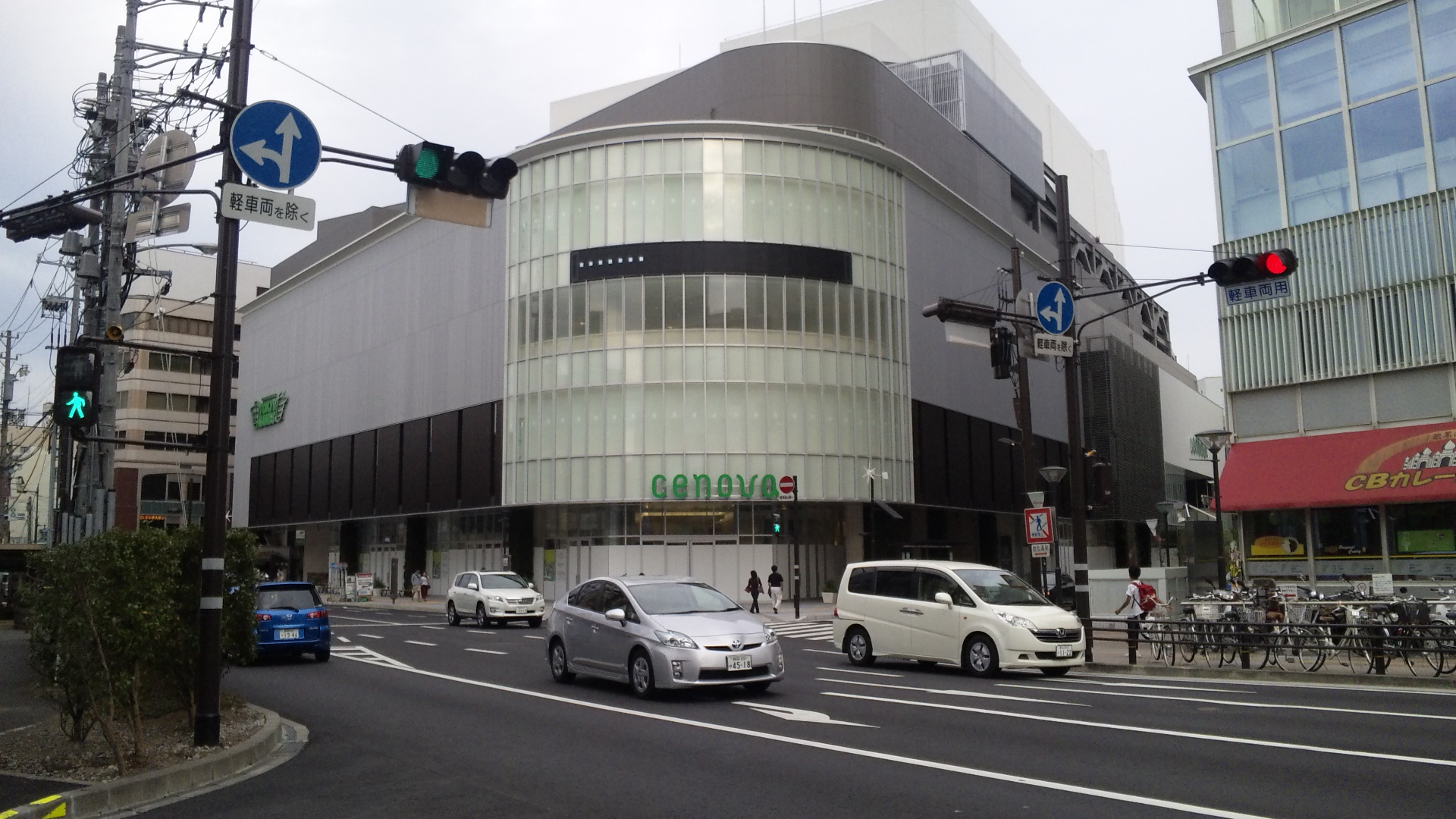
- Shin-Shizuoka Center

General information
- Location: 1-1-1 Takajō, Aoi-ku, Shizuoka-shi, Shizuoka-ken; Japan
- Coordinates: 34.975813°N 138.387421°E
- Operator: Shizuoka Railway
- Line: ■ Shizuoka–Shimizu Line
- Distance: 13.3 km from Shin-Shimizu
- Platforms: 2 island platforms

Other information
- Status: Staffed
- Station code: S01

History
- Opened: December 9, 1908
- Former names: Takajōmachi (to 1954)

Passengers
- FY2017: 9,768 (daily)

Services
Preceding station	Shizuoka Railway	Following station
Terminus	Shizuoka–Shimizu Line Express	Pref. Sports Park towards Shin-Shimizu
Terminus	Shizuoka–Shimizu Line Local	Hiyoshichō towards Shin-Shimizu
Location
- Location within Shizuoka Prefecture Location within Japan

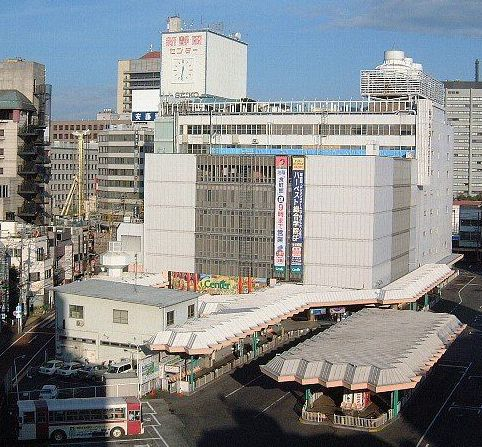
former station building

Shin-Shizuoka Station (新静岡駅, Shin-Shizuoka-eki) is a railway station in Aoi-ku, Shizuoka, Shizuoka Prefecture, Japan, operated by the private railway company, Shizuoka Railway (Shizutetsu). It is located within the Shin-Shizuoka Cenova shopping complex.

== Lines ==
Shin-Shizuoka Station is a terminal station of the Shizuoka–Shimizu Line and is 11.0 kilometers from the opposing terminus of the line at Shin-Shimizu Station.

== Station layout ==
The station has two island platforms serving three tracks. The station building has automated ticket machines, and automated turnstiles, which accept the LuLuCa smart card ticketing system as well as the PiTaPa and ICOCA IC cards. The station is staffed.

== History ==
Shin-Shizuoka Station was opened on December 9, 1908 as Takajōmachi Station (鷹匠町駅, Takajōmachi-eki). It was renamed "Shin-Shizuoka" on October 1, 1954. Shizuoka's city tram system was discontinued in September 1962, and a large bus terminal was established at Shin-Shizuoka Station on May 10, 1966. The Shin-Shizuoka Center department store above the station was opened on May 15, 1966. This was closed and demolished at the end of January 2009, and a new, larger shopping complex called Cenova opened October 5, 2011.

== Passenger statistics ==
In fiscal 2017, the station was used by an average of 9,768 passengers daily (boarding passengers only).

== Surrounding area ==
- Shizuoka Station
- Shizuoka Prefectural Offices
- Shizuoka City Hall
- site of Sunpu Castle

== See also ==
- List of railway stations in Japan
