= Shin-Shimizu Station =

Railway station in Shizuoka, Japan

Shin-Shimizu Station 新清水駅
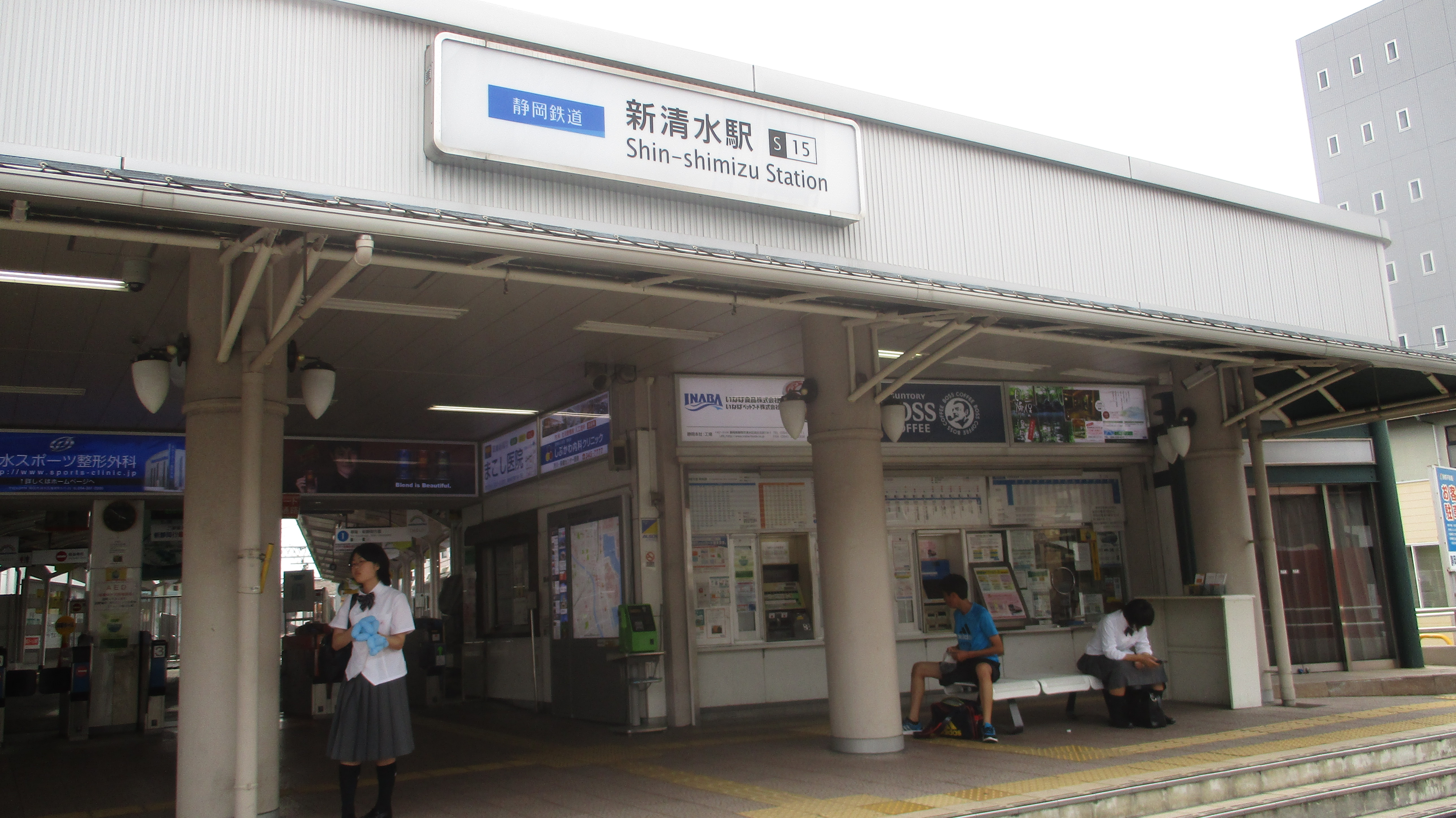
- The main entrance (June 2016)

General information
- Location: Aioi-chō 2-28, Shimizu-ku, Shizuoka-shi, Shizuoka-ken; Japan
- Coordinates: 35°1′1.37″N 138°29′15.93″E
- Operator: Shizuoka Railway
- Line: ■ Shizuoka–Shimizu Line
- Distance: 11.0 km from Shin-Shizuoka
- Platforms: 2 bay platforms

Other information
- Station code: S15

History
- Opened: May 8, 1908.
- Former names: Tsujimura (to 1918); Ejiri Shindo (to 1933); Shimizu Aioi-cho (to 1954)

Passengers
- FY2017: 3039 (daily)

Services
Preceding station	Shizuoka Railway	Following station
Sakurabashi towards Shin-Shizuoka	Shizuoka–Shimizu Line Commuter Express	Terminus
Sakurabashi One-way operation	Shizuoka–Shimizu Line Express	Terminus
Irieoka towards Shin-Shizuoka	Shizuoka–Shimizu Line Local	Terminus
Location
- Location within Shizuoka Prefecture Location within Japan

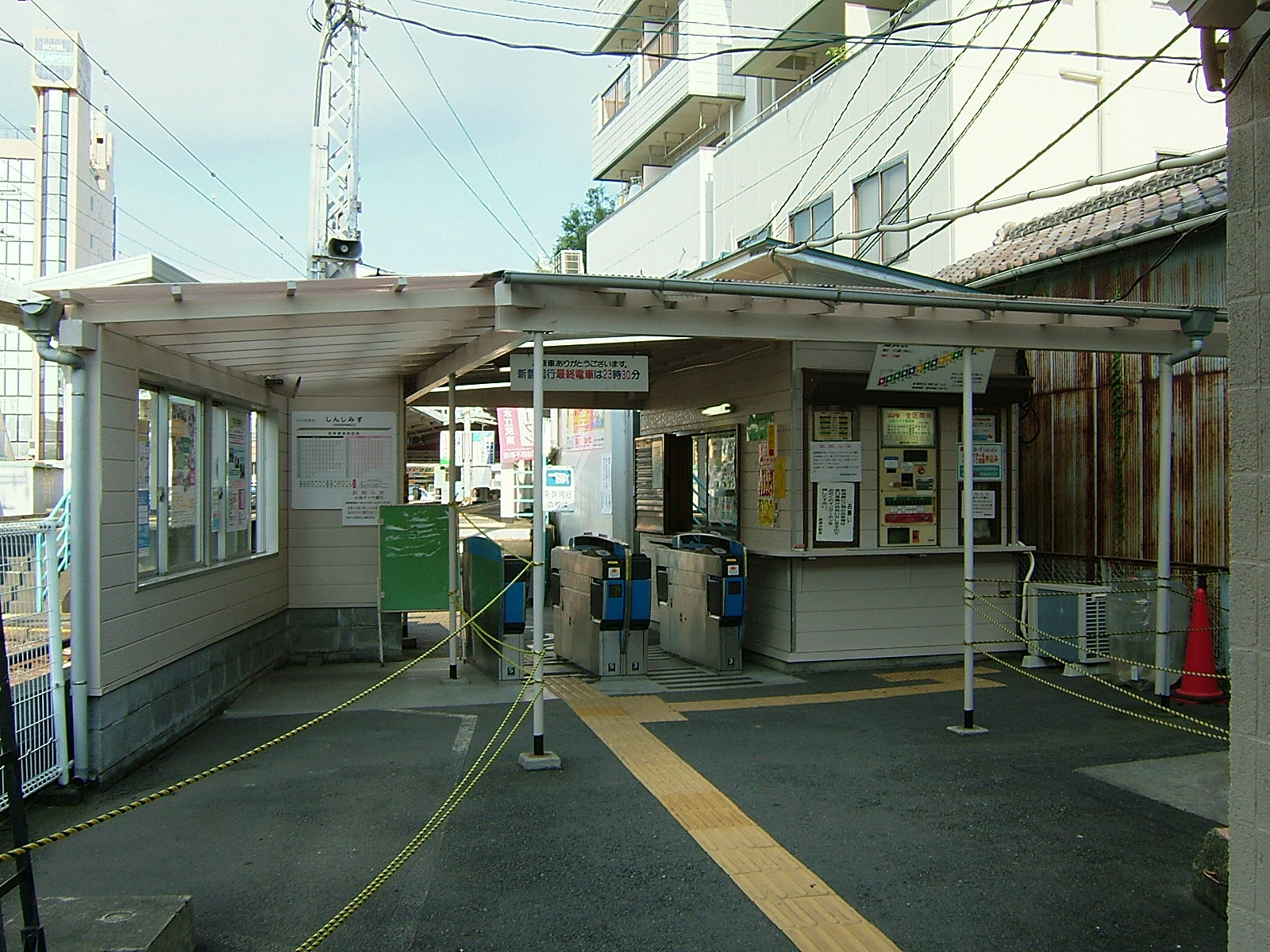
The west entrance (June 2016)

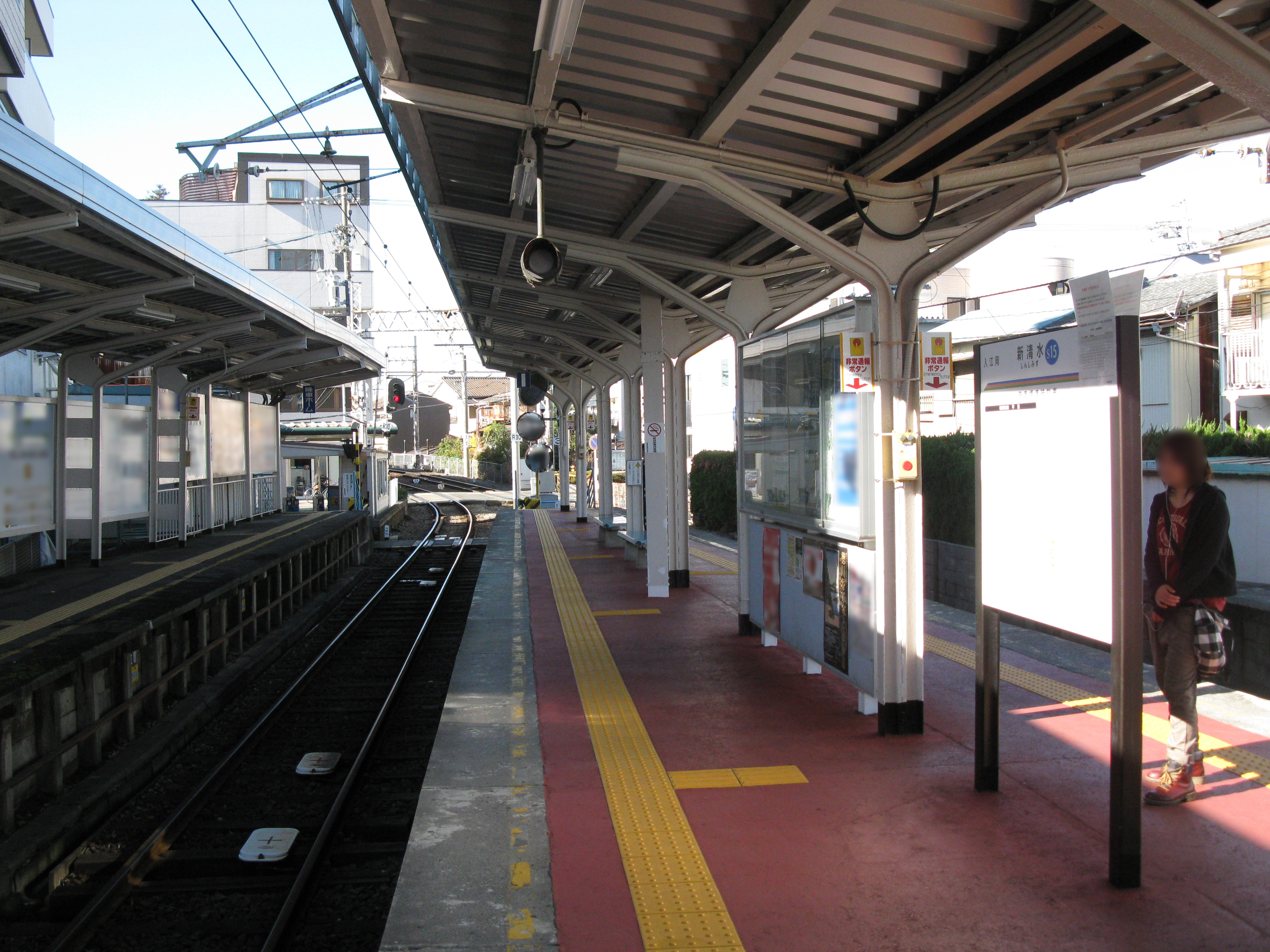
Platforms in 2010

Shin-Shimizu Station (新清水駅, Shin-Shimizu-eki) is a railway station in Suruga-ku, Shizuoka, Shizuoka Prefecture, Japan, operated by the private railway company, Shizuoka Railway (Shizutetsu).

== Lines ==
Shin-Shimizu Station is a terminal station on the Shizuoka–Shimizu Line and is 11.0 kilometers from the opposing terminus of the line at Shin-Shizuoka Station.

== Station layout ==
The station has a double bay platform. The station consists of two entrances on the east and west sides of the station. The main station building is located on the east side of the station. Both entrances have automated ticket machines, and automated turnstiles.

=== Platforms ===
1	■ Shizuoka–Shimizu Line	For Shin-Shizuoka
2	■ Shizuoka–Shimizu Line	For Shin-Shizuoka

== Station history ==
Shin-Shimizu Station was established on May 8, 1908, as Tsujimura Station (辻村駅). It was renamed Ejiri Shindo Station (江尻新道駅) in 1918, and Shimizu Aioi-cho Station in 1933. It was renamed to its present name on October 1, 1954.

== Passenger statistics ==
In fiscal 2017, the station was used by an average of 3039 passengers daily (boarding passengers only).

== Surrounding area ==
- former Shimizu City Hall
- Shimizu Station

== See also ==
- List of railway stations in Japan
