= Suruga-ku =

Suruga 駿河区
- Ward
- Suruga Ward
- /0/queryThe property query is required; /0/idsThe property ids is required; /0Failed to match at least one schema; /0/titleThe property title is required; /0/serviceDoes not have a value in the enumeration ["page"]; /0Failed to match exactly one schema; /0/geometriesThe property geometries is required; /0/typeDoes not have a value in the enumeration ["GeometryCollection"]; /0/typeDoes not have a value in the enumeration ["MultiPolygon"]; /0/typeDoes not have a value in the enumeration ["Point"]; /0/typeDoes not have a value in the enumeration ["MultiPoint"]; /0/typeDoes not have a value in the enumeration ["LineString"]; /0/typeDoes not have a value in the enumeration ["MultiLineString"]; /0/typeDoes not have a value in the enumeration ["Polygon"]; /0/coordinatesThe property coordinates is required; /0/geometryThe property geometry is required; /0/typeDoes not have a value in the enumeration ["Feature"]; /0/featuresThe property features is required; /0/typeDoes not have a value in the enumeration ["FeatureCollection"]
- Location of Suruga-ku in Shizuoka

- Coordinates: 34°57′38″N 138°24′15″E
- Country: Japan
- Region: Tōkai (Chūbu)
- Prefecture: Shizuoka
- City: Shizuoka

Area
  - Total: 73.06 km^{2} (28.21 sq mi)

Population (December 1, 2019)
  - Total: 210,684
  - Density: 2,884/km^{2} (7,469/sq mi)
- Time zone: UTC+9 (Japan Standard Time)
- Phone number: 054-202-5811
- Address: 10-40 Minami-Yawata-cho, Suruga-ku Shizuoka-shi, Shizuoka-ken 422-8550
- Website: Suruga-ku home page

Suruga-ku (駿河区, Suruga-ku) is one of three wards of Shizuoka, Shizuoka, Japan, located in the southern part of the city. The north east of Suruga-ku faces Aoi-ku; the north west faces Shimizu-ku; the south west faces Yaizu city and the south east faces Suruga Bay.

== History ==
Suruga-ku was created on April 1, 2005 when Shizuoka became a city designated by government ordinance (a "designated city"). It consists of the area of Shizuoka prior to its merger with Shimizu, south of the Tōkaidō Main Line rail tracks.

== Population ==
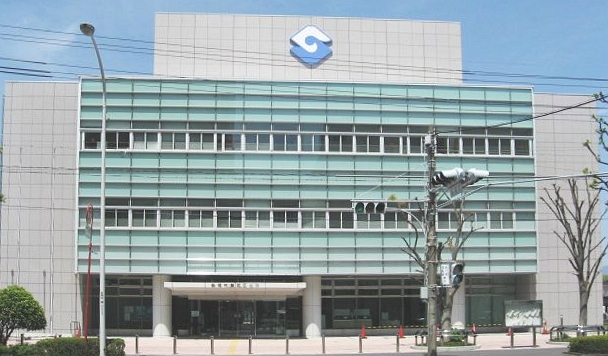
Suruga Ward Office

As of 1 December 2019, Suruga-ku had a population of 210,684, with a land area of 73.06 km^{2} and a population density of 2,884 persons per km^{2}.

== Education ==
It has a North Korean school, Shizuoka Korean Elementary and Junior High School (静岡朝鮮初中級学校).
