= LuLuCa =

Contactless smart card system in Shizuoka, Japan

LuLuCa PASAR+POINT card

LuLuCa (ルルカ) is a rechargeable contactless smart card ticketing system for public transport in Shizuoka, Japan, introduced by Shizuoka Railway (Shizutetsu) beginning in March 2006. The card is also referred to as SHIZUTETSU CARD LuLuCa and LuLuCa PASAR Card. Just like JR East's Suica or JR West's ICOCA, the card uses RFID technology developed by Sony corporation known as FeliCa.

A "LuLuCa+PiTaPa" card variant also exists, which allows for added PiTaPa functionality and for the card to be used across Japan due to PiTaPa's mutual operability across the country's public transit systems beginning in 2013. Prior to this, ICOCA and PiTaPa cards had been usable on Shizutetsu trains since 2007.

== Usable area ==
- Shizutetsu Justline; all the buses in Karase, Oshika, Torisaka, Mariko and Nishikubo.
- Shizuoka Railway; Shizuoka Shimizu Line.
- Other facilities of Shizutetsu group, including Shinshizuoka-Center and Shizutetsu Store grocery stores.

== Types of cards ==
- LuLuCa POINT: A simple loyalty card of Shizutetsu Stores; not a smart card
- LuLuCa PASAR+POINT: A smart card for public transport, also with the above function
  - All day adult card
  - Special discount card: For handicapped customers only
  - Child's card: For elementary school students or younger
  - Student's card: For junior high school students or older
- LuLuCa+: Supports above functionality along with a credit card functionality by The Shizuoka Bank
- LuLuCa+PiTaPa: Card with added PiTaPa functionality, also with all the above functions
