= Aoi-ku =

Aoi 葵区
- Ward
- Aoi Ward
- Interactive map of Aoi
- Aoi (Japan)
- Coordinates: 34°58′30″N 138°23′1″E
- Country: Japan
- Region: Tōkai Koshin'etsu region (Chūbu)
- Prefecture: Shizuoka
- City: Shizuoka

Area
  - Total: 1,411.90 km^{2} (545.14 sq mi)

Population (January 10, 2020)
  - Total: 249,451
  - Density: 176.678/km^{2} (457.593/sq mi)
- Time zone: UTC+9 (Japan Standard Time)
- Phone number: 054-254-2115
- Address: 5-1 Otemachi, Aoi-ku Shizuoka-shi, Shizuoka-ken 420-8602
- Climate: Cfa
- Website: Aoi-ku home page

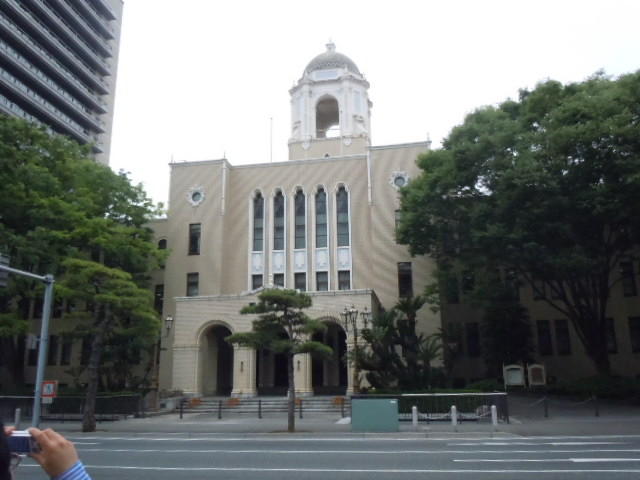
Aoi Ward Office

Aoi-ku (葵区, Aoi-ku) is one of three wards of the city of Shizuoka in Shizuoka Prefecture, Japan, located in the northern part of the city. Aoi-ku borders Suruga-ku in the south and Shimizu-ku to the southeast; the west faces Shimada, Fujieda and Kawanehon and its northern tip extends into the border between Nagano Prefecture and Yamanashi Prefecture. It is the largest ward in Japan in terms of geographic area.

Aoi-ku was created on April 1, 2003, when Shizuoka became a city designated by government ordinance (a "designated city"). It consists of the area of Shizuoka prior to its merger with Shimizu, north of the Tōkaidō Main Line rail tracks.

The ward is home to both the Shizuoka city offices as well as the Shizuoka prefectural offices.

== Geography ==
=== Climate ===
Aoi-ku has a climate characterized by hot and humid summers, and relatively mild winters (Köppen climate classification Cfa). The average annual temperature in Aoi-ku is 11.6 °C (52.9 °F). The average annual rainfall is 3,258.6 mm (128.29 in) with September as the wettest month. The temperatures are highest on average in August, at around 22.4 °C (72.3 °F), and lowest in January, at around 1.2 °C (34.2 °F).

Climate data for Aoi-ku (1991−2020 normals, extremes 1978−present)
Month	Jan	Feb	Mar	Apr	May	Jun	Jul	Aug	Sep	Oct	Nov	Dec	Year
Record high °C (°F)	18.2 (64.8)	21.8 (71.2)	24.2 (75.6)	27.5 (81.5)	29.9 (85.8)	34.4 (93.9)	35.7 (96.3)	34.7 (94.5)	33.2 (91.8)	28.4 (83.1)	22.4 (72.3)	19.4 (66.9)	35.7 (96.3)
Mean daily maximum °C (°F)	6.6 (43.9)	7.8 (46.0)	11.0 (51.8)	16.1 (61.0)	20.5 (68.9)	23.1 (73.6)	27.0 (80.6)	28.0 (82.4)	24.4 (75.9)	19.2 (66.6)	14.2 (57.6)	9.1 (48.4)	17.2 (63.1)
Daily mean °C (°F)	1.2 (34.2)	1.9 (35.4)	5.1 (41.2)	10.0 (50.0)	14.4 (57.9)	17.9 (64.2)	21.7 (71.1)	22.4 (72.3)	19.2 (66.6)	13.8 (56.8)	8.4 (47.1)	3.5 (38.3)	11.6 (52.9)
Mean daily minimum °C (°F)	−3.0 (26.6)	−2.7 (27.1)	0.2 (32.4)	4.9 (40.8)	9.5 (49.1)	14.0 (57.2)	18.0 (64.4)	18.7 (65.7)	15.5 (59.9)	9.8 (49.6)	4.0 (39.2)	−0.8 (30.6)	7.3 (45.2)
Record low °C (°F)	−11.5 (11.3)	−11.4 (11.5)	−8.6 (16.5)	−3.9 (25.0)	0.5 (32.9)	5.9 (42.6)	11.7 (53.1)	11.7 (53.1)	5.2 (41.4)	0.0 (32.0)	−3.5 (25.7)	−9.5 (14.9)	−11.5 (11.3)
Average precipitation mm (inches)	108.6 (4.28)	133.3 (5.25)	253.0 (9.96)	263.7 (10.38)	276.3 (10.88)	344.0 (13.54)	442.1 (17.41)	318.9 (12.56)	507.4 (19.98)	322.7 (12.70)	183.6 (7.23)	111.2 (4.38)	3,258.6 (128.29)
Average precipitation days (≥ 1.0 mm)	6.3	7.3	11.0	11.5	12.4	14.6	15.0	13.3	13.8	11.7	8.4	6.7	132
Mean monthly sunshine hours	206.3	184.4	177.4	177.3	176.9	122.3	142.4	160.9	127.1	147.1	173.1	204.0	1,995.3
Source: Japan Meteorological Agency

== Economy ==
Vic Tokai has its headquarters in Aoi-ku. Fuji Dream Airlines was headquartered in Aoi-ku; it now has its headquarters in Makinohara.

== Notes ==
- Geographic data related to Aoi-ku at OpenStreetMap
