= Shizuoka Railway =

Railway company in Shizuoka Prefecture, Japan

Shizuoka Railway Co., Ltd.
- Trade name: Shizutetsu
- Native name: 静岡鉄道株式会社
- Romanized name: Shizuoka Tetsudō kabushiki gaisha
- Type: Private (kabushiki gaisha)
- Industry: Private railroad
- Founded: May 1, 1919
- Headquarters: Aoi-ku, Shizuoka, Japan
- Key people: Tomohisa Imada (President)
- Revenue: JPY 18 billion
- Owner: Tokyu Corporation (3.86%)
- Number of employees: 347 (March 31, 2015)
- Subsidiaries: Shizutetsu Justline
- Website: group.shizutetsu.co.jp

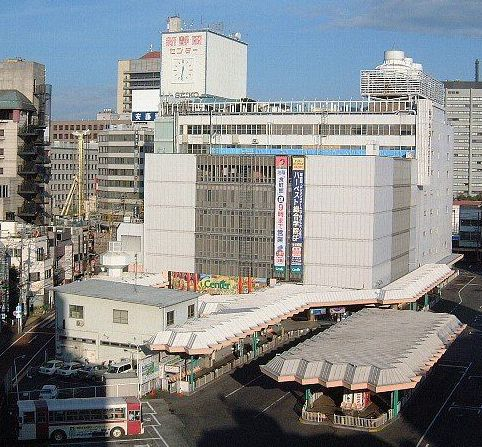
Shin-Shizuoka Station, built with Shinshizuoka-Center Department Store, a part of Shizutetsu Group

The Shizuoka Railway Company, Ltd. (静岡鉄道株式会社, Shizuoka Tetsudō kabushiki gaisha), also known as "Shizutetsu", is a private railway in Shizuoka Prefecture, Japan, and is majority owned by Tokyu Corporation. In addition to its railway business, the Shizuoka Railway Company owns large bus and taxi services, a department store, supermarkets, a construction company and real estate holdings.

== History ==
The first Shizuoka Railway Company was founded in 1906. It was initially built to connect downtown Shizuoka with Shimizu Port, to facilitate the export of green tea, the major agricultural product of Shizuoka prefecture at the time. It became the Shizuoka branch of Dai-Nippon Kidō (大日本軌道), a privately held narrow-gauge railway operator with operations in many locations around Japan in 1908. The line was electrified in 1919 and became standard-gauge in 1920. In 1923, the Shizuoka branch became independent as the Shizuoka Electric Railway Company (静岡電気鉄道, Shizuoka Denki Tetsudō). In 1943, the company was nationalized by the central government, and was merged with smaller railroad operations around Shizuoka Prefecture, under the new name of Shizuoka Railway. Its first chairman was Keita Gotō, founder of the Tokyu Corporation, which emerged as Shizuoka Railway’s primary shareholder after the end of World War II. Most of the rolling stock used by the Shizuoka Railway is used equipment purchased from the Tokyu Corporation.

== Lines ==
The company operates the Shizuoka–Shimizu Line, which runs for 11 kilometres (6.8 mi) from Shin-Shizuoka Station to Shin-Shimizu Station with 13 intermediate stations, and the Nihondaira Ropeway. Its highway bus system was spun off to a subsidiary company, Shizutetsu Justline, in 2002.

Former tram lines operated by the company include:

- Shizuoka City Line (静岡市内線, Shizuoka shinai-sen), 1922–1962
- Shimizu City Line (清水市内線, Shimizu shinai-sen), 1928–1975
- Sun-en Line (駿遠線, Sun-en-sen), 1911-1970
- Akiba Line (秋葉線, Akiba-sen), 1902–1962
