= Shimizu-ku =

Shimizu 清水区
- Ward
- Shimizu Ward
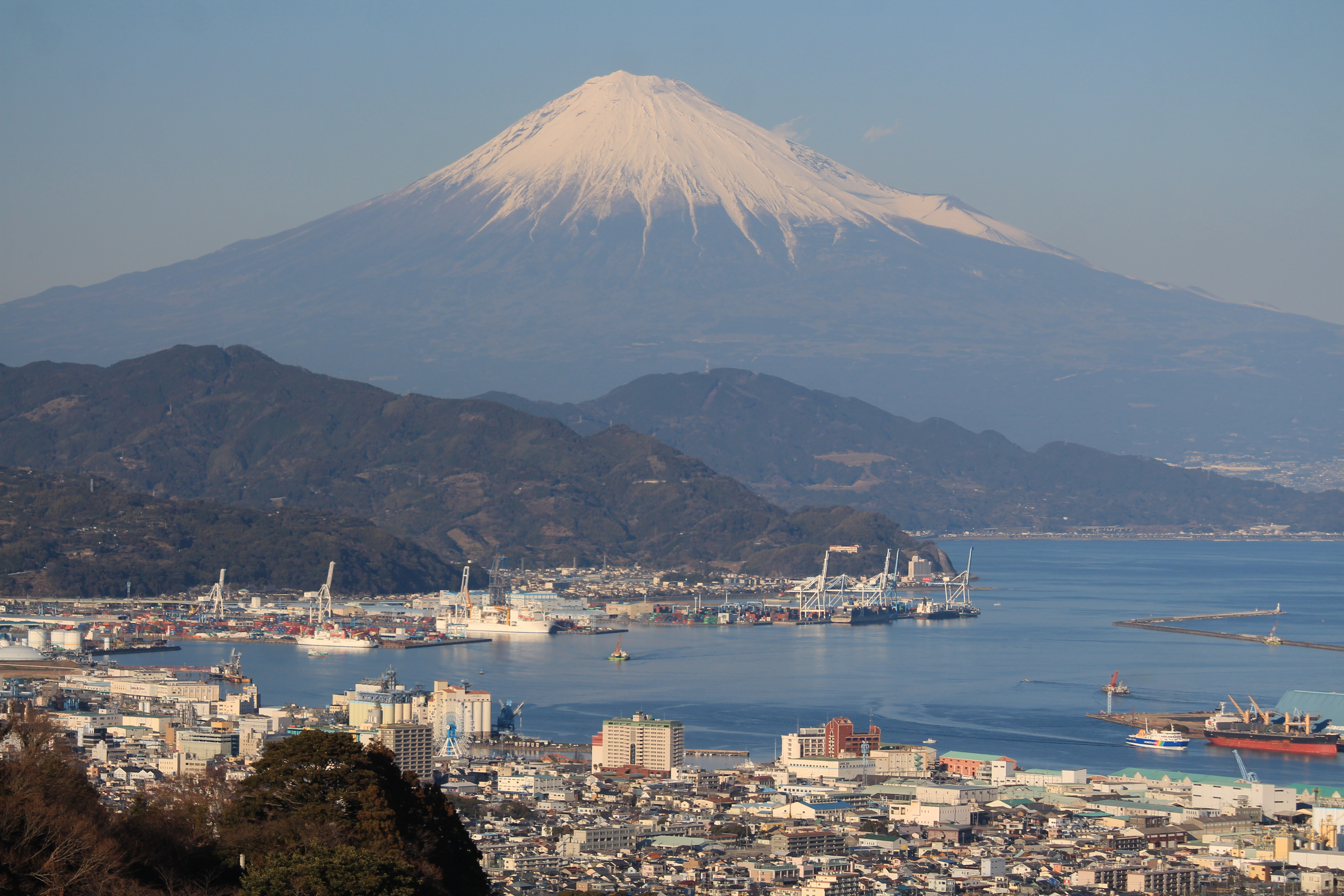
- Port of Shimizu and Mount Fuji from Nihondaira

- Flag Seal
- /0/queryThe property query is required; /0/idsThe property ids is required; /0Failed to match at least one schema; /0/titleThe property title is required; /0/serviceDoes not have a value in the enumeration ["page"]; /0Failed to match exactly one schema; /0/geometriesThe property geometries is required; /0/typeDoes not have a value in the enumeration ["GeometryCollection"]; /0/typeDoes not have a value in the enumeration ["MultiPolygon"]; /0/typeDoes not have a value in the enumeration ["Point"]; /0/typeDoes not have a value in the enumeration ["MultiPoint"]; /0/typeDoes not have a value in the enumeration ["LineString"]; /0/typeDoes not have a value in the enumeration ["MultiLineString"]; /0/typeDoes not have a value in the enumeration ["Polygon"]; /0/coordinatesThe property coordinates is required; /0/geometryThe property geometry is required; /0/typeDoes not have a value in the enumeration ["Feature"]; /0/featuresThe property features is required; /0/typeDoes not have a value in the enumeration ["FeatureCollection"]
- Location of Shimizu-ku in Shizuoka

- Coordinates: 35°0′57″N 138°29′23″E
- Country: Japan
- Region: Chūbu
- Prefecture: Shizuoka
- City: Shizuoka

Area
  - Total: 265.09 km^{2} (102.35 sq mi)

Population (December 1, 2019)
  - Total: 231,233
  - Density: 872.28/km^{2} (2,259.2/sq mi)
- Time zone: UTC+9 (Japan Standard Time)
- Phone number: 054-354-2111
- Address: 6-8 Asahi-cho; 424-8701
- Climate: Cfa
- Website: Shimizu-ku home page

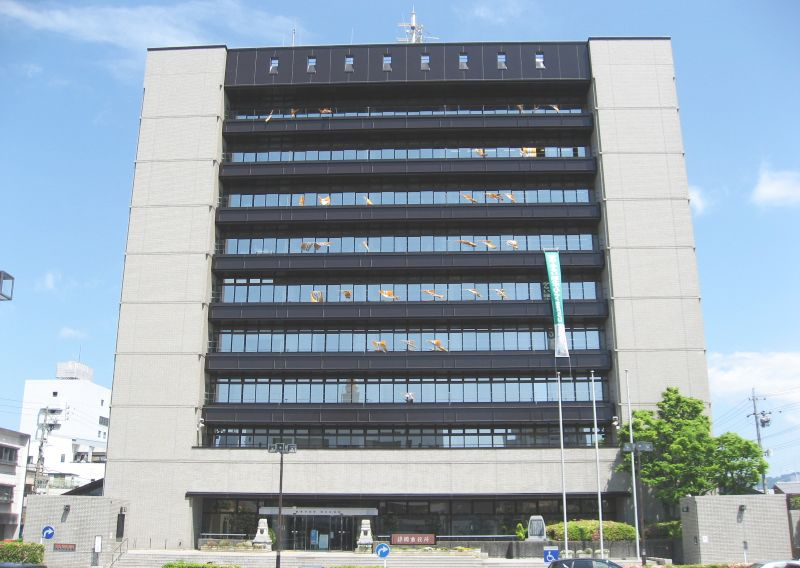
Shimizu-ku Ward Office

Shimizu-ku (清水区, Shimizu-ku) is the easternmost of the three wards of the city of Shizuoka in Shizuoka Prefecture, Japan.

== History ==
Shimizu-ku was created on April 1, 2005, when Shizuoka became a city designated by government ordinance (a "designated city"). Its area is almost identical to former Shimizu city, which merged with Shizuoka city on April 1, 2003. Shizuoka annexed the town of Kanbara from Ihara District on March 31, 2006, and the town of Yui on November 1, 2008, adding these former municipalities to Shimizu-ku.

Since ancient times, Shimizu thrived as a harbor town due to its good natural harbor. In addition, five post stations of Tōkaidō were located in Shimizu: (Kanbara-juku, Okitsu-juku, Ejiri-juku, and Yui-shuku, all of which brought prosperity to the area during the Edo period. After the Meiji Restoration, an Imperial decree in July 1899 established Shimizu as an open port for trading with the United States and the United Kingdom. Shimizu became an international trade port for the export of green tea, as well as housing a major fishery and affiliated industries.

A Japanese manga, Chibi Maruko-chan put Shimizu on the national map. This manga is written by Momoko Sakura, a native of Shimizu. Shimizu is also noted for its enthusiasm with soccer, with the local J.League professional club Shimizu S-Pulse having a strong support base.

== Geography ==
Shimizu is located on the coast of Suruga Bay of the Pacific Ocean and covers a wide area from a coastal plain to the hills. The view of Mount Fuji at Shimizu as seen across the bay from the Miho no Matsubara appears in many pictures and paintings.

=== Neighboring municipalities ===
Shizuoka Prefecture

- Fuji
- Fujinomiya
- Suruga-ku, Shizuoka city
- Aoi-ku, Shizuoka city

Yamanashi Prefecture

- Nambu

=== Climate ===
The city has a climate characterized by hot and humid summers, and relatively mild winters (Köppen climate classification Cfa). The average annual temperature in Matsuzaki is 16.7 °C (62.1 °F). The average annual rainfall is 2,380.6 mm (93.72 in) with July as the wettest month. The temperatures are highest on average in August, at around 27.1 °C (80.8 °F), and lowest in January, at around 6.7 °C (44.1 °F).

Climate data for Shimizu-ku (1991−2020 normals, extremes 1978−present)
Month	Jan	Feb	Mar	Apr	May	Jun	Jul	Aug	Sep	Oct	Nov	Dec	Year
Record high °C (°F)	22.3 (72.1)	26.8 (80.2)	27.4 (81.3)	31.8 (89.2)	34.3 (93.7)	37.8 (100.0)	38.2 (100.8)	37.8 (100.0)	37.3 (99.1)	34.3 (93.7)	26.9 (80.4)	24.3 (75.7)	38.2 (100.8)
Mean daily maximum °C (°F)	11.7 (53.1)	12.6 (54.7)	15.4 (59.7)	19.8 (67.6)	23.6 (74.5)	26.1 (79.0)	29.5 (85.1)	31.3 (88.3)	28.4 (83.1)	23.5 (74.3)	18.7 (65.7)	14.1 (57.4)	21.2 (70.2)
Daily mean °C (°F)	6.7 (44.1)	7.5 (45.5)	10.5 (50.9)	14.9 (58.8)	18.9 (66.0)	22.1 (71.8)	25.7 (78.3)	27.1 (80.8)	24.3 (75.7)	19.3 (66.7)	14.1 (57.4)	9.1 (48.4)	16.7 (62.0)
Mean daily minimum °C (°F)	2.5 (36.5)	3.1 (37.6)	6.0 (42.8)	10.5 (50.9)	14.9 (58.8)	19.0 (66.2)	22.8 (73.0)	24.0 (75.2)	21.0 (69.8)	15.7 (60.3)	10.3 (50.5)	5.0 (41.0)	12.9 (55.2)
Record low °C (°F)	−4.0 (24.8)	−5.6 (21.9)	−2.1 (28.2)	1.7 (35.1)	6.8 (44.2)	12.9 (55.2)	16.3 (61.3)	18.8 (65.8)	12.2 (54.0)	6.4 (43.5)	0.7 (33.3)	−3.0 (26.6)	−5.6 (21.9)
Average precipitation mm (inches)	81.8 (3.22)	106.4 (4.19)	209.4 (8.24)	218.2 (8.59)	211.8 (8.34)	264.7 (10.42)	292.5 (11.52)	196.2 (7.72)	278.8 (10.98)	262.4 (10.33)	147.1 (5.79)	83.0 (3.27)	2,380.6 (93.72)
Average precipitation days (≥ 1.0 mm)	5.6	6.2	10.3	10.1	10.8	13.1	11.9	9.7	11.8	10.4	7.8	5.6	113.3
Mean monthly sunshine hours	209.0	186.0	186.6	191.0	184.7	127.2	148.0	197.9	156.4	156.6	169.9	201.1	2,126.8
Source: Japan Meteorological Agency

== Economy ==
Shimizu was introduced in a Japanese school textbook of geography as a city with all three industries: agriculture, heavy industry and commerce.

=== Primary industry ===
Shimizu is known for producing Japanese mandarin oranges, and green tea in the mountainous area and around the Nihondaira. Shimizu Port is a major commercial fishing port. Production of roses used to be the highest in Japan.

=== Heavy industry ===
The waterfront area was formerly an industrial area and there were shipyards, iron works, and numerous canneries. Most of the heavy industry has been replaced by commercial venues.

=== Commerce ===
At Shimizu Station, the "Shimizu Ekimae Ginza" shopping area used to be the city center of Shimizu. However, there are no longer any department stores. The Seiyu that remained near the station closed in March 2015. Since many large suburban shopping centers have been expanding, the shopping area downtown is not as lively as it used to be. Lately, department stores like Nagasaki-ya, Marui, Seifu and Daiei have closed, one after the other. Moreover, since Shimizu merged with Shizuoka, a plan is being implemented to move fundamental functions to the area around Higashi-Shizuoka Station as the third central area of the city in addition to Shimizu and Shizuoka.

== Transport ==
=== Highway ===
- Tōmei Expressway
- Japan National Route 1
- Japan National Route 52
- Japan National Route 149
- Japan National Route 150

=== Rail ===
- JR Central - Tōkaidō Main Line
  - Shin-Kambara • Kambara • Yui • Okitsu • Shimizu • Kusanagi •
- Shizuoka Railway Shizuoka–Shimizu Line
  - Kenritsu Bijutsukanmae • Kusanagi • Mikadodai • Kitsunegasaki • Sakurabashi • Irieoka • Shin-Shimizu •

Until 1984, the Shimizukō Line ran 8 km into Miho in the heart of the Shimizu peninsula. Local bus services provide many routes throughout Shimizu-ku.

=== Sea Port ===
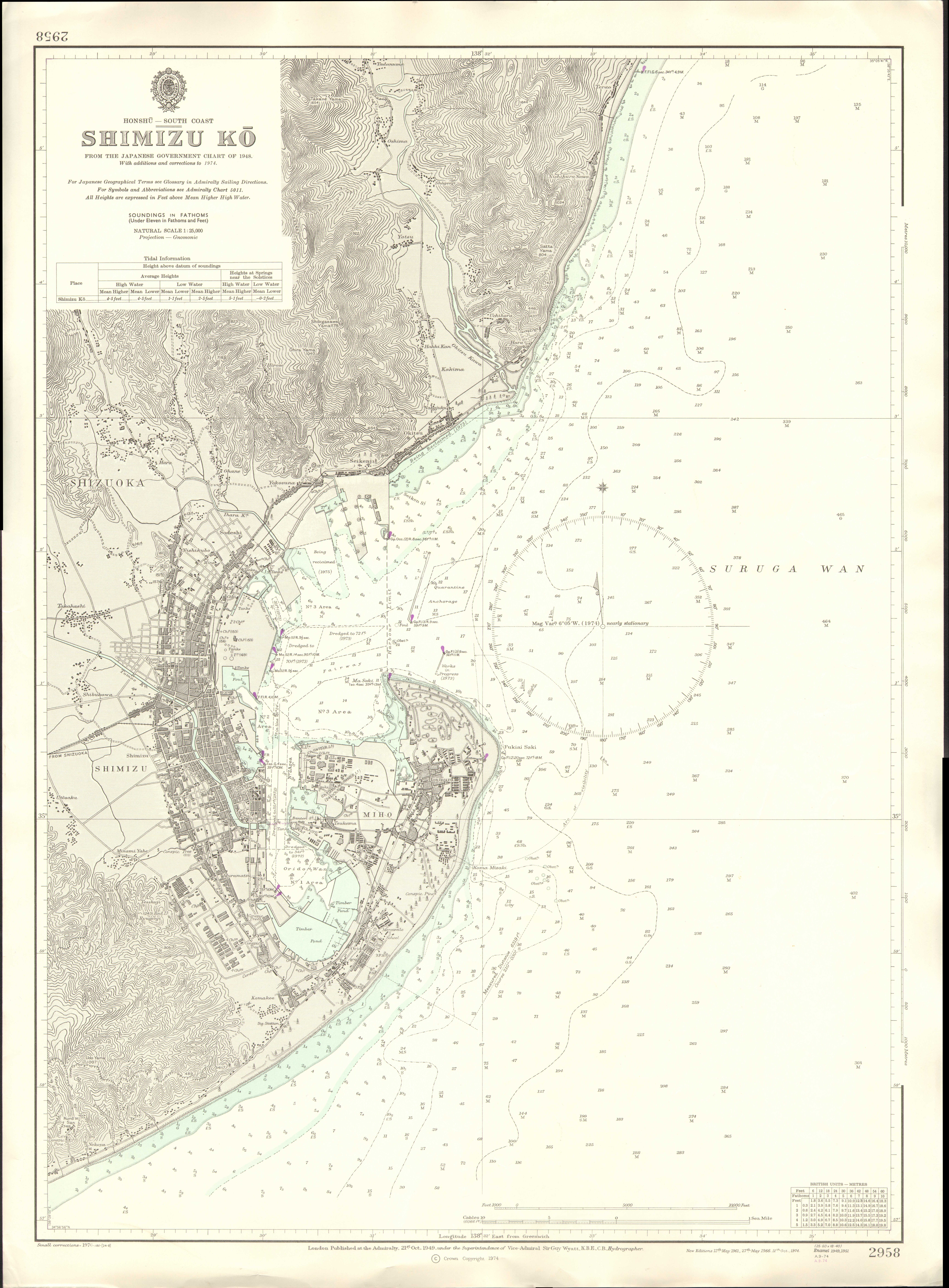
1974 Nautical chart of the Port of Shimizu

The Port of Shimizu is a long established mid-size sea port, catering to container ships, dry bulk ships and cruise ships, including the Celebrity Millennium.

It is well located, being in between the two major port areas of Japan, i.e. the Tokyo Bay ports of Tokyo, Kawasaki and Yokohama (Keihin ports) and the Osaka Bay ports of Osaka and Kobe (Hanshin ports. The Port of Shimizu has a water depth of about 12 meters; its attractiveness has been enhanced over the past years by the construction of new road and rail links which contribute to expanding its commercial hinterland.

In tonnage, imports (about 6.5 million tons) are close to twice export volumes, but in trade value exports are twice as valuable as imports.

The Port of Shimizu container traffic is about balanced, with over 250,000 TEU (Twenty Foot Equivalent Unit) in each direction, with auto parts and chemicals amongst the main cargo types. Major international container lines provide weekly services on major trade routes, including North America, Europe and Asia, with about 110 calls per months on 28 trade routes.

The port of Shimizu also includes a terminal to receive LNG tankers and store imported Liquefied natural gas; it is operated by Shimizu LNG, a subsidiary of Shizuoka Gas (Japan is the world's largest importer of LNG).

The Port of Shimizu is also connected to other Japan ports. In particular, it is served by a Roll-on/roll-off service serving the port of Ōita, on the north-east coast of the southern island of Kyushu. This service, which sails three times a week and has a transit time of 20 hours, has enabled a modal shift of freight trucks from road to sea, thereby contributing to decreasing congestion and pollution on roads.

== Leisure ==
=== Football ===
Shimizu is famous as one of the top cities in Japan where football is quite popular. It is well known as the home town of a J.League team, Shimizu S-Pulse. An earlier club, Hagoromo Club (which spun off its parent company Nippon Light Metal) represented Shimizu in the old Japan Soccer League in the 1970s.

The local elementary schools and junior high schools equip fields with night lighting for soccer and Shimizu has maintained this infrastructure for a long time. Since 1987, the national soccer competition “Shimizu Cup” for boys and girls has been held in August.

A famous son of the city is Japan youth international and Celtic footballer, Koki Mizuno.

=== Local attractions ===
- Miho no Matsubara
- Nihondaira

== Notable people from Shimizu-ku, Shizuoka ==
- Ryota Oshima, footballer
- Alice Hirose, Japanese actress, TV personality, and model
- Suzu Hirose, Japanese actress and model
- Hidetsugu Shibata, Japanese comedian
- Hollywood Zakoshisyoh, Japanese comedian
- Kyōhei Shibata, Japanese actor and singer
- Kenta Hasegawa, former Japanese footballer, current manager of Nagoya Grampus
- Karen Koga, mononymously known as Karen, singer, member of Little Glee Monster
- Takako Katō, Japanese actress and former J-pop singer
- Toshinobu Kubota, Japanese singer, songwriter, musician, music producer, and radio personality
- Momoko Sakura, Japanese manga artist
- Sei Hatsuno, Japanese writer
- Shunpūtei Shōta, Japanese rakugo comedian
- Sōgen Asahina, Japanese Rinzai zen master
- Suguru Iwazaki, Nippon Professional Baseball pitcher for the Hanshin Tigers in Japan's Central League
- Kosuke Kato, former professional baseball pitcher
- Carlos Amano, retired professional wrestler (Real Name: Rieko Amano, Nihongo: 天野 理恵子, Amano Rieko)
- Junya Sano, road bicycle racer
- Yoshio Mochizuki, Japanese politician of the Liberal Democratic Party, a former member of the House of Representatives in the Diet (national legislature), and a Minister of the Environment
- Masatoshi Kurata, Japanese politician of the Liberal Democratic Party and a former member of the House of Representatives in the Diet (national legislature)
- Koichi Takemasa, Japanese politician, member of the House of Representatives in the Diet (national legislature) and a member of the Democratic Party of Japan
- Mariko Suga, wife of former Japanese Prime Minister Yoshihide Suga
- Kwon Hyi-ro, Zainichi Korean murderer who brought public attention to discrimination against the Zainichi Koreans in Japan
