= Yui, Shizuoka =

Yui 由比町
- Former municipality
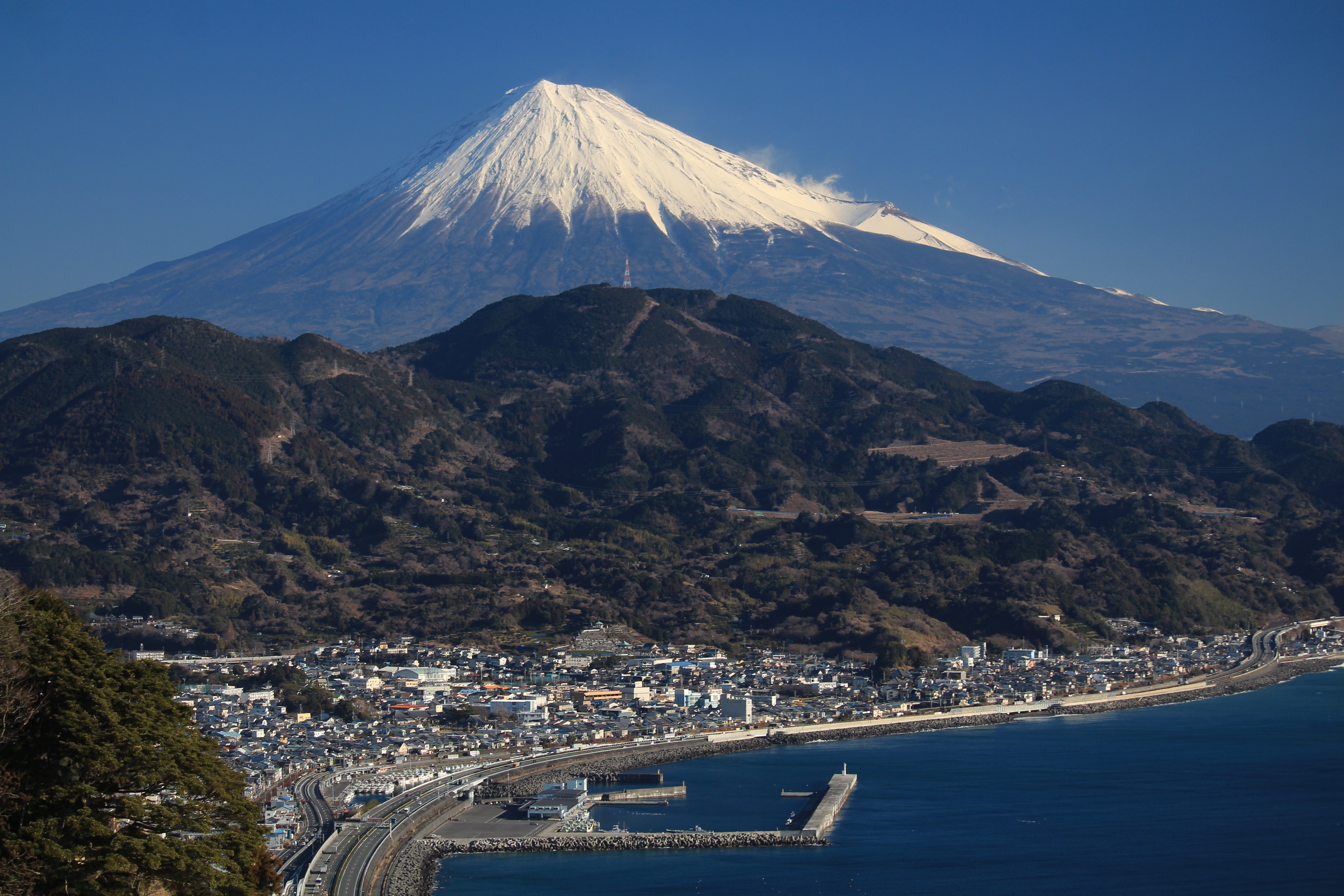
- Yui and Mount Fuji

- Flag Seal

- Location of Yui in Shizuoka Prefecture

- Location in Japan
- Coordinates: 35°6′N 138°34′E
- Country: Japan
- Region: Chūbu (Tōkai)
- Prefecture: Shizuoka Prefecture
- District: Ihara
- Merged: November 1, 2008 (now part of Shimizu-ku, Shizuoka)

Area
  - Total: 23.03 km^{2} (8.89 sq mi)

Population (October 1, 2008)
  - Total: 9,085
  - Density: 394.5/km^{2} (1,022/sq mi)
- Time zone: UTC+09:00 (JST)
- Symbols
- Bird: uguisu
- Flower: Sakura
- Tree: Osmanthus

Yui (由比町, Yui-chō) was a town located in Ihara District, Shizuoka Prefecture, Japan.

As of October 1, 2008, the town had an estimated population of 9,085 and a density of 394.5 persons per km^{2}. The total area was 23.03 km^{2}.

On November 1, 2008, Yui was merged into the Shimizu-ku ward of the expanded city of Shizuoka. Ihara District was dissolved as a result of this merger.

== Town outline ==
Yui was well known for cherry shrimp (桜海老, sakura-ebi), a small variety of shrimp found in Suruga Bay.

Yui's flag displayed the character "由" to represent the town and 12 stamens; one for each of the wards. These are contained within orange blossoms, a special product of Yui. Around the flower, a seagull represents peace and equality. Yui's symbols were the bush warbler, fragrant olive, and cherry blossoms.

The town had two elementary schools and one junior high school.

Yui is served by Yui Station on the Tōkaidō Main Line.

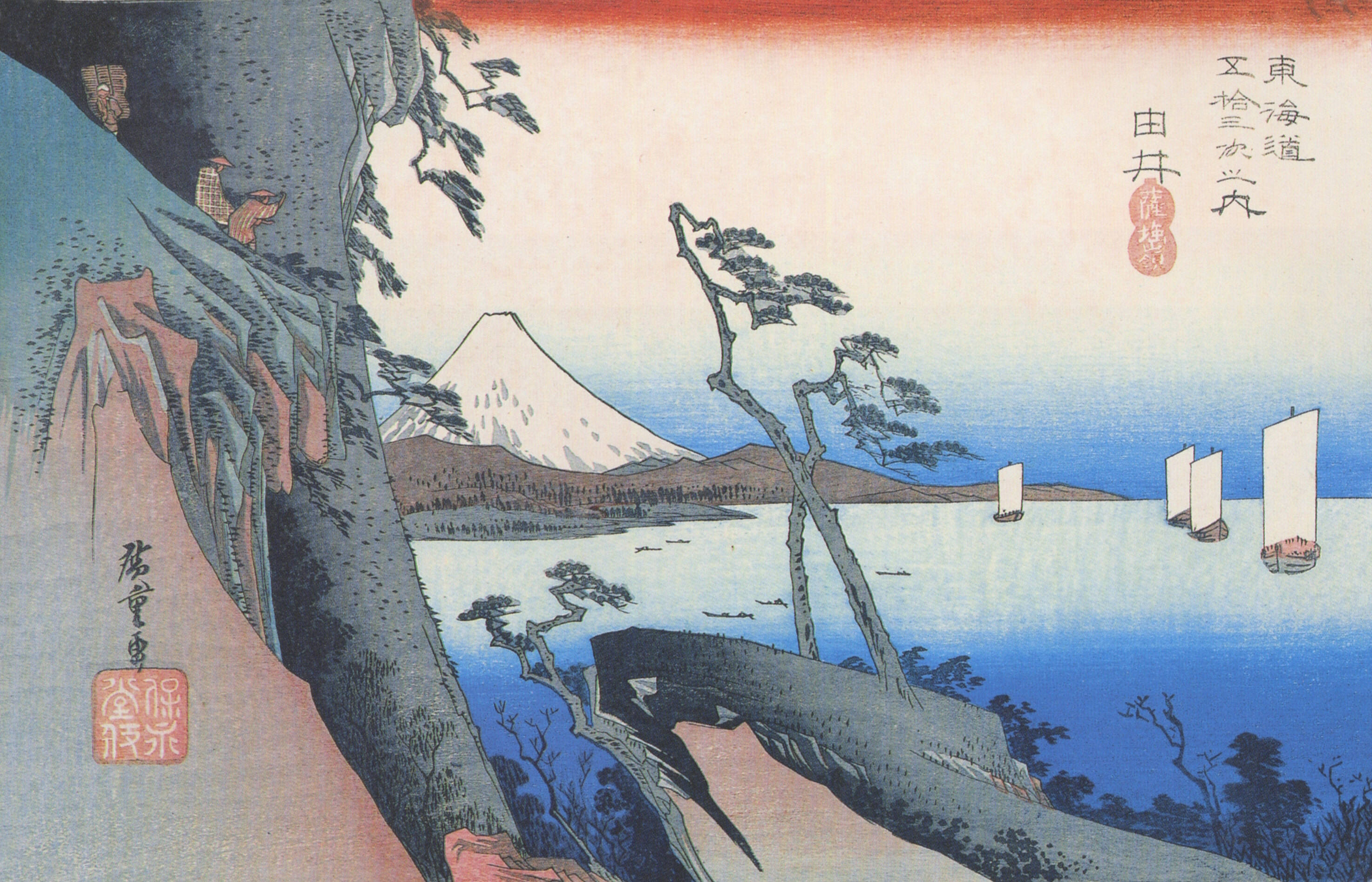
The countryside around Yui in the 1830s, as depicted by Hiroshige in The Fifty-Three Stations of the Tōkaidō

Yui streets in 1961
