= Kanbara =

Kanbara may refer to:

- Kanbara, Shizuoka, a former town located in Ihara District, Shizuoka Prefecture, Japan; merged into the city of Shizuoka in 2006
- Kanbara-juku, a former post station of the Tōkaidō
- Kanbara, Gunma, a village buried during the 1783 eruption of Mount Asama, which killed 467 people
