= Fujikawa, Shizuoka =

Fujikawa 富士川町
- Former municipality
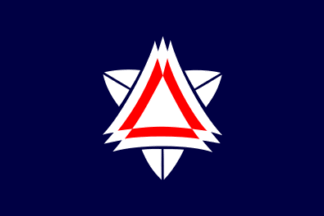
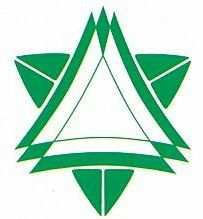
- Flag Emblem

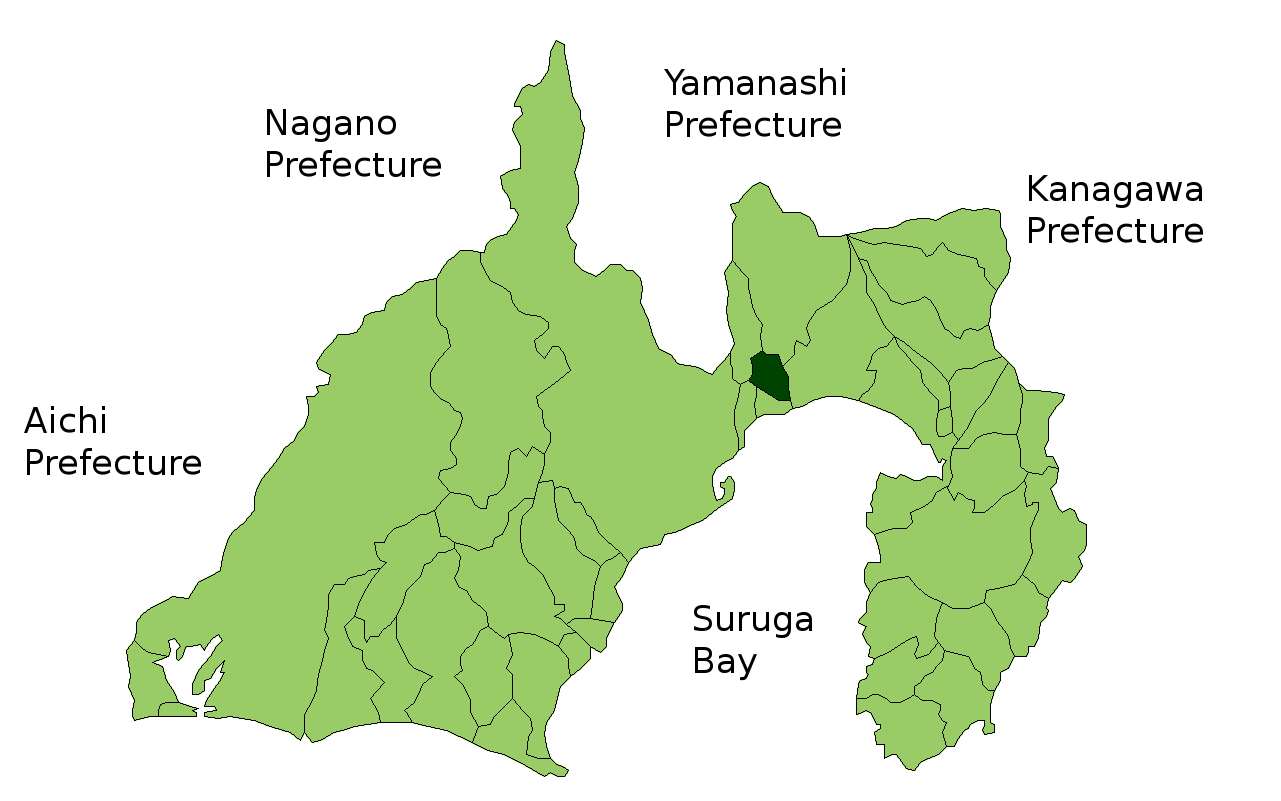
- Location of Fujikawa in Shizuoka Prefecture

- Location in Japan
- Coordinates: 35°9′N 138°37′E
- Country: Japan
- Region: Chūbu (Tōkai)
- Prefecture: Shizuoka Prefecture
- District: Ihara
- Merged: November 1, 2008 (now part of Fuji)

Area
  - Total: 30.92 km^{2} (11.94 sq mi)

Population (April 1, 2005)
  - Total: 16,359
  - Density: 529/km^{2} (1,370/sq mi)
- Time zone: UTC+09:00 (JST)

Fujikawa (富士川町, Fujikawa-chō) was a town located in Ihara District, Shizuoka Prefecture, Japan.

As of November 2008, the town had an estimated population of 16,359 and a density of 529 persons per km^{2}. The total area was 30.92 km^{2}.

On November 1, 2008, Fujikawa was merged into the expanded city of Fuji. Ihara District was dissolved as a result of this merger.

Fujikawa Village was founded on April 1, 1889. It attained town status on January 25, 1901. The town had a station (Fujikawa Station on the Tōkaidō Main Line and an interchange on the Tōmei Expressway. The view of the Tōkaidō Shinkansen crossing a bridge with Mount Fuji in the background that is still used in many tourist promotion publications for Japan was taken at Fujikawa.
