= Kanbara, Shizuoka =

Kanbara 蒲原町
- Former municipality
- Flag Emblem

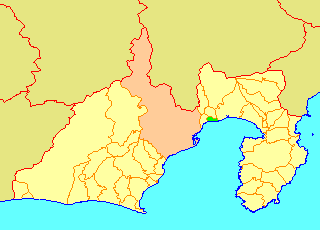
- Location of Kanbara in Shizuoka Prefecture

- Location in Japan
- Coordinates: 35.1159°N 138.5949°E
- Country: Japan
- Region: Chūbu (Tōkai)
- Prefecture: Shizuoka Prefecture
- District: Ihara
- Merged: March 31, 2006 (now part of Shimizu-ku, Shizuoka)

Area
  - Total: 14.69 km^{2} (5.67 sq mi)

Population (March 1, 2006)
  - Total: 12,777
  - Density: 870/km^{2} (2,300/sq mi)
- Time zone: UTC+09:00 (JST)
- Symbols
- Flower: Rhododendron
- Tree: Pine

Kanbara (蒲原町, Kanbara-chō) was a town located in Ihara District, Shizuoka Prefecture, Japan.

As of March 1, 2006, the town had an estimated population of 12,777 and a density of 870 persons per km^{2}. The total area was 14.69 km^{2}.

On March 31, 2006, Kanbara was merged into the Shimizu-ku Ward of the expanded city of Shizuoka and thus no longer exists as an independent municipality.

During the Edo period, Kanbara developed as Kanbara-juku, a post station on the Tōkaidō highway connecting Edo with Kyoto. From the Meiji period onward, Kanbara became an industrial town in Shizuoka Prefecture, with aluminum smelters from Nippon Light Metals Company predominating until been closed in 2014. It was the last remaining aluminum smelter in Japan, having survived on cheap hydro-electric power after all other smelters in Japan were closed in 1975-1987 period.

The town was served by Kambara Station on the Tōkaidō Main Line railway and by an interchange on the Tōmei Expressway.
