= Fujikawa Station (Shizuoka) =

Railway station in Fuji, Shizuoka Prefecture, Japan

CA09 Fujikawa Station 富士川駅
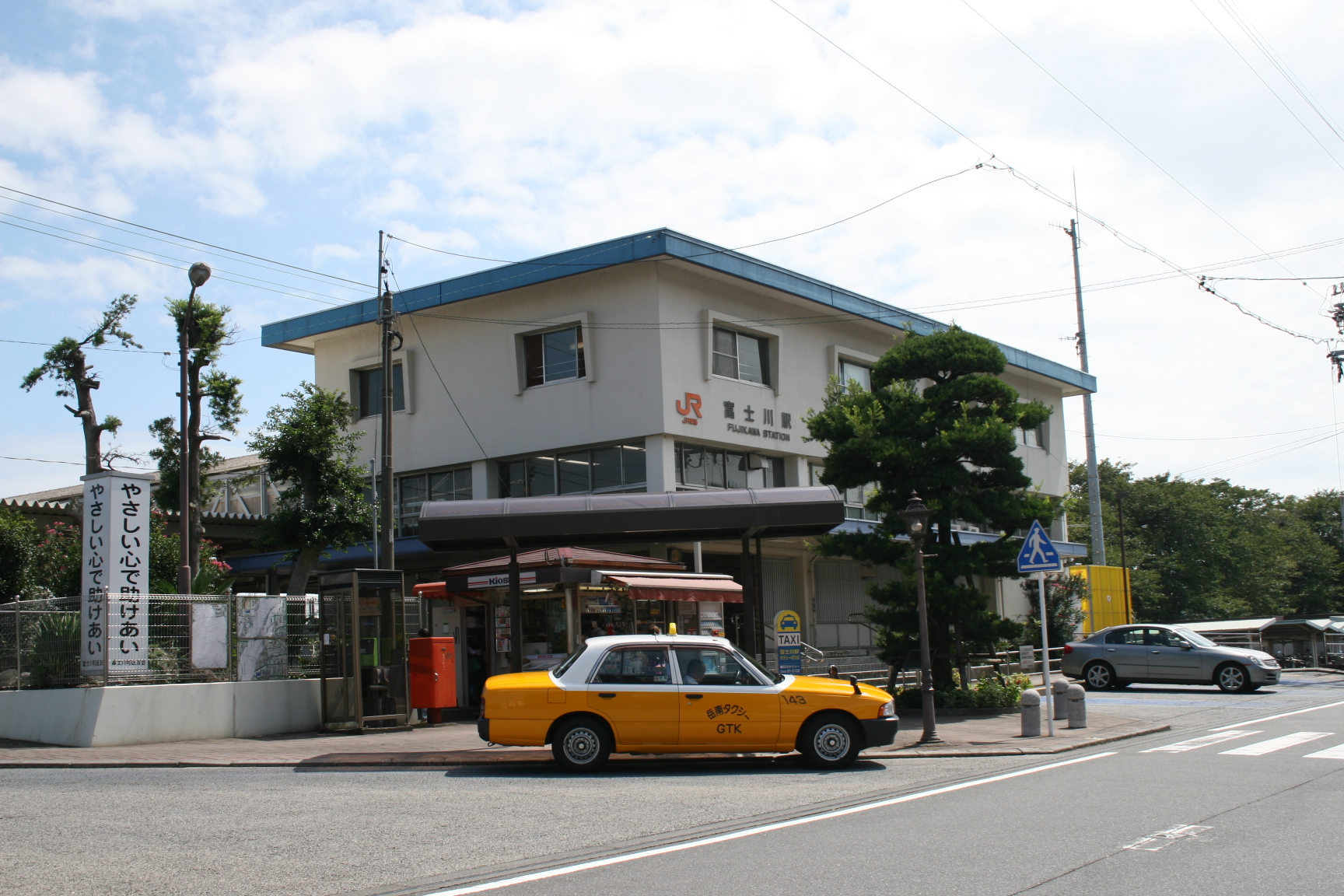
- JR Fujikawa Station in 2007

General information
- Location: Naka-no-go 1228-4, Fuji-shi, Shizuoka-ken; Japan
- Coordinates: 35°8′28″N 138°37′6″E
- Operator: JR Central
- Line: Tōkaidō Main Line
- Distance: 149.7 km from Tokyo
- Platforms: 1 side +1 island platform
- Tracks: 3

Other information
- Status: Staffed
- Website: Official website

History
- Opened: February 1, 1889; 137 years ago
- Former names: Iwabuchi (to 1970)

Passengers
- 2017: 1484 daily
Location
- Location within Shizuoka Prefecture Location within Japan

Fujikawa Station (富士川駅, Fujikawa eki) is a train station in the city of Fuji, Shizuoka Prefecture, Japan operated by Central Japan Railway Company (JR Tōkai).

== Lines ==
Fujikawa Station is served by the JR Central Tōkaidō Main Line, and is located 149.7 kilometers from the official starting point of the line at Tokyo.

== Station layout ==
Fujikawa Station has a single side platform serving Track 1 and an island platform serving Track 2 and Track 3, connected to the station building by a footbridge. Track 2 is used for through transit of express trains. The station is staffed.

=== Platforms ===
1	■ Tōkaidō Main Line	For Numazu・Mishima・Atami
2	■ Tōkaidō Main Line	For express trains
3	■ Tōkaidō Main Line	For Shizuoka・Hamamatsu

== Adjacent stations ==
«	Service	»
Central Japan Railway Company
Tōkaidō Main Line
Rapid: Does not stop at this station
Limited Express Fujikawa: Does not stop at this station
Sleeper Limited Express Sunrise Izumo: Does not stop at this station
Sleeper Limited Express Sunrise Seto: Does not stop at this station
Fuji	Local	Shin-Kambara

== Station history ==
Fujikawa Station first opened as Iwabuchi Station (岩淵駅, Iwabuchi-eki) on February 1, 1889, when the section of the Tōkaidō Main Line connecting Shizuoka with Kōzu was completed. The initial plan for the Tōkaidō Main Line was to construct stations in accord with the traditional 53 stages of the Tōkaidō road. However, in between Fujikawa-juku and Kanbara-juku there was a traditionally unnumbered intermediary post station where a branch road led to the pilgrimage location of Mount Minobu. It was decided to build a railroad station at this location, and to bypass nearby Kambara Town instead. This led to a predictable uproar from Kambara, so Kambara Station was built a year later, but at an inconvenient distance outside of town, so as to keep the spacing between stations fairly even. A station in the center of Kambara was not actually built until Shin-Kambara Station in 1968. Iwabuchi Station was renamed "Fujikawa" in 1970.

Station numbering was introduced to the section of the Tōkaidō Line operated JR Central in March 2018; Fujikawa Station was assigned station number CA09.

== Passenger statistics ==
In fiscal 2016, the station was used by an average of 1484 passengers daily (boarding passengers only).

== Surrounding area ==
- Fujikawa Post Office

== See also ==
- List of railway stations in Japan
