= Sakurabashi Station =

Sakurabashi Station (桜橋駅) is the name of train stations in Japan:

- Sakurabashi Station (Shizuoka)
- Sakurabashi Station (Toyama)
- Kitashinchi Station in Osaka, which was planned and constructed under the provisional name Sakurabashi Station
