= Japan National Route 150 =

National highway in Japan

National Route 150
- 国道150号
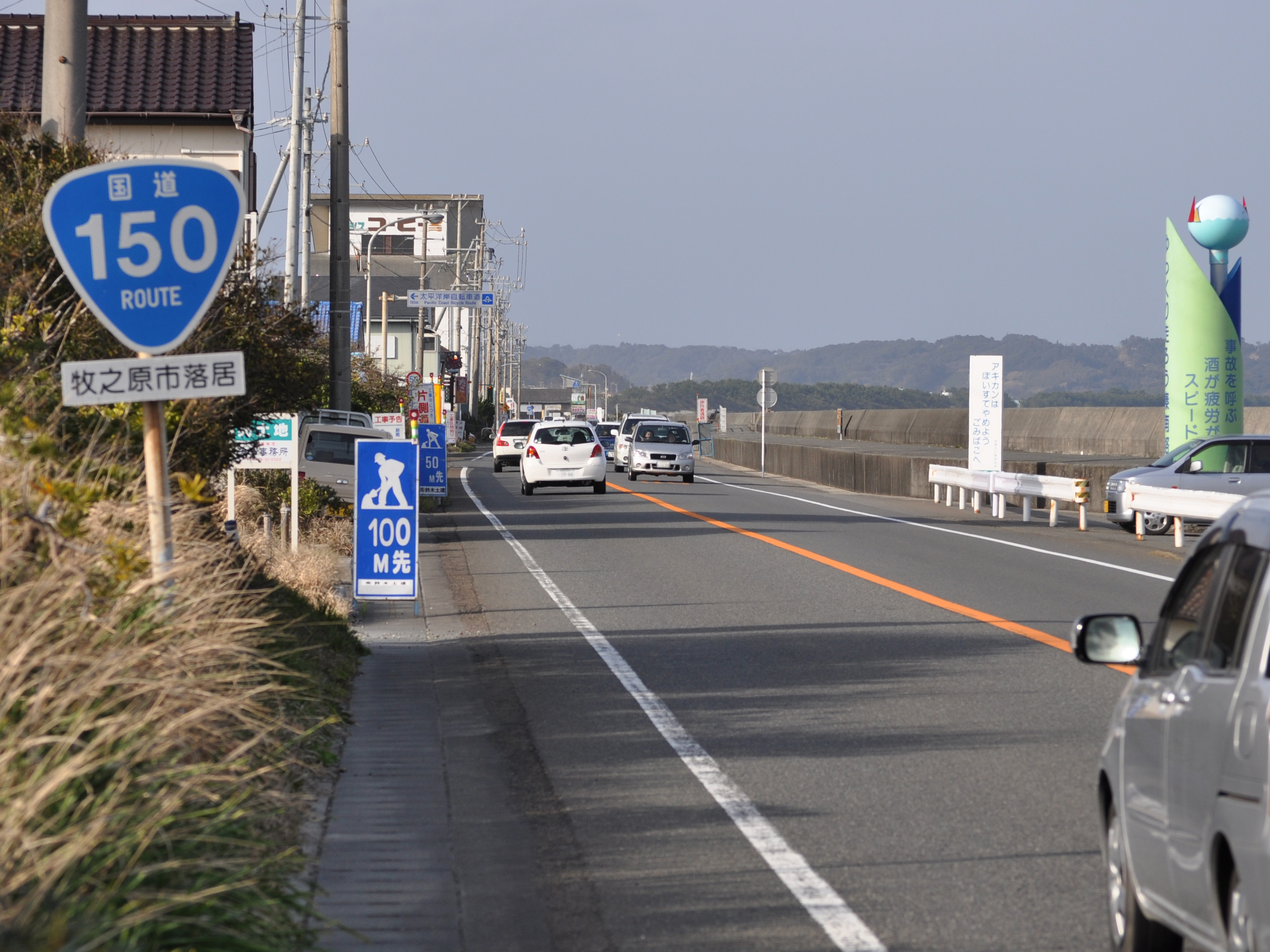

Route information
- Length: 102.2 km (63.5 mi)
- Existed: 1953–present

Major junctions
- East end: National Route 149 in Shimizu-ku, Shizuoka
- West end: National Route 152 in Chūō-ku, Hamamatsu

Location
- Country: Japan

Highway system
- National highways of Japan; Expressways of Japan
← National Route 149	→ National Route 151

National Route 150 is a national highway of Japan connecting Shimizu-ku, Shizuoka and Chūō-ku, Hamamatsu in Japan, with a total length of 102.2 km (63.5 mi).
