= Japan National Route 149 =

Road in Shizuoka prefecture, Japan

National Route 149
- 国道149号
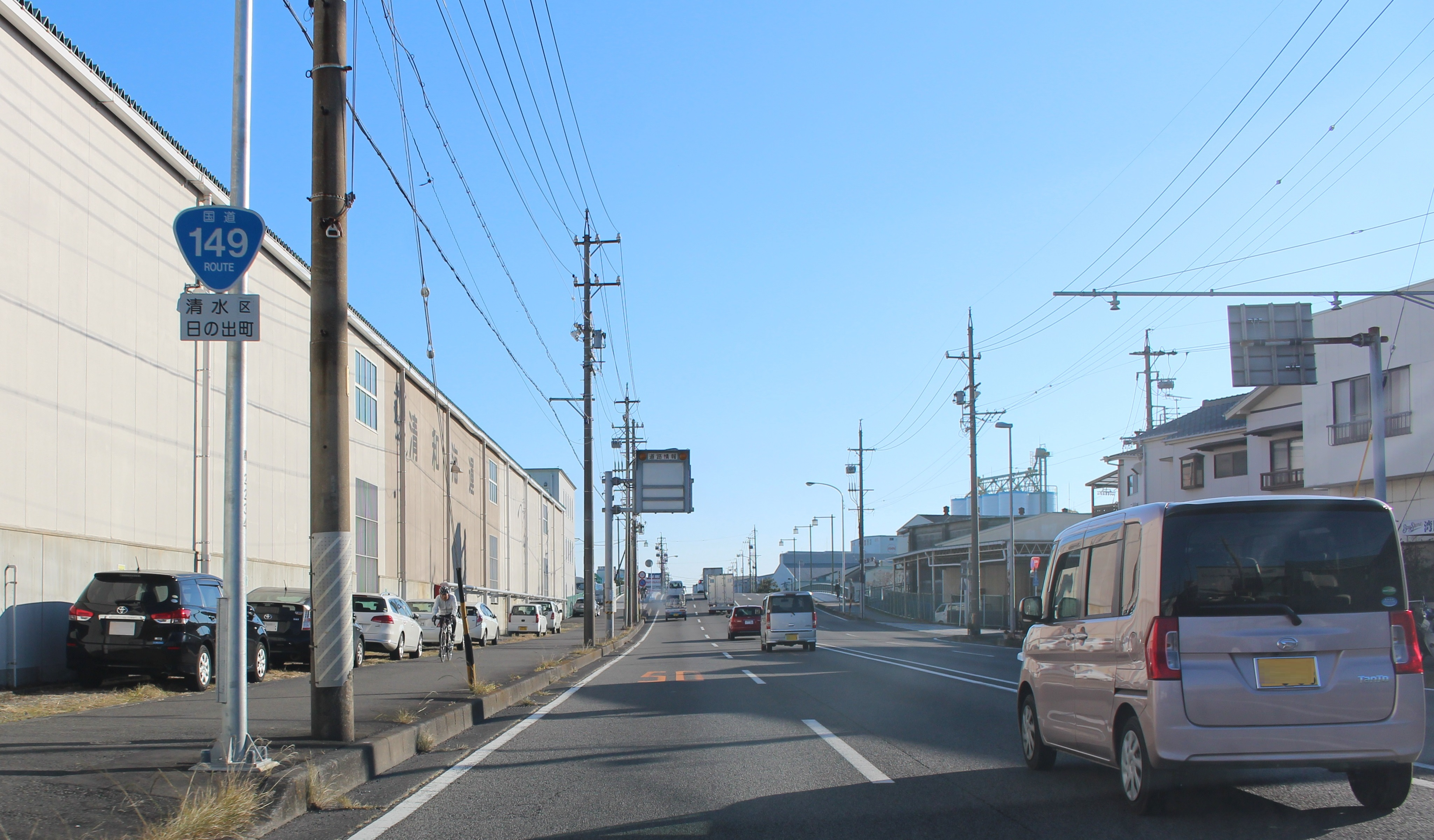

Route information
- Length: 2.6 km (1.6 mi)

Major junctions
- South end: National Route 150 at Port of Shimizu
- North end: National Route 1 in Shimizu-ku, Shizuoka

Location
- Country: Japan

Highway system
- National highways of Japan; Expressways of Japan
← National Route 148	→ National Route 150

National Route 149 is a national highway of Japan connecting Shimizu-ku, Shizuoka and Shimizu-ku, Shizuoka in Japan, with a total length of 2.6 km (1.62 mi).
