= Ihara District, Shizuoka =

Former district in Shizuoka prefecture, Japan

Ihara District (庵原郡, Ihara-gun) was a rural district located in central Shizuoka Prefecture, Japan.

As of the end of 2008 (the last data available before its dissolution), the district had an estimated population of 26,859 and a population density of 497.85 persons per km^{2}. Its total area was 53.95 km^{2}.

== History ==
Ihara District was created in the early Meiji cadastral reforms of April 1, 1889, with four towns (Ejiri, Yui, Okitsu, and Kanbara) and ten villages. Fujikawa Fujikawa was raised to town status on January 1, 1901, followed by Tsuji on August 1, 1918. However, both Ejiri and Tsuji were transferred to Abe District on January 13, 1924, leaving the district with four towns and nine villages.

The village of Sodeshi was raised to town status on April 8, 1948, and the village of Nishina was annexed by the city of Shizuoka on April 8, 1948. In 1954 the city of Shimizu annexed the villages of Takabe and Iida, and in 1957, the village of Uchibo was transferred to Fuji District. Later that year, the town of Fujikawa annexed Matsuno village. In 1961, the towns of Okitsu and Sodeshi along with three villages were annexed by the city of Shimizu.

=== Recent mergers ===
- On March 31, 2006 - the town of Kambara was merged into the expanded city of Shizuoka, specifically at Shimizu-ku.
- On November 1, 2008:
  - the town of Yui was also merged into the expanded city of Shizuoka, specifically at Shimizu-ku
  - the town of Fujikawa was merged into the expanded city of Fuji. Therefore, Ihara District was dissolved as a result of this merger.
