= Mikadodai Station =

Railway station in Shizuoka, Japan

Mikadodai Station 御門台駅
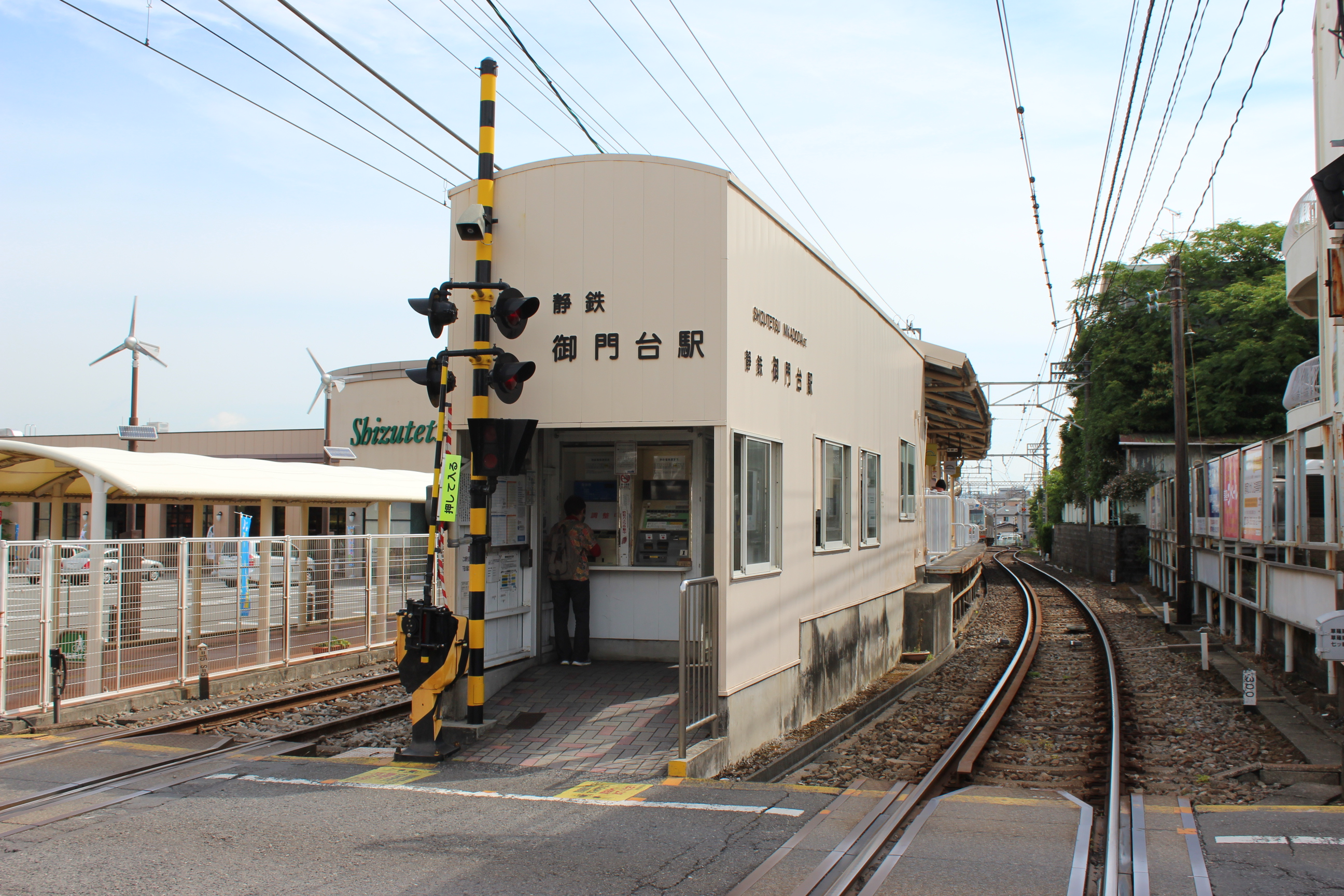
- Mikadodai Station in June 2010

General information
- Location: Nanatsu Shinya, Shimizu-ku, Shizuoka-shi, Shizuoka-ken; Japan
- Coordinates: 35.007803°N 138.452388°E
- Operator: Shizuoka Railway
- Line: ■ Shizuoka–Shimizu Line
- Distance: 7.4 km from Shin-Shizuoka
- Platforms: 1 island platform

Other information
- Station code: S11

History
- Opened: December 9, 1908
- Former names: Udo-gakkōmae (to 1961)

Passengers
- FY2017: 1421 (daily)

Services
Preceding station	Shizuoka Railway	Following station
Kusanagi towards Shin-Shizuoka	Shizuoka–Shimizu Line Commuter Express	Kitsunegasaki One-way operation
Kusanagi One-way operation	Shizuoka–Shimizu Line Express	Kitsunegasaki towards Shin-Shimizu
Kusanagi towards Shin-Shizuoka	Shizuoka–Shimizu Line Local	Kitsunegasaki towards Shin-Shimizu
Location
- Location within Shizuoka Prefecture Location within Japan

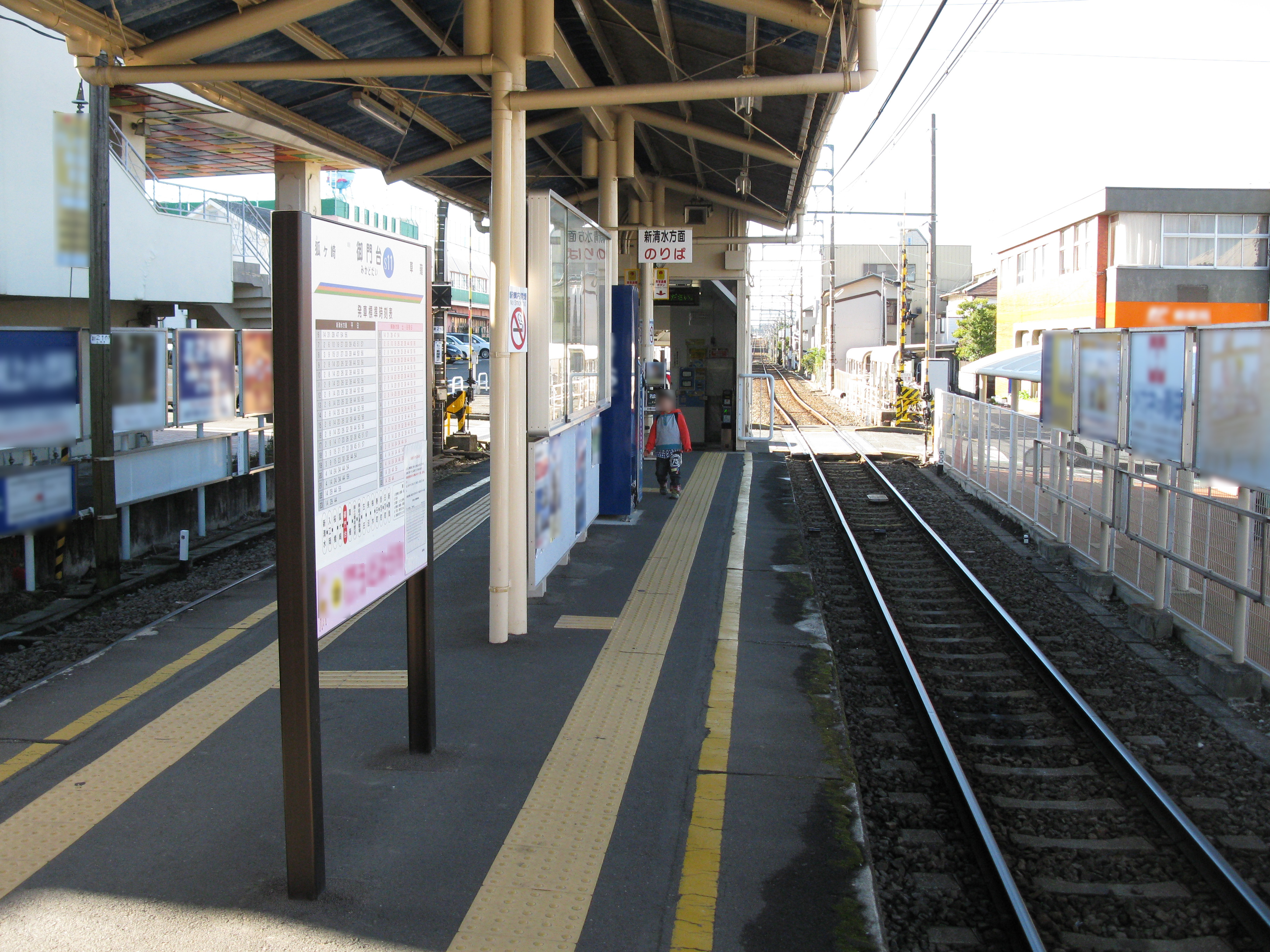
Platforms in 2010

Mikadodai Station (御門台駅, Mikadodai-eki) is a railway station in Suruga-ku, Shizuoka, Shizuoka Prefecture, Japan, operated by the private railway company, Shizuoka Railway (Shizutetsu).

== Lines ==
Mikadodai Station is a station on the Shizuoka–Shimizu Line and is 7.4 kilometers from the starting point of the line at Shin-Shizuoka Station.

== Station layout ==
The station has a single island platform. The station building is built on the south end of the platform, and has automated ticket machines, and automated turnstiles, which accept the LuLuCa smart card ticketing system as well as the PiTaPa and ICOCA IC cards. The station is wheelchair accessible.

=== Platforms ===
1	■ Shizuoka-Shimizu Line	for Sakurabashi and Shin-Shimizu
2	■ Shizuoka–Shimizu Line	for Kusanagi and Shin-Shizuoka

== Station History ==
Mikadodai Station was established as Udo-gakkōmae Station (有度学校前駅, Udō-gakkōmae-eki) on December 9, 1908. It was renamed to its present name on March 1, 1961.

== Passenger statistics ==
In fiscal 2017, the station was used by an average of 1421 passengers daily (boarding passengers only).

== Surrounding area ==
- Udo Elementary School

== See also ==
- List of railway stations in Japan
