= Ejiri-juku =

Eighteenth of the 53 stations of the Tōkaidō in Japan

Coordinates: 35.023495°N 138.487043°E

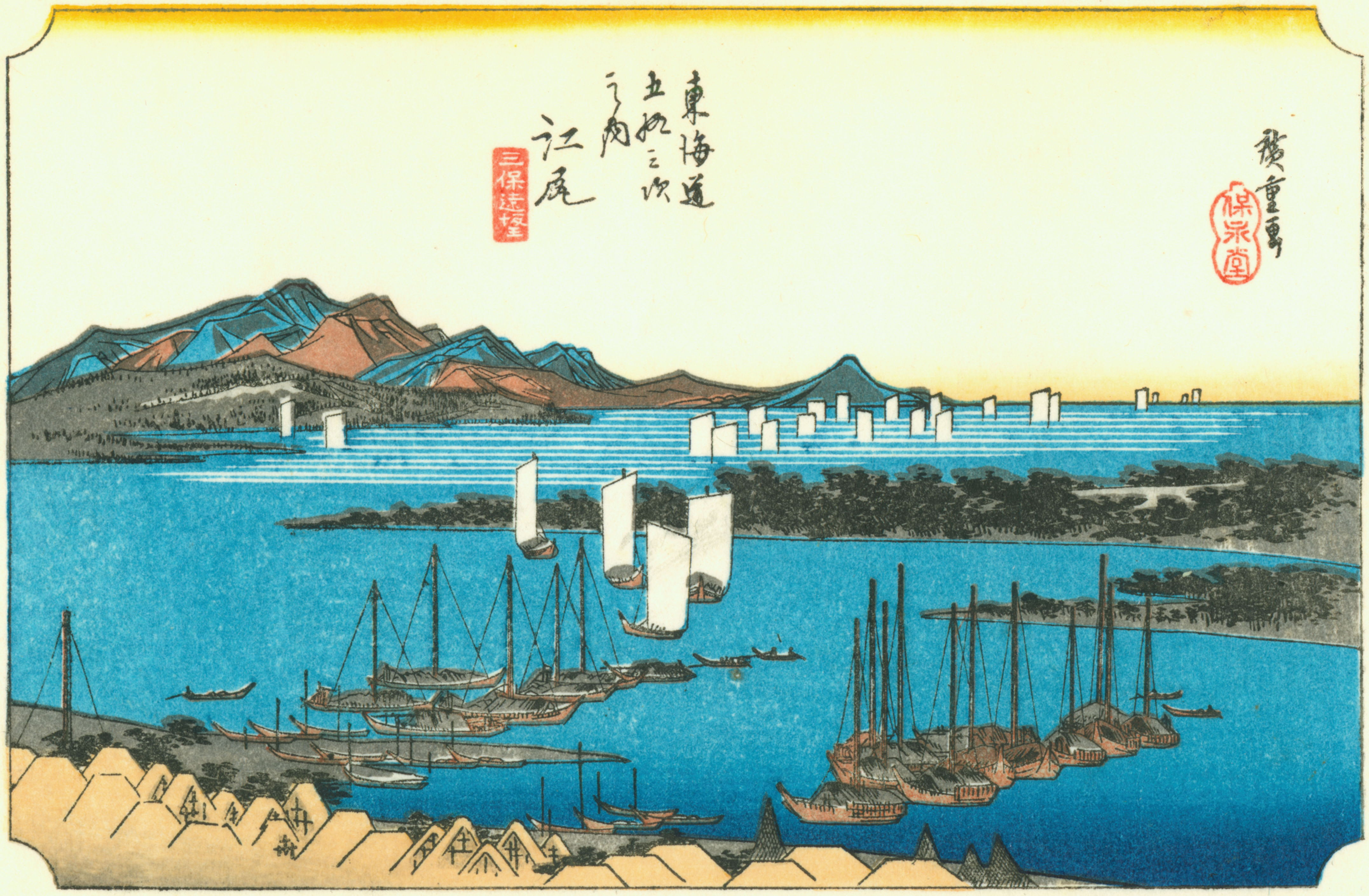
Ejiri-juku in the 1830s, as depicted by Hiroshige in The Fifty-three Stations of the Tōkaidō

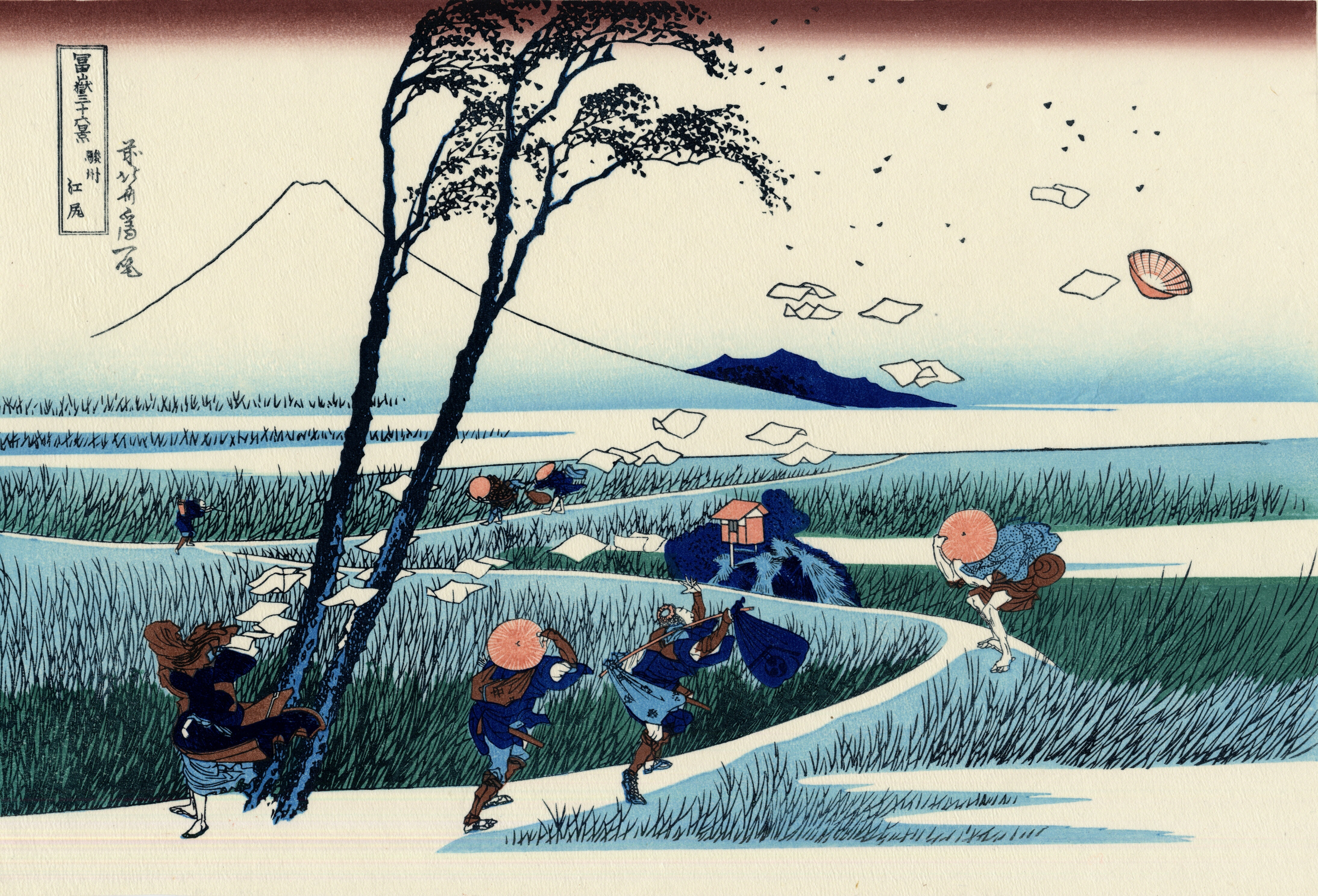
Ejiri in Suruga Province around 1830, as depicted by Hokusai in Thirty-six Views of Mount Fuji

Ejiri-juku (江尻宿, Ejiri-juku) was the eighteenth of the fifty-three stations of the Tōkaidō. It is one of four former post stations located in what is now part of the Shimizu-ku area of Shizuoka, Shizuoka Prefecture, Japan. It was 3.4 kilometers from Okitsu-juku, the preceding post station.

== History ==
Ejiri-juku was Ejiri Castle's castle town. The castle was built in 1570, but Ejiri-juku was not officially designated a post station until the early 17th century. At its peak, it had two honjin, three sub-honjin and 50 hatago, among the 1,340 total buildings. Its population was around 6,500. Ejiri-juku gave its name to the area's railway station, until it was renamed Shimizu Station in 1934.

The classic ukiyo-e print by Andō Hiroshige (Hōeidō edition) from 1831–1834 depicts a view over the Miho no Matsubara with boats anchored in the foreground in front of a fishing village, with others sailing in Suruga Bay.

== Neighboring post towns ==
Tōkaidō
Okitsu-juku - Ejiri-juku - Fuchū-shuku
