= Okitsu-juku =

Seventeenth of the 53 stations of the Tōkaidō in Japan

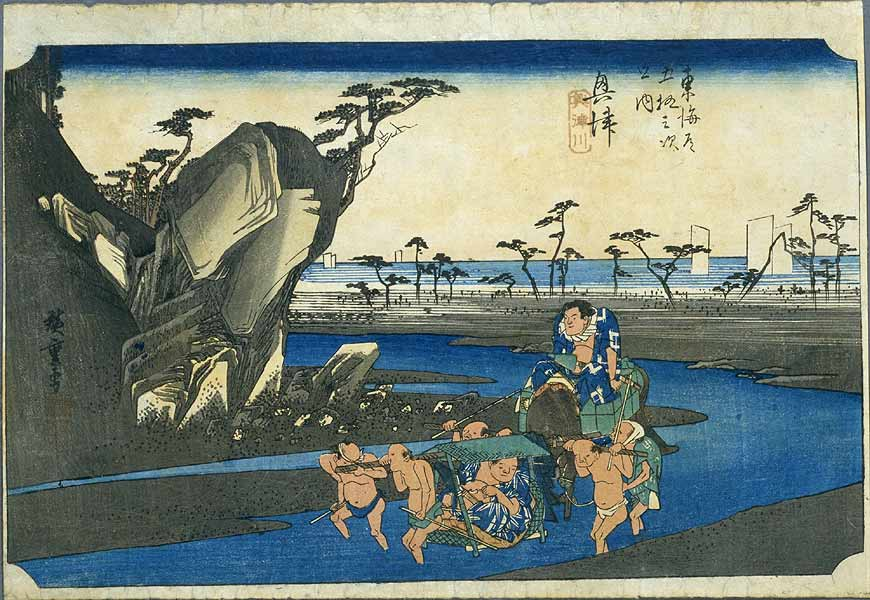
Okitsu-juku in the 1830s, as depicted by Hiroshige in The Fifty-three Stations of the Tōkaidō

Okitsu-juku (興津宿, Okitsu-juku) was the seventeenth of the fifty-three stations of the Tōkaidō. It is located in what is now part of the Shimizu-ku area of Shizuoka, Shizuoka Prefecture, Japan.

== History ==
Okitsu-juku was established in 1601, just before the beginning of the Edo period. At its peak, there were approximately 316 buildings and 1,668 people. Among the buildings were two honjin, two sub-honjin and 34 hatago. It was a little over 11 kilometers from the preceding post station, Yui-shuku.

The classic ukiyo-e print by Andō Hiroshige (Hōeidō edition) from 1831–1834 depicts two sumo wrestlers being carried across the Okitsu River, one on a packhorse and the other in a kago.

== Neighboring post towns ==
Tōkaidō
Yui-shuku - Okitsu-juku - Ejiri-juku
