= Shin-Kambara Station =

Railway station in Shizuoka, Japan

CA10 Shin-Kambara Station 新蒲原駅
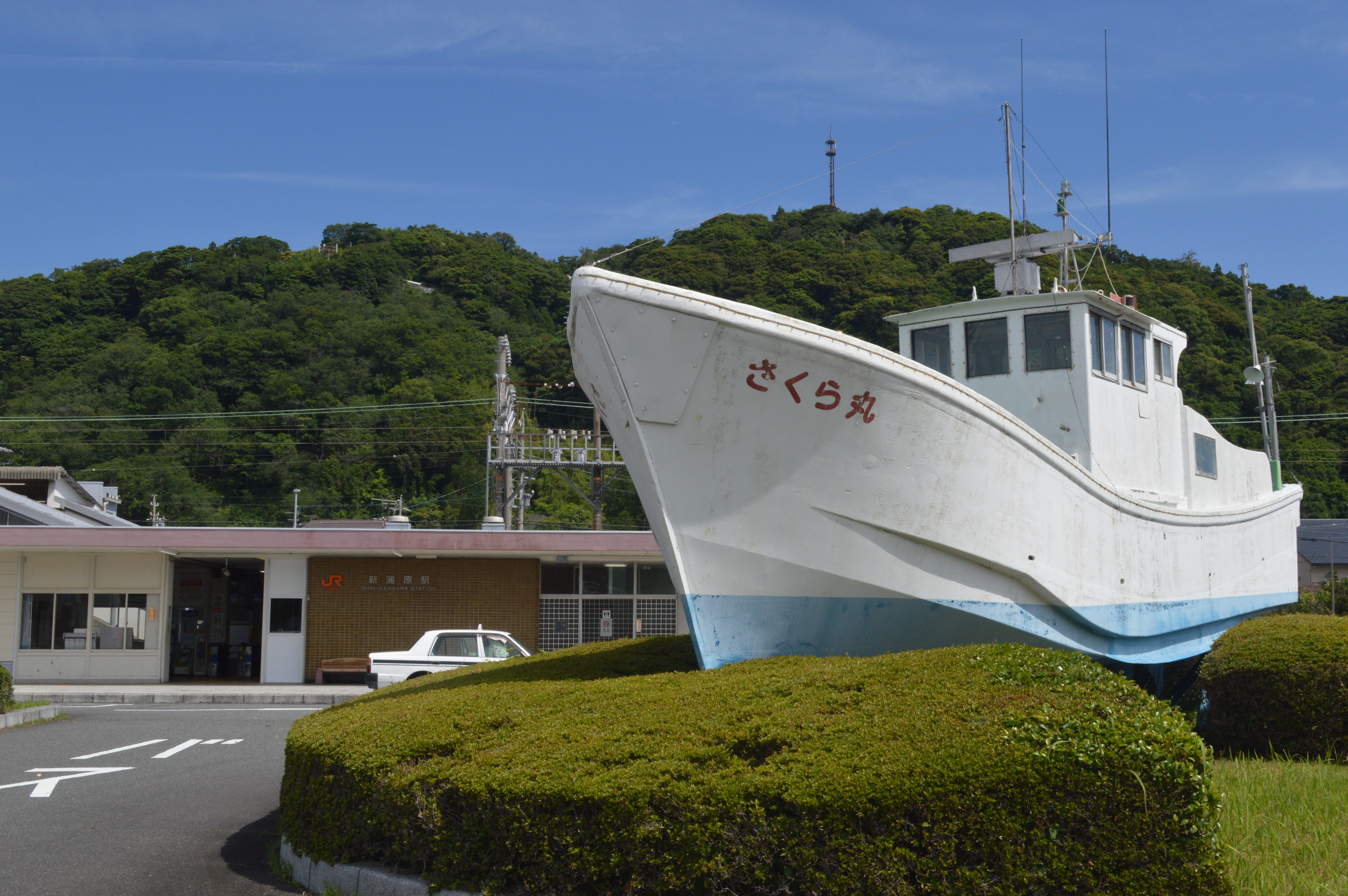
- JR Shin-Kambara Station in 2019

General information
- Location: Kambara 942, Shimizu-ku, Shizuoka-shi, Shizuoka-ken; Japan
- Coordinates: 35°7′10″N 138°36′30″E
- Operator: JR Central
- Line: Tokaido Main Line
- Distance: 152.5 kilometers from Tokyo
- Platforms: 2 side platforms
- Tracks: 2

Other information
- Status: Staffed
- Station code: CA10
- Website: Official website

History
- Opened: October 1, 1968

Passengers
- FY2017: 1,511 daily
Location
- Location within Shizuoka Prefecture Location within Japan

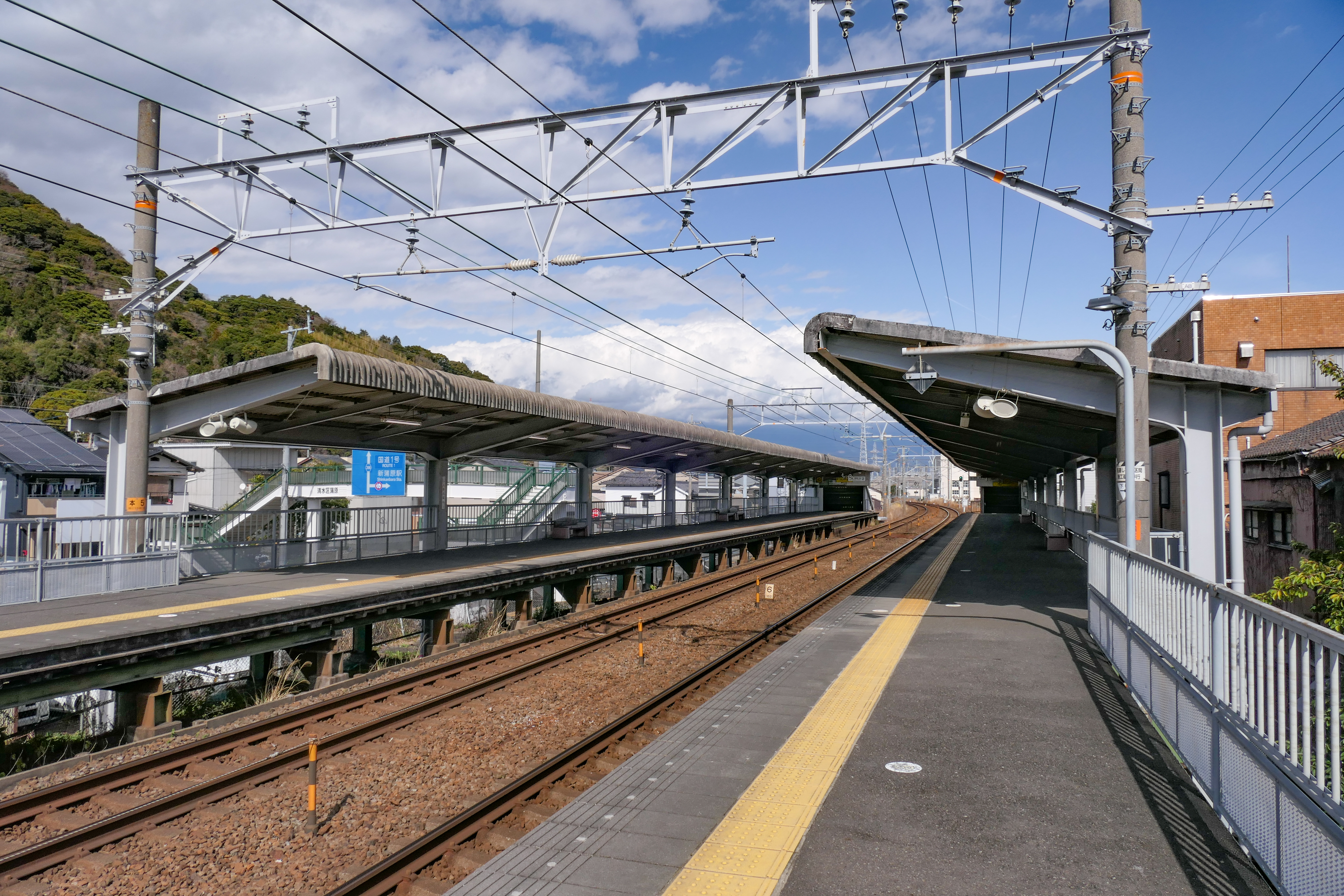
Station platforms, March 2022

Shin-Kambara Station (新蒲原駅, Shin-Kambara eki) is a railway station in Shimizu-ku Shizuoka City, Shizuoka Prefecture, Japan, operated by Central Japan Railway Company (JR Tōkai).

== Lines ==
Shin-Kambara Station is served by the Tōkaidō Main Line, and is located 152.5 kilometers from the starting point of the line at Tokyo Station.

== Station layout ==
The station has two opposing side platform serving Track 1 and Track 2 The platforms are connected to the station building by a footbridge. The station building has automated ticket machines, TOICA automated turnstiles and a staffed ticket office.

=== Platforms ===
1	■ Tōkaidō Main Line	For Shimizu・Shizuoka・Hamamatsu・Atami
2	■ Tōkaidō Main Line	For Fuji・Numazu・Mishima・Atami

== Adjacent stations ==
«	Service	»
Central Japan Railway Company
Tōkaidō Main Line
Rapid: Does not stop at this station
Commuter Rapid: Does not stop at this station
Limited Express Fujikawa: Does not stop at this station
Sleeper Limited Express Sunrise Izumo: Does not stop at this station
Sleeper Limited Express Sunrise Seto: Does not stop at this station
Fujikawa	Local	Kambara

== Station history ==
Shin-Kambara Station was opened on October 1, 1968, in response to a request by local citizens for a station closer to the center of town than the existing Kambara Station.

Station numbering was introduced to the section of the Tōkaidō Line operated JR Central in March 2018; Shin-Kambara Station was assigned station number CA10.

== Passenger statistics ==
In fiscal 2017, the station was used by an average of 1,511 passengers daily (boarding passengers only).

== Surrounding area ==
- Site of Kambara Castle

== See also ==
- List of railway stations in Japan
