= Nihondaira =

Scenic area in Shizuoka, Japan

Coordinates: 34°58′32″N 138°28′01″E

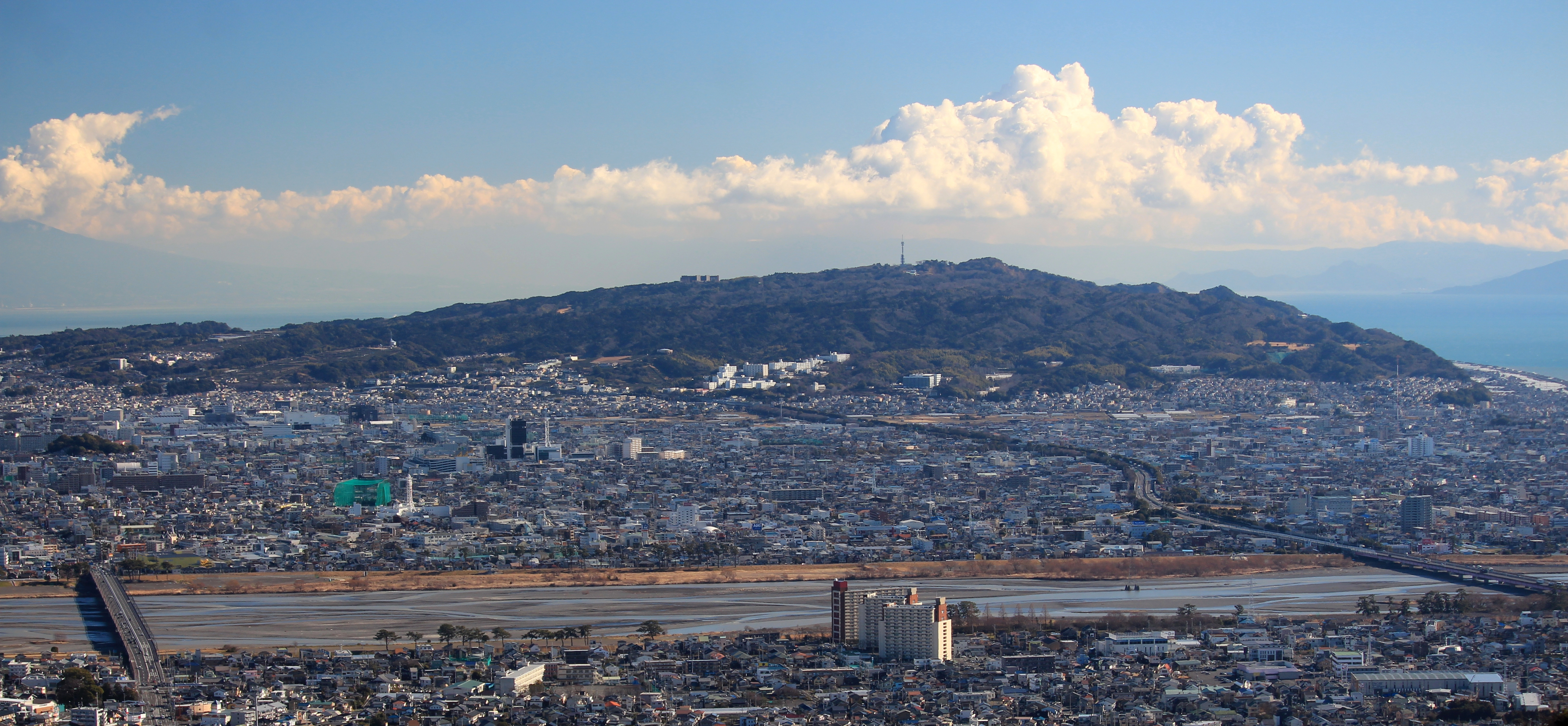
- Nihondaira and Abe River

Highest point
- Elevation: 307 m (1,007 ft)

Naming
- Native name: 日本平 (Japanese)

Geography
- Location within Shizuoka Prefecture Location within Japan
- Location: Shizuoka (city), Shizuoka Prefecture, Japan

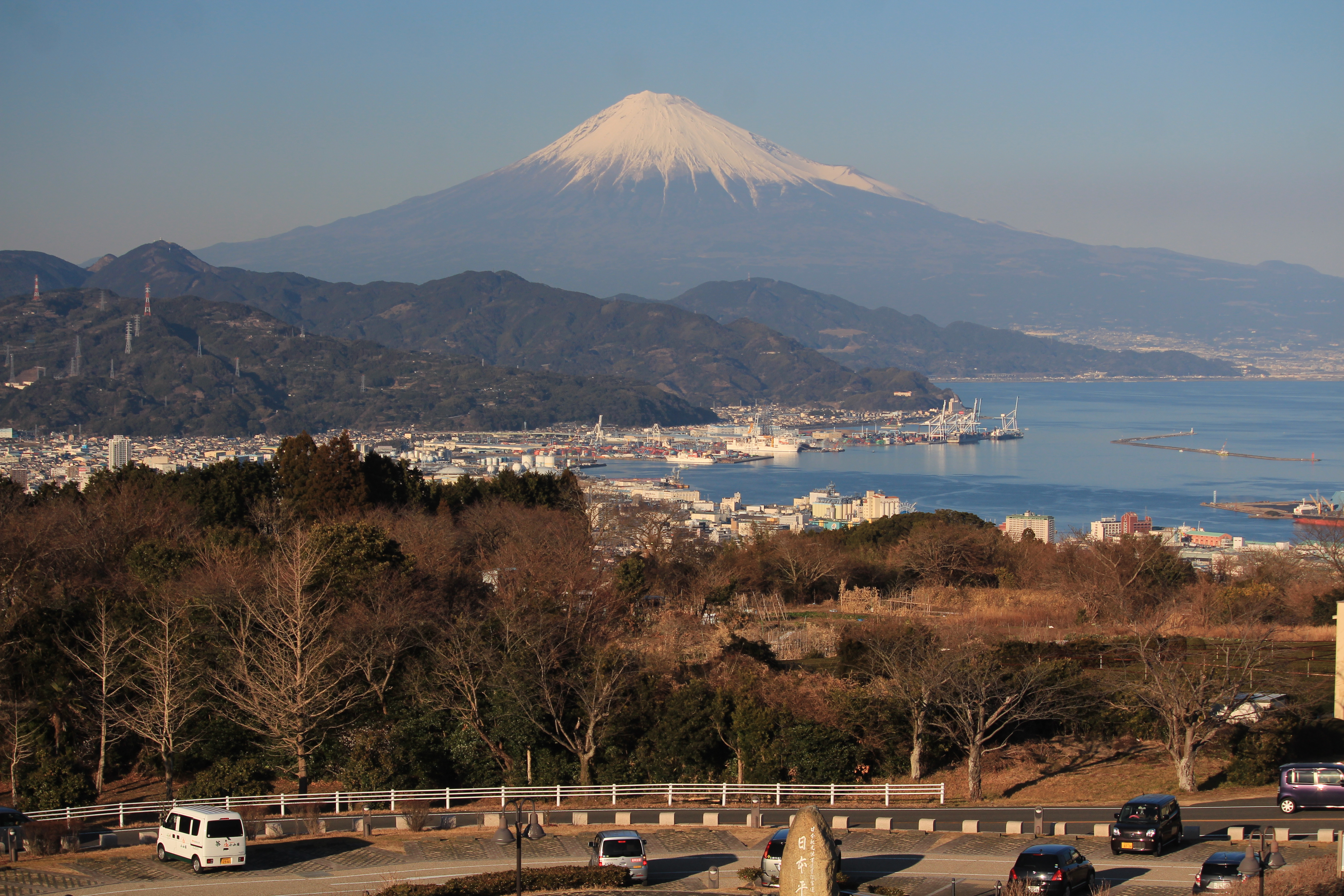
Mount Fuji and the port of Shimizu from Nihondaira

Nihondaira (日本平) is a scenic area located in Shimizu-ku, Shizuoka, Japan.

A plateau at the centre of Shizuoka city, with a maximum altitude of 308 metres (1,010 ft), Nihondaira is famous for its views of Mount Fuji, the Izu Peninsula, the Japanese Southern Alps, Shimizu Port, and Suruga Bay. It was selected by the Tokyo Nichi Nichi Shimbun and Osaka Mainichi Shimbun as one of the top 100 Landscapes of Japan in 1927 and a National Place of Scenic Beauty of Japan in 1954.

The Nihondaira Ropeway connects Nihondaira to Kunōzan Tōshō-gū in 5 minutes. The area lends its name to the home stadium of J.League football team Shimizu S-Pulse, who play at Nihondaira Stadium.

== Access ==
- By bus: from Shizuoka Station or Higashi-Shizuoka Station of JR Tōkaidō Main Line.
- By car: from Shizuoka IC or Shimizu IC of Tōmei Expressway.

== See also ==
- List of Places of Scenic Beauty of Japan (Shizuoka)
