= Nihondaira Ropeway =

Coordinates: 34°58′8.2″N 138°27′54.6″E

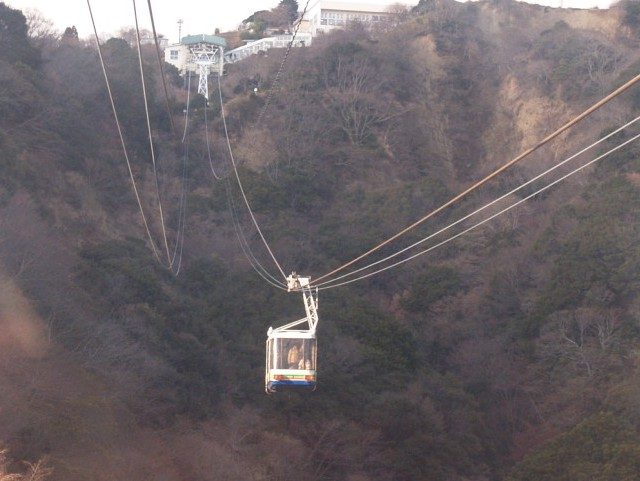
Nihondaira Ropeway

The Nihondaira Ropeway (日本平ロープウェイ, Nihondaira Rōpuwei) is a Japanese aerial lift line in the city of Shizuoka in Shizuoka Prefecture, operated by Shizuoka Railway (Shizutetsu). Opened in 1967, the line climbs Nihondaira (日本平), a hill with views of the city, Suruga Bay, and Mount Fuji. The ropeway connects Nihondaira station and Kunozan station, located next to Kunōzan Tōshō-gū shrine. The line does not accept LuLuCa, a smart card ticketing system by Shizutetsu.

== Basic data ==
- System: Aerial tramway, 3 cables
- Distance: 1.1 kilometres (0.7 mi)
- Vertical interval: 120 m (394 ft)
- Passenger capacity per a cabin: 47
- Cabins: 2
- Operational speed: 3.6 m/s
- Stations: 2
- Time required for single ride: 5 minutes

== See also ==
- Shizuoka Railway Shizuoka–Shimizu Line
- List of aerial lifts in Japan
