= Fuchū-shuku =

Nineteenth of the 53 stations of the Tōkaidō in Japan

Coordinates: 34°58′N 138°23′E

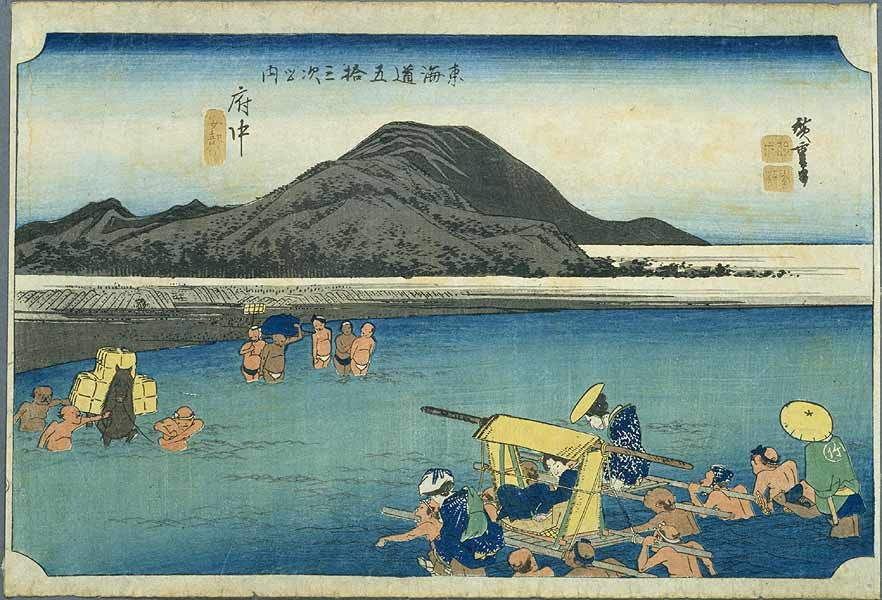
Fuchū-juku in the 1830s, as depicted by Hiroshige in The Fifty-three Stations of the Tōkaidō

Fuchū-juku (府中宿, Fuchū-juku) was the nineteenth of the fifty-three stations of the Tōkaidō. It is located in what is now part of the Aoi-ku area of Shizuoka, Shizuoka Prefecture, Japan.

== History ==
The post station of Fuchū-juku was also a castle town for Sunpu Castle in the former Suruga Province.

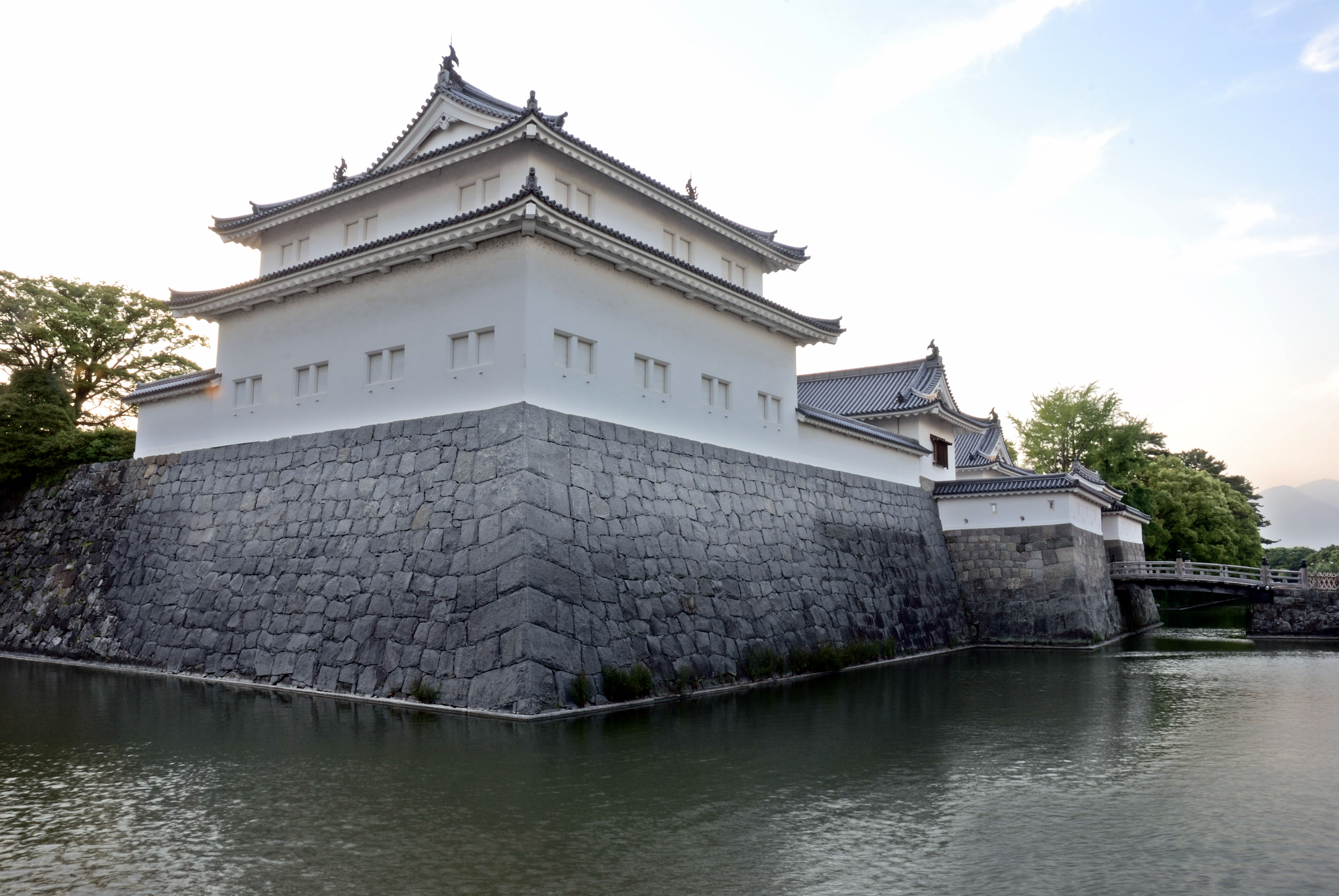
Sunpu Castle

The classic ukiyo-e print by Andō Hiroshige (Hōeidō edition) from 1831 to 1834 depicts travellers crossing the Abe River to the west of the post station. A woman is being carried in a kago, while other people are fording the stream on foot.

== Neighboring post towns ==
Tōkaidō
Ejiri-juku - Fuchū-juku - Mariko-juku
