= Kambara Station =

Railway station in Shizuoka, Japan

CA11 Kambara Station 蒲原駅
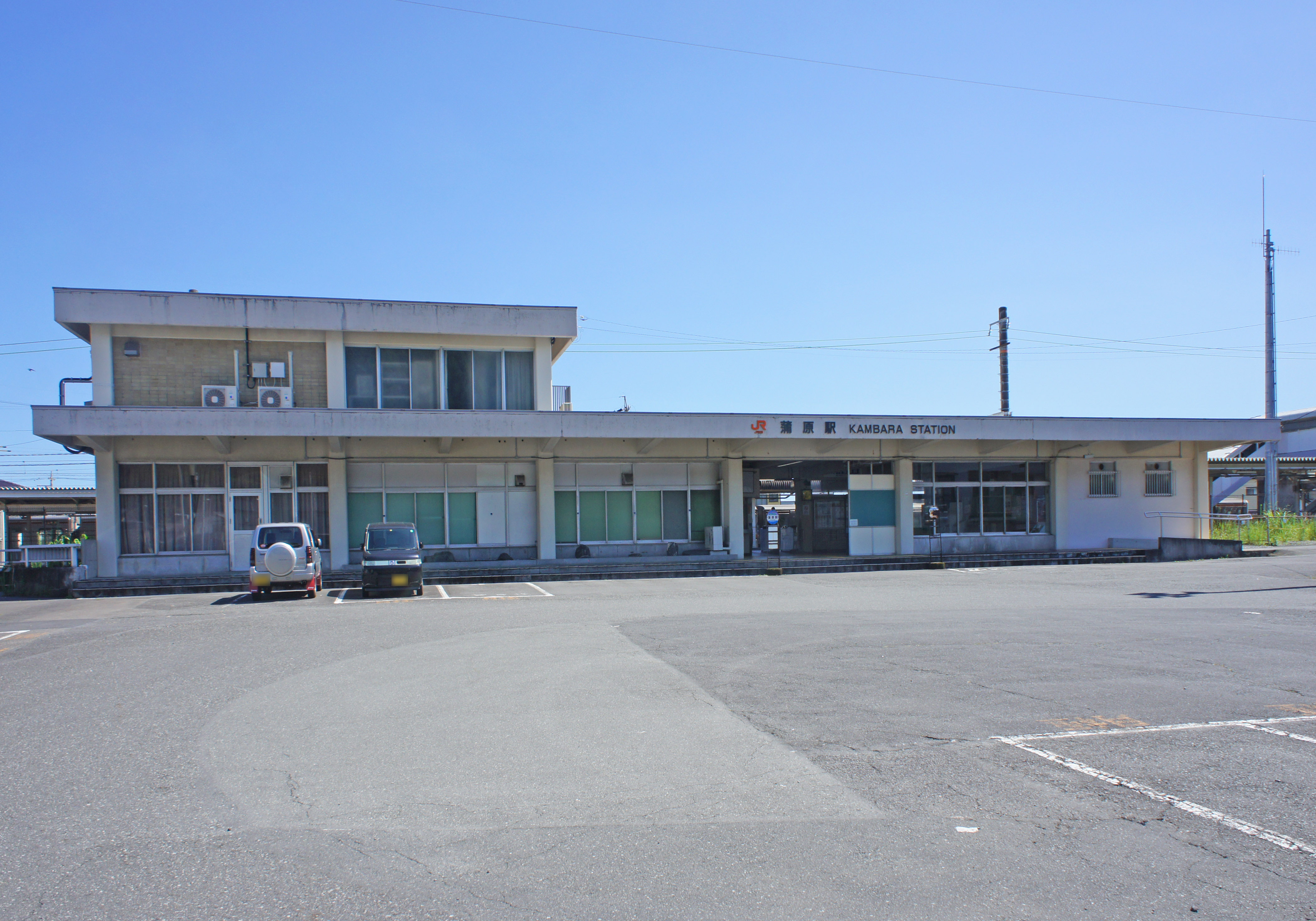
- Kambara Station in July 2022

General information
- Location: Kambara-Segizawa, Shimizu-ku, Shizuoka-shi, Shizuoka-ken; Japan
- Coordinates: 35°6′51″N 138°34′59″E
- Operator: JR Central
- Line: Tokaido Main Line
- Distance: 154.9 kilometers from Tokyo
- Platforms: 1 island + 1 side platform
- Tracks: 3

Construction
- Structure type: Ground level

Other information
- Status: Staffed
- Station code: CA11

History
- Opened: May 16, 1890

Passengers
- FY2017: 725 daily
Location
- Location within Shizuoka Prefecture Location within Japan

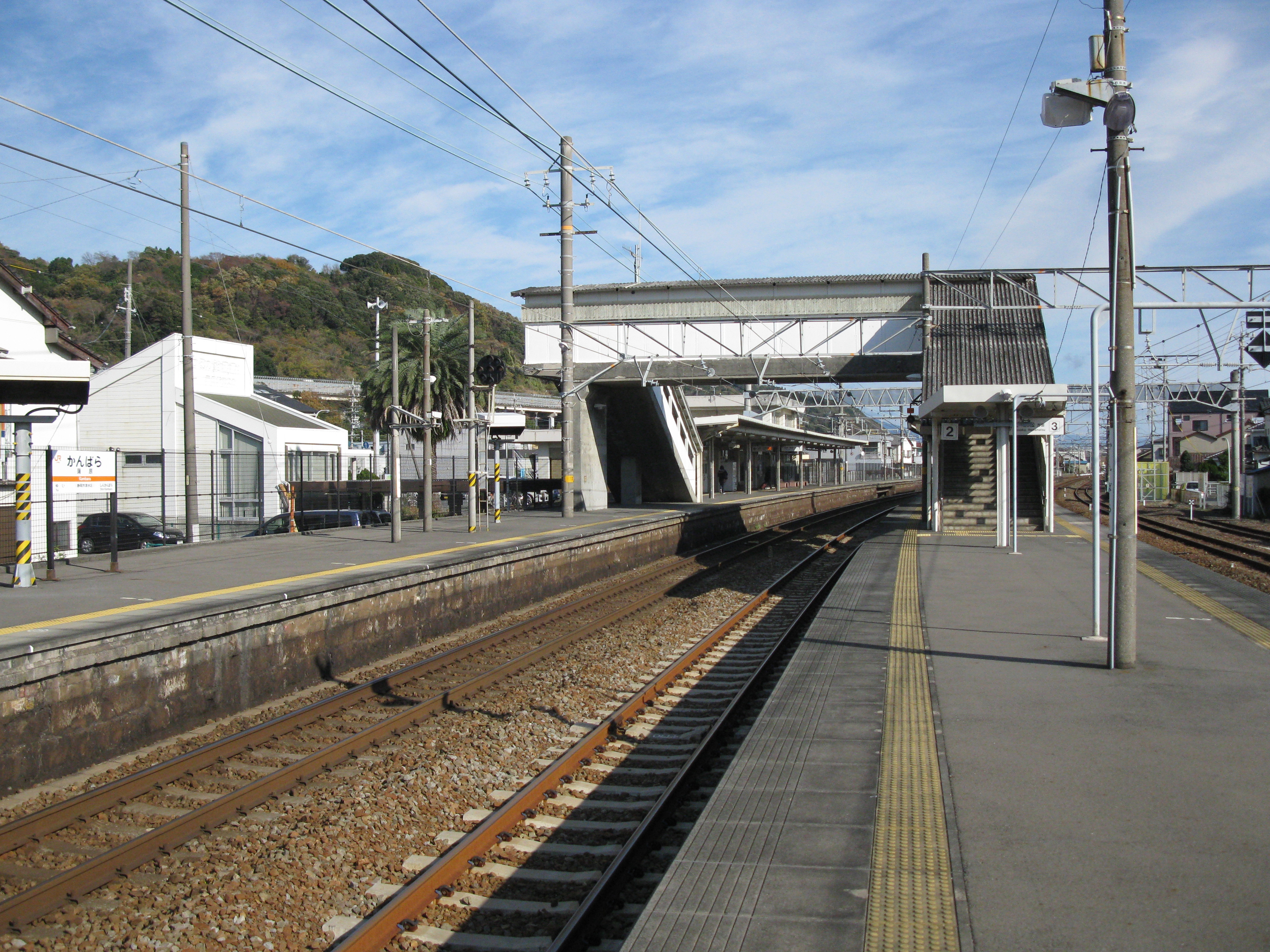
Platforms

Kambara Station (蒲原駅, Kambara-eki) is a railway station in Shimizu-ku, Shizuoka City, Shizuoka Prefecture, Japan, operated by Central Japan Railway Company (JR Tōkai).

== Lines ==
Kambara Station is served by the Tōkaidō Main Line, and is located 154.9 kilometers from the starting point of the line at Tokyo Station.

== Station layout ==
The station has a single side platform serving Track 1 and an island platform serving Track 2 and Track 3, connected to the station building by an overpass. Track 2 is used for through transit of express trains, as is Track 4 (without platform) to the outside of Track 3. The station building has automated ticket machines, TOICA automated turnstiles and a staffed ticket office.

=== Platforms ===
1	■ Tōkaidō Main Line	For Fuji・Numazu・Mishima・Atami
2	■ Tōkaidō Main Line	For express trains
3	■ Tōkaidō Main Line	For Shimizu・Shizuoka・Hamamatsu

== Adjacent stations ==
«	Service	»
Central Japan Railway Company
Tōkaidō Main Line
Rapid: Does not stop at this station
Commuter Rapid: Does not stop at this station
Limited Express Fujikawa: Does not stop at this station
Sleeper Limited Express Sunrise Izumo: Does not stop at this station
Sleeper Limited Express Sunrise Seto: Does not stop at this station
Shin-Kambara	Local	Yui

== Station history ==
When the section of the Tōkaidō Main Line connecting Shizuoka with Kōzu was completed in 1889, the initial plan was to construct stations in accord with the traditional 53 stages of the Tokaido road. However, in between Yoshiwara-juku and Kanbara-juku there was a traditionally unnumbered intermediary post station where a branch road led to the pilgrimage location of Mount Minobu. It was decided to build a railroad station at this location, and to bypass nearby Kambara Town instead. This led to a predictable uproar from Kambara, so Kambara Station was built a year later, but at an inconvenient distance outside of town, so as to keep the spacing between stations fairly even. A station in the middle of Kambara Town was not actually built until Shin-Kambara Station in 1968. Regularly scheduled freight services were discontinued in 1972, and all freight services by 1985.

Station numbering was introduced to the section of the Tōkaidō Line operated JR Central in March 2018; Kambara Station was assigned station number CA11.

== Passenger statistics ==
In fiscal 2017, the station was used by an average of 725 passengers daily (boarding passengers only).

== Surrounding area ==
- former Kambara Town Hall

== See also ==
- List of railway stations in Japan
