= Yui Station =

Railway station in Shizuoka, Japan

CA12 Yui Station 由比駅
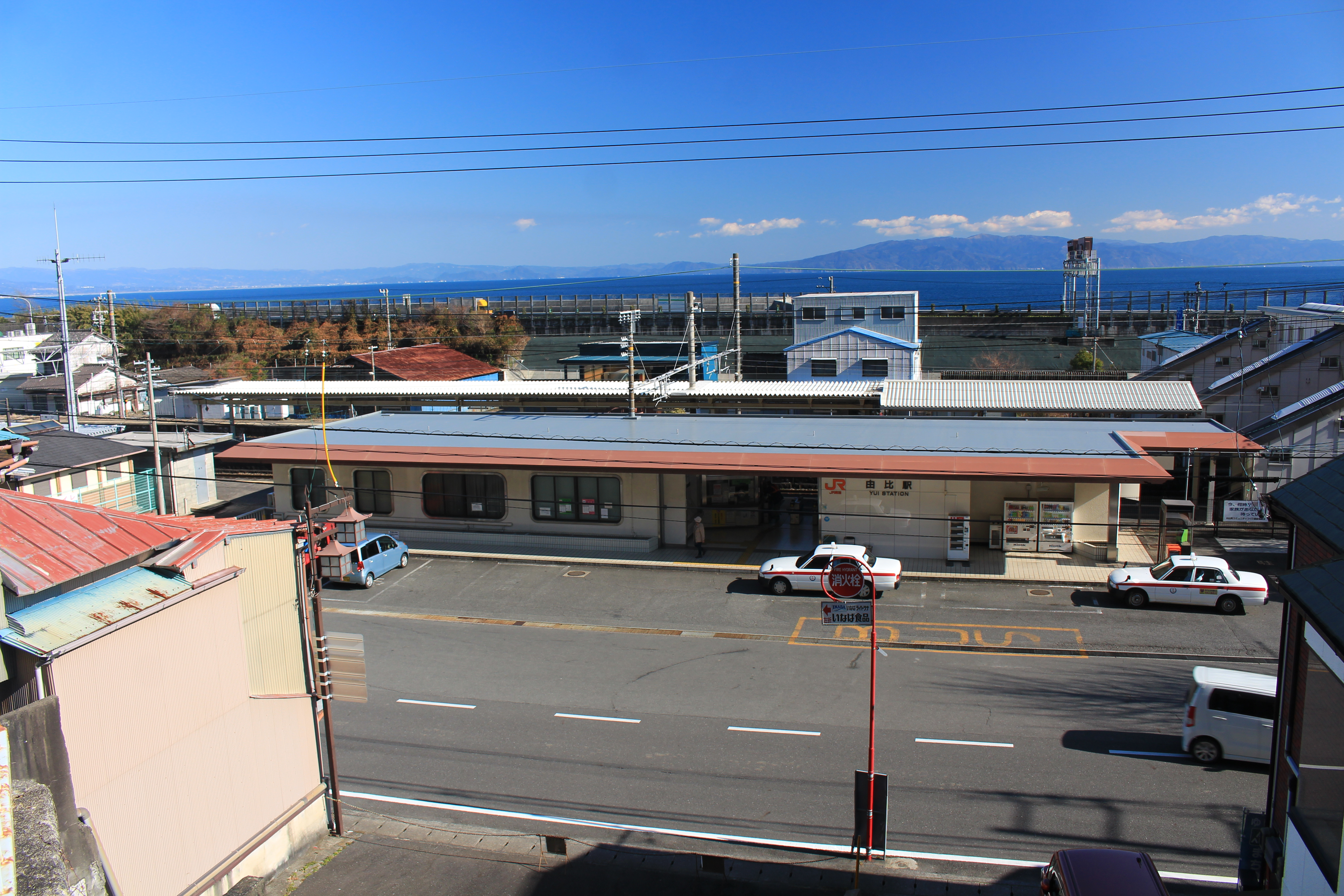
- JR Yui Station, February 2016

General information
- Location: Yui-Imajuku, Shimizu-ku, Shizuoka-shi, Shizuoka-ken; Japan
- Coordinates: 35°5′50″N 138°33′10″E
- Operator: JR Central
- Line: Tokaido Main Line
- Distance: 158.4 kilometers from Tokyo
- Platforms: 1 island + 2 side platforms
- Tracks: 4

Other information
- Status: Staffed
- Station code: CA12
- Website: Official website

History
- Opened: April 15, 1916

Passengers
- FY2017: 1,587 daily
Location
- Location within Shizuoka Prefecture Location within Japan

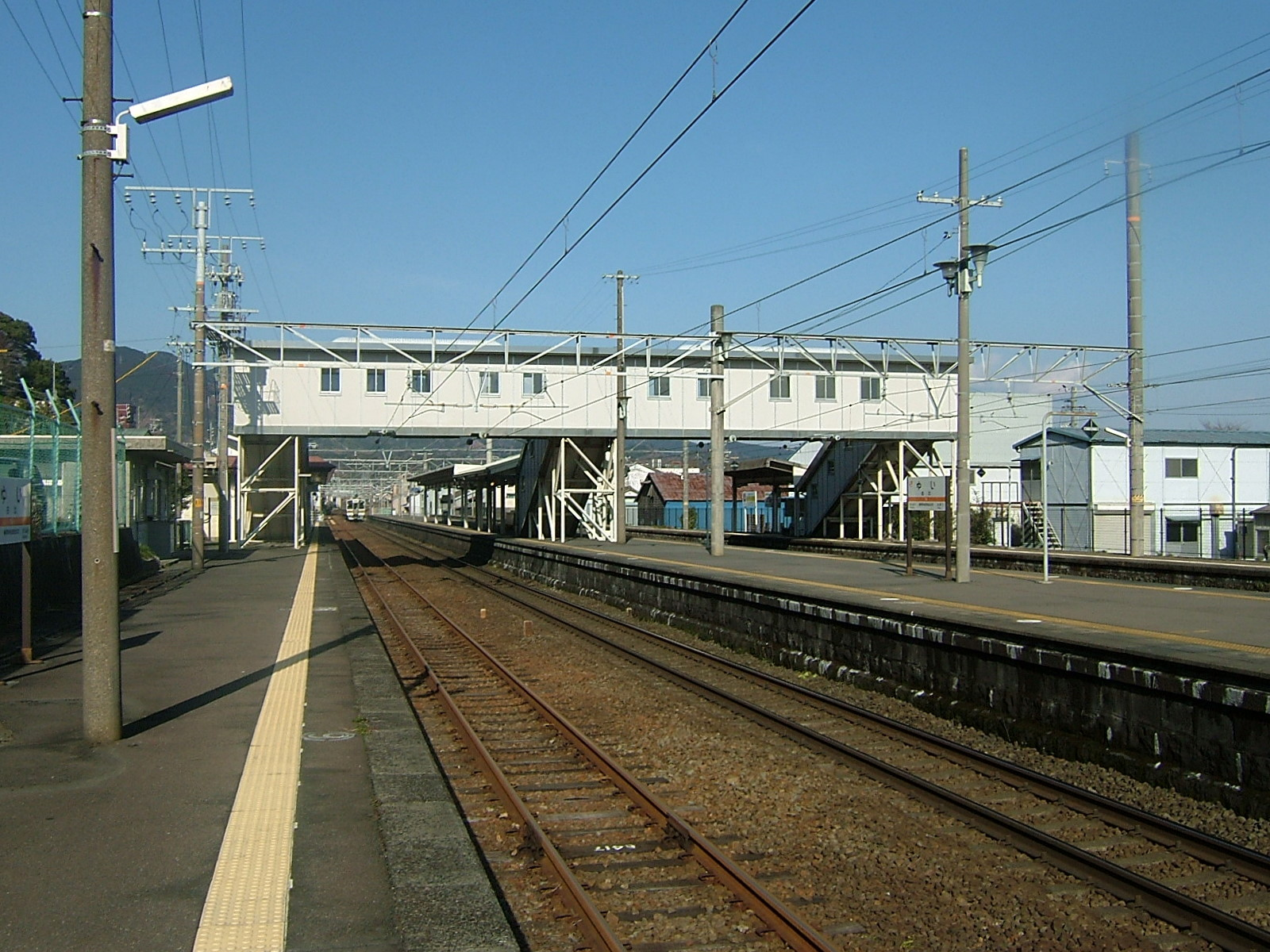
Platforms

Yui Station (由比駅, Yui eki) is a railway station in Shimizu-ku, Shizuoka City, Shizuoka Prefecture, Japan, operated by Central Japan Railway Company (JR Tōkai).

== Lines ==
Yui Station is served by the Tōkaidō Main Line, located 158.4 kilometers from the starting point of the line at Tokyo Station.

== Station layout ==
The station has two side platforms serving Track 1 and Track 4, and an island platform between them serving Track 2 and Track 3. The platforms are connected to the station building by a footbridge. Track 1 and Track 4 are used only during peak hours for express trains to pass. The station building has automated ticket machines, TOICA automated turnstiles and a staffed ticket office.

=== Platforms ===
1・2	■ Tōkaidō Main Line	For Fuji・Numazu・Mishima・Atami
3・4	■ Tōkaidō Main Line	For Shimizu・Shizuoka・Hamamatsu

== Adjacent stations ==
«	Service	»
Central Japan Railway Company
Tōkaidō Main Line
Rapid: Does not stop at this station
Commuter Rapid: Does not stop at this station
Limited Express Fujikawa: Does not stop at this station
Sleeper Limited Express Sunrise Izumo: Does not stop at this station
Sleeper Limited Express Sunrise Seto: Does not stop at this station
Kambara	Local	Okitsu

== Station history ==
Although local residents had petitioned for a station when the section of the Tōkaidō Main Line connecting Shizuoka with Hamamatsu was completed. Yui Station was opened in 1889, the low population and proximity to Kambara Station led to the petition being rejected. However, with the growing importance of agricultural products (green tea, mikan) and Yui's importance as a fishing port, the request for a station was finally granted on April 15, 1916. Regularly scheduled freight service was discontinued in 1971.

Station numbering was introduced to the section of the Tōkaidō Line operated JR Central in March 2018; Yui Station was assigned station number CA12.

== Passenger statistics ==
In fiscal 2017, the station was used by an average of 1,587 passengers daily (boarding passengers only).

== Surrounding area ==
- Japan National Route 1
- Tōmei Expressway
- Tōkaidō highway

== See also ==
- List of railway stations in Japan
