= Kitsunegasaki Station =

Railway station in Shizuoka, Japan

Kitsunegasaki Station 狐ヶ崎駅
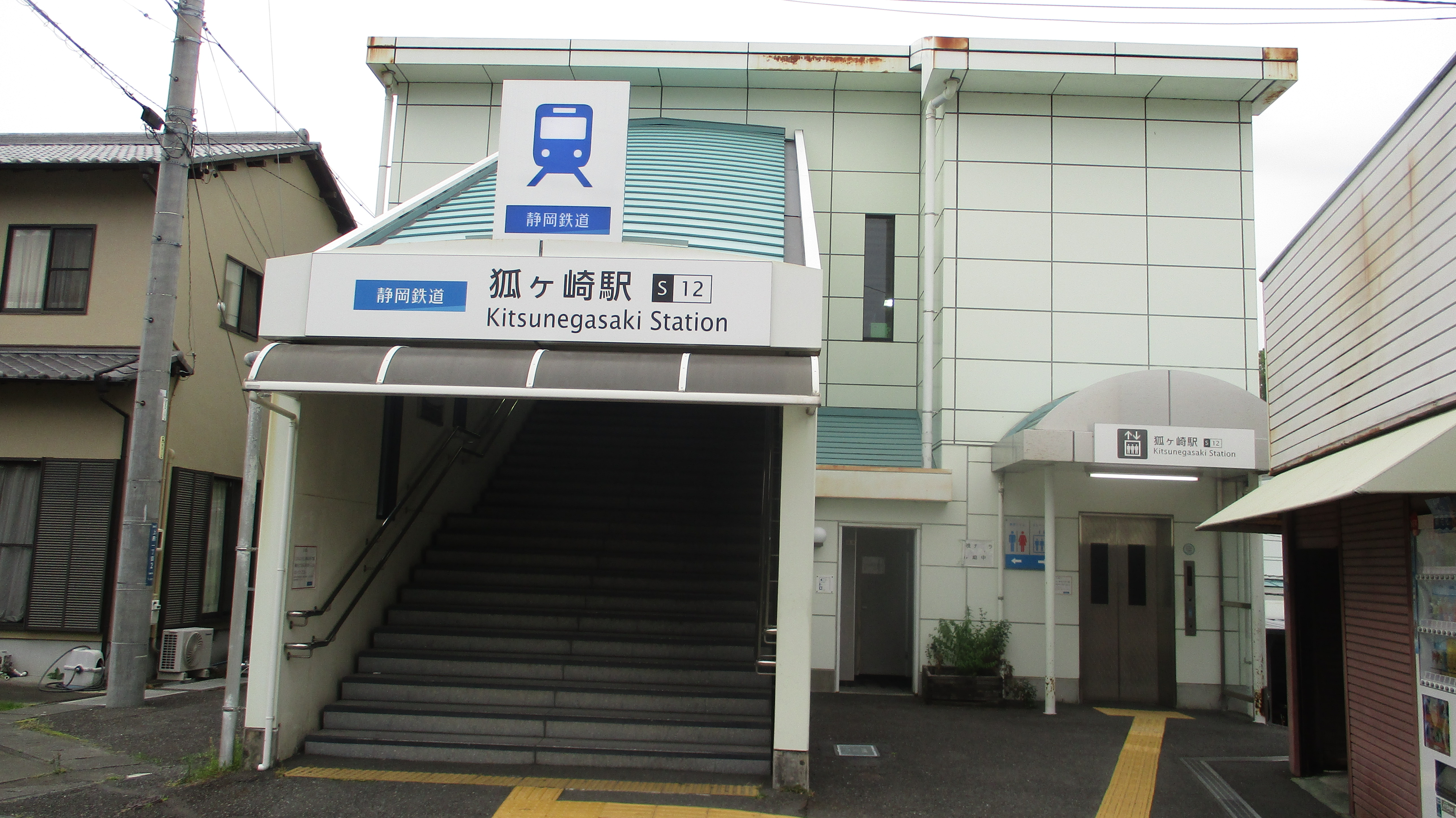
- Kitsunegasaki Station in June 2016

General information
- Location: Uehara 1-chome, Shimizu-ku, Shizuoka-shi, Shizuoka-ken; Japan
- Coordinates: 35.011443°N 138.459500°E
- Operator: Shizuoka Railway
- Line: ■ Shizuoka–Shimizu Line
- Distance: 8.3 km from Shin-Shizuoka
- Platforms: 1 island platform

Other information
- Station code: S12

History
- Opened: December 9, 1908
- Former names: Uehara (to 1927); Yuenmae (to 1944); Kitsunegasaki (to 1968); Kitsunegasaki Yangu-randomae (to 1985)

Passengers
- FY2017: 2657 (daily)

Services
Preceding station	Shizuoka Railway	Following station
Mikadodai towards Shin-Shizuoka	Shizuoka–Shimizu Line Commuter Express	Sakurabashi One-way operation
Mikadodai One-way operation	Shizuoka–Shimizu Line Express	Sakurabashi towards Shin-Shimizu
Mikadodai towards Shin-Shizuoka	Shizuoka–Shimizu Line Local	Sakurabashi towards Shin-Shimizu
Location
- Location within Shizuoka Prefecture Location within Japan

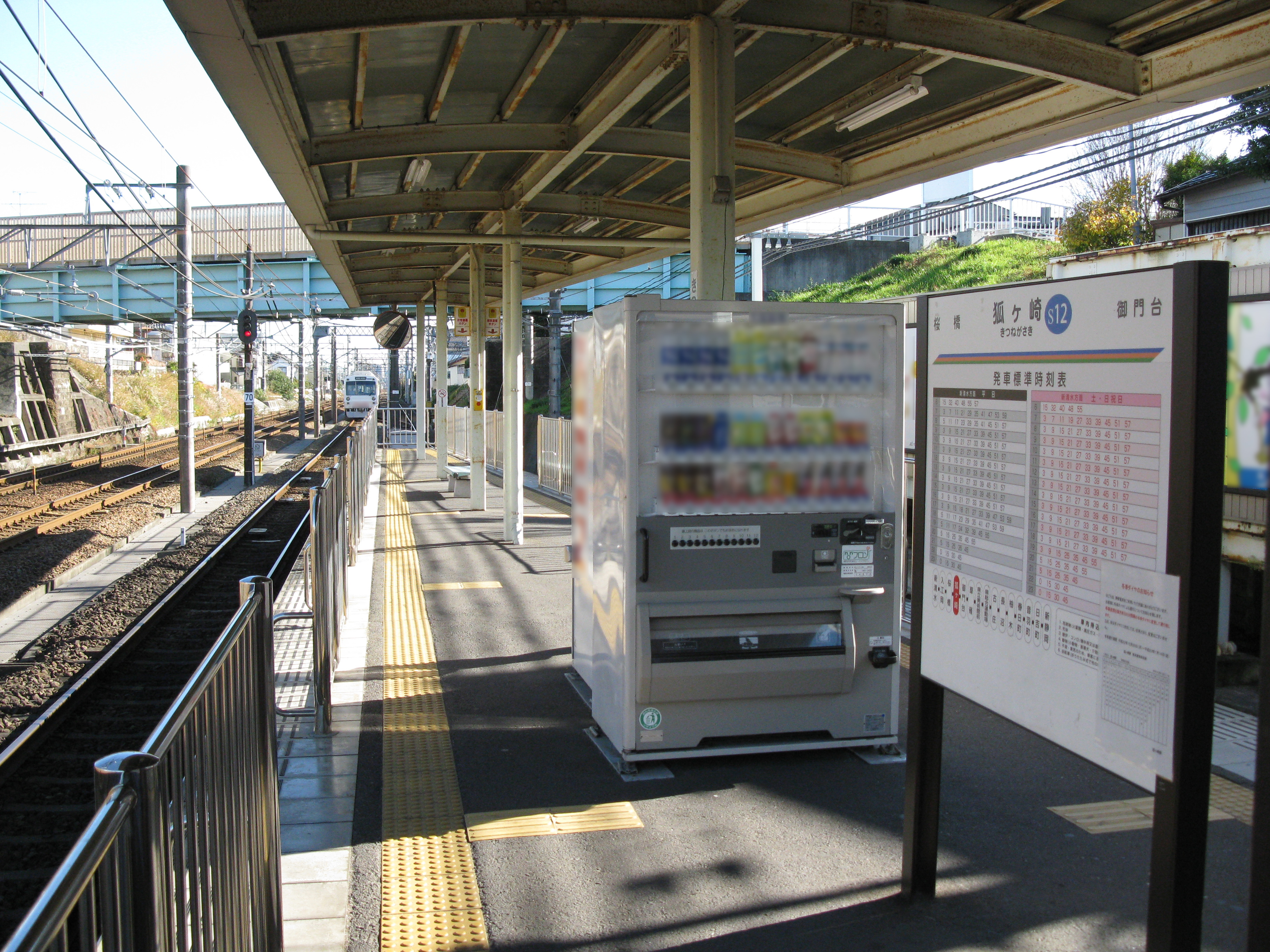
Platforms in 2010

Kitsunegasaki Station (狐ヶ崎駅, Kitsunegasaki-eki) is a railway station in Suruga-ku, Shizuoka, Shizuoka Prefecture, Japan, operated by the private railway company, Shizuoka Railway (Shizutetsu).

== Lines ==
Kitsunegasaki Station is a station on the Shizuoka–Shimizu Line and is 8.3 kilometers from the starting point of the line at Shin-Shizuoka Station.

== Station layout ==
The station has a single island platform. The station building is built above the west side of the platform, and has automated ticket machines, and automated turnstiles, which accept the LuLuCa smart card ticketing system as well as the PiTaPa and ICOCA IC cards. The station is wheelchair accessible.

=== Platforms ===
1	■ Shizuoka-Shimizu Line	for Sakurabashi and Shin-Shimizu
2	■ Shizuoka–Shimizu Line	for Kusanagi and Shin-Shizuoka

== Station history ==
Kitsunegasaki Station was established as Uehara Station (上原駅, Uehara-eki) on December 9, 1908. In 1926, the predecessor of the Kitsunegasaki Young Land Amusement Center opened, and in 1927 the Uehara Station was renamed Yuenmae Station (遊園前駅, Yuenmae-eki). The amusement part closed during World War II, and in 1944, Yuenmae Station was renamed as Kitsunegasaki Station. However, after the end of the war, the amusement park reopened, and as part of the promotional campaign created by Shizuoka Railway to boost the popularity of the park, the station name was changed from 1968 to Kitsunegasaki Yangu-randomae Station (頃 狐ヶ崎ヤングランド前駅, Yangu-randomae-eki). It reverted to the simpler name of Kitsunegasaki Station in 1985.

== Passenger statistics ==
In fiscal 2017, the station was used by an average of 2657 passengers daily (boarding passengers only).

== Surrounding area ==
- Kitsunegasaki Young Land

== See also ==
- List of railway stations in Japan
