= Yui-shuku =

Sixteenth of the 53 stations of the Tōkaidō in Japan

Coordinates: 35°05′29″N 138°32′55″E

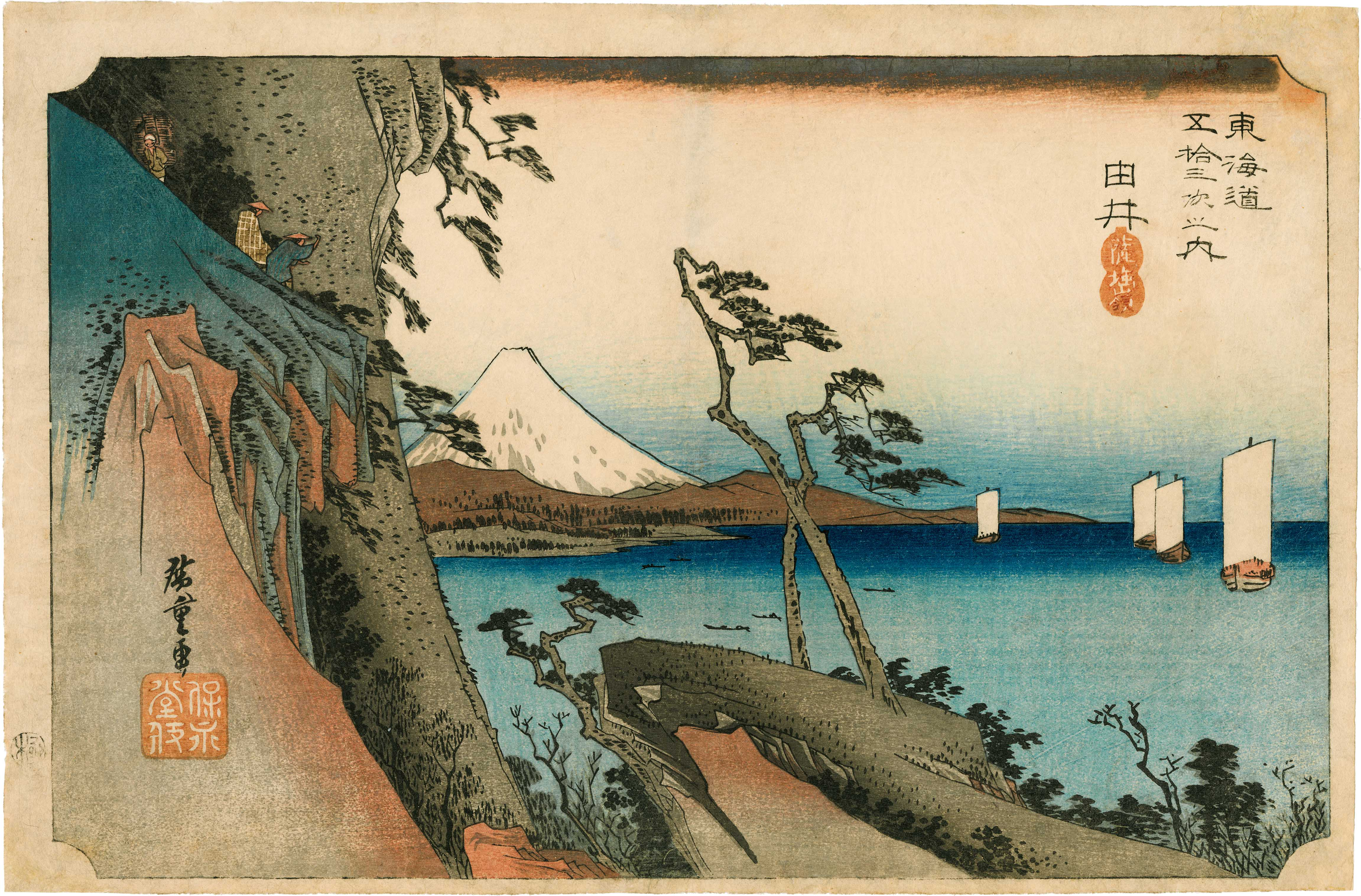
Yui-shuku in the 1830s, as depicted by Hiroshige in the Hōeidō edition of The Fifty-three Stations of the Tōkaidō (1831–1834)

Yui-shuku (由比宿, Yui-shuku) was the sixteenth of the fifty-three stations of the Tōkaidō. It is located in the Shimizu-ku area of Shizuoka, Shizuoka Prefecture, Japan. It is one of four former post stations located in Shimizu-ku.

== Area information ==
At the Tōkaidō Yui-shuku Omoshiro Shukubakan, visitors can experience various aspects of life in the Edo period shukuba, ranging from schooling and lodging, to working and socializing.

The area is known for its sakura ebi, a type of small shrimp.

In the classic ukiyo-e print by Andō Hiroshige (Hōeidō edition) from 1831–1834, Hiroshige chose not to depict the post station at all, but instead shows travelers climbing a very steep mountain pass.

== Neighboring post towns ==
Tōkaidō
Kanbara-juku - Yui-shuku - Okitsu-juku
