= Sakurabashi Station (Shizuoka) =

Railway station in Shizuoka, Japan

Sakurabashi Station 桜橋駅
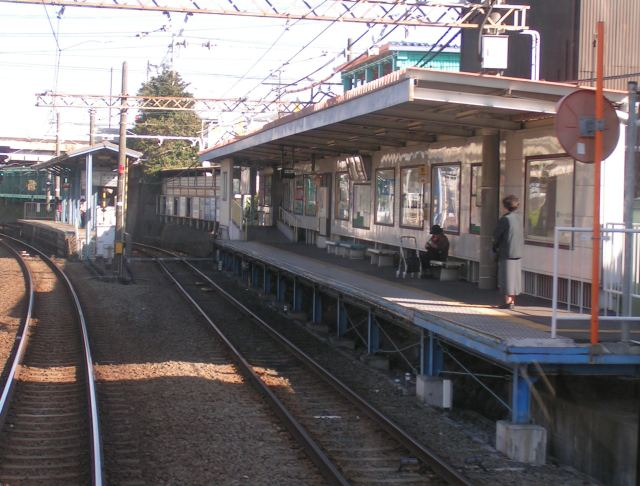
- Sakurabashi platforms, showing offset

General information
- Location: Kasuga 1-chōme, Shimizu-ku, Shizuoka-shi, Shizuoka-ken; Japan
- Coordinates: 35.013043°N 138.477572°E
- Operator: Shizuoka Railway
- Line: ■ Shizuoka–Shimizu Line
- Distance: 10.0km from Shin-Shizuoka
- Platforms: 2 side platforms

Other information
- Station code: S13

History
- Opened: December 9, 1908

Passengers
- FY2017: 2300 (daily)

Services
Preceding station	Shizuoka Railway	Following station
Kitsunegasaki towards Shin-Shizuoka	Shizuoka–Shimizu Line Commuter Express	Shin-Shimizu One-way operation
Kitsunegasaki One-way operation	Shizuoka–Shimizu Line Express	Shin-Shimizu Terminus
Kitsunegasaki towards Shin-Shizuoka	Shizuoka–Shimizu Line Local	Irieoka towards Shin-Shimizu
Location
- Location within Shizuoka Prefecture Location within Japan

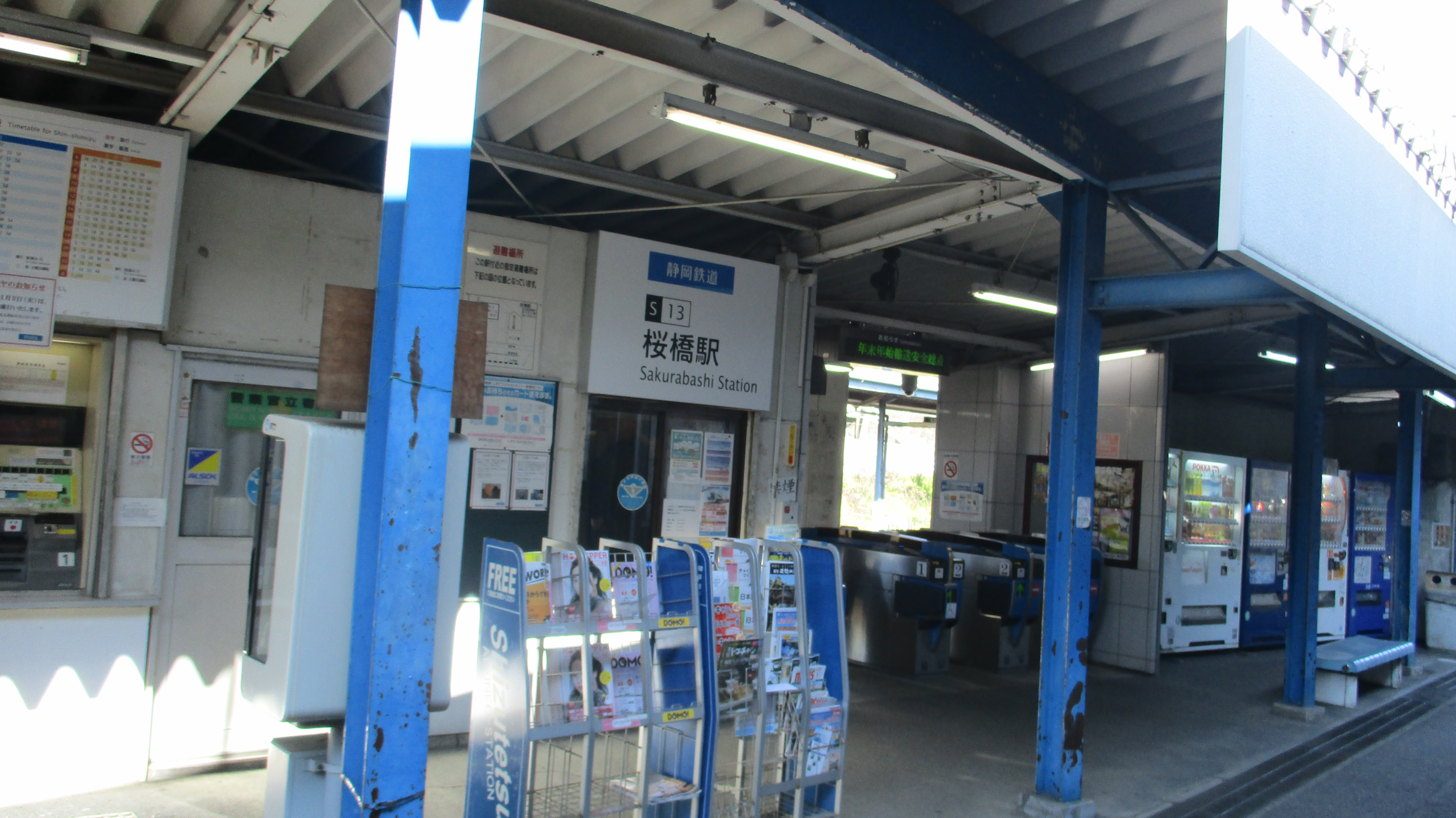
Station entrance (January 2017)

Sakurabashi Station (桜橋駅, Sakurabashi-eki) is a railway station in Suruga-ku, Shizuoka, Shizuoka Prefecture, Japan, operated by the private railway company, Shizuoka Railway (Shizutetsu).

== Lines ==
Sakurabashi Station is a station on the Shizuoka–Shimizu Line and is 10.0 kilometers from the starting point of the line at Shin-Shizuoka Station.

== Station layout ==
The station has two parallel side platforms, which are offset from each other, with a level crossing connecting the two platforms. The station entrance is located in between the platforms towards the south. and has automated ticket machines, and automated turnstiles, which accept the LuLuCa smart card ticketing system as well as the PiTaPa and ICOCA IC cards. The station is wheelchair accessible only in the Shin-Shizuoka direction, as access to the other platform is only via stairs.

=== Platforms ===
1	■ Shizuoka-Shimizu Line	for Shin-Shimizu
2	■ Shizuoka–Shimizu Line	for Kusanagi and Shin-Shizuoka

== Station history ==
Sakurabashi Station was established on December 9, 1908.

== Passenger statistics ==
In fiscal 2017, the station was used by an average of 2300 passengers daily (boarding passengers only).

== Surrounding area ==
- Sakuragaoka High School

== See also ==
- List of railway stations in Japan
