= Kanbara-juku =

Fifteenth of the 53 stations of the Tōkaidō in Japan

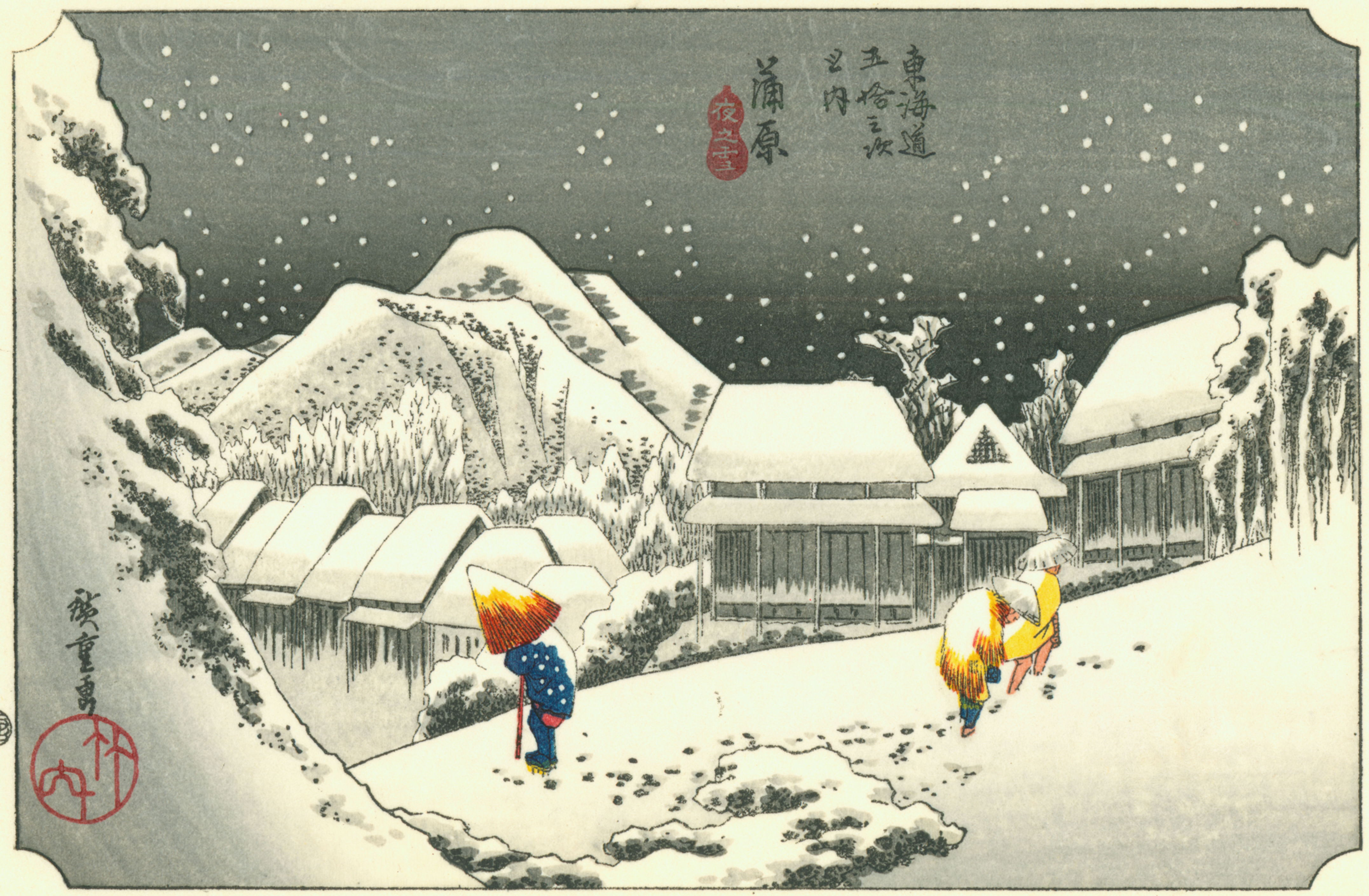
Kanbara-juku in the 1830s, as depicted by Hiroshige in the Hōeidō edition of The Fifty-three Stations of the Tōkaidō (1831–1834)

Kanbara-juku (蒲原宿, Kanbara-juku) was the fifteenth of the fifty-three stations of the Tōkaidō. It is located in what is now part of the Shimizu-ku ward of Shizuoka, Shizuoka Prefecture, Japan. It is one of four former post stations located in Shimizu-ku.

== History ==
The original Kanbara-juku was decimated by a flood in the early part of the Edo period, and was rebuilt shortly thereafter.

The classic ukiyo-e print by Andō Hiroshige (Hōeidō edition) from 1831–1834, depicts a mountain village at nightfall, through which three people are struggling under deep snow. It is a rather strange composition, as Kanbara is located in a very temperate area warmed by the Kuroshio current offshore, and even a light snowfall is extremely rare.

In Japan (as elsewhere), many villages in different parts of the country have the same name. Hiroshige apparently often relied on existing prints and guidebooks. It seems likely that he mistakenly used an image of a different Kanbara: a village in the mountainous Gunma prefecture.

The Hiroshige print features on the cover of Weezer's 1996 album Pinkerton.

== Neighboring post towns ==
Tōkaidō
Yoshiwara-juku - Kanbara-juku - Yui-shuku
