= List of railway stations in Japan: K-L =

List of railway stations in Japan

A	B	C	D	E	F	G	H	I	J	KL	M	N	O	P	R	S	T	U	W	Y	Z

This list shows the railway stations in Japan that begin with the letter K or L. This is a subset of the full list of railway stations in Japan.

== Station list ==
=== Ka ===
Kabaike Station	蒲池駅 (愛知県)（かばいけ）
Kabatake Station	神畑駅（かばたけ）
Kabe Station (Hiroshima)	可部駅（かべ）
Kabe Station (Tokyo)	河辺駅（かべ）
Kabuto Station (Fukushima)	兜駅（かぶと）
Kabuto Station (Mie)	加太駅 (三重県)（かぶと）
Kabutonuma Station	兜沼駅（かぶとぬま）
Kabutoyama Station	かぶと山駅（かぶとやま）
Kachidoki Station	勝どき駅（かちどき）
Kachigawa Station	勝川駅（かちがわ）
Kada Station	加太駅 (和歌山県)（かだ）
Kado Station	鹿渡駅（かど）
Kadode Station	門出駅（かどで）
Kadogawa Station	門川駅（かどがわ）
Kadohara Station	勝原駅（かどはら）
Kadomaminami Station	門真南駅（かどまみなみ）
Kadomashi Station	門真市駅（かどまし）
Kadomatsu Station	門松駅（かどまつ）
Kadonohama Station	角の浜駅（かどのはま）
Kadosawabashi Station	門沢橋駅（かどさわばし）
Kadoshima Station	門島駅（かどしま）
Kaesa Station	替佐駅（かえさ）
Kafuri Station	加布里駅（かふり）
Kaga-Kasama Station	加賀笠間駅（かがかさま）
Kagami Station	香我美駅（かがみ）
Kagamigahara Station	各務ヶ原駅（かがみがはら）
Kagamigawabashi Station	鏡川橋駅（かがみがわばし）
Kagamiishi Station	鏡石駅（かがみいし）
Kagaonsen Station	加賀温泉駅（かがおんせん）
Kagato Station	香登駅（かがと）
Kagatsume Station	蚊爪駅（かがつめ）
Kagawa Station (Yamaguchi)	嘉川駅（かがわ）
Kagawa Station (Kanagawa)	香川駅（かがわ）
Kagemori Station	影森駅（かげもり）
Kageno Station	影野駅（かげの）
Kagetsu-sōjiji Station	花月総持寺駅（かげつそうじじ）
Kagiya-nakanoike Station	加木屋中ノ池駅（かぎやなかのいけ）
Kagohara Station	籠原駅（かごはら）
Kagoshima Station	鹿児島駅（かごしま）
Kagoshima-chūō Station	鹿児島中央駅（かごしまちゅうおう）
Kagoshima-eki-mae Station	鹿児島駅前駅（かごしまえきまえ）
Kaguraoka Station	神楽岡駅（かぐらおか）
Kagurazaka Station	神楽坂駅（かぐらざか）
Kaguyama Station	香久山駅（かぐやま）
Kaibara Station	柏原駅 (兵庫県)（かいばら）
Kaida Station	貝田駅（かいだ）
Kaifu Station	海部駅（かいふ）
Kaigan-dōri Station	海岸通駅（かいがんどおり）
Kaiganji Station	海岸寺駅（かいがんじ）
Kaihimmakuhari Station	海浜幕張駅（かいひんまくはり）
Kaihotsu Station	開発駅（かいほつ）
Kai-Iwama Station	甲斐岩間駅（かいいわま）
Kaiji Station	海路駅（かいじ）
Kaijin Station	海神駅（かいじん）
Kai-Koizumi Station	甲斐小泉駅（かいこいずみ）
Kaikonoyashiro Station	蚕ノ社駅（かいこのやしろ）
Kaimei Station	開明駅（かいめい）
Kaimon Station	開聞駅（かいもん）
Kaina Station	荷稲駅（かいな）
Kainan Station	海南駅（かいなん）
Kai-Ōizumi Station	甲斐大泉駅（かいおおいずみ）
Kai-Ōshima Station	甲斐大島駅（かいおおしま）
Kairakuen Station	偕楽園駅（かいらくえん）
Kaisei Station	開成駅（かいせい）
Kai-Sumiyoshi Station	甲斐住吉駅（かいすみよし）
Kaitaichi Station	海田市駅（かいたいち）
Kai-Tokiwa Station	甲斐常葉駅（かいときわ）
Kai-Ueno Station	甲斐上野駅（かいうえの）
Kai-Yamato Station	甲斐大和駅（かいやまと）
Kaizaki Station	海崎駅（かいざき）
Kaize Station (Nagano)	海瀬駅（かいぜ）
Kaize Station (Nagasaki)	皆瀬駅（かいぜ）
Kaizu Station	貝津駅（かいづ）
Kaizuka Station (Fukuoka)	貝塚駅 (福岡県)（かいづか）
Kaizuka Station (Osaka)	貝塚駅 (大阪府)（かいづか）
Kaizuka Shiyakushomae Station	貝塚市役所前駅（かいづかしやくしょまえ）
Kaji Station	加治駅（かじ）
Kajigaya Station	梶が谷駅（かじがや）
Kajigaya Kamotsu Terminal Station	梶ヶ谷貨物ターミナル駅（かじがやかもつたーみなる）
Kajikazawaguchi Station	鰍沢口駅（かじかざわぐち）
Kajiki Station	加治木駅（かじき）
Kajikuri-Gōdaichi Station	梶栗郷台地駅（かじくりごうだいち）
Kajita Station	梶田駅（かじた）
Kajiwara Station	梶原駅（かじわら）
Kajiyashiki Station	梶屋敷駅（かじやしき）
Kakamigahara-shiyakusho-mae Station	各務原市役所前駅（かかみがはらしやくしょまえ）
Kakarima Station	掛澗駅（かかりま）
Kakegawa Station	掛川駅（かけがわ）
Kakegawa-shiyakusho-mae Station	掛川市役所前駅（かけがわしやくしょまえ）
Kakeyama Station	佳景山駅（かけやま）
Kakidaira Station	柿平駅（かきだいら）
Kakigashima Station	柿ヶ島駅（かきがしま）
Kakinoki Station	柿ノ木駅（かきのき）
Kakio Station	柿生駅（かきお）
Kakishitaonsenguchi Station	柿下温泉口駅（かきしたおんせんぐち）
Kakizaki Station	柿崎駅（かきざき）
Kakogawa Station	加古川駅（かこがわ）
Kaku Station	賀来駅（かく）
Kakuda Station	角田駅（かくだ）
Kakumodani Station	角茂谷駅（かくもだに）
Kakunodate Station	角館駅（かくのだて）
Kakuōzan Station	覚王山駅（かくおうざん）
Kamabuchi Station	釜淵駅（かまぶち）
Kamachi Station	蒲池駅 (福岡県)（かまち）
Kamado Station	釜戸駅（かまど）
Kamagafuchi Station	釜ヶ淵駅（かまがふち）
Kamagaya Station	鎌ヶ谷駅（かまがや）
Kamagayadaibutsu Station	鎌ヶ谷大仏駅（かまがやだいぶつ）
Kamaishi Station	釜石駅（かまいし）
Kamakura Station	鎌倉駅（かまくら）
Kamakurakōkō-mae Station	鎌倉高校前駅（かまくらこうこうまえ）
Kamanohana Station	釜ノ鼻駅（かまのはな）
Kamase Station	鎌瀬駅（かませ）
Kamasusaka Station	蒲須坂駅（かますさか）
Kamata Station (Tokyo)	蒲田駅（かまた）
Kamata Station (Ehime)	鎌田駅（かまた）
Kamate Station	鎌手駅（かまて）
Kamatori Station	鎌取駅（かまとり）
Kamaya Station	釜谷駅（かまや）
Kamayama Station	竈山駅（かまやま）
Kambara Station	蒲原駅（かんばら）
Kambe Station	神戸駅 (愛知県)（かんべ）
Kameari Station	亀有駅（かめあり）
Kameda Station	亀田駅（かめだ）
Kamedake Station	亀嵩駅（かめだけ）
Kamegawa Station	亀川駅（かめがわ）
Kamei Station	亀井駅（かめい）
Kameido Station	亀戸駅（かめいど）
Kameidosuijin Station	亀戸水神駅（かめいどすいじん）
Kamejima Station	亀島駅（かめじま）
Kamenokō Station	亀甲駅（かめのこう）
Kameoka Station	亀岡駅（かめおか）
Kameyama Station (Hyogo)	亀山駅 (兵庫県)（かめやま）
Kameyama Station (Mie)	亀山駅 (三重県)（かめやま）
Kamezaki Station	亀崎駅（かめざき）
Kami Station	加美駅（かみ）
Kami-Ainoura Station	上相浦駅（かみあいのうら）
Kami-Arisu Station	上有住駅（かみありす）
Kami-Arita Station	上有田駅（かみありた）
Kami-Ashibetsu Station	上芦別駅（かみあしべつ）
Kami-Asō Station	上麻生駅（かみあそう）
Kami-Atsunai Station	上厚内駅（かみあつない）
Kamidaki Station	上滝駅（かみだき）
Kami-Fukawa Station	上深川駅（かみふかわ）
Kami-Fukuoka Station	上福岡駅 （かみふくおか）
Kami-Furano Station	上富良野駅（かみふらの）
Kami-Futada Station	上二田駅（かみふただ）
Kamigōri Station	上郡駅（かみごおり）
Kamigō Station	上郷駅（かみごう）
Kami-Gōra Station	上強羅駅（かみごうら）
Kamihama Station	上浜駅（かみはま）
Kami-Hinokinai Station	上桧木内駅（かみひのきない）
Kami-Hobara Station	上保原駅（かみほばら）
Kami-Honami Station	上穂波駅（かみほなみ）
Kamihongō Station	上本郷駅（かみほんごう）
Kami-Hommachi Station	上本町停留場（かみほんまち）
Kamihori Station	上堀駅（かみほり）
Kami-Horomui Station	上幌向駅（かみほろむい）
Kami-Horonobe Station	上幌延駅（かみほろのべ）
Kami-Hoshikawa Station	上星川駅（かみほしかわ）
Kamiichi Station	上市駅（かみいち）
Kamiichiba Station	上市場駅（かみいちば）
Kamiichiman Station	上一万駅（かみいちまん）
Kami-Igusa Station	上井草駅（かみいぐさ）
Kamiiida Station	上飯田駅（かみいいだ）
Kami-Iijima Station	上飯島駅（かみいいじま）
Kami-Ijūin Station	上伊集院駅（かみいじゅういん）
Kami-Imai Station	上今井駅（かみいまい）
Kami-Imaichi Station	上今市駅（かみいまいち）
Kami-Imari Station	上伊万里駅（かみいまり）
Kamiiso Station	上磯駅（かみいそ）
Kami-Ita Station	上伊田駅（かみいた）
Kami-Itabashi Station	上板橋駅 （かみいたばし）
Kami-Iwami Station	上石見駅（かみいわみ）
Kamiizumi Station	上泉駅（かみいずみ）
Kamijō Station (Nagano)	上条駅 (長野県)（かみじょう）
Kamijō Station (Niigata)	上条駅 (新潟県)（かみじょう）
Kami-Kagawa Station	上嘉川駅（かみかがわ）
Kami-Kambai Station	上神梅駅（かみかんばい）
Kami-Kanada Station	上金田駅（かみかなだ）
Kami-Kasada Station	上笠田駅（かみかさだ）
Kami-Katagiri Station	上片桐駅（かみかたぎり）
Kami-Katsura Station	上桂駅（かみかつら）
Kamikawa Station	上川駅（かみかわ）
Kamikawaguchi Station	上川口駅 （かみかわぐち）
Kami-Kawatachi Station	上川立駅（かみかわたち）
Kamikitachō Station	上北町駅（かみきたちょう）
Kamikitadai Station	上北台駅（かみきただい）
Kami-Kitazawa Station	上北沢駅（かみきたざわ）
Kamikoma Station	上狛駅（かみこま）
Kami-Kosawa Station	上古沢駅（かみこさわ）
Kami-Kumagaya Station	上熊谷駅（かみくまがや）
Kami-Kumamoto Station	上熊本駅（かみくまもと）
Kami-Kuwanagawa Station	上桑名川駅（かみくわながわ）
Kamimachi Station	上町駅（かみまち）
Kamimaezu Station	上前津駅（かみまえづ）
Kami-Mamba Station	上万場駅（かみまんば）
Kami-Marubuchi Station	上丸渕駅（かみまるぶち）
Kami-Matsukawa Station	上松川駅（かみまつかわ）
Kami-Mio Station	上三緒駅（かみみお）
Kami-Mita Station	上三田駅（かみみた）
Kamimiyori-Shiobaraonsenguchi Station	上三依塩原温泉口駅（かみみよりしおばらおんせんぐち）
Kamimizo Station	上溝駅（かみみぞ）
Kamimoku Station	上牧駅 (群馬県)（かみもく）
Kami-Morioka Station	上盛岡駅（かみもりおか）
Kami-Moroe Station	上諸江駅（かみもろえ）
Kamimuragakuenmae Station	神村学園前駅（かみむらがくえんまえ）
Kami-Nagatoro Station	上長瀞駅（かみながとろ）
Kami-Nagaya Station	上永谷駅（かみながや）
Kaminaka Station	上中駅（かみなか）
Kami-Nakazato Station	上中里駅（かみなかざと）
Kaminobe Station	上野部駅（かみのべ）
Kaminochō Station	上の町駅（かみのちょう）
Kami-noge Station	上野毛駅（かみのげ）
Kaminogō Station	上之郷駅（かみのごう）
Kami-Nojiri Station	上野尻駅（かみのじり）
Kaminokuni Station	上ノ国駅（かみのくに）
Kaminoma Station	上野間駅（かみのま）
Kaminome Station	上野目駅（かみのめ）
Kami-Nopporo Station	上野幌駅（かみのっぽろ）
Kaminoshō Station	上ノ庄駅（かみのしょう）
Kaminotaishi Station	上ノ太子駅（かみのたいし）
Kaminoyama Onsen Station	かみのやま温泉駅（かみのやまおんせん）
Kamio Station	神尾駅（かみお）
Kami-Oboro Station	上尾幌駅（かみおぼろ）
Kami-Ogawa Station	上小川駅（かみおがわ）
Kamioka Station	上岡駅（かみおか）
Kami-Ōi Station	上大井駅（かみおおい）
Kami-Ōoka Station	上大岡駅（かみおおおか）
Kami-Ōtsuki Station	上大月駅（かみおおつき）
Kami-Otai Station	上小田井駅（かみおたい）
Kamisakaemachi Station	上栄町駅（かみさかえまち）
Kamisakai Station	上境駅（かみさかい）
Kamisawa Station (Aichi)	神沢駅（かみさわ）
Kamisawa Station (Hyōgo)	上沢駅（かみさわ）
Kami Sendai Station	上川内駅（かみせんだい）
Kami-Shakujii Station	上石神井駅（かみしゃくじい）
Kami-Shinjō Station	上新庄駅 （かみしんじょう）
Kami-Shirataki Station	上白滝駅（かみしらたき）
Kamishiro Station	神城駅（かみしろ）
Kami-Shishiori Station	上鹿折駅（かみししおり）
Kamisu Station	神栖駅（かみす）
Kami-Sugaya Station	上菅谷駅（かみすがや）
Kamisuge Station	上菅駅（かみすげ）
Kamisugi Station (Akita)	上杉駅（かみすぎ）
Kamisugi Station (Hiroshima)	神杉駅（かみすぎ）
Kami-Suwa Station	上諏訪駅（かみすわ）
Kami Tanoura Station	上田浦駅（かみたのうら）
Kamitobaguchi Station	上鳥羽口駅（かみとばぐち）
Kamitode Station	上戸手駅（かみとで）
Kamitokoro Station	上所駅（かみところ）
Kami-Toyota Station	上豊田駅（かみとよた）
Kamiura Station	上浦駅（かみうら）
Kami-Usuki Station	上臼杵駅（かみうすき）
Kami-Uwa Station	上宇和駅（かみうわ）
Kami-Wakuya Station	上涌谷駅（かみわくや）
Kamiya Station	神谷駅（かみや）
Kamiyachō Station	神谷町駅（かみやちょう）
Kami-Yagi Station	上八木駅（かみやぎ）
Kami-Yakuno Station	上夜久野駅（かみやくの）
Kamiya-chō-higashi Station	紙屋町東駅（かみやちょうひがし）
Kamiya-chō-nishi Station	紙屋町西駅（かみやちょうにし）
Kamiyama Station	神山駅（かみやま）
Kami-Yamaguchi Station	上山口駅（かみやまぐち）
Kamiyashiro Station	上社駅（かみやしろ）
Kamiyasu Station	上安駅（かみやす）
Kami-Yokosuka Station	上横須賀駅（かみよこすか）
Kami-Yonai Station	上米内駅（かみよない）
Kami-Yuzawa Station	上湯沢駅（かみゆざわ）
Kammaki Station	上牧駅 (大阪府)（かんまき）
Kamo Station (Fukuoka)	賀茂駅（かも）
Kamo Station (Kyoto)	加茂駅 (京都府)（かも）
Kamo Station (Mie)	加茂駅 (三重県)（かも）
Kamo Station (Niigata)	加茂駅 (新潟県)（かも）
Kamogata Station	鴨方駅（かもがた）
Kamogawa Station	鴨川駅（かもがわ）
Kamogō Station	加茂郷駅（かもごう）
Kamoi Station	鴨居駅（かもい）
Kamojima Station	鴨島駅（かもじま）
Kamonaka Station	加茂中駅（かもなか）
Kamono Station	加茂野駅（かもの）
Kamonomiya Station (Saitama)	加茂宮駅（かものみや）
Kamonomiya Station (Kanagawa)	鴨宮駅（かものみや）
Kamuriki Station	冠着駅（かむりき）
Kamuro Station	学文路駅（かむろ）
Kan'onji Station	観音寺駅 (香川県)（かんおんじ）
Kanada Station	金田駅（かなだ）
Kanae Station	鼎駅（かなえ）
Kanagawa Station (Okayama)	金川駅（かながわ）
Kanagawa Station (Kanagawa)	神奈川駅（かながわ）
Kanagawa-Shinmachi Station	神奈川新町駅（かながわしんまち）
Kanagi Station	金木駅（かなぎ）
Kanahashi Station	金橋駅（かなはし）
Kanaishihara Station	金石原駅（かないしはら）
Kanamachi Station	金町駅（かなまち）
Kanamechō Station	要町駅（かなめちょう）
Kanameta Station	要田駅（かなめた）
Kanasashi Station	金指駅（かなさし）
Kanashima Station	金島駅 (群馬県)（かなしま）
Kanatake Station	金武駅（かなたけ）
Kanaya Station	金谷駅（かなや）
Kanayagawa Station	金谷川駅（かなやがわ）
Kanayama Station (Aichi)	金山駅 (愛知県)（かなやま）
Kanayama Station (Fukuoka)	金山駅 (福岡県)（かなやま）
Kanayama Station (Hokkaido)	金山駅 (北海道)（かなやま）
Kanayama-chō Station	銀山町駅（かなやまちょう）
Kanayasawa Station	金谷沢駅（かなやさわ）
Kanazawa Station	金沢駅（かなざわ）
Kanazawa-Bunko Station	金沢文庫駅（かなざわぶんこ）
Kanazawa-Hakkei Station	金沢八景駅（かなざわはっけい）
Kanazuka Station	金塚駅（かなづか）
Kanda Station (Fukuoka)	苅田駅（かんだ）
Kanda Station (Tokyo)	神田駅 (東京都)（かんだ）
Kandaimae Station	関大前駅（かんだいまえ）
Kandatsu Station	神立駅（かんだつ）
Kaneage Station	金上駅（かねあげ）
Kanegafuchi Station	鐘ヶ淵駅（かねがふち）
Kanegasaki Station	金ヶ崎駅（かねがさき）
Kanehama Station	金浜駅（かねはま）
Kanehana Station	金華駅（かねはな）
Kaneko Station	金子駅（かねこ）
Kanemaru Station	金丸駅（かねまる）
Kanente Station	金手駅（かねんて）
Kaneshima Station	金島駅 (福岡県)（かねしま）
Kangetsukyō Station	観月橋駅（かんげつきょう）
Kani Station	可児駅（かに）
Kanie Station	蟹江駅（かにえ）
Kanigawa Station	可児川駅（かにがわ）
Kanita Station	蟹田駅（かにた）
Kanjōdōri-higashi Station	環状通東駅（かんじょうどおりひがし）
Kankanzaka Station	韓々坂駅（かんかんざか）
Kanmata Station	神俣駅（かんまた）
Kanmonkaikyō Mekari Station	関門海峡めかり駅（かんもんかいきょうめかり）
Kannabe Station	神辺駅（かんなべ）
Kannai Station	関内駅（かんない）
Kannami Station	函南駅（かんなみ）
Kanno Station	神野駅（かんの）
Kannon Station	観音駅（かんのん）
Kannonji Station	観音寺駅 (愛知県)（かんのんじ）
Kannonmachi Station	観音町駅（かんのんまち）
Kannoura Station	甲浦駅（かんのうら）
Kanō Station (Gifu)	加納駅 (岐阜県)（かのう）
Kanō Station (Miyazaki)	加納駅 (宮崎県)（かのう）
Kanohara Station	神農原駅（かのはら）
Kanomata Station	鹿又駅（かのまた）
Kanon-machi Station	観音町停留場（かんおんまち）
Kanose Station	鹿瀬駅（かのせ）
Kanrojimae Station	甘露寺前駅（かんろじまえ）
Kansai Airport Station	関西空港駅（かんさいくうこう）
Kantakunosato Station	干拓の里駅（かんたくのさと）
Kanuma Station	鹿沼駅（かぬま）
Kanyūsha-Hikosan Station	歓遊舎ひこさん駅（かんゆうしゃひこさん）
Kanzaki Station (Saga)	神埼駅（かんざき）
Kanzaki Station (Kagawa)	神前駅 (香川県)（かんざき）
Kanzakigawa Station	神崎川駅（かんざきがわ）
Kanzō Station	閑蔵駅（かんぞう）
Karahashimae Station	唐橋前駅（からはしまえ）
Karakasa Station	唐笠駅（からかさ）
Karakawa Station	辛皮駅（からかわ）
Karakida Station	唐木田駅（からきだ）
Karasaki Station	唐崎駅（からさき）
Karashimachō Station	辛島町駅（からしまちょう）
Karasue Station	烏江駅（からすえ）
Karasuma Station	烏丸駅（からすま）
Karasuma-Oike Station	烏丸御池駅（からすまおいけ）
Karasuyama Station	烏山駅（からすやま）
Karatodai Station	唐櫃台駅（からとだい）
Karatsu Station	唐津駅（からつ）
Kareigawa Station	嘉例川駅（かれいがわ）
Karibasawa Station	狩場沢駅（かりばさわ）
Karikawa Station	狩川駅（かりかわ）
Kariu Station	狩生駅（かりう）
Kariwa Station	刈羽駅（かりわ）
Kariwano Station	刈和野駅（かりわの）
Kariya Station	刈谷駅（かりや）
Kariyadomae Station	借宿前駅（かりやどまえ）
Kariyashi Station	刈谷市駅（かりやし）
Kariyasuka Station	苅安賀駅（かりやすか）
Karuga Station	狩留家駅（かるが）
Karugahama Station	かるが浜駅（かるがはま）
Karuizawa Station	軽井沢駅（かるいざわ）
Karumo Station	苅藻駅（かるも）
Kasadera Station	笠寺駅（かさでら）
Kasado Station	加佐登駅（かさど）
Kasagami-Kurohae Station	笠上黒生駅（かさがみくろはえ）
Kasagi Station	笠置駅（かさぎ）
Kasahata Station	笠幡駅（かさはた）
Kasai Station	葛西駅（かさい）
Kasai-rinkai-kōen Station	葛西臨海公園駅（かさいりんかいこうえん）
Kasama Station	笠間駅（かさま）
Kasamatsu Station (Gifu)	笠松駅（かさまつ）
Kasamatsu Station (Kyoto)	傘松駅（かさまつ）
Kasanui Station	笠縫駅（かさぬい）
Kasaoka Station	笠岡駅（かさおか）
Kasashiho Station	笠師保駅（かさしほ）
Kasashima Station	笠島駅（かさしま）
Kase Station (Kumamoto)	加勢駅（かせ）
Kase Station (Aomori)	嘉瀬駅（かせ）
Kaseda Station	笠田駅（かせだ）
Kasei Station	禾生駅（かせい）
Kashiba Station	香芝駅（かしば）
Kashiharajingū-mae Station	橿原神宮前駅（かしはらじんぐうまえ）
Kashiharajingū-nishiguchi Station	橿原神宮西口駅（かしはらじんぐうにしぐち）
Kashii Station	香椎駅（かしい）
Kashiijingū Station	香椎神宮駅（かしいじんぐう）
Kashiikaenmae Station	香椎花園前駅（かしいかえんまえ）
Kashiimiyamae Station	香椎宮前駅（かしいみやまえ）
Kashikojima Station	賢島駅（かしこじま）
Kashima Soccer Stadium Station	鹿島サッカースタジアム駅（かしまサッカースタジアム）
Kashima Station (Osaka)	加島駅（かしま）
Kashima Station (Fukushima)	鹿島駅（かしま）
Kashima-Asahi Station	鹿島旭駅（かしまあさひ）
Kashimada Station	鹿島田駅（かしまだ）
Kashimadai Station	鹿島台駅（かしまだい）
Kashimajingū Station	鹿島神宮駅（かしまじんぐう）
Kashimanada Station	鹿島灘駅（かしまなだ）
Kashima-Ōno Station	鹿島大野駅（かしまおおの）
Kashinomori Park Station	かしの森公園前停留場（かしのもりこうえんまえ）
Kashiwa Station	柏駅（かしわ）
Kashiwabara Station	柏原駅 (滋賀県)（かしわばら）
Kashiwadai Station	かしわ台駅（かしわだい）
Kashiwagidaira Station	柏木平駅（かしわぎだいら）
Kashiwamori Station	柏森駅（かしわもり）
Kashiwanoha Campus Station	柏の葉キャンパス駅（かしわのはきゃんぱす）
Kashiwara Station	柏原駅 (大阪府)（かしわら）
Kashiwara-minamiguchi Station	柏原南口駅（かしわらみなみぐち）
Kashiwa-Tanaka Station	柏たなか駅（かしわたなか）
Kashiwazaki Station	柏崎駅（かしわざき）
Kashiyama Station	樫山駅（かしやま）
Kasose Station	風合瀬駅（かそせ）
Kassemba Station	合戦場駅（かっせんば）
Kasubuchi Station	粕淵駅（かすぶち）
Kasuga Station (Fukuoka)	春日駅 (福岡県)（かすが）
Kasuga Station (Tokyo)	春日駅 (東京都)（かすが）
Kasugabaru Station	春日原駅（かすがばる）
Kasugachō Station	春日町駅（かすがちょう）
Kasugagawa Station	春日川駅（かすががわ）
Kasugai Station (JR Central)	春日井駅 (JR東海)（かすがい）
Kasugai Station (Meitetsu)	春日井駅 (名鉄)（かすがい）
Kasugaichō Station	春日居町駅（かすがいちょう）
Kasuganomichi Station (Hankyu)	春日野道駅 (阪急)（かすがのみち）
Kasuganomichi Station (Hanshin)	春日野道駅 (阪神)（かすがのみち）
Kasugayama Station	春日山駅（かすがやま）
Kasukabe Station	春日部駅（かすかべ）
Kasukawa Station	粕川駅（かすかわ）
Kasumi Station	香住駅（かすみ）
Kasumigaoka Station (Hyogo)	霞ヶ丘駅 (兵庫県)（かすみがおか）
Kasumigaoka Station (Nara)	霞ヶ丘駅 (奈良県)（かすみがおか）
Kasumigaseki Station (Saitama)	霞ヶ関駅 (埼玉県)（かすみがせき）
Kasumigaseki Station (Tokyo)	霞ヶ関駅 (東京都)（かすみがせき）
Kasumigaura Station	霞ヶ浦駅（かすみがうら）
Kasumori Station	烏森駅（かすもり）
Kata Station	賀田駅（かた）
Katabiranotsuji Station	帷子ノ辻駅（かたびらのつじ）
Katahama Station	片浜駅（かたはま）
Katahara Station	形原駅（かたはら）
Kataharamachi Station (Kagawa)	片原町駅（かたはらまち）
Kataharamachi Station (Toyama)	片原町停留場（かたはらまち）
Katakai Station	片貝駅（かたかい）
Katakura Station	片倉駅（かたくら）
Katakurachō Station	片倉町駅（かたくらちょう）
Katamachi Station (Jōetsu)	潟町駅（かたまち）
Katamoto Station	潟元駅（かたもと）
Katano Station	片野駅（かたの）
Katanoshi Station	交野市駅（かたのし）
Kataoka Station	片岡駅（かたおか）
Katase-Enoshima Station	片瀬江ノ島駅（かたせえのしま）
Katase-Shirata Station	片瀬白田駅（かたせしらた）
Kataseyama Station	片瀬山駅（かたせやま）
Katashimo Station	堅下駅（かたしも）
Katata Station	堅田駅（かたた）
Katei Saibansho-mae Station	家庭裁判所前駅（かていさいばんしょまえ）
Kato Station	加斗駅（かと）
Katori Station	香取駅（かとり）
Katsuma Station	勝間駅（かつま）
Katsumada Station	勝間田駅（かつまだ）
Katsuno Station	勝野駅（かつの）
Katsunuma-budōkyō Station	勝沼ぶどう郷駅（かつぬまぶどうきょう）
Katsura Station	桂駅（かつら）
Katsuradai Station	桂台駅（かつらだい）
Katsuragawa Station (Hokkaidō)	桂川駅 (北海道)（かつらがわ）
Katsuragawa Station (Kyoto)	桂川駅 (京都府)（かつらがわ）
Katsurane Station	桂根駅（かつらね）
Katsuraoka Station	桂岡駅（かつらおか）
Katsurase Station	桂瀬駅（かつらせ）
Katsuta Station	勝田駅（かつた）
Katsutadai Station	勝田台駅（かつただい）
Katsuura Station	勝浦駅（かつうら）
Katsuyama Station	勝山駅（かつやま）
Katsuyamachō Station	勝山町駅（かつやまちょう）
Kawabata Station	川端駅（かわばた）
Kawabe Station (Aomori)	川部駅（かわべ）
Kawabe Station (Akita)	川辺駅（かわべ）
Kawabejuku Station	川辺宿駅（かわべじゅく）
Kawabenomori Station	河辺の森駅（かわべのもり）
Kawabeoki Station	川辺沖駅（かわべおき）
Kawachi-Amami Station	河内天美駅（かわちあまみ）
Kawachi-Eiwa Station	河内永和駅（かわちえいわ）
Kawachi-Hanazono Station	河内花園駅（かわちはなぞの）
Kawachi-Iwafune Station	河内磐船駅（かわちいわふね）
Kawachi-Katakami Station	河内堅上駅（かわちかたかみ）
Kawachi-Kokubu Station	河内国分駅（かわちこくぶ）
Kawachi-Kosaka Station	河内小阪駅（かわちこさか）
Kawachi-Matsubara Station	河内松原駅（かわちまつばら）
Kawachi-Mori Station	河内森駅（かわちもり）
Kawachinagano Station	河内長野駅（かわちながの）
Kawachi-Yamamoto Station	河内山本駅（かわちやまもと）
Kawado Station	川戸駅（かわど）
Kawage Station	河芸駅（かわげ）
Kawageta Station	川桁駅（かわげた）
Kawagishi Station	川岸駅（かわぎし）
Kawagoe Station	川越駅（かわごえ）
Kawagoeshi Station	川越市駅（かわごえし）
Kawagoe Tomisuhara Station	川越富洲原駅（かわごえとみすはら）
Kawaguchi Station	川口駅（かわぐち）
Kawaguchiko Station	河口湖駅（かわぐちこ）
Kawaguchi-Motogō Station	川口元郷駅（かわぐちもとごう）
Kawahara Station	河原駅（かわはら）
Kawahigashi Station (Fukushima)	川東駅 (福島県)（かわひがし）
Kawahigashi Station (Saga)	川東駅 (佐賀県)（かわひがし）
Kawahira Station	川平駅（かわひら）
Kawai Station (Ibaraki)	河合駅（かわい）
Kawai Station (Tokyo)	川井駅（かわい）
Kawainishi Station	河合西駅（かわいにし）
Kawai-Takaoka Station	川合高岡駅（かわいたかおか）
Kawaji Station	川路駅（かわじ）
Kawajionsen Station	川治温泉駅（かわじおんせん）
Kawaji-Yumoto Station	川治湯元駅（かわじゆもと）
Kawakado Station	川角駅（かわかど）
Kawake Station	河毛駅（かわけ）
Kawakura Station	川倉駅（かわくら）
Kawama Station	川間駅（かわま）
Kawamae Station	川前駅（かわまえ）
Kawamata Station	川俣駅（かわまた）
Kawaminami Station	川南駅（かわみなみ）
Kawamiya Station	川宮駅（かわみや）
Kawamura Station (Aichi)	川村駅 (愛知県)（かわむら）
Kawamura Station (Kumamoto)	川村駅 (熊本県)（かわむら）
Kawana Station (Shizuoka)	川奈駅（かわな）
Kawana Station (Aichi)	川名駅（かわな）
Kawanakajima Station	川中島駅（かわなかじま）
Kawane-Koyama Station	川根小山駅（かわねこやま）
Kawaneonsen-Sasamado Station	川根温泉笹間渡駅（かわねおんせんささまど）
Kawane-Ryōgoku Station	川根両国駅（かわねりょうごく）
Kawanishi Station (Osaka)	川西駅 (大阪府)（かわにし）
Kawanishi Station (Yamaguchi)	川西駅 (山口県)（かわにし）
Kawanishi-Ikeda Station	川西池田駅（かわにしいけだ）
Kawanishi-noseguchi Station	川西能勢口駅（かわにしのせぐち）
Kawano Station	河曲駅（かわの）
Kawanoe Station	川之江駅（かわのえ）
Kawara Station	香春駅（かわら）
Kawarada Station	河原田駅（かわらだ）
Kawaragahama Station	瓦ヶ浜駅（かわらがはま）
Kawaraguchi-Mihagino Station	香春口三萩野駅（かわらぐちみはぎの）
Kawaraishi Station	川原石駅（かわらいし）
Kawaramachi Station (Kagawa)	瓦町駅（かわらまち）
Kawaramachi Station (Mie)	川原町駅（かわらまち）
Kawaramachi Station (Miyagi)	河原町駅 (宮城県)（かわらまち）
Kawarayuonsen Station	川原湯温泉駅（かわらゆおんせん）
Kawasa Station	河佐駅（かわさ）
Kawasaki Station	川崎駅（かわさき）
Kawasaki-Daishi Station	川崎大師駅（かわさきだいし）
Kawasakiguchi Station	河崎口駅（かわさきぐち）
Kawasaki-shinmachi Station	川崎新町駅（かわさきしんまち）
Kawase Station	河瀬駅（かわせ）
Kawashima Station	川島駅（かわしま）
Kawashiri Station	川尻駅（かわしり）
Kawata Station	川田駅（かわた）
Kawatabi-Onsen Station	川渡温泉駅（かわたびおんせん）
Kawatana Station	川棚駅（かわたな）
Kawatanaonsen Station	川棚温泉駅（かわたなおんせん）
Kawato Station	川跡駅（かわと）
Kawauchi Station (Iwate)	川内駅 (岩手県)（かわうち）
Kawauchi Station (Miyagi)	川内駅 (宮城県)（かわうち）
Kawawachō Station	川和町駅（かわわちょう）
Kawayama Station	河山駅（かわやま）
Kawayuonsen Station	川湯温泉駅（かわゆおんせん）
Kawazoe Station	川添駅（かわぞえ）
Kawazu Station	河津駅（かわづ）
Kayabachō Station	茅場町駅（かやばちょう）
Kayakusa Station	萱草駅（かやくさ）
Kayama Station	栢山駅（かやま）
Kayamachi Station	茅町駅（かやまち）
Kayamachi Rokuchōme Station	萱町六丁目駅（かやまちろくちょうめ）
Kayanuma Station	茅沼駅（かやぬま）
Kayashima Station	萱島駅（かやしま）
Kazahaya Station	風早駅（かざはや）
Kazamatsuri Station	風祭駅（かざまつり）
Kazashigaoka Station	挿頭丘駅（かざしがおか）
Kazo Station	加須駅（かぞ）
Kazuma Station	鹿妻駅（かづま）
Kazuno-Hanawa Station	鹿角花輪駅（かづのはなわ）
Kazusa-Azuma Station	上総東駅（かずさあずま）
Kazusa-Ichinomiya Station	上総一ノ宮駅（かずさいちのみや）
Kazusa-Kameyama Station	上総亀山駅（かずさかめやま）
Kazusa-Kawama Station	上総川間駅（かずさかわま）
Kazusa-Kiyokawa Station	上総清川駅（かずさきよかわ）
Kazusa-Kubo Station	上総久保駅（かずさくぼ）
Kazusa-Matsuoka Station	上総松丘駅（かずさまつおか）
Kazusa-Minato Station	上総湊駅（かずさみなと）
Kazusa-Mitsumata Station	上総三又駅（かずさみつまた）
Kazusa-Murakami Station	上総村上駅（かずさむらかみ）
Kazusa-Nakagawa Station	上総中川駅（かずさなかがわ）
Kazusa-Nakano Station	上総中野駅（かずさなかの）
Kazusa-Okitsu Station	上総興津駅（かずさおきつ）
Kazusa-Ōkubo Station	上総大久保駅（かずさおおくぼ）
Kazusa-Tsurumai Station	上総鶴舞駅（かずさつるまい）
Kazusa-Ushiku Station	上総牛久駅（かずさうしく）
Kazusa-Yamada Station	上総山田駅（かずさやまだ）

=== Ke ===
Keage Station	蹴上駅（けあげ）
Kebaraichi Station	花原市駅（けばらいち）
Kega Station	毛賀駅 （けが）
Keibajōmae Station	競馬場前駅 (福岡県)（けいばじょうまえ）
Keihan Ishiyama Station	京阪石山駅（けいはんいしやま）
Keihan-otsukyo Station	京阪大津京駅（けいはんおおつきょう）
Keihan Yamashina Station	京阪山科駅（けいはんやましな）
Keihan Zeze Station	京阪膳所駅（けいはんぜぜ）
Keikyū Higashi-kanagawa Station	京急東神奈川駅（けいきゅうひがしかながわ）
Keikyū Kamata Station	京急蒲田駅（けいきゅうかまた）
Keikyū Kawasaki Station	京急川崎駅（けいきゅうかわさき）
Keikyū Kurihama Station	京急久里浜駅（けいきゅうくりはま）
Keikyū Nagasawa Station	京急長沢駅（けいきゅうながさわ）
Keikyū Ōtsu Station	京急大津駅（けいきゅうおおつ）
Keikyū Shinkoyasu Station	京急新子安駅（けいきゅうしんこやす）
Keikyū Taura Station	京急田浦駅（けいきゅうたうら）
Keikyū Tomioka Station	京急富岡駅（けいきゅうとみおか）
Keikyū Tsurumi Station	京急鶴見駅（けいきゅうつるみ）
Keiō Hachiōji Station	京王八王子駅（けいおうはちおうじ）
Keiō Horinouchi Station	京王堀之内駅（けいおうほりのうち）
Keiō Inadazutsumi Station	京王稲田堤駅（けいおういなだづつみ）
Keiō Katakura Station	京王片倉駅（けいおうかたくら）
Keiō Nagayama Station	京王永山駅（けいおうながやま）
Keiō Tama Center Station	京王多摩センター駅（けいおうたませんたー）
Keiō Tamagawa Station	京王多摩川駅（けいおうたまがわ）
Keiō Yomiuri Land Station	京王よみうりランド駅（けいおうよみうりらんど）
Keirinjōmae Station (Aichi)	競輪場前停留場（けいりんじょうまえ）
Keirinjōmae Station (Toyama)	競輪場前駅 (富山県)（けいりんじょうまえ）
Keisan Kagaku Center Station	計算科学センター駅（けいさんかがくせんたー）
Keisatsushomae Station	警察署前駅 (山梨県)（けいさつしょまえ）
Keisei Chiba Station	京成千葉駅（けいせいちば）
Keisei Funabashi Station	京成船橋駅（けいせいふなばし）
Keisei Inage Station	京成稲毛駅（けいせいいなげ）
Keisei Hikifune Station	京成曳舟駅（けいせいひきふね）
Keisei Kanamachi Station	京成金町駅（けいせいかなまち）
Keisei Koiwa Station	京成小岩駅（けいせいこいわ）
Keisei Makuhari Station	京成幕張駅（けいせいまくはり）
Keisei Makuharihongō Station	京成幕張本郷駅（けいせいまくはりほんごう）
Keisei Nakayama Station	京成中山駅（けいせいなかやま）
Keisei Narita Station	京成成田駅（けいせいなりた）
Keisei Nishifuna Station	京成西船駅（けいせいにしふな）
Keisei Ōkubo Station	京成大久保駅（けいせいおおくぼ）
Keisei Ōwada Station	京成大和田駅（けいせいおおわだ）
Keisei Sakura Station	京成佐倉駅（けいせいさくら）
Keisei Sekiya Station	京成関屋駅（けいせいせきや）
Keisei Shisui Station	京成酒々井駅（けいせいしすい）
Keisei Takasago Station	京成高砂駅（けいせいたかさご）
Keisei Tateishi Station	京成立石駅（けいせいたていし）
Keisei Tsudanuma Station	京成津田沼駅（けいせいつだぬま）
Keisei Ueno Station	京成上野駅（けいせいうえの）
Keisei Usui Station	京成臼井駅（けいせいうすい）
Keisei Yawata Station	京成八幡駅（けいせいやわた）
Keisen Station	桂川駅 (福岡県)（けいせん）
Kembuchi Station	剣淵駅（けんぶち）
Kemigawa Station	検見川駅（けみがわ）
Kemigawahama Station	検見川浜駅（けみがわはま）
Kenchō-mae Station (Chiba)	県庁前駅 (千葉県)（けんちょうまえ）
Kenchō-mae Station (Ehime)	県庁前停留場 (愛媛県)（けんちょうまえ）
Kenchō-mae Station (Hiroshima)	県庁前駅 (広島県)（けんちょうまえ）
Kenchō-mae Station (Hyōgo)	県庁前駅 (兵庫県)（けんちょうまえ）
Kenchō-mae Station (Toyama)	県庁前停留場 (富山県)（けんちょうまえ）
Kenkyū-gakuen Station	研究学園駅（けんきゅうがくえん）
Kenritsubijutsukanmae Station	県立美術館前駅（けんりつびじゅつかんまえ）
Kenritsu Daigaku Station	県立大学駅（けんりつだいがく）
Ken-sōgō-undōjō Station	県総合運動場駅（けんそうごううんどうじょう）
Kenyoshi Station	剣吉駅（けんよし）
Kesennuma Station	気仙沼駅（けせんぬま）
Keyakidai Station	けやき台駅（けやきだい）
Keyakidaira Station	欅平駅（けやきだいら）

=== Ki ===
Kiba Station	木場駅（きば）
Kibana Station	木花駅（きばな）
Kibinomakibi Station	吉備真備駅（きびのまきび）
Kibitsu Station	吉備津駅（きびつ）
Kibōgaoka Station	希望ヶ丘駅（きぼうがおか）
Kibōgaokakōkōmae Station	希望が丘高校前駅（きぼうがおかこうこうまえ）
Kibukawa Station	貴生川駅（きぶかわ）
Kibuneguchi Station	貴船口駅（きぶねぐち）
Kichijōji Station	吉祥寺駅（きちじょうじ）
Kida Station	木田駅（きだ）
Kido Station	木戸駅（きど）
Kido-Nanzōinmae Station	城戸南蔵院前駅（きどなんぞういんまえ）
Kiga Station	気賀駅（きが）
Kii Station	紀伊駅（きい）
Kii-Arita Station	紀伊有田駅（きいありた）
Kii-Gobō Station	紀伊御坊駅（きいごぼう）
Kii-Hiki Station	紀伊日置駅（きいひき）
Kii-Hime Station	紀伊姫駅（きいひめ）
Kii-Hosokawa Station	紀伊細川駅（きいほそかわ）
Kii-Ichigi Station	紀伊市木駅（きいいちぎ）
Kii-Ida Station	紀伊井田駅（きいいだ）
Kii-Kamiya Station	紀伊神谷駅（きいかみや）
Kii-Katsuura Station	紀伊勝浦駅（きいかつうら）
Kii-Miyahara Station	紀伊宮原駅（きいみやはら）
Kii-Nagashima Station	紀伊長島駅（きいながしま）
Kii-Nagata Station	紀伊長田駅（きいながた）
Kii-Nakanoshima Station	紀伊中ノ島駅（きいなかのしま）
Kii-Ogura Station	紀伊小倉駅（きいおぐら）
Kiire Station	喜入駅（きいれ）
Kii-Sano Station	紀伊佐野駅（きいさの）
Kii-Shimizu Station	紀伊清水駅（きいしみず）
Kii-Shinjō Station	紀伊新庄駅（きいしんじょう）
Kii-Tahara Station	紀伊田原駅（きいたはら）
Kii-Tanabe Station	紀伊田辺駅（きいたなべ）
Kii-Tenma Station	紀伊天満駅（きいてんま）
Kii-Tonda Station	紀伊富田駅（きいとんだ）
Kii-Uchihara Station	紀伊内原駅（きいうちはら）
Kii-Uragami Station	紀伊浦神駅（きいうらがみ）
Kii-Yamada Station	紀伊山田駅（きいやまだ）
Kii-Yura Station	紀伊由良駅（きいゆら）
Kiki Station	木岐駅（きき）
Kikitsu Station	喜々津駅（ききつ）
Kikonai Station	木古内駅（きこない）
Kikugaoka Station	企救丘駅（きくがおか）
Kikugawa Station	菊川駅 (静岡県)（きくがわ）
Kikukawa Station	菊川駅 (東京都)（きくかわ）
Kikuma Station	菊間駅（きくま）
Kikuna Station	菊名駅（きくな）
Kikusui Station	菊水駅（きくすい）
Kikuta Station	喜久田駅（きくた）
Kikyō Station	桔梗駅（ききょう）
Kikyōgaoka Station	桔梗が丘駅（ききょうがおか）
Kimachi Station	来待駅（きまち）
Kimi Station	木見駅（きみ）
Kimigahama Station	君ヶ浜駅（きみがはま）
Kimiidera Station	紀三井寺駅（きみいでら）
Kimitōge Station	紀見峠駅（きみとうげ）
Kimitsu Station	君津駅（きみつ）
Kinashi Station	鬼無駅（きなし）
Kinjō-futō Station	金城ふ頭駅（きんじょうふとう）
Kinkō Station	錦江駅（きんこう）
Kinmeiji Station	欽明路駅（きんめいじ）
Kinno Station	金野駅（きんの）
Kino Station	木野駅（きの）
Kinoe Station	木上駅（きのえ）
Kinokawa Station	紀ノ川駅（きのかわ）
Kinomiya Station	来宮駅（きのみや）
Kinomoto Station	木ノ本駅（きのもと）
Kinosakionsen Station	城崎温泉駅（きのさきおんせん）
Kinoshita Station	木ノ下駅（きのした）
Kinoyama Station	木野山駅（きのやま）
Kinshichō Station	錦糸町駅（きんしちょう）
Kintaichi-Onsen Station	金田一温泉駅（きんたいちおんせん）
Kintetsu Gose Station	近鉄御所駅（きんてつごせ）
Kintetsu-Hatta Station	近鉄八田駅（きんてつはった）
Kintetsu Kanie Station	近鉄蟹江駅（きんてつかにえ）
Kintetsu Koriyama Station	近鉄郡山駅（きんてつこおりやま）
Kintetsu Miyazu Station	近鉄宮津駅（きんてつみやづ）
Kintetsu Nagashima Station	近鉄長島駅（きんてつながしま）
Kintetsu Nagoya Station	近鉄名古屋駅（きんてつなごや）
Kintetsu Nara Station	近鉄奈良駅（きんてつなら）
Kintetsu Nippombashi Station	近鉄日本橋駅（きんてつにっぽんばし）
Kintetsu Shimoda Station	近鉄下田駅（きんてつしもだ）
Kintetsu Shinjō Station	近鉄新庄駅（きんてつしんじょう）
Kintetsu Tambabashi Station	近鉄丹波橋駅（きんてつたんばばし）
Kintetsu Tomida Station	近鉄富田駅（きんてつとみだ）
Kintetsu Yao Station	近鉄八尾駅（きんてつやお）
Kintetsu Yatomi Station	近鉄弥富駅（きんてつやとみ）
Kintetsu Yokkaichi Station	近鉄四日市駅（きんてつよっかいち）
Kinugasa Station	衣笠駅（きぬがさ）
Kinugawakōen Station	鬼怒川公園駅（きぬがわこうえん）
Kinugawaonsen Station	鬼怒川温泉駅（きぬがわおんせん）
Kinunobebashi Station	絹延橋駅（きぬのべばし）
Kinuyama Station	衣山駅（きぬやま）
Kioroshi Station	木下駅（きおろし）
Kira-Yoshida Station	吉良吉田駅（きらよしだ）
Kire Station	吉礼駅（きれ）
Kire-Uriwari Station	喜連瓜破駅（きれうりわり）
Kiridōshi Station	切通駅（きりどおし）
Kirihara Station (Nagano)	桐原駅 (長野県)（きりはら）
Kirihara Station (Niigata)	桐原駅 (新潟県)（きりはら）
Kiriishi Station	切石駅（きりいし）
Kirikiri Station	吉里吉里駅（きりきり）
Kirime Station	切目駅（きりめ）
Kirishimajingū Station	霧島神宮駅（きりしまじんぐう）
Kirishimaonsen Station	霧島温泉駅（きりしまおんせん）
Kirohara Station	木路原駅（きろはら）
Kiryū Station	桐生駅（きりゅう）
Kiryū-Kyūjō-Mae Station	桐生球場前駅（きりゅうきゅうじょうまえ）
Kisa Station	吉舎駅（きさ）
Kisaichi Station	私市駅（きさいち）
Kisakata Station	象潟駅（きさかた）
Kisarazu Station	木更津駅（きさらづ）
Kishi Station (Osaka)	喜志駅（きし）
Kishi Station (Wakayama)	貴志駅（きし）
Kishibe Station	岸辺駅（きしべ）
Kishibojinmae Station	鬼子母神前駅（きしぼじんまえ）
Kishimoto Station	岸本駅（きしもと）
Kishine-kōen Station	岸根公園駅（きしねこうえん）
Kishinosato Station	岸里駅（きしのさと）
Kishinosato-Tamade Station	岸里玉出駅（きしのさとたまで）
Kishiwada Station	岸和田駅（きしわだ）
Kiso-Fukushima Station	木曽福島駅（きそふくしま）
Kisogawa Station	木曽川駅（きそがわ）
Kisogawazutsumi Station	木曽川堤駅（きそがわづつみ）
Kiso-Hirasawa Station	木曽平沢駅（きそひらさわ）
Kisuki Station	木次駅（きすき）
Kita Station	喜多駅（きた）
Kita-Ageo Station	北上尾駅（きたあげお）
Kita-Akabane Station	北赤羽駅（きたあかばね）
Kita-Amarume Station	北余目駅（きたあまるめ）
Kita-Anjō Station	北安城駅（きたあんじょう）
Kita-Arai Station	北新井駅（きたあらい）
Kita-Arima Station	北有馬駅（きたありま）
Kita-Asaka Station	北朝霞駅（きたあさか）
Kita-Ayase Station	北綾瀬駅（きたあやせ）
Kitabatake Station	北畠駅（きたばたけ）
Kita-Biei Station	北美瑛駅（きたびえい）
Kita-Chigasaki Station	北茅ヶ崎駅（きたちがさき）
Kita-Chippubetsu Station	北秩父別駅（きたちっぷべつ）
Kitachō Station	木太町駅（きたちょう）
Kitago Station	北府駅（きたご）
Kita-Fuchū Station	北府中駅（きたふちゅう）
Kita-Fujioka Station	北藤岡駅（きたふじおか）
Kita-Funaoka Station	北舟岡駅（きたふなおか）
Kitafutō Station	北埠頭駅（きたふとう）
Kitagata Station (Fukuoka)	北方駅 (福岡県)（きたがた）
Kitagata Station (Saga)	北方駅 (佐賀県)（きたがた）
Kitagata-Makuwa Station	北方真桑駅（きたがたまくわ）
Kitagawa Station	北川駅（きたがわ）
Kitagawachi Station	北河内駅 (徳島県)（きたがわち）
Kitagō Station	北郷駅（きたごう）
Kitagōchi Station	北河内駅 (山口県)（きたごうち）
Kita-Gōdo Station	北神戸駅（きたごうど）
Kita-Gosen Station	北五泉駅（きたごせん）
Kita-Hachioji Station	北八王子駅（きたはちおうじ）
Kitahama Station (Hokkaido)	北浜駅 (北海道)（きたはま）
Kitahama Station (Osaka)	北浜駅 (大阪府)（きたはま）
Kitahanada Station	北花田駅（きたはなだ）
Kitahara Station	北原駅（きたはら）
Kita-Hatsutomi Station	北初富駅（きたはつとみ）
Kita-Higashiguchi Station	木太東口駅（きたひがしぐち）
Kita-Hinode Station	北日ノ出駅（きたひので）
Kita-Hiroshima Station	北広島駅（きたひろしま）
Kita-Horinouchi Station	北堀之内駅（きたほりのうち）
Kita-Hosono Station	北細野駅（きたほその）
Kita-Ichiyan Station	北一已駅（きたいちやん）
Kita-Iiyama Station	北飯山駅（きたいいやま）
Kita-Ikebukuro Station	北池袋駅（きたいけぶくろ）
Kita-Ikeno Station	北池野駅（きたいけの）
Kita-Itami Station	北伊丹駅（きたいたみ）
Kita-Iyo Station	北伊予駅（きたいよ）
Kitajō Station	北条駅（きたじょう）
Kitajūhachijō Station	北18条駅（きたじゅうはちじょう）
Kitajūnijō Station	北12条駅（きたじゅうにじょう）
Kitajūsanjō-higashi Station	北13条東駅（きたじゅうさんじょうひがし）
Kitakagaya Station	北加賀屋駅（きたかがや）
Kita-Kamakura Station	北鎌倉駅（きたかまくら）
Kitakami Station	北上駅（きたかみ）
Kita-Kanaoka Station	北金岡駅（きたかなおか）
Kita-Kanegasawa Station	北金ヶ沢駅（きたかねがさわ）
Kita-Kanuma Station	北鹿沼駅（きたかぬま）
Kita-Kashiwa Station	北柏駅（きたかしわ）
Kita-Kasukabe Station	北春日部駅（きたかすかべ）
Kitakata Station	喜多方駅（きたかた）
Kita-Kembuchi Station	北剣淵駅（きたけんぶち）
Kita-Kogane Station	北小金駅（きたこがね）
Kita-Kokubun Station	北国分駅（きたこくぶん）
Kita-Komatsu Station	北小松駅（きたこまつ）
Kita-Koshigaya Station	北越谷駅（きたこしがや）
Kita-Kōnosu Station	北鴻巣駅（きたこうのす）
Kita-Kumamoto Station	北熊本駅（きたくまもと）
Kitakume Station	北久米駅（きたくめ）
Kita-Kurihama Station	北久里浜駅（きたくりはま）
Kita-Kusu Station	北楠駅（きたくす）
Kitakyushu Kamotsu Terminal Station	北九州貨物ターミナル駅（きたきゅうしゅうかもつたーみなる）
Kitama Station	北間駅（きたま）
Kita-Marumori Station	北丸森駅（きたまるもり）
Kitamata Station	北俣駅（きたまた）
Kita-Matsudo Station	北松戸駅（きたまつど）
Kita-Matsumoto Station	北松本駅（きたまつもと）
Kitami Station (Tokyo)	喜多見駅（きたみ）
Kitami Station (Hokkaido)	北見駅（きたみ）
Kita-Mitsukaidō Station	北水海道駅（きたみつかいどう）
Kita-Mōka Station	北真岡駅（きたもおか）
Kitamori Station	北森駅（きたもり）
Kitamoto Station	北本駅（きたもと）
Kitanada Station	喜多灘駅（きたなだ）
Kita-Nagano Station	北長野駅（きたながの）
Kita-Naganoda Station	北永野田駅（きたながのだ）
Kita-Nagaoka Station	北長岡駅（きたながおか）
Kita-Nagase Station	北長瀬駅（きたながせ）
Kita-Nagayama Station	北永山駅（きたながやま）
Kita-Nakagomi Station	北中込駅（きたなかごみ）
Kita-Narashino Station	北習志野駅（きたならしの）
Kitanii-Matsumotodaigakumae Station	北新・松本大学前駅（きたにい・まつもとだいがくまえ）
Kitanijūyojō Station	北24条駅（きたにじゅうよじょう）
Kitano Station (Fukuoka)	北野駅 (福岡県)（きたの）
Kitano Station (Tokyo)	北野駅 (東京都)（きたの）
Kita-Nobeoka Station	北延岡駅（きたのべおか）
Kitanoda Station	北野田駅（きたのだ）
Kitano-Hakubaichō Station	北野白梅町駅（きたのはくばいちょう）
Kita-Noheji Station	北野辺地駅（きたのへじ）
Kitano-Masuzuka Station	北野桝塚駅（きたのますづか）
Kita-Noshiro Station	北能代駅（きたのしろ）
Kita-Ōgaki Station	北大垣駅（きたおおがき）
Kita-Ōishida Station	北大石田駅（きたおおいしだ）
Kitaōji Station	北大路駅（きたおおじ）
Kita-Okazaki Station	北岡崎駅（きたおかざき）
Kita-Ōmachi Station	北大町駅（きたおおまち）
Kita-Ōmagari Station	北大曲駅（きたおおまがり）
Kita-Ōmiya Station	北大宮駅（きたおおみや）
Kita-Ōno Station	北大野駅（きたおおの）
Kita-Otari Station	北小谷駅（きたおたり）
Kita-Pippu Station	北比布駅（きたぴっぷ）
Kita-Sabae Station	北鯖江駅（きたさばえ）
Kitasandō Station	北参道駅（きたさんどう）
Kitasanjo Station	北三条駅（きたさんじょう）
Kitasanjūyojō Station	北34条駅（きたさんじゅうよじょう）
Kita-Sasebo Station	北佐世保駅（きたさせぼ）
Kita-Sendai Station	北仙台駅（きたせんだい）
Kita-Senju Station	北千住駅（きたせんじゅ）
Kita-Senri Station	北千里駅（きたせんり）
Kita-Senzoku Station	北千束駅（きたせんぞく）
Kita-Shinagawa Station	北品川駅（きたしながわ）
Kitashinchi Station	北新地駅（きたしんち）
Kitashinkawa Station	北新川駅（きたしんかわ）
Kitashinoda Station	北信太駅（きたしのだ）
Kita-Shin-Yokohama Station	北新横浜駅（きたしんよこはま）
Kita-Shirakawa Station	北白川駅（きたしらかわ）
Kita-Sukematsu Station	北助松駅（きたすけまつ）
Kita-Suzaka Station	北須坂駅（きたすざか）
Kita-Takaiwa Station	北高岩駅（きたたかいわ）
Kita-Takasaki Station	北高崎駅（きたたかさき）
Kita-Tanabe Station	北田辺駅（きたたなべ）
Kita-Tatsumi Station	北巽駅（きたたつみ）
Kita-Toda Station	北戸田駅（きたとだ）
Kita-Tokiwa Station	北常盤駅（きたときわ）
Kitatono Station	北殿駅（きたとの）
Kita-Toyotsu Station	北豊津駅（きたとよつ）
Kitauchi Station	北宇智駅（きたうち）
Kitaura Station (Kōchi)	北浦停留場（きたうら）
Kitaura Station (Miyagi)	北浦駅（きたうら）
Kitaurakohan Station	北浦湖畔駅（きたうらこはん）
Kita-Urawa Station	北浦和駅（きたうらわ）
Kita-Uwajima Station	北宇和島駅（きたうわじま）
Kitayama Station (Aichi)	喜多山駅 (愛知県)（きたやま）
Kitayama Station (Ehime)	喜多山駅 (愛媛県)（きたやま）
Kitayama Station (Kyoto)	北山駅 (京都府)（きたやま）
Kitayama Station (Miyagi)	北山駅 (宮城県)（きたやま）
Kitayama Station (Tochigi)	北山駅 (栃木県)（きたやま）
Kita-Yamada Station	北山田駅 (大分県)（きたやまだ）
Kita-Yamata Station	北山田駅 (神奈川県)（きたやまた）
Kita-Yamagata Station	北山形駅（きたやまがた）
Kita-Yobanchō Station	北四番丁駅（きたよばんちょう）
Kita-Yono Station	北与野駅（きたよの）
Kita-Yoshida Station	北吉田駅（きたよしだ）
Kita-Yoshihara Station	北吉原駅（きたよしはら）
Kitsuki Station	杵築駅（きつき）
Kitsunegasaki Station	狐ヶ崎駅（きつねがさき）
Kiwa Station (Yamaguchi)	岐波駅（きわ）
Kiwa Station (Wakayama)	紀和駅（きわ）
Kiwado Station	黄波戸駅（きわど）
Kiyachō Station	木屋町駅（きやちょう）
Kiyama Station (Saga)	基山駅（きやま）
Kiyama Station (Fukui)	気山駅（きやま）
Kiyo Station	木与駅（きよ）
Kiyohara District Civic Center Station	清原地区市民センター前停留場（きよはらちくしみんせんたーまえ）
Kiyohata Station	清畠駅（きよはた）
Kiyokawa Station	清川駅（きよかわ）
Kiyokawaguchi Station	清川口駅（きよかわぐち）
Kiyomizu-Gojō Station	清水五条駅（きよみずこじょう）
Kiyone Station	清音駅（きよね）
Kiyosato Station	清里駅（きよさと）
Kiyosatocho Station	清里町駅（きよさとちょう）
Kiyose Station	清瀬駅（きよせ）
Kiyoshikōjin Station	清荒神駅（きよしこうじん）
Kiyosu Station	清洲駅（きよす）
Kiyosumi-Shirakawa Station	清澄白河駅（きよすみしらかわ）
Kiyotake Station	清武駅（きよたけ）
Kiyotaki Station	清滝駅（きよたき）
Kizaki Station	木崎駅（きざき）
Kizu Station (Hyogo)	木津駅 (兵庫県)（きづ）
Kizu Station (Kyoto)	木津駅 (京都府)（きづ）
Kizugawa Station	木津川駅（きづがわ）
Kizugawadai Station	木津川台駅（きづがわだい）
Kizukuri Station	木造駅（きづくり）
Kizuri-Kamikita Station	衣摺加美北駅（きずりかみきた）

=== Ko ===
Kō Station (Aichi)	国府駅 (愛知県)（こう）
Kō Station (Tokushima)	府中駅 (徳島県)（こう）
Koami-cho Station	小網町駅（こあみちょう）
Kobana Station	小塙駅（こばな）
Kobanchaya Station	木場茶屋駅（こばんちゃや）
Kobari Station	小針駅（こばり）
Kobata Station	木幡駅 (兵庫県)（こばた）
Kobato Station	小波渡駅（こばと）
Kobayashi Station (Chiba)	小林駅 (千葉県)（こばやし）
Kobayashi Station (Miyazaki)	小林駅 (宮崎県)（こばやし）
Kobe Station (Hyogo)	神戸駅 (兵庫県)（こうべ）
Kobe Station (Nagasaki)	古部駅（こべ）
Kobe Airport Station	神戸空港駅（こうべくうこう）
Kōbe Kamotsu Terminal Station	神戸貨物ターミナル駅（こうべかもつたーみなる）
Kobe-sannomiya Station	神戸三宮駅（こうべさんのみや）
Kobi Station	古井駅（こび）
Koboke Station	小歩危駅（こぼけ）
Koboreguchi Station	河堀口駅（こぼれぐち）
Koboro Station	小幌駅（こぼろ）
Kobuchi Station (Kanagawa)	古淵駅（こぶち）
Kobuchi Station (Akita)	小渕駅（こぶち）
Kobuchizawa Station	小淵沢駅（こぶちざわ）
Kobunato Station	小舟渡駅（こぶなと）
Kōchi Station (Hiroshima)	河内駅（こうち）
Kōchi Station (Kōchi)	高知駅（こうち）
Kōchi-ekimae Station	高知駅前駅（こうちえきまえ）
Kōchishōgyōmae Station	高知商業前駅（こうちしょうぎょうまえ）
Kouchiumi Station	小内海駅（こうちうみ）
Kochibora Station	木知原駅（こちぼら）
Kōda Station (Aichi)	幸田駅（こうだ）
Kōda Station (Nagayo, Nagasaki)	高田駅 (長崎県)（こうだ）
Kōda Station (Saza, Nagasaki)	神田駅 (長崎県)（こうだ）
Kodaira Station	小平駅（こだいら）
Kodama Station	児玉駅（こだま）
Kodenmachō Station	小伝馬町駅（こでんまちょう）
Kōdo Station (Hiroshima)	河戸駅（こうど）
Kōdo Station (Kyoto)	興戸駅（こうど）
Kōdo-Homachigawa Station	河戸帆待川駅（こうどほまちがわ）
Kodomonokuni Station (Aichi)	こどもの国駅 (愛知県)（こどものくに）
Kodomonokuni Station (Kanagawa)	こどもの国駅 (神奈川県)（こどものくに）
Kodomonokuni Station (Miyazaki)	子供の国駅（こどものくに）
Kōen Station	公園駅（こうえん）
Kōenhigashiguchi Station	公園東口駅（こうえんひがしぐち）
Kōenji Station	高円寺駅（こうえんじ）
Kōenkami Station	公園上駅（こうえんかみ）
Kōennishi Station	公園西駅（こうえんにし）
Kōenshimo Station	公園下駅（こうえんしも）
Kōfu Station	甲府駅（こうふ）
Kōfūdai Station (Chiba)	光風台駅 (千葉県)（こうふうだい）
Kōfūdai Station (Osaka)	光風台駅 (大阪府)（こうふうだい）
Koga Station (Ibaraki)	古河駅（こが）
Koga Station (Fukuoka)	古賀駅（こが）
Kogagorufujōmae Station	古賀ゴルフ場前駅（こがごるふじょうまえ）
Koganchaya Station	古賀茶屋駅（こがんちゃや）
Kogane Station (Aichi)	黄金駅 (愛知県)（こがね）
Kogane Station (Hokkaido)	黄金駅 (北海道)（こがね）
Koganechō Station	黄金町駅（こがねちょう）
Koganei Station	小金井駅（こがねい）
Koganejōshi Station	小金城趾駅（こがねじょうし）
Koganezawa Station	小金沢駅（こがねざわ）
Kogawara Station	小川原駅（こがわら）
Koginosato Station	近義の里駅（こぎのさと）
Kogota Station	小牛田駅（こごた）
Koguriyama Station	小栗山駅（こぐりやま）
Kogushi Station	小串駅（こぐし）
Koguwa Station	蚕桑駅（こぐわ）
Kōgyōdanchi Station	工業団地駅（こうぎょうだんち）
Kōgyōkōkō-mae Station	工業高校前駅（こうぎょうこうこうまえ）
Kohama Station	粉浜駅（こはま）
Kohata Station	木幡駅 (JR西日本)（こはた）
Kohoku Station	湖北駅（こほく）
Kōhoku Station (Aichi)	港北駅（こうほく）
Kōhoku Station (Saga)	江北駅 (佐賀県)（こうほく）
Kōhoku Station (Tokyo)	江北駅 (東京都)（こうほく）
Koi Station	広電西広島（己斐）駅（ひろでんにしひろしま（こい））
Koide Station	小出駅（こいで）
Koigakubo Station	恋ヶ窪駅（こいがくぼ）
Koikawa Station (Akita)	鯉川駅（こいかわ）
Koikawa Station (Yamanashi)	小井川駅（こいかわ）
Koike Station	小池駅（こいけ）
Kōikikōenmae Station	広域公園前駅（こういきこうえんまえ）
Koishihama Station	恋し浜駅（こいしはま）
Koishiro Station	漕代駅（こいしろ）
Koiwa Station	小岩駅（こいわ）
Koiwagawa Station	小岩川駅（こいわがわ）
Koiwai Station	小岩井駅（こいわい）
Koiyamagata Station	恋山形駅（こいやまがた）
Koizumi Station (Ehime)	古泉駅（こいずみ）
Koizumi Station (Gifu)	小泉駅（こいずみ）
Koizumimachi Station	小泉町駅（こいずみまち）
Kojima Station	児島駅（こじま）
Kojimashinden Station	小島新田駅（こじましんでん）
Kōjimachi Station	麹町駅（こうじまち）
Kōjiro Station (Nagasaki)	神代駅 (長崎県)（こうじろ）
Kōjiro Station (Yamaguchi)	神代駅 (山口県)（こうじろ）
Kōjiya Station	糀谷駅（こうじや）
Kojōhama Station	虎杖浜駅（こじょうはま）
Kōka Station	甲賀駅（こうか）
Kōkandōmae Station	広貫堂前駅（こうかんどうまえ）
Kokawa Station	粉河駅（こかわ）
Kokenawa Station	苔縄駅（こけなわ）
Kōkimae Station	工機前駅（こうきまえ）
Kokinu Station	小絹駅（こきぬ）
Kokkai-gijidō-mae Station	国会議事堂前駅（こっかいぎじどうまえ）
Kokokei Station	古虎渓駅（ここけい）
Kokonoe Station	九重駅（ここのえ）
Kokubo Station	国母駅（こくぼ）
Kokubu Station (Kagawa)	国分駅 (香川県)（こくぶ）
Kokubu Station (Kagoshima)	国分駅 (鹿児島県)（こくぶ）
Kokubunji Station	国分寺駅（こくぶんじ）
Kokudō Station	国道駅（こくどう）
Kokufu Station	国府駅 (兵庫県)（こくふ）
Kokufu-Tagajō Station	国府多賀城駅（こくふたがじょう）
Kōkū-kōen Station	航空公園駅（こうくうこうえん）
Kokura Station	小倉駅 (福岡県)（こくら）
Kokuritsu Kyōgijō Station	国立競技場駅（こくりつきょうぎじょう）
Kokuryō Station	国領駅（こくりょう）
Kokusai Center Station	国際センター駅 (愛知県)（こくさいせんたー）
Kokusaikaikan Station	国際会館駅（こくさいかいかん）
Kokusai-Tenjijō Station	国際展示場駅（こくさいてんじじょう）
Kōma Station (Iwate)	好摩駅（こうま）
Koma Station (Saitama)	高麗駅（こま）
Komaba-Tōdaimae Station	駒場東大前駅（こまばとうだいまえ）
Komachi Station	古町駅（こまち）
Komachiya Station	小町屋駅（こまちや）
Komada Station	狛田駅（こまだ）
Komae Station	狛江駅（こまえ）
Komagabayashi Station	駒ヶ林駅（こまがばやし）
Komagamine Station	駒ヶ嶺駅（こまがみね）
Komagane Station	駒ヶ根駅（こまがね）
Komagata Station	駒形駅（こまがた）
Komagatake Station	駒ヶ岳駅（こまがたけ）
Komagatani Station	駒ヶ谷駅（こまがたに）
Komagawa Station	高麗川駅（こまがわ）
Komagawa-Nakano Station	駒川中野駅（こまがわなかの）
Komagome Station	駒込駅（こまごめ）
Komaiko Station	小舞子駅（こまいこ）
Komaki Station	小牧駅（こまき）
Komakiguchi Station	小牧口駅（こまきぐち）
Komakihara Station	小牧原駅（こまきはら）
Komanaki Station	駒鳴駅（こまなき）
Komano Station	駒野駅（こまの）
Komatsu Station	小松駅（こまつ）
Komatsukawa Station	小松川駅（こまつかわ）
Komazawa-Daigaku Station	駒沢大学駅（こまざわだいがく）
Kōme Station	神目駅（こうめ）
Komeno Station	米野駅（こめの）
Komenoki Station	米野木駅（こめのき）
Komenotsu Station	米ノ津駅（こめのつ）
Komi Station (Aichi)	古見駅 (愛知県)（こみ）
Komi Station (Okayama)	古見駅 (岡山県)（こみ）
Kōmi Station	神海駅（こうみ）
Kominato Station	小湊駅（こみなと）
Komiya Station	小宮駅（こみや）
Komono Station	菰野駅（こもの）
Komorie Station	小森江駅（こもりえ）
Komoriutanosato-Takaya Station	子守唄の里高屋駅（こもりうたのさとたかや）
Komoro Station	小諸駅（こもろ）
Komoto Station	小本駅（こもと）
Komuro Station	小室駅（こむろ）
Kōmyōike Station	光明池駅（こうみょういけ）
Kōmyōji Station	光明寺駅（こうみょうじ）
Konagai Station	小長井駅（こながい）
Konaka Station	小中駅（こなか）
Konakano Station	小中野駅（こなかの）
Kōnan Station (Shiga)	甲南駅（こうなん）
Kōnan Station (Aichi)	江南駅 (愛知県)（こうなん）
Kōnan Station (Shimane)	江南駅 (島根県)（こうなん）
Kōnan-chūō Station	港南中央駅（こうなんちゅうおう）
Kōnandai Station	港南台駅（こうなんだい）
Kōnan-Yamate Station	甲南山手駅（こうなんやまて）
Konashi Station	小梨駅（こなし）
Konba Station	今羽駅（こんば）
Konbu Station	昆布駅（こんぶ）
Konbumori Station	昆布盛駅（こんぶもり）
Kongō Station	金剛駅（こんごう）
Konkou Station	金光駅（こんこう）
Konno Station	木尾駅（こんの）
Kōnodai Station	国府台駅（こうのだい）
Konoha Station	木葉駅（このは）
Kōnohara-Enshin Station	河野原円心駅（こうのはらえんしん）
Kōnoikeshinden Station	鴻池新田駅（こうのいけしんでん）
Kōnokawa Station	高野川駅（こうのかわ）
Kōnomiya Station	国府宮駅（こうのみや）
Kōnosu Station	鴻巣駅（こうのす）
Kōnotori-no-sato Station	コウノトリの郷駅（こうのとりのさと）
Konoura Station	金浦駅（このうら）
Kōnoyama Station	鴻野山駅（こうのやま）
Kōnu Station	甲奴駅（こうぬ）
Konpiramae Station	金比羅前駅（こんぴらまえ）
Konzōji Station	金蔵寺駅（こんぞうじ）
Kōge Station	郡家駅（こおげ）
Kōrakuen Station	後楽園駅（こうらくえん）
Koremasa Station	是政駅（これまさ）
Kori Station	古里駅 (東京都)（こり）
Kōri Station	桑折駅（こおり）
Kōrien Station	香里園駅（こうりえん）
Kōrimoto Station (JR Kyushu)	郡元駅（こおりもと）
Kōrimoto Station (Kagoshima City Tram)	郡元停留場（こおりもと）
Kōritsubyōinmae Station	公立病院前駅（こうりつびょういんまえ）
Kōriyama Station (Fukushima)	郡山駅 (福島県)（こおりやま）
Kōriyama Station (Nara)	郡山駅 (奈良県)（こおりやま）
Kōriyama Kamotsu Terminal Station	郡山貨物ターミナル駅（こおりやまかもつたーみなる）
Kōriyamatomita Station	郡山富田駅（こおりやまとみた）
Kōro Station	香呂駅（こうろ）
Kōroen Station	香櫨園駅（こうろえん）
Kosagawa Station	小砂川駅（こさがわ）
Kosagoe Station	小佐越駅（こさごえ）
Kosano Station	小佐野駅（こさの）
Kōsei Station	甲西駅（こうせい）
Koshibe Station	越部駅（こしべ）
Koshido Station	越戸駅（こしど）
Kōshien Station	甲子園駅（こうしえん）
Kōshienguchi Station	甲子園口駅（こうしえんぐち）
Koshigahama Station	越ヶ浜駅（こしがはま）
Koshigaya Station	越谷駅（こしがや）
Koshigaya-Laketown Station	越谷レイクタウン駅（こしがやれいくたうん）
Koshigoe Station	腰越駅（こしごえ）
Koshimizu Station	越水駅（こしみず）
Kōshinzuka Station	庚申塚駅（こうしんづか）
Kōshiyama Station	神志山駅（こうしやま）
Kōshunai Station	光珠内駅（こうしゅない）
Kōshūkaidō Station	甲州街道駅（こうしゅうかいどう）
Kōsoku-Kōbe Station	高速神戸駅（こうそくこうべ）
Kōsoku-Nagata Station	高速長田駅（こうそくながた）
Kosuge Station	小菅駅（こすげ）
Kosugi Station (Imizu, Toyama)	小杉駅 (富山県射水市)（こすぎ）
Kosugi Station (Toyama, Toyama)	小杉駅 (富山市)（こすぎ）
Kosugō Station	越河駅（こすごう）
Kōtachi Station	甲立駅（こうたち）
Kotake Station	小竹駅（こたけ）
Kotake-Mukaihara Station	小竹向原駅（こたけむかいはら）
Kotaki Station	小滝駅（こたき）
Kotesashi Station	小手指駅（こてさし）
Kotobuki Station	寿駅（ことぶき）
Kōtōdai-Kōen Station	勾当台公園駅（こうとうだいこうえん）
Kotoden-Kotohira Station	琴電琴平駅（ことでんことひら）
Kotoden-Shido Station	琴電志度駅（ことでんしど）
Kotoden-Yashima Station	琴電屋島駅（ことでんやしま）
Kōtōen Station	甲東園駅（こうとうえん）
Kotohira Station	琴平駅（ことひら）
Kotoni Station (JR Hokkaido)	琴似駅 (JR北海道)（ことに）
Kotoni Station (Sapporo Municipal Subway)	琴似駅 (札幌市営地下鉄)（ことに）
Kotoshiba Station	琴芝駅（ことしば）
Kotō Station	厚東駅（ことう）
Kōtsū Center mae Station	交通センター前駅（こうつうせんたーまえ）
Kotsuka Station	古津賀駅（こつか）
Kōtsūkyokumae Station	交通局前停留場 (熊本県)（こうつうきょくまえ）
Kotsunagi Station	小繋駅（こつなぎ）
Kotsuyōsui Station	木津用水駅（こつようすい）
Kottoi Station	特牛駅（こっとい）
Koumi Station	小海駅（こうみ）
Koura Station	小浦駅 (長崎県)（こうら）
Kouchiumi Station	小内海駅（こうちうみ）
Kōwa Station	河和駅（こうわ）
Kowada Station	小和田駅（こわだ）
Kōwaguchi Station	河和口駅（こうわぐち）
Kowakidani Station	小涌谷駅（こわきだに）
Kowashōzu Station	小和清水駅（こわしょうず）
Kowata Station	木幡駅 (京阪)（こわた）
Kōya Station (Chiba)	幸谷駅（こうや）
Kōya Station (Tokyo)	高野駅 (東京都)（こうや）
Kōyadai Station	荒野台駅（こうやだい）
Kōyaguchi Station	高野口駅（こうやぐち）
Koyama Station	湖山駅（こやま）
Koyamatsu Station	小谷松駅（こやまつ）
Koyanagi Station	小柳駅 (青森県)（こやなぎ）
Koyanohata Station	小屋の畑駅（こやのはた）
Koyanose Station	木屋瀬駅（こやのせ）
Kōyasan Station	高野山駅（こうやさん）
Kōyashita Station	高野下駅（こうやした）
Koyasu Station	子安駅（こやす）
Koyaura Station	小屋浦駅（こやうら）
Kōyodo Station	香淀駅（こうよど）
Kōyōdai Station	光洋台駅（こうようだい）
Kōyōen Station	甲陽園駅（こうようえん）
Koyoshi Station	子吉駅（こよし）
Koyūkan-Shineki Station	湖遊館新駅駅（こゆうかんしんえき）
Koza Station	古座駅（こざ）
Kōzai Station	香西駅（こうざい）
Kozakai Station	小坂井駅（こざかい）
Kōzaki Station (Ōita)	幸崎駅（こうざき）
Kōzaki Station (Wakayama)	神前駅 (和歌山県)（こうざき）
Kōza-Shibuya Station	高座渋谷駅（こうざしぶや）
Kozawa Station	小沢駅（こざわ）
Kōzenji Station	光善寺駅（こうぜんじ）
Kōzōji Station	高蔵寺駅（こうぞうじ）
Kōzu Station (Osaka)	郡津駅（こうづ）
Kōzu Station (Kanagawa)	国府津駅（こうづ）
Kōzuki Station	上月駅（こうづき）
Kozukue Station	小机駅（こづくえ）
Kōzunomori Station	公津の杜駅（こうづのもり）
Kozurushinden Station	小鶴新田駅（こづるしんでん）
Kozuya Station	小鳥谷駅（こずや）

=== Ku - Ky ===
Kuba Station	玖波駅（くば）
Kubara Station	久原駅（くばら）
Kubiki Station	くびき駅（くびき）
Kubiki-Ōno Station	頸城大野駅（くびきおおの）
Kubochō Station	久保町駅（くぼちょう）
Kubokawa Station	窪川駅（くぼかわ）
Kubota Station (Akita)	久保田駅 (秋田県)（くぼた）
Kubota Station (Saga)	久保田駅 (佐賀県)（くぼた）
Kuchiba Station	口羽駅（くちば）
Kudamatsu Station	下松駅 (山口県)（くだまつ）
Kudanshita Station	九段下駅（くだんした）
Kudoyama Station	九度山駅（くどやま）
Kuga Station	玖珂駅（くが）
Kugahara Station (Tokyo)	久が原駅（くがはら）
Kugahara Station (Chiba)	久我原駅（くがはら）
Kugayama Station	久我山駅（くがやま）
Kugemura Station	久下村駅（くげむら）
Kugenuma Station	鵠沼駅（くげぬま）
Kugenuma-Kaigan Station	鵠沼海岸駅（くげぬまかいがん）
Kugeta Station	久下田駅（くげた）
Kuguhara Station	久々原駅（くぐはら）
Kuguno Station	久々野駅（くぐの）
Kuhombutsu Station	九品仏駅（くほんぶつ）
Kuhonjikōsaten Station	九品寺交差点駅（くほんじこうさてん）
Kuinabashi Station	くいな橋駅（くいなばし）
Kuise Station	杭瀬駅（くいせ）
Kuji Station (Iwate)	久慈駅（くじ）
Kuji Station (Kanagawa)	久地駅（くじ）
Kujiranami Station	鯨波駅（くじらなみ）
Kujō Station (Kyoto)	九条駅 (京都府)（くじょう）
Kujō Station (Nara)	九条駅 (奈良県)（くじょう）
Kujō Station (Osaka)	九条駅 (大阪府)（くじょう）
Kuki Station (Saitama)	久喜駅（くき）
Kuki Station (Mie)	九鬼駅（くき）
Kūkō-dōri Station	空港通り駅（くうこうどおり）
Kumagane Station	熊ヶ根駅（くまがね）
Kumagawa Station	熊川駅（くまがわ）
Kumagaya Station	熊谷駅（くまがや）
Kumagaya Kamotsu Terminal Station	熊谷貨物ターミナル駅（くまがやかもつたーみなる）
Kumamoto Station	熊本駅（くまもと）
Kumamoto Castle / City Hall Station	熊本城・市役所前停留場（くまもとじょうしやくしょまえ）
Kumamoto-eki-mae Station	熊本駅前駅（くまもとえきまえ）
Kumamotokōsen-mae Station	熊本高専前駅（くまもとこうせんまえ）
Kumanishi Station	熊西駅（くまにし）
Kumanojō Station	隈之城駅（くまのじょう）
Kumanomae Station	熊野前駅（くまのまえ）
Kumanoshi Station	熊野市駅（くまのし）
Kumasaki Station	熊崎駅（くまさき）
Kumatori Station	熊取駅（くまとり）
Kumayama Station	熊山駅（くまやま）
Kume Station	久米駅（くめ）
Kumeda Station	久米田駅（くめだ）
Kumegawa Station	久米川駅（くめがわ）
Kumihama Station	久美浜駅（くみはま）
Kumoi Station	雲井駅（くもい）
Kumonmyō Station	公文明駅（くもんみょう）
Kumura Station	玖村駅（くむら）
Kunado Station	久那土駅（くなど）
Kunda Station	栗田駅（くんだ）
Kunebetsu Station	久根別駅（くねべつ）
Kunifusa Station	国英駅（くにふさ）
Kunijima Station	柴島駅（くにじま）
Kunimi Station (Kochi)	国見駅 (高知県)（くにみ）
Kunimi Station (Miyagi)	国見駅 (宮城県)（くにみ）
Kunisada Station	国定駅（くにさだ）
Kunitachi Station	国立駅（くにたち）
Kuniya Station	国谷駅（くにや）
Kuniyoshi Station	国吉駅（くによし）
Kunnui Station	国縫駅（くんぬい）
Kunugiyama Station	くぬぎ山駅（くぬぎやま）
Kuragano Station	倉賀野駅（くらがの）
Kurahashi Station	倉橋駅（くらはし）
Kurakuenguchi Station	苦楽園口駅（くらくえんぐち）
Kurama Station	鞍馬駅（くらま）
Kuramae Station	蔵前駅（くらまえ）
Kuramaguchi Station	鞍馬口駅（くらまぐち）
Kurami Station	倉見駅（くらみ）
Kuramoto Station (Nagano)	倉本駅（くらもと）
Kuramoto Station (Tokushima)	蔵本駅（くらもと）
Kuranaga Station	倉永駅（くらなが）
Kurashiki Station	倉敷駅（くらしき）
Kurashikishi Station	倉敷市駅（くらしきし）
Kurate Station	鞍手駅（くらて）
Kurauchi Station	蔵内駅（くらうち）
Kurayoshi Station	倉吉駅（くらよし）
Kure-Portopia Station	呉ポートピア駅（くれぽーとぴあ）
Kure Station	呉駅（くれ）
Kureha Station	呉羽駅（くれは）
Kurihama Station	久里浜駅（くりはま）
Kurihara Tamachi Station	栗原田町駅（くりはらたまち）
Kurihashi Station	栗橋駅（くりはし）
Kurihira Station	栗平駅（くりひら）
Kurikara Station	倶利伽羅駅（くりから）
Kurikoma Station	栗駒駅（くりこま）
Kurikoma-Kōgen Station	くりこま高原駅（くりこまこうげん）
Kurikuma Station	栗熊駅（くりくま）
Kurino Station	栗野駅（くりの）
Kurioka Station	栗丘駅（くりおか）
Kurisawa Station	栗沢駅（くりさわ）
Kuriyagawa Station	厨川駅（くりやがわ）
Kuriyama Station	栗山駅（くりやま）
Kurōbaru Station	九郎原駅（くろうばる）
Kurobe Station	黒部駅（くろべ）
Kurobe-Unazukionsen Station	黒部宇奈月温泉駅（くろべうなづきおんせん）
Kuroda Station (Aichi)	黒田駅 (愛知県)（くろだ）
Kuroda Station (Nara)	黒田駅 (奈良県)（くろだ）
Kurodahara Station	黒田原駅（くろだはら）
Kurodashō Station	黒田庄駅（くろだしょう）
Kuroe Station	黒江駅（くろえ）
Kurogo Station	黒子駅（くろご）
Kurogō Station	黒川駅 (佐賀県)（くろごう）
Kurohime Station	黒姫駅（くろひめ）
Kuroi Station (Hyogo)	黒井駅 (兵庫県)（くろい）
Kuroi Station (Niigata)	黒井駅 (新潟県)（くろい）
Kuroimura Station	黒井村駅（くろいむら）
Kuroishi Station (Aomori)	黒石駅 (青森県)（くろいし）
Kuroishi Station (Kumamoto)	黒石駅 (熊本県)（くろいし）
Kuroiso Station	黒磯駅（くろいそ）
Kuroiwa Station	黒岩駅（くろいわ）
Kurokamimachi Station	黒髪町駅（くろかみまち）
Kurokawa Station (Aichi)	黒川駅 (愛知県)（くろかわ）
Kurokawa Station (Hyogo)	黒川駅 (兵庫県)（くろかわ）
Kurokawa Station (Kagawa)	黒川駅 (香川県)（くろかわ）
Kurokawa Station (Kanagawa)	黒川駅 (神奈川県)（くろかわ）
Kuromatsu Station (Miyagi)	黒松駅 (宮城県)（くろまつ）
Kuromatsu Station (Shimane)	黒松駅 (島根県)（くろまつ）
Kuromatsunai Station	黒松内駅（くろまつない）
Kurosaka Station	黒坂駅（くろさか）
Kurosaki Station	黒崎駅（くろさき）
Kurosakiekimae Station	黒崎駅前駅（くろさきえきまえ）
Kurosawa Station (Yokote, Akita)	黒沢駅 (秋田県横手市)（くろさわ）
Kurosawa Station (Yurihonjō, Akita)	黒沢駅 (秋田県由利本荘市)（くろさわ）
Kuroyama Station	黒山駅（くろやま）
Kurozasa Station	黒笹駅（くろざさ）
Kurumamichi Station	車道駅（くるまみち）
Kurumazaki-Jinja Station	車折神社駅（くるまざきじんじゃ）
Kurume Station	久留米駅（くるめ）
Kurume-daigaku-mae Station	久留米大学前駅（くるめだいがくまえ）
Kurume-Kōkōmae Station	久留米高校前駅（くるめこうこうまえ）
Kururi Station	久留里駅（くるり）
Kusae Station	草江駅（くさえ）
Kusaka Station	日下駅（くさか）
Kusami Station	朽網駅（くさみ）
Kusamichi Station	草道駅（くさみち）
Kusanagi Station (JR Central)	草薙駅 (JR東海)（くさなぎ）
Kusanagi Station (Shizuoka Railway)	草薙駅 (静岡鉄道)（くさなぎ）
Kusano Station (Fukushima)	草野駅 (福島県)（くさの）
Kusano Station (Hyogo)	草野駅 (兵庫県)（くさの）
Kusatsu Station (Hiroshima)	草津駅 (広島県)（くさつ）
Kusatsu Station (Shiga)	草津駅 (滋賀県)（くさつ）
Kusatsu-minami Station	草津南駅（くさつみなみ）
Kuse Station	久世駅（くせ）
Kushi Station	串駅（くし）
Kushida Station	櫛田駅（くしだ）
Kushigahama Station	櫛ヶ浜駅（くしがはま）
Kushikino Station	串木野駅（くしきの）
Kushima Station	串間駅（くしま）
Kushimoto Station	串本駅（くしもと）
Kushiro Station (Shimane)	久代駅（くしろ）
Kushiro Station (Hokkaido)	釧路駅（くしろ）
Kushiroshitsugen Station	釧路湿原駅（くしろしつげん）
Kushiwara Station	櫛原駅（くしわら）
Kusu Station	楠駅（くす）
Kusubashi Station	楠橋駅（くすばし）
Kusugawa Station	久寿川駅（くすがわ）
Kusuku Station	楠久駅（くすく）
Kusurimizu Station	薬水駅（くすりみず）
Kutani Station	久谷駅（くたに）
Kutano Station	久田野駅（くたの）
Kutchan Station	倶知安駅（くっちゃん）
Kute Station	久手駅 （くて）
Kutsukake Station	沓掛駅（くつかけ）
Kutsukawa Station	久津川駅（くつかわ）
Kuwagawa Station	桑川駅（くわがわ）
Kuwamachi Station	桑町駅（くわまち）
Kuwana Station	桑名駅（くわな）
Kuwanagawa Station	桑名川駅（くわながわ）
Kuwano Station	桑野駅（くわの）
Kuzakai Station	区界駅（くざかい）
Kuzaki Station	久崎駅（くざき）
Kuzu Station	葛駅（くず）
Kuzuha Station	樟葉駅（くずは）
Kuzumi Station	久住駅（くずみ）
Kuzuoka Station	葛岡駅（くずおか）
Kuzuryūko Station	九頭竜湖駅（くずりゅうこ）
Kuzuu Station	葛生駅（くずう）
Kyarabashi Station	伽羅橋駅（きゃらばし）
Kyōbashi Station (Osaka)	京橋駅 (大阪府)（きょうばし）
Kyōbashi Station (Tokyo)	京橋駅 (東京都)（きょうばし）
Kyōbate Station	京終駅（きょうばて）
Kyōden Station	経田駅（きょうでん）
Kyōdō Station	経堂駅（きょうどう）
Kyōgase Station	京ヶ瀬駅（きょうがせ）
Kyōguchi Station	京口駅（きょうぐち）
Kyōikudaimae Station	教育大前駅（きょういくだいまえ）
Kyōkaimae Station	教会前駅（きょうかいまえ）
Kyōmachionsen Station	京町温泉駅（きょうまちおんせん）
Kyocera-mae Station	京セラ前駅（きょうせらまえ）
Kyōshi Station	孝子駅（きょうし）
Kyōtanabe Station	京田辺駅（きょうたなべ）
Kyōtango-Ōmiya Station	京丹後大宮駅（きょうたんごおおみや）
Kyōteijō-mae Station	競艇場前駅 (東京都)（きょうていじょうまえ）
Kyoto Station	京都駅（きょうと）
Kyoto-kawaramachi Station	京都河原町駅（きょうとかわらまち）
Kyoto Seikadai-mae Station	京都精華大前駅（きょうとせいかだいまえ）
Kyoto-Shiyakusho-mae Station	京都市役所前駅（きょうとしやくしょまえ）
Kyōwa Station	共和駅（きょうわ）
Kyozuka Station	経塚駅（きょうづか）
Kyūdai-gakkentoshi Station	九大学研都市駅（きゅうだいがっけんとし）
Kyūhōji Station	久宝寺駅（きゅうほうじ）
Kyūhōjiguchi Station	久宝寺口駅（きゅうほうじぐち）
Kyūjōmae Station (Kochi)	球場前駅 (高知県)（きゅうじょうまえ）
Kyūjōmae Station (Okayama)	球場前駅 (岡山県)（きゅうじょうまえ）
Kyūkan Iryō Center-mae Station	急患医療センター前停留場（きゅうかんいりょうせんたーまえ）
Kyūkyoryūchi-Daimarumae Station	旧居留地・大丸前駅（きゅうきょりゅうちだいまるまえ）
Kyūragi Station	厳木駅（きゅうらぎ）
Kyūsandaimae Station	九産大前駅（きゅうさんだいまえ）
Kyūsendō Station	球泉洞駅（きゅうせんどう）
Kyūshirataki Station	旧白滝駅（きゅうしらたき）
Kyūshū-kōdai-mae Station	九州工大前駅（きゅうしゅうこうだいまえ）
Kyūshū Tetsudō Kinenkan Station	九州鉄道記念館駅（きゅうしゅうてつどうきねんかん）

=== L ===
Lavender Farm Station	ラベンダー畑駅（らべんだーばたけ）
