= Kita-Sanjūyo-Jō Station =

Subway station in Sapporo, Japan

Coordinates: 43°5′59.887″N 141°20′32.160″E

N02 Kita-Sanjūyo-Jō Station 北34条駅
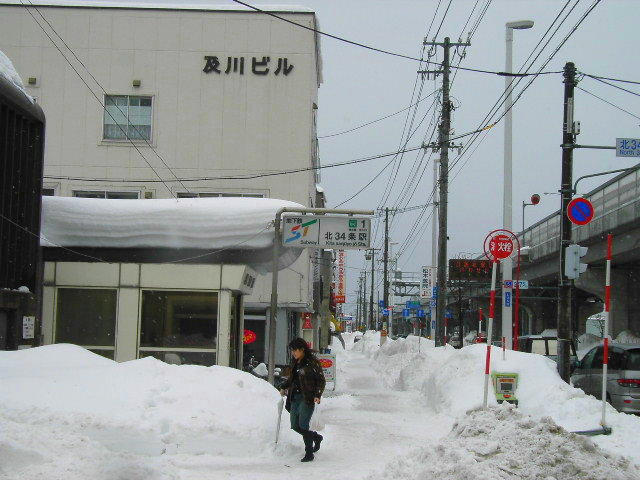
- Station exit

General information
- Location: Kita, Sapporo, Hokkaido; Japan
- System: Sapporo Municipal Subway station
- Operator: Sapporo City Transportation Bureau
- Line: Namboku Line

Construction
- Accessible: Yes

Other information
- Station code: N02

History
- Opened: March 16, 1978; 48 years ago

Services
Preceding station	Sapporo Municipal Subway	Following station
Asabu N01 Terminus	Namboku Line	Kita-Nijūyo-Jō N03 towards Makomanai
Location
- Location within Hokkaido Location within Japan

Kita-Sanjūyo-Jō Station (Japanese: 北34条駅; lit. '"North 34th Street Station"') is a Sapporo Municipal Subway station in Kita-ku, Sapporo, Hokkaido, Japan. The station number is N02.

== Platforms ==
1	■ Namboku Line	for Makomanai
2	■ Namboku Line	for Asabu

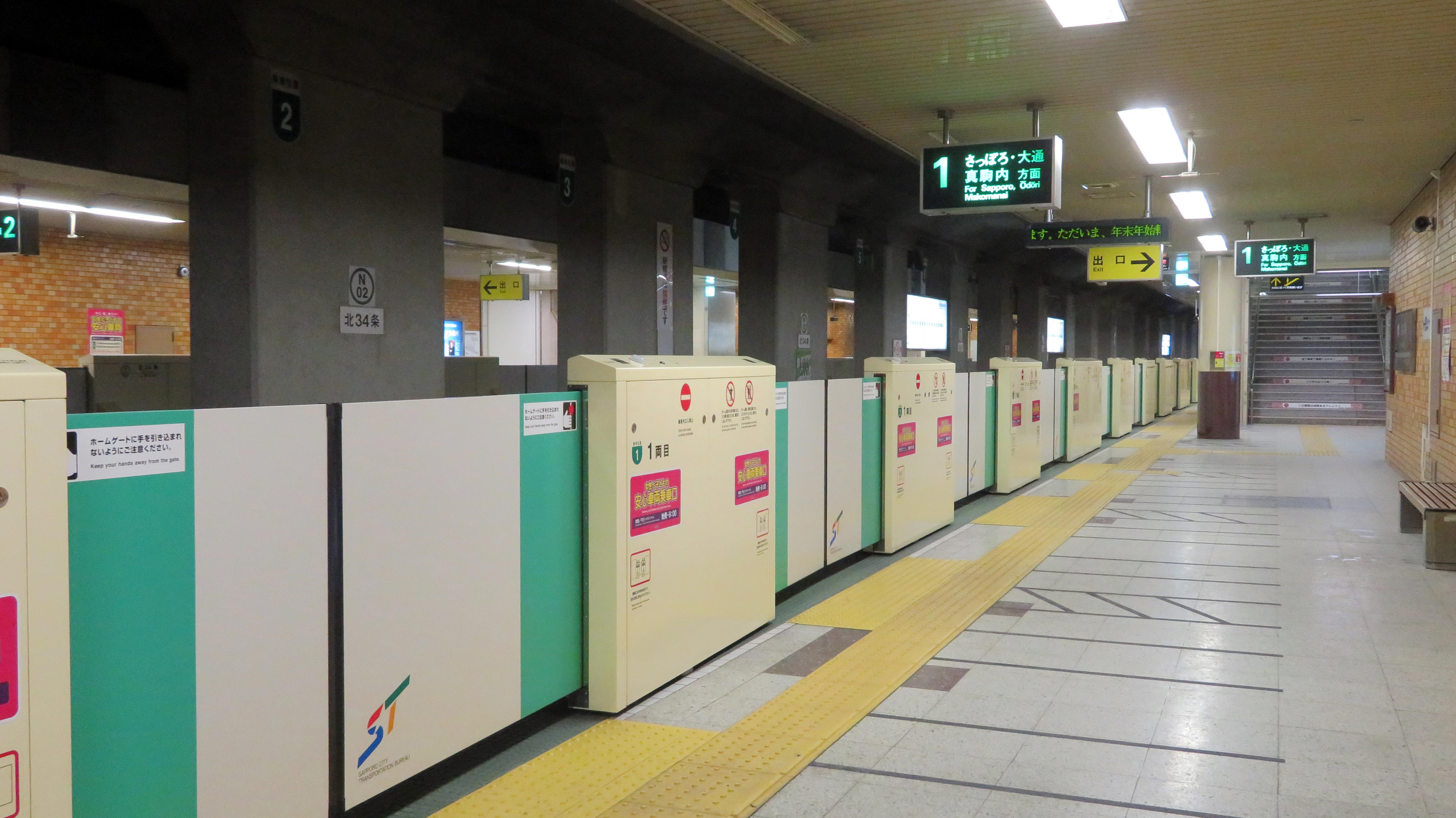
Station platforms

== Surrounding area ==
- Japan National Route 5, (to Hakodate)
- Japan National Route 274, (to Shibecha)
- Post Office, Sapporo Kita-Sanjūyo-Jō
- Police Station, Kita-Sanjūyo-Jō Post
- Sapporo Justice Bureau, Kita branch
- Best Denki, Sapporo branch
- Sapporo shinkin Bank, Kita branch

== History ==
The station opened on 16 March 1978 coinciding with the extension of the Namboku Line from Asabu Station to Kita-Nijuyo-Jo Station.
