= Kamitode Station =

Railway station in Fukuyama, Hiroshima Prefecture, Japan

Kamitode Station 上戸手駅
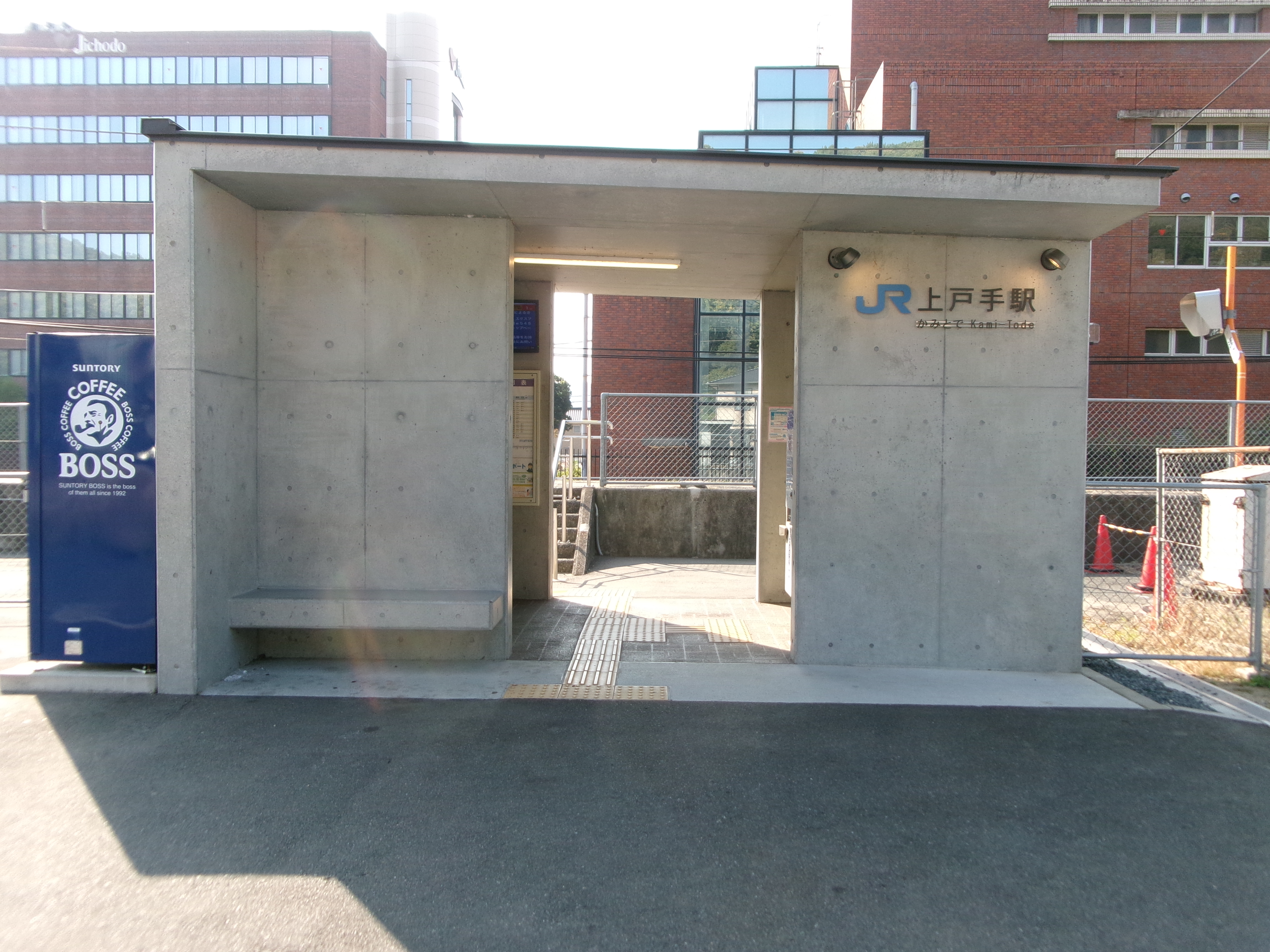
- Kamitode Station, November 2023

General information
- Location: 261-2 Tode Shinichi-chō, Fukuyama-shi, Hiroshima-ken 729-3101; Japan
- Coordinates: 34°33′5.96″N 133°16′54.79″E
- Owner: West Japan Railway Company
- Operator: West Japan Railway Company
- Line: Z Fukuen Line
- Distance: 18.8 km (11.7 miles) from Fukuyama
- Platforms: 1 side platform
- Tracks: 1
- Connections: Bus stop

Construction
- Structure type: Ground level
- Accessible: Yes

Other information
- Status: Unstaffed
- Website: Official website

History
- Opened: 21 July 1914
- Former names: Ryōbitennō (to 1933)

Services
Preceding station	JR West	Following station
Shin-ichi towards Miyoshi	Fukuen Line Local	Tode towards Fukuyama
Location
- Location within Hiroshima Prefecture Location within Japan

Kamitode Station (上戸手駅, Kamitode-eki) is a passenger railway station located in the city of Fukuyama, Hiroshima Prefecture, Japan. It is operated by the West Japan Railway Company (JR West).

== Lines ==
Kamitode Station is served by the JR West Fukuen Line, and is located 18.8 kilometers from the terminus of the line at Fukuyama.

== Station layout ==
The station consists of side side platform serving a single bi-directional track. A new concrete waiting room was constructed in February 2021. The station is unattended.

== History ==
Kamitode Station was opened on 21 July 1914 as Ryōbitennō Station (両備天王駅). It was renamed to its present name on 1 September 1933. With the privatization of the Japanese National Railways (JNR) on 1 April 1987, the station came under the control of JR West.

== Surrounding area ==
- Susanoo Shrine (ichinomiya of Bingo Province)
- Teraoka Memorial Hospital
- Hiroshima Prefectural Tode High School

== See also ==
- List of railway stations in Japan
