= Kamihori Station =

Railway station in Toyama, Toyama Prefecture, Japan

Kamihori Station 上堀駅
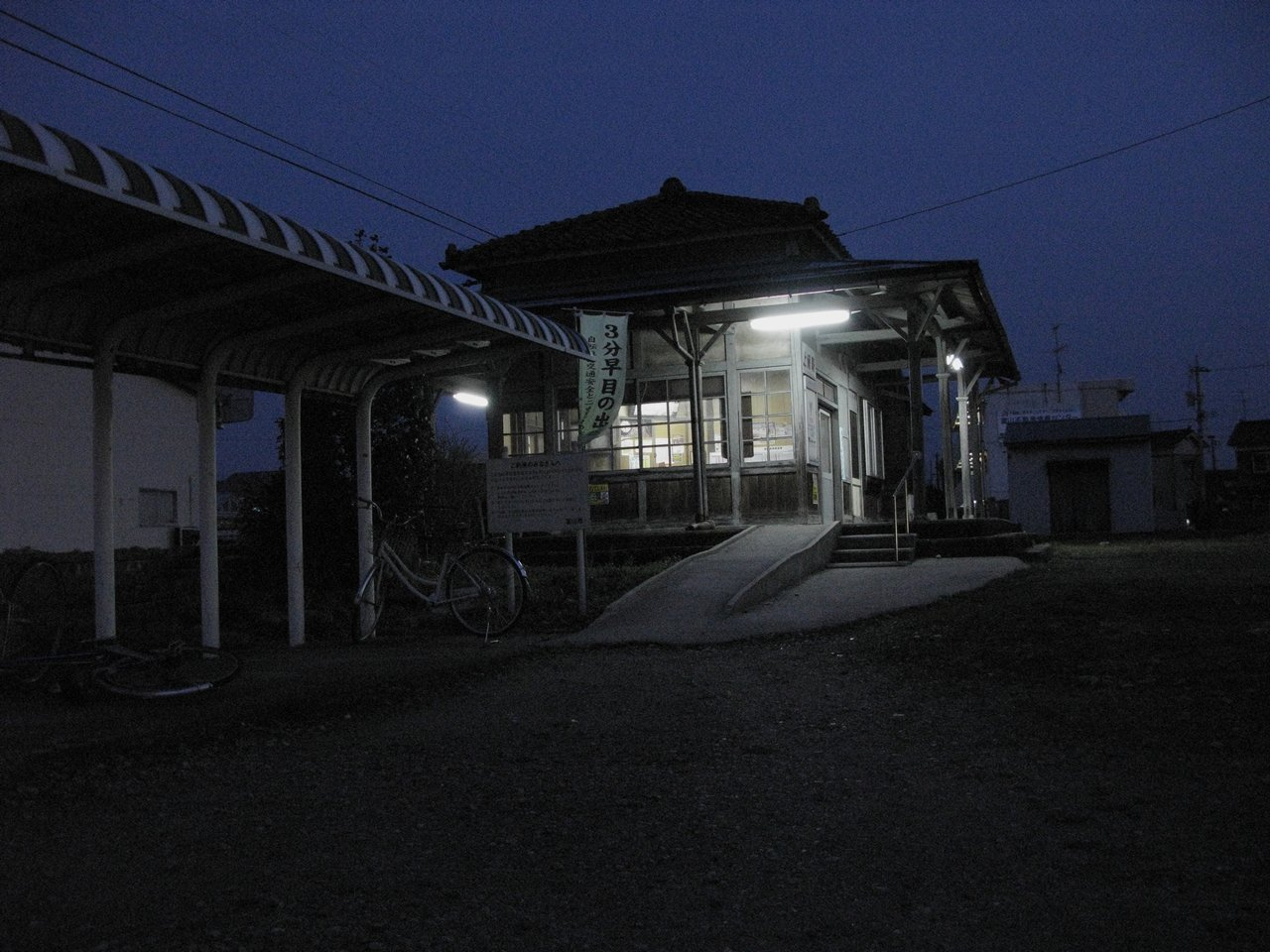
- Kamihori Station at night

General information
- Location: 61 Hori, Toyama-shi Toyama-ken 939-8057; Japan
- Coordinates: 36.6533°N 137.2301°E
- Operator: Toyama Chihō Railway
- Line: ■ Kamidaki Line
- Distance: 2.1 from Minami-Toyama
- Platforms: 1 side platform
- Tracks: 1

Other information
- Status: Unstaffed
- Website: Official website

History
- Opened: 25 April 1921

Passengers
- FY2015: 281
Location
- Location within Japan

Kamihori Station (上堀駅, Kamihori-eki) is a railway station in the city of Toyama, Toyama Prefecture, Japan, operated by the private railway operator Toyama Chihō Railway.

== Lines ==
Kamihori Station is served by the Toyama Chihō Railway Kamidaki Line, and is 2.1 kilometers from the starting point of the line at Minami-Toyama.

== Station layout ==
The station has one ground-level side platform serving a single bi-directional track. The station is unattended.

== History ==
Kamihori Station was opened on 25 April 1921.

== Adjacent stations ==
«	Service	»
Toyama Chihō Railway Kamidaki Line
Asanamachi	-	Kosugi

== Surrounding area ==
- Kamihori Post Office

== Passenger statistics ==
In fiscal 2015, the station was used by 281 passengers daily.

== See also ==
- List of railway stations in Japan
