= Kotoshiba Station =

Railway station in Ube, Yamaguchi Prefecture, Japan

Kotoshiba Station 琴芝駅
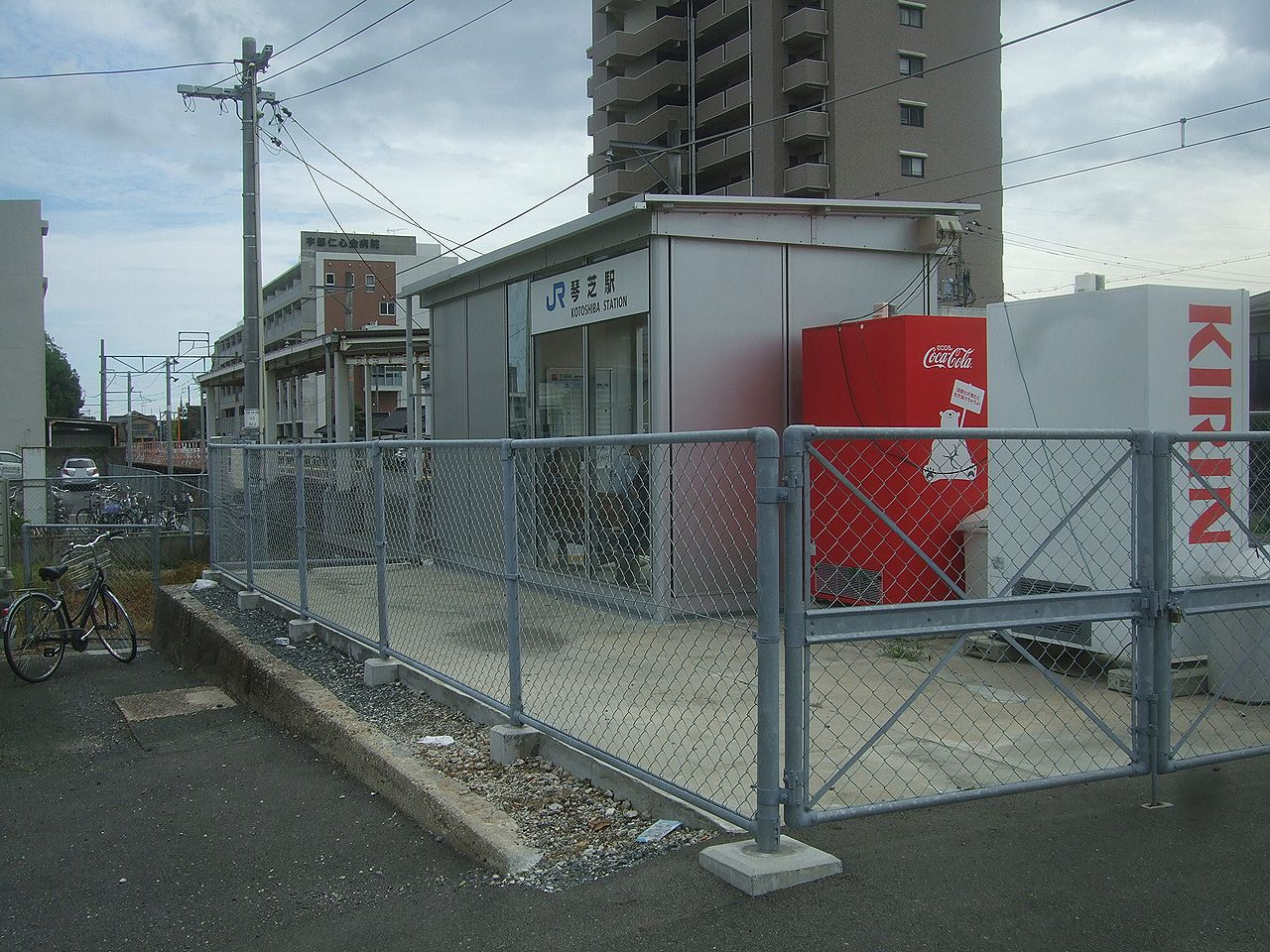
- Kotoshiba Station in 2020

General information
- Location: 2-chōme-6 Kotoshibachō, Ube-shi, Yamaguchi-ken 755-0033; Japan
- Coordinates: 33°57′10.83″N 131°15′6.77″E
- Owner: West Japan Railway Company
- Operator: West Japan Railway Company
- Line: Ube Line
- Distance: 26.0 km (16.2 miles) from Shin-Yamaguchi
- Platforms: 1 island platform
- Tracks: 1
- Connections: Bus stop

Other information
- Status: Unstaffed
- Website: Official website

History
- Opened: 29 November 1929; 96 years ago

Passengers
- FY2020: 614

Services
Preceding station	JR West	Following station
Higashi-Shinkawa towards Shin-Yamaguchi	Ube Line Local	Ube-Shinkawa towards Ube
Location
- Location within Yamaguchi Prefecture Location within Japan

Kotoshiba Station (琴芝駅, Kotoshiba-eki) is a passenger railway station located in the city of Ube, Yamaguchi Prefecture, Japan. It is operated by the West Japan Railway Company (JR West).

== Lines ==
Kotoshiba Station is served by the JR West Ube Line, and is located 26.0 kilometers from the terminus of the line at Shin-Yamaguchi.

== Station layout ==
The station consists of one ground-level unnumbered side platform serving a single bi-directional track. The station is unattended.

== History ==
Kiwa Station was opened on 29 November 1929. The line was nationalized in 1943, becoming the Ube Higashi Line, and was renamed the Ube Line on 1 February 1948. With the privatization of the Japan National Railway (JNR) on 1 April 1987, the station came under the aegis of the West Japan railway Company (JR West). The wooden station building was demolished in 2020 and replaced by a small prefabricated waiting room.

== Passenger statistics ==
In fiscal 2020, the station was used by an average of 614 passengers daily.

== Surrounding area ==
- Ube City Hall
- Yamaguchi Prefecture Ube General Government Building
- Yamaguchi District Court Ube Branch

== See also ==
- List of railway stations in Japan
