= Kanameta Station =

Railway station in Tamura, Fukushima Prefecture, Japan

Kanameta Station 要田駅
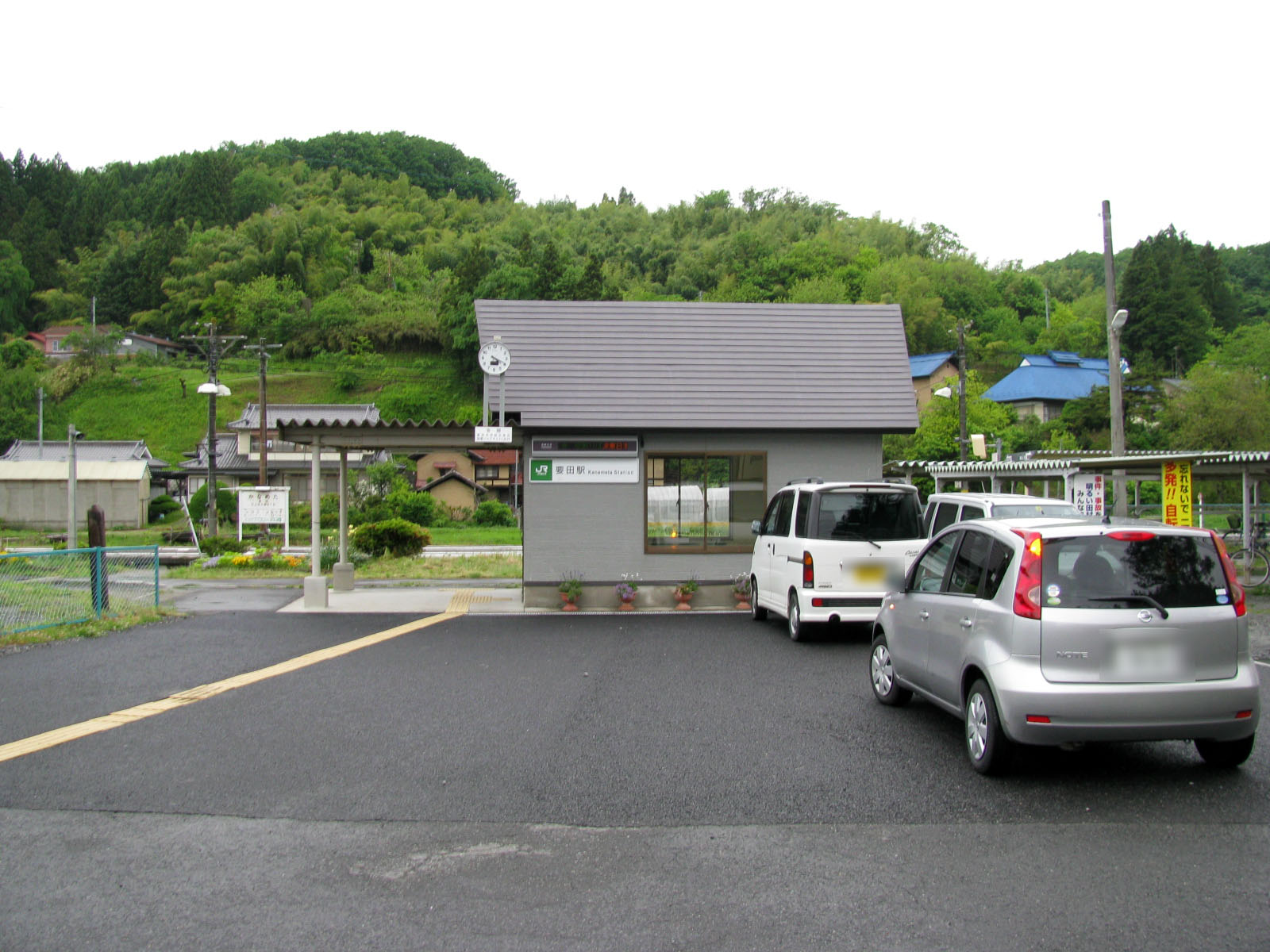
- Kanameta Station in May 2008

General information
- Location: Kanameta Teramukai 69, Tamura-shi, Fukushima-ken 963-4323; Japan
- Coordinates: 37.4537°N 140.5209°E
- Operator: JR East
- Line: ■ Ban'etsu East Line
- Distance: 69.5 km from Iwaki
- Platforms: 1 island platform

Other information
- Status: Unstaffed
- Website: Official website

History
- Opened: January 1, 1950

Passengers
- FY2004: 151

Services
| Preceding station | JR East | Following station |
|---|---|---|
| Miharu towards Kōriyama | Ban'etsu East Line Local | Funehiki towards Iwaki |
Location
- Location within Fukushima Prefecture Location within Japan

Kanameta Station (要田駅, Kanameta-eki) is a railway station in the city of Tamura, Fukushima Prefecture, Fukushima Prefecture, Japan, operated by East Japan Railway Company (JR East).

== Lines ==
Kanameta Station is served by the Ban'etsu East Line, and is located 69.5 rail kilometers from the official starting point of the line at Iwaki.

== Station layout ==
The station has a single island platform connected to the station building by a level crossing. The station is unstaffed.

=== Platforms ===
| 1 | ■ Ban'etsu East Line | for Miharu and Kōriyama |
| 2 | ■ Ban'etsu East Line | for Ononiimachi and Iwaki |

== History ==
Kanameta Station opened on January 1, 1950. The station was absorbed into the JR East network upon the privatization of the Japanese National Railways (JNR) on April 1, 1987. On March 11, 1989, it became fully automated and on March 3, 2009, started accepting the Suica card.

== Surrounding area ==
- National Route 288
- Kanameta Post Office
- Kanameta Onsen

== See also ==
- List of railway stations in Japan
