= Katase-Shirata Station =

Railway station in Higashiizu, Shizuoka Prefecture, Japan

Katase-Shirata Station 片瀬白田駅
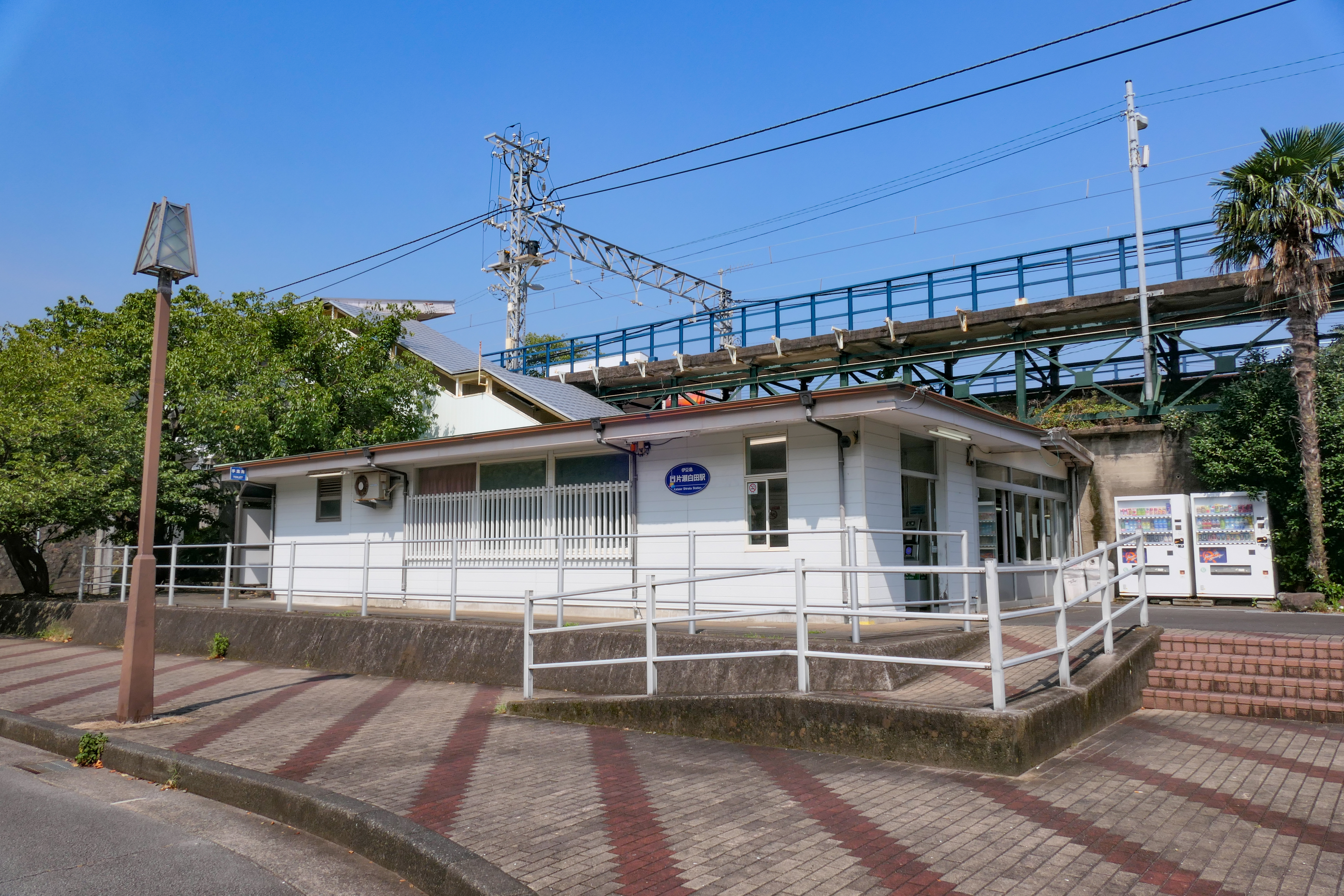
- Exterior of Katase-Shirata Station

General information
- Location: Shirata, Higashiizu-cho, Kamo-gun, Shizuoka-ken 413-0304; Japan
- Coordinates: 34°48′08″N 139°3′40″E
- Operator: Izukyū Corporation
- Line: ■ Izu Kyūkō Line
- Distance: 26.1 kilometers from Itō
- Platforms: 2 side platforms

Other information
- Status: Staffed
- Station code: IZ10

History
- Opened: December 10, 1961.

Passengers
- FY2017: 198 daily
Location
- Location within Shizuoka Prefecture Location within Japan

Katase-Shirata Station (片瀬白田駅, Katase-Shirata-eki) is a railway station in the town of Higashiizu, Shizuoka Prefecture, Japan, operated by the privately owned Izu Kyūkō Line .

== Lines ==
Katase-Shirata Station is served by the Izu Kyūkō Line, and is located 26.1 kilometers from the official starting point of the line at Itō and is 43.0 kilometers from Atami.

== Station layout ==
Katase-Shirata Station has two elevated opposing side platforms serving two tracks on an embankment. The platforms are connected by a level crossing, and the station building is at a lower level to one side. The station is staffed.

=== Platforms ===
1	■ Izu Kyūkō Line	Izu-Inatori ・ Kawazu ・ Izukyū Shimoda
2	■ Izu Kyūkō Line	Itō ・ Izu-Kōgen・ Atami・ Yokohama・ Tokyo

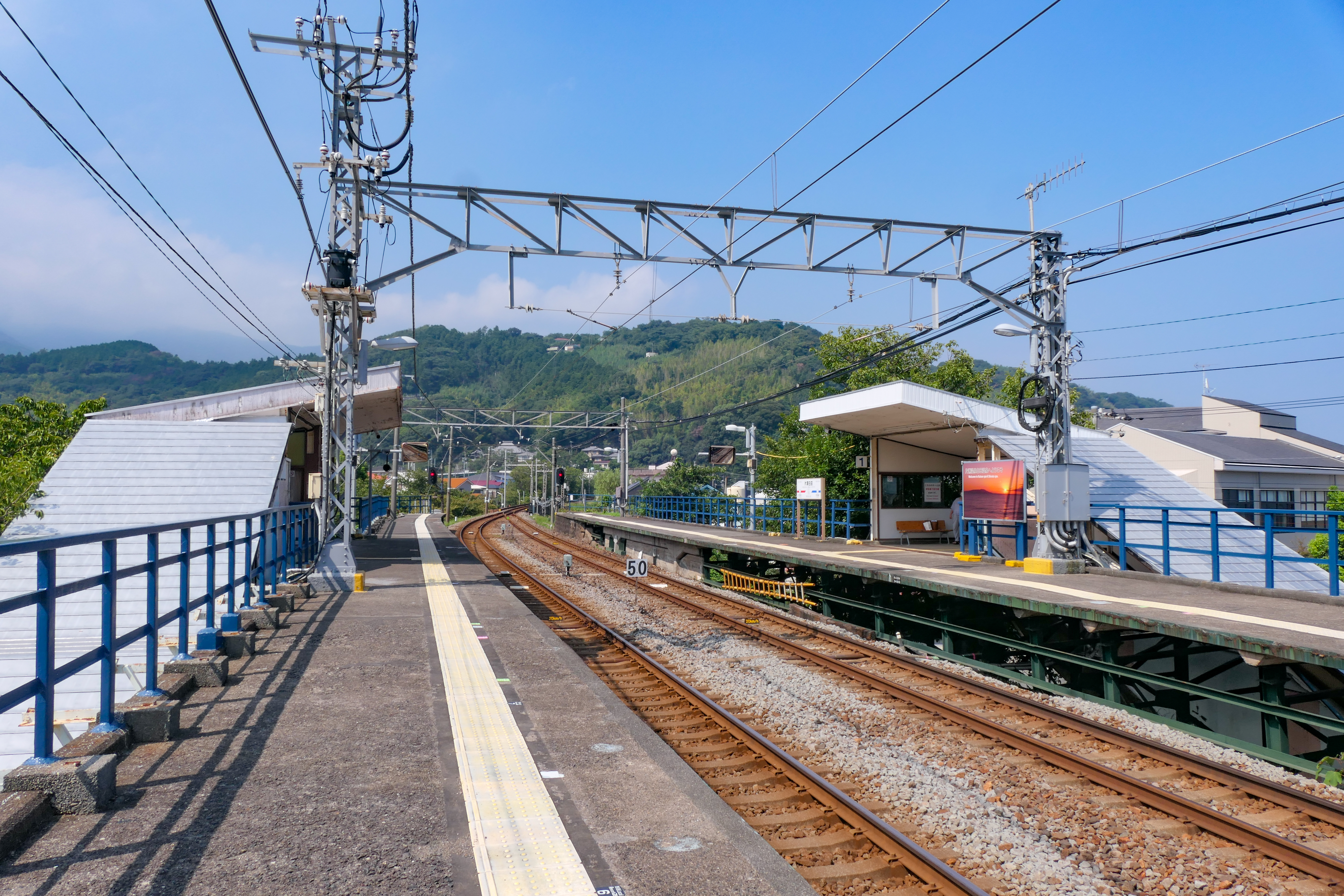
The platforms of Katase-Shirata Station, August 2021

== Adjacent stations ==
«	Service	»
Izu Kyūkō Line
Izu-Atagawa	Local	Izu-Inatori

== History ==
Katase-Shirata Station was opened on December 10, 1961.

== Passenger statistics ==
In fiscal 2017, the station was used by an average of 198 passengers daily (boarding passengers only).

== Surrounding area ==
- Katase Onsen
- Shirata Onsen
- Atagawa Onsen Hospital

== See also ==
- List of railway stations in Japan
