= Kitagata-Makuwa Station =

Railway station in Motosu, Gifu Prefecture, Japan

Kitagata-Makuwa Station 北方真桑駅
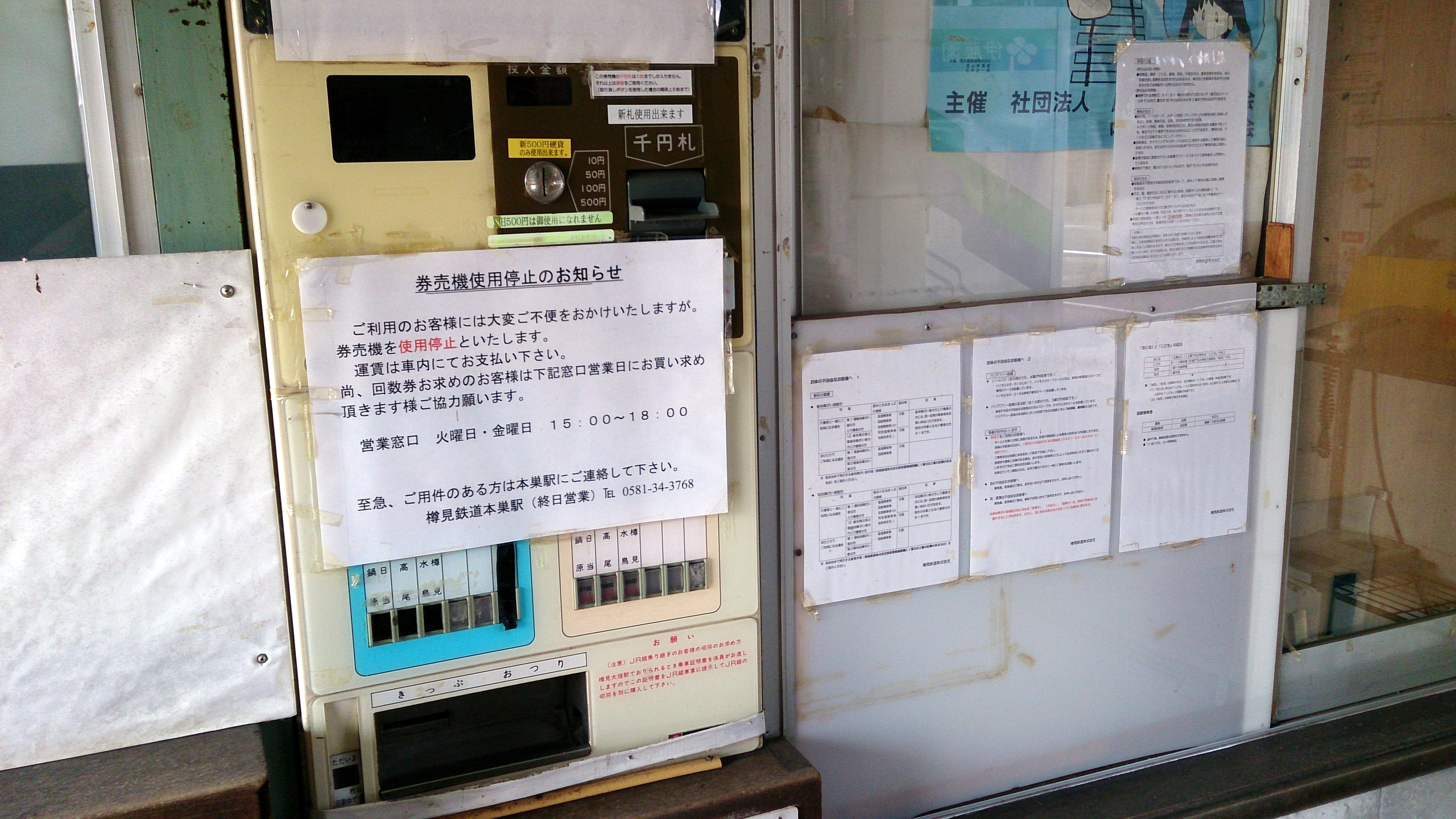
- Kitagata-Makuwa Station in May 2005

General information
- Location: Kamimakuwa, Motosu-shi, Gifu-ken 501-0461; Japan
- Coordinates: 35°26′22.34″N 136°40′27.50″E
- Operator: Tarumi Railway
- Line: ■ Tarumi Line
- Distance: 10.8 km from Ōgaki
- Platforms: 1 island platform
- Tracks: 2

Other information
- Status: Staffed
- Website: Official website (in Japanese)

History
- Opened: March 20, 1956
Location
- Location within Gifu Prefecture Location within Japan

Kitagata-Makuwa Station (北方真桑駅, Kitagata-Makuwa-eki) is a railway station in the city of Motosu, Gifu Prefecture, Japan, operated by the private railway operator Tarumi Railway.

== Lines ==
Kitagata-Makuwa Station is a station on the Tarumi Line, and is located 10.8 rail kilometers from the terminus of the line at Ōgaki.

== Station layout ==
Kitagata-Makuwa Station has one ground-level island platform connected to the station building by a level crossing. The station is attended.

== Adjacent stations ==
«	Service	»
Tarumi Railway
Tarumi Line
Mieji	-	Morera-Gifu

== History ==
Kitagata-Makuwa Station opened on March 20, 1956 as Motosu-Kitakata Station (本巣北方駅). It was renamed to its present name on October 6, 1984.

== Surrounding area ==
- National Route 157
- National Route 303
- Gifu Industrial High School
- Motosu High School

== See also ==
- List of railway stations in Japan
