= Kita-Okazaki Station =

Railway station in Okazaki, Aichi Prefecture, Japan

Kita-Okazaki Station 北岡崎駅
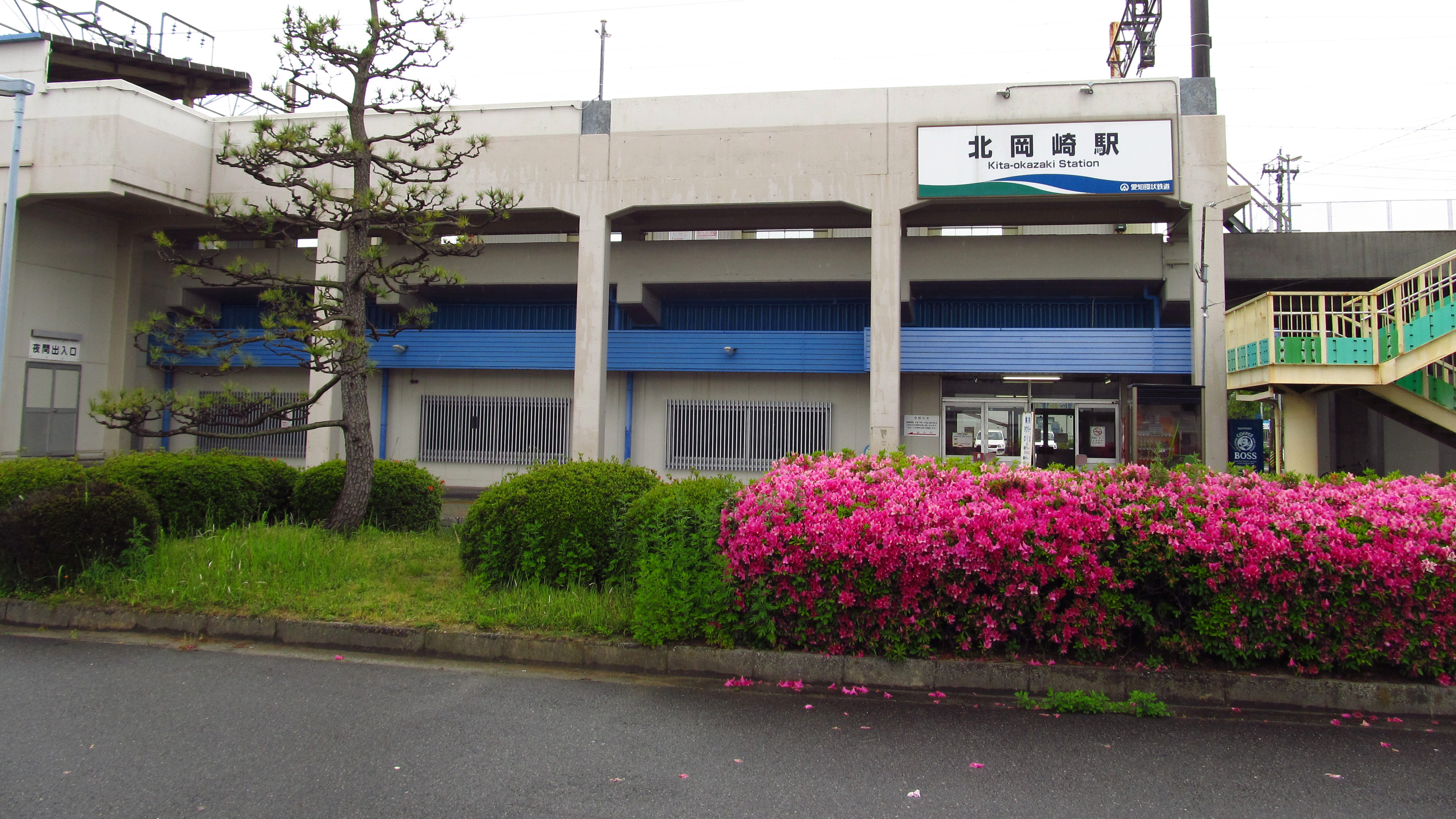
- Kita-Okazaki Station in May 2015

General information
- Location: 19-1 Aoichō, Okazaki-shi, Aichi-ken 444-0913; Japan
- Coordinates: 34.9723°N 137.1580°E
- Operator: Aichi Loop Railway
- Line: ■ Aichi Loop Line
- Distance: 5.3 kilometers from Okazaki
- Platforms: 2 side platforms

Other information
- Status: Staffed
- Station code: 04
- Website: Official website

History
- Opened: October 1, 1970

Passengers
- FY2017: 1795 daily
Location
- Location within Aichi Prefecture Location within Japan

Kita-Okazaki Station (北岡崎駅, Kita-Okazaki-eki) is a railway station in the city of Okazaki, Aichi Prefecture, Japan, operated by the third sector Aichi Loop Railway Company.

== Lines ==
Kita-Okazaki Station is served by the Aichi Loop Line, and is located 5.3 kilometers from the starting point of the line at Okazaki.

== Station layout ==
The station has a single elevated island platform serving two tracks, with the station building located underneath. The station building has automated ticket machines, TOICA automated turnstiles and is staffed.

=== Platforms ===
1	■ Aichi Loop Line	for Mikawa-Toyota and Okazaki
2	■ Aichi Loop Line	for Kōzōji

== Adjacent stations ==
«	Service	»
Aichi Loop Line
Naka-Okazaki	-	Daimon

== Station history ==
Kita-Okazaki Station was opened on October 1, 1970, as a freight station on the Japan National Railways (JNR), primary to support the operations of nearby factories of Toyota Motors and its affiliated companies. Scheduled passenger operations began from April 26, 1976. With the privatization of the JNR on April 1, 1987, the station came under control of JR Central. The station was transferred to the third sector Aichi Loop Railway Company on January 31, 1988. Freight operations were discontinued from 2010.

== Passenger statistics ==
In fiscal 2017, the station was used by an average of 1795 passengers daily.

== Surrounding area ==
- Okazaki City Nursing College
- Okazaki Nishi High School

== See also ==
- List of railway stations in Japan
