= Pref. Art Museum Station =

Railway station in Shizuoka, Japan

Pref. Art Museum Station 県立美術館前駅
- Pref. Art Museum Station in November 2017

General information
- Location: Nakanogo, Shimizu-ku, Shizuoka-shi, Shizuoka-ken; Japan
- Coordinates: 34°59′50.69″N 138°26′16.57″E
- Operator: Shizuoka Railway
- Line: ■ Shizuoka–Shimizu Line
- Distance: 5.7 km from Shin-Shizuoka
- Platforms: 2 side platforms

Other information
- Station code: S09

History
- Opened: March 25, 1986

Passengers
- FY2017: 914 (daily)

Services
Preceding station	Shizuoka Railway	Following station
Pref. Sports Park towards Shin-Shizuoka	Shizuoka–Shimizu Line Local	Kusanagi towards Shin-Shimizu
Location
- Location within Shizuoka Prefecture Location within Japan

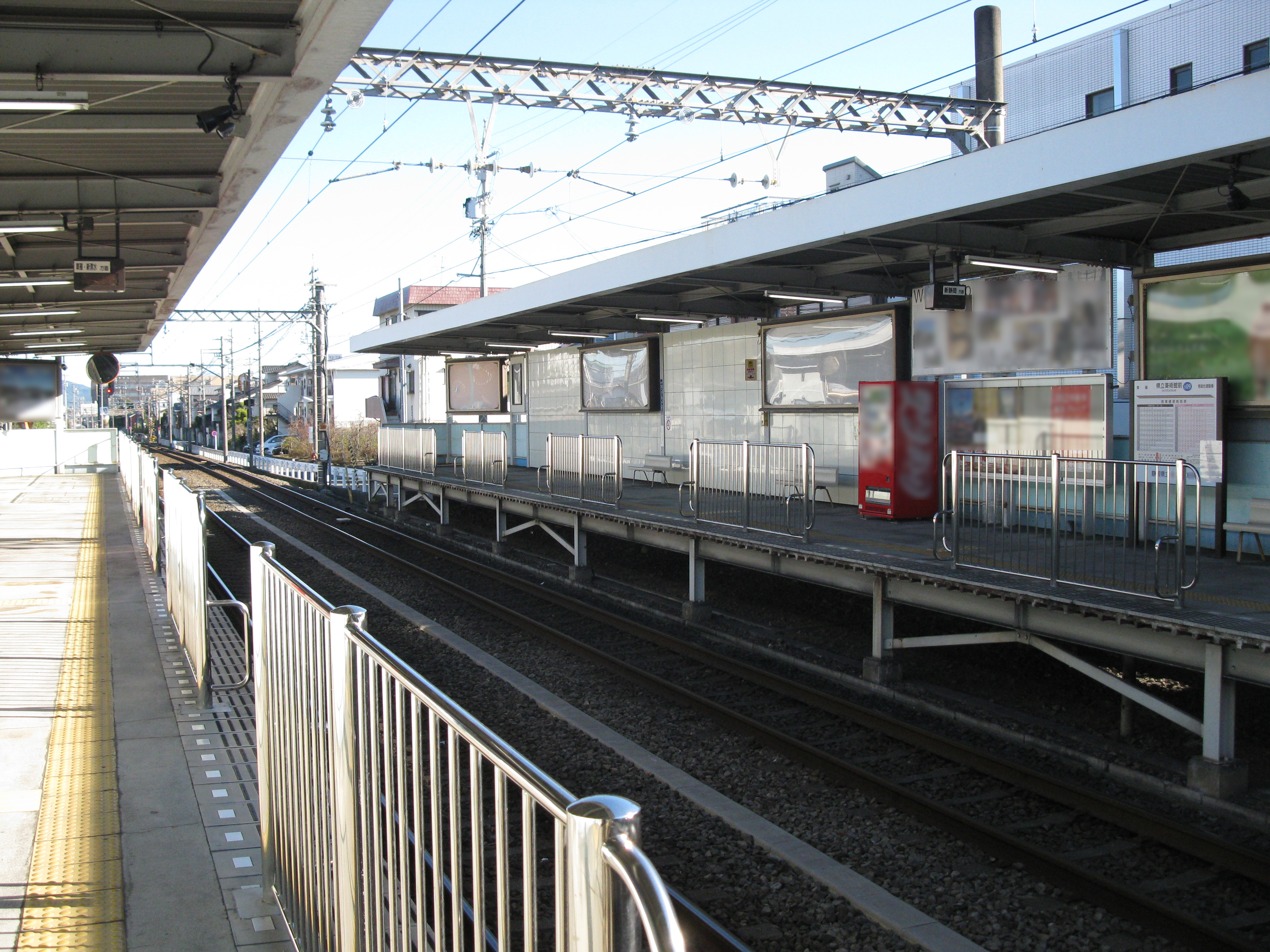
Platforms in 2005

Pref. Art Museum Station (県立美術館前駅, Kenritsu Bijutsukanmae-eki) is a railway station in Suruga-ku, Shizuoka, Shizuoka Prefecture, Japan, operated by the private railway company, Shizuoka Railway (Shizutetsu).

== Lines ==
Pref. Art Museum Station is a station on the Shizuoka–Shimizu Line and is 5.7 kilometers from the starting point of the line at Shin-Shizuoka Station.

== Station layout ==
The station has two side platforms, with a building built above the tracks on the west side of the station. The station entrance is located on the west side of the Shin-Shizuoka direction platform, and has automated ticket machines, and automated turnstiles, which accept the LuLuCa smart card ticketing system as well as the PiTaPa and ICOCA IC cards, as well as a copy of Rodin's The Thinker. The station is wheelchair accessible.

=== Platforms ===
1	■ Shizuoka-Shimizu Line	for Kusanagi and Shin-Shimizu
2	■ Shizuoka–Shimizu Line	for Shin-Shizuoka

== Station history ==
Pref. Art Museum Station was established on March 25, 1986, with the relocation of the Shizuoka Prefectural Art Museum nearby. It is the newest station on the Shizuoka–Shimizu Line.

== Passenger statistics ==
In fiscal 2017, the station was used by an average of 914 passengers daily (boarding passengers only).

== Surrounding area ==
- Shizuoka Prefectural Art Museum
- University of Shizuoka
- Shizuoka Prefectural Central Library

== See also ==
- List of railway stations in Japan
