= JR Kyushubus Company =

Japanese bus company

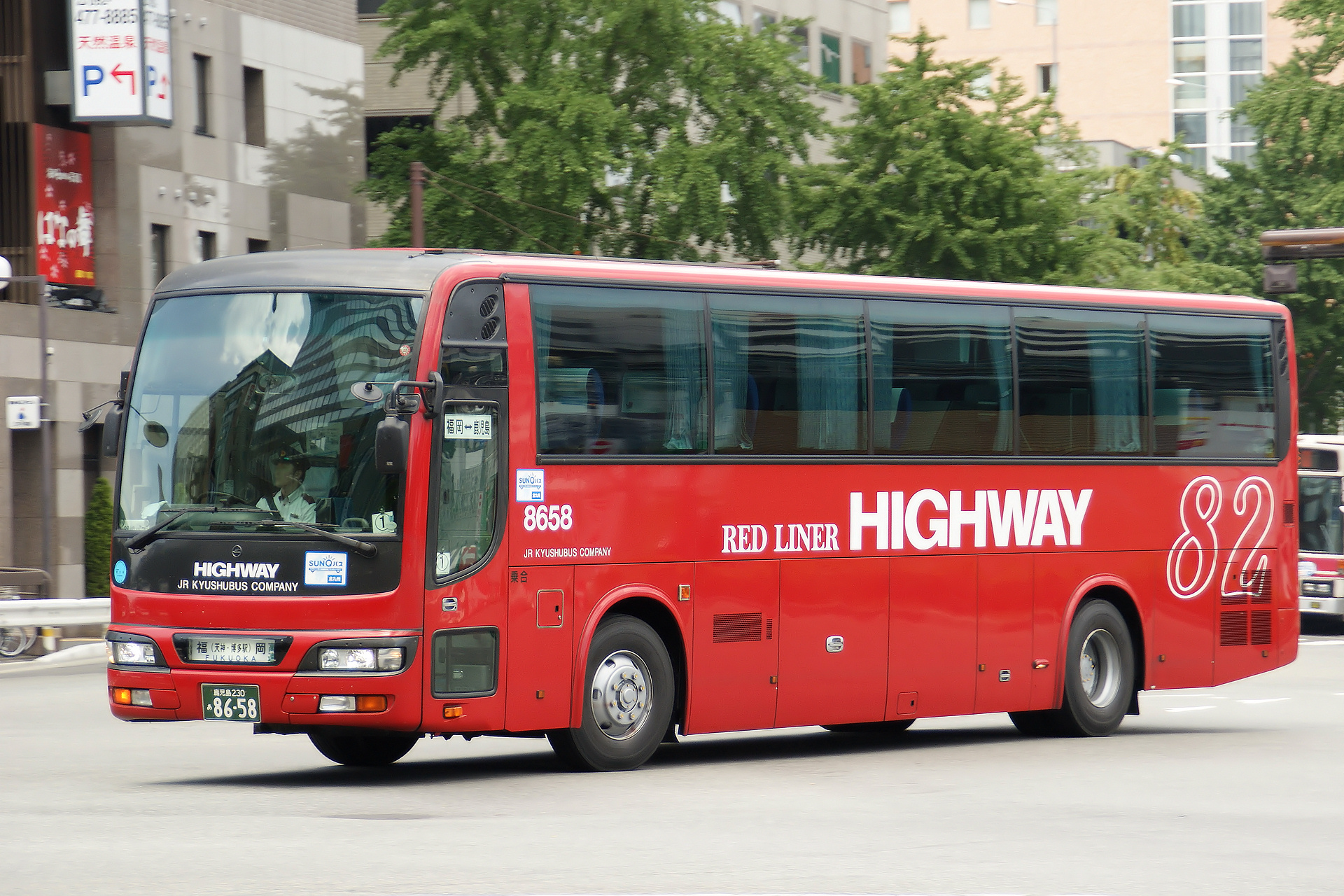
- Express bus (Sakurajima)
- Founded: 5 February 2001; 25 years ago
- Headquarters: 2-22-2 Katakasa, Hakata-ku, Fukuoka City, Fukuoka Prefecture, Japan 812-0043, Japan
- Net income: ▲¥31 million (March 2024)
- Owner: Largest single shareholder: Kyushu Railway Company (100%)
- Number of employees: 184
- Website: https://www.jrkbus.co.jp/

JR Kyushubus Company is one of the bus operators in Kyushu and a wholly owned subsidiary of Kyushu Railway Company (JR Kyushu). Its head office is located at 2-22-2 Katakasa, Hakata-ku, Fukuoka, Fukuoka Prefecture. In addition to express buses and regular route buses, JR Kyushu Bus is one of the JR bus companies that also operates chartered buses and regular sightseeing buses.

== History ==
- April 1, 1987 - Following the privatization of Japanese National Railways, the Kyushu Bus Department of Japanese National Railways was taken over by the Kyushu Railway Company's Bus Division (commonly known as JR Kyushu Bus).
- July 26, 1989 (Heisei 1) - New entry into the "Phoenix" series.
- December 20, 1990 (Heisei 2) - New entry into the "Sakurajima" service.
- February 5, 2001 – JR Kyushu Bus Co., Ltd. (commonly known as JR Kyushu Bus), a bus business subsidiary, is established.
  - July 1 - JR Kyushu transfers its automobile transportation division to JR Kyushu Bus.
  - October 19 - Fukuoka-Yamaguchi Liner begins operation.
- May 31, 2002 – Hirofuku Liner begins operation.
- 2003 (Heisei 15)
  - March 20 - The Fukuoka-Hofu-Shunan Liner begins operation.
  - March 31 - The Sakanoichi Line and Saganoseki Line are completely discontinued (both routes are replaced by Oita Bus (Oita - Saganoseki Line)).
- March 31, 2004 – The Miyabayashi Line was completely abolished (the line was replaced by Miyazaki Kotsu).
- April 2005 - The Kagoshima common IC bus card "Rapica" is introduced within the Kagoshima branch area.
- 2006 (Heisei 18)
  - February 28 : Yamaga Line discontinued. Yamaga Branch closed (route replaced by Kyushu Sanko Bus and Kumamoto Electric Railway).
  - March 31 - The Kurate Line and Uchigaiso Line are completely discontinued (the Kurate Line is replaced by Miyawaka City Bus and Kurate Town Community Bus operated by Techno Kanko Bus, and the Uchigaiso Line is replaced by Nishitetsu Bus Chikuho).
- March 31, 2007 - The Usu-Mitsu Line was completely abolished. The Oita branch was closed (the route was replaced by Usuzu Transportation and Ohno Transportation (now Ohno Takeda Bus), subsidiaries of Oita Bus).
- March 31, 2008 - The Higashi-Fukuma Line, Wakakidai Line, Awashima Line, and part of the Fukuma Line (Tateishi - Yanami - Chikuzen Motogi) were discontinued (all routes were replaced by Fukutsu Minibus, operated by a local taxi company in Fukutsu City).
- June 1, 2010 - Due to the Nogata City Planning Project Susakicho Land Readjustment Project, the Nogata branch office was relocated to the Fukumaru garage site and opened as the "Fukuoka Chubu branch office."
- 2011 (Heisei 23)
  - March 12 - Express bus "B&S Miyazaki" begins operation.
  - April 13 - The express bus "Taiyo-go" begins operation. The "Phoenix-go" is withdrawn.
- April 11, 2012 - The "AEON Mall Fukutsu Circulation" begins operation in Fukutsu City. Regular operation begins on April 21.
  - April 25 - The "Taiyo" service ceases operation, and is integrated into the "Phoenix" service (returning to operation) on the following April 26.
  - July 1 - The company name was changed to JR Kyushu Bus Co., Ltd.
- April 1, 2013 – The Nogata Line introduces the nimoca IC card ticket.
- April 1, 2014 - Following the full opening of the Higashi Kyushu Expressway between Miyazaki and Nobeoka, the express bus "Himuka-go" started operating between Miyazaki City and Nobeoka City in collaboration with Miyazaki Kotsu. This is the first time in 16 years since September 1998 that a bus will connect Miyazaki City and Nobeoka City.
- 2015 (Heisei 27)
  - April 1 - The express bus "Pacific Liner" (Miyazaki, Nobeoka - Oita, Beppu line) begins operation. This is the first time in 38 years that Beppu City and Miyazaki City are connected by direct bus. On the same day, the station bus Fukumaru is discontinued.
  - October 1 - Ibus withdraws from its operation in the Koriyama area of Kagoshima City and is transferred to Iwasaki Bus Network.
- April 1, 2017 – The disability discount system for holders of a physical disability certificate and a rehabilitation certificate, which was applied to the Nogata Line, Ureshino Line, Hokusatsu Line, and regular sightseeing buses, was expanded to holders of a mental health and welfare certificate.
- September 30, 2018 - On this day, the ship withdrew from the Himuka-go.
- 2019 (Reiwa 1)
  - June 2 - Part of the Ureshino Line is extended, and service to Takeo Keirin Stadium and Ureshino Medical Center begins.
  - September 30 - On this day, the bus was withdrawn from the Iizuka Line and Fukuma Line, and transferred to the community buses operated by Miyawaka City (Iizuka Line = Seishin Logistics, Fukuma Line = Chikuho Kanko).
- January 15, 2022 (Reiwa 4) - The Fukuoka Chubu Branch is unmanned, renamed Fukumaru Depot, and incorporated under the management of the Hakata Branch.
- August 28, 2023: With the construction of a section of the Hitahikosan Line as a BRT (BRT Hikoboshi Line), JR Kyushu becomes the operator (management, operation, and management) (the operator is JR Kyushu, with part of the operation entrusted to Hita Bus). Accordingly, the Soeda Branch and the Hita Sales Office of the same branch are opened.

== Boarding Card ==
JR Kyushu's IC card, SUGOCA, has not been introduced on any other lines except for the Hitahikosan Line BRT, which has been conducting a demonstration experiment of on-board fare payment since the line opened.

On the entire Nogata Line, the nimoca card introduced by Nishi-Nippon Railroad (Nishitetsu) and others has been in operation since April 1, 2013, and SUGOCA can also be used as an interoperable card. Kitaca, Suica, Pasmo, TOICA, manaca, ICOCA, PiTaPa, and Hayakaken, which are all national interoperable cards, can also be used.

The Hokusatsu Line has introduced RapiCa, as do the Kagoshima City Tram, Kagoshima City Bus, and Nangoku Kotsu. It is interoperable with the Iwasaki IC cards introduced by Iwasaki Corporation companies such as Kagoshima Kotsu, but it is not a national interoperable card and does not support one-way use.

Nimoca was introduced on the Ureshino Line on September 20, 2022.

== Current route ==
=== Express bus ===
JR Kyushu Bus's highway bus business is based at Hakata Bus Terminal (in front of Hakata Station), and mainly operates routes connecting Fukuoka City with cities within a 300 km radius. In particular, JR Kyushu Bus operates all highway routes from Fukuoka City to Hiroshima Prefecture and Yamaguchi Prefecture, except for the Fukufuku-go (Fukuoka - Shimonoseki, Nishitetsu Expressway Bus, Sanden Kotsu). In recent years, JR Kyushu Bus has also operated intercity routes that are not based in Hakata, such as the "B&S Miyazaki-go" following the full opening of the Kyushu Shinkansen in March 2011, and the "Himuka-go" following the full opening of the Higashi Kyushu Expressway (Nobeoka - Miyazaki section) in 2014.

- Fukuoka - Hiroshima "Guangfu Liner" (operated jointly with Chugoku JR Bus and Guangzhou Tourism)
- Fukuoka/Kitakyushu - Hiroshima "Hiroshima Dream Hakata" (operated jointly with Chugoku JR Bus)

The night service of the "Kwangfu Liner" mentioned above. From October 1, 2023, it will only operate on weekends, holidays, and peak seasons.

- Fukuoka/Kitakyushu - Matsue/Izumo Line "Izumo Dream Hakata" (jointly operated with Chugoku JR Bus)
- Fukuoka - Miyakonojo/Miyazaki "Phoenix" (operated jointly with Nishi - Nippon Railroad, Miyazaki Kotsu, and Kyushu Sanko Bus)
- Fukuoka - Kagoshima "Sakurajima" (jointly operated by Nishi- Nippon Railroad, Nangoku Kotsu, Kagoshima Kotsu, and Kagoshima Kotsu Sightseeing Bus)
- Shin-Yatsushiro Station - Miyakonojo/Miyazaki "B&S Miyazaki" (operated jointly with Sanko Bus and Miyazaki Kotsu)

For details, please refer to the article on the route.

- Nogata Line
  - Person in charge: Hakata Branch
  - Route
    - Main Line (Hakata Bus Terminal - Yamanokami -Fukumaru - Miyata -Nogata)
    - Kamata Danchi Branch Line (Yamanohana - Danchi Entrance - Kamata Danchi)
    - West Japan Cemetery Branch Line (Yama no Kami - West Japan Cemetery (seasonal operation))
    - AEON Mall Fukutsu Circular Line (Fukuma Station Saigo Exit - Shikaku - Suikoukai General Hospital - Kifune - AEON Mall Fukutsu - Fukuma Minami 1-chome - Fukuma Minami 2-chome - Fukuma Minami Elementary *** School West - Fukuma Station Saigo Exit) As the Fukuma Line closed on September 30, 2019, this line is separated from the other Nogata Lines and is like an island.
  - Areas served
    - Fukuoka City, Fukuoka Prefecture
    - Kasuya Town, Kasuya District, Fukuoka Prefecture
    - Hisayama Town, Kasuya District, Fukuoka Prefecture
    - Miyawaka City, Fukuoka Prefecture
    - Nogata City, Fukuoka Prefecture
    - Fukutsu City, Fukuoka Prefecture
- Ureshino Line
  - Contact: Ureshino Branch
  - Route
    - Main Line (Takeo Bicycle Racing Stadium - Yume Town Takeo - Takeo Onsen Station - Ureshino Bus Center - Sonogi Station)
    - Fudosan Line (Ureshino Onsen - Ushi-no-dake)
  - Areas served
    - Takeo City, Saga Prefecture
    - Ureshino City, Saga Prefecture
    - Higashisonogi Town, Higashisonogi District, Nagasaki Prefecture
- Kitasatsuma Line
  - Contact: Kagoshima Branch
  - Areas served
    - Kagoshima City, Kagoshima Prefecture
    - Satsumasendai City, Kagoshima Prefecture
    - Satsuma Town, Satsuma District, Kagoshima Prefecture
- Hitahikosan Line BRT
  - Person in charge: Soeda Branch / Soeda Branch Hita Sales Office
  - Areas served
    - Soeda Town, Tagawa District, Fukuoka Prefecture
    - Toho Village, Asakura County, Fukuoka Prefecture
    - Hita City, Oita Prefecture

=== Bus Station ===
- Miyata Station (becomes a bus stop)
- Fukumaru Station (becomes a bus stop)
- Ureshino Onsen Station
- Satsuma Koriyama Station
