= Mejiron Nimoca =

Contactless smart card system in Oita Prefecture, Japan

Mejiron Nimoca (めじろんnimoca, Mejiron nimoca) was a rechargeable contactless smart card ticketing system for public transport in Oita Prefecture, Japan. Oita Bus, Oita Kōtsū, and Kamenoi Bus introduced the system on December 26, 2010. Like other electronic fare collection systems in Japan, the card uses FeliCa, RFID technology developed by Sony. The design of the card features nimoca's ferret mascot Nimoca-chan alongside Mejiron (めじろん), the mascot character of Oita Prefecture.

Tte card (along with the normal nimoca variant) was initially usable on local bus lines operated by Oita Bus and Oita Kōtsū, with expanded support to more operators beginning March 20, 2011. As Mejiron Nimoca and nimoca had integrated services, SUGOCA, Hayakaken, Suica, and other Japanese IC cards were also usable in the area.

Sales of Mejiron Nimoca cards ended in 2014, with all existing operators transitioning to the standard nimoca design.

== Usable area ==
- Buses
  - Oita Bus: All local bus lines, and some express bus lines
  - Oita Kōtsū: All local bus lines and Airliner airport report bus lines
  - Kamenoi Bus: All local bus lines
- Others (as electronic money):
  - All Lawson stores in Oita Prefecture

== Types of cards ==
- Nimoca: "Anonymous" card without required registration
- Star Nimoca: Named card with the ability to be reissued if lost; also supports commuter passes
- Credit Nimoca: Same as the above with additional credit card functionality
