= EX-IC =

Japanese smart card system

EX-IC (Express IC) is a contactless smart card system that enables ticketless travel on the Tōkaidō Shinkansen and Sanyō Shinkansen lines in Japan. The system was introduced by JR Central in March 2008 for use on the Tōkaidō Shinkansen, and it was expanded to the Sanyō Shinkansen in August 2009.

Usage of the EX-IC system requires a seat reservation for either of the aforementioned Shinkansen lines to be purchased in advance; this may be done with a mobile phone or a computer that has an Internet connection. For Shinkansen passengers who intend to transfer to/from a conventional rail line, it is possible to stack the EX-IC card and another contactless card (such as Suica, PASMO, TOICA, or ICOCA) together and have them processed simultaneously by the card readers at the Shinkansen ticket gates.
