= RapiCa =

Contactless smart card system in Kagoshima, Japan

RapiCa, featuring a design sold by Nangoku Kōtsū

RapiCa (ラピカ, Rapika) is a rechargeable contactless smart card ticketing system for public transport in Kagoshima, Japan, introduced by Kagoshima City Transportation Bureau, Nangoku Kōtsū, and JR Kyūshū Bus on April 1, 2005. The name is the acronym of Rapid and Pay Intelligent Card. Just like JR East's Suica, JR West's ICOCA, and JR Kyūshū's SUGOCA, the card uses RFID technology called FeliCa, developed by Sony.

The card is usable in all the tramway lines of Kagoshima City Transportation Bureau as well as most bus lines of the three operators. The card is not usable outside the prefecture or on JR Kyushu train lines.

Another bus operator in Kagoshima, Iwasaki Corporation, issues another card known as Iwasaki IC Card which provide integrated and interoperable services.
