= FeliCa =

Contactless RFID smart card system

FeliCa is a contactless RFID smart card system from Sony in Japan, primarily used in electronic money cards. The name stands for Felicity Card. First utilized in the Octopus card system in Hong Kong, the technology is used in a variety of cards also in countries such as Japan, Indonesia, Macau, the Philippines and the United States.

== Technology ==
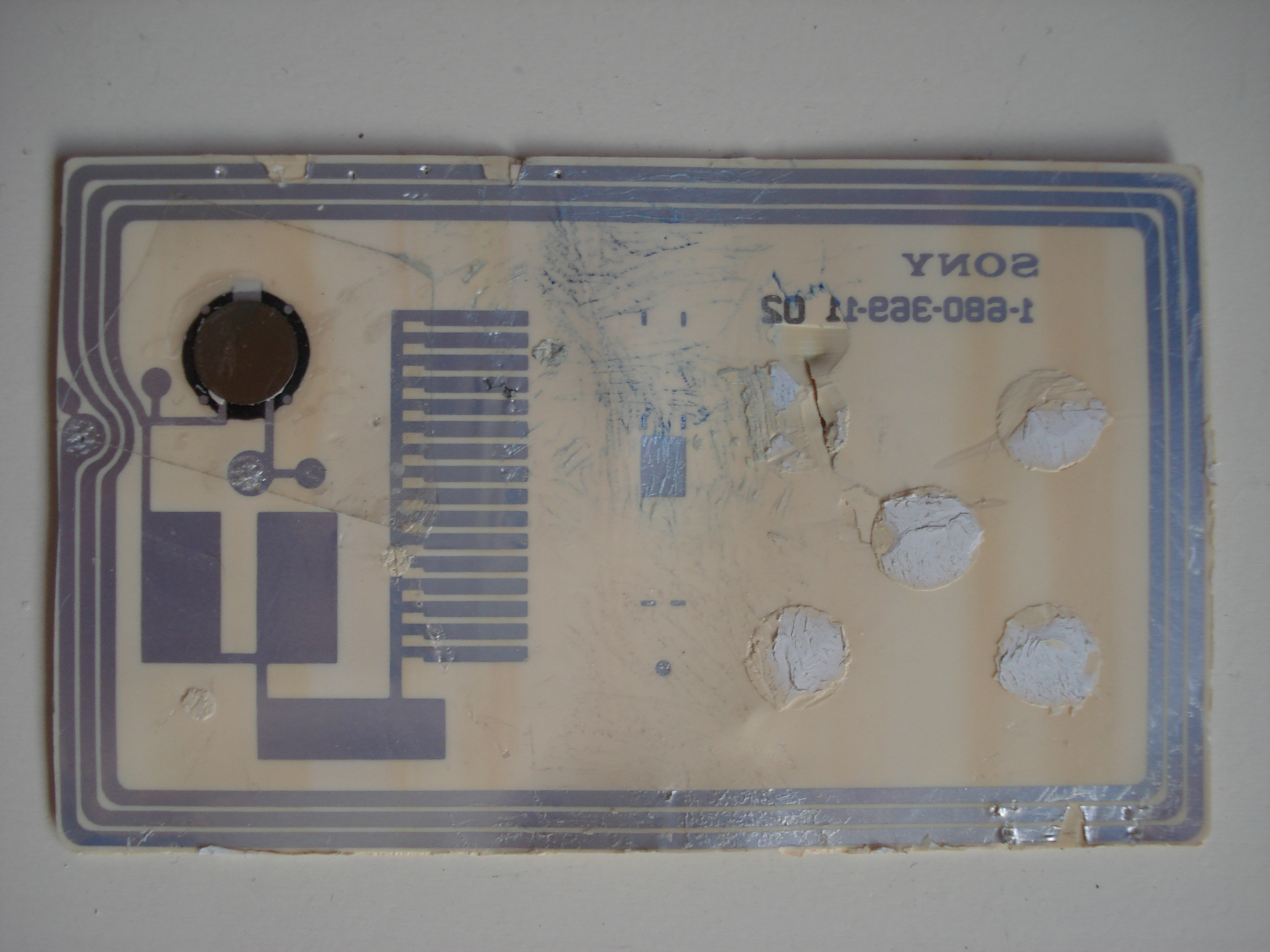
A defaced FeliCa (EZ-Link) card, revealing its internal circuitry

FeliCa's encryption key is dynamically generated each time mutual authentication is performed, preventing fraud such as impersonation.

FeliCa is externally powered, i.e. it does not need a battery to operate. The card uses power supplied from the special FeliCa card reader when the card comes in range. When the data transfer is complete, the reader will stop the supply of power.

FeliCa was proposed for ISO/IEC 14443 Type C but was rejected. However, ISO/IEC 18092 (Near Field Communication) uses some similar modulation methods. It uses Manchester coding at 212 kbit/s in the 13.56 MHz range. A proximity of 10 centimeters or less is required for communication.

FeliCa complies with JIS: X6319-4: Specification of implementation for integrated circuit(s) cards - Part 4: High speed proximity cards. The standard is regulated by JICSAP (Japan IC Card System Application Council).

The UK IT security evaluation and certification scheme provides more detail as to the internal architecture of the FeliCa card (RC-S860). FeliCa IC card (hardware) and its operating system has obtained ISO15408 Evaluation Assurance Level 4 (EAL4), a standard which indicates the security level of information technology and consumer products.

FeliCa is also included as a condition of the NFC Forum Specification Compliance.

A new version of FeliCa IC chip was announced in June 2011 and had enhanced security adopting the Advanced Encryption Standard (AES) encryption. Sony claimed the next generation chip would have a higher performance, reliability and lower power consumption. The newest generation of the technology was announced by Sony in 2020, which received the EAL6+ certification, in accordance with ISO/IEC 15408 Common Criteria.

== Reliability ==
FeliCa supports simultaneous access of up to 8 blocks (1 block is 16 octets). If an IC card is moved outside of the power-supplied area during the session, the FeliCa card automatically discards incomplete data to restore the previous state.

== Mobile FeliCa ==
Mobile FeliCa is a modification of FeliCa for use in mobile phones by FeliCa Networks, a subsidiary company of both NTT DoCoMo and Sony. DoCoMo has developed a wallet phone concept based on Mobile FeliCa and has developed a wide network of partnerships and business models. au and SoftBank (former Vodafone Japan) have also licensed mobile FeliCa from FeliCa Networks.

The Osaifu-Keitai (おサイフケータイ) system (literal translation: "wallet-phone") was developed by NTT DoCoMo, and introduced in July 2004 and later licensed to Vodafone and au, which introduced the product in their own mobile phone ranges under the same name. Using Osaifu-Keitai, multiple FeliCa systems (such as Suica and Edy) can be accessed from a single mobile phone. On January 28, 2006, au introduced Mobile Suica which is used primarily on the railway networks owned by JR East.

On September 7, 2016, Apple announced Apple Pay now features FeliCa technology. Users who purchased iPhone 7 or Apple Watch Series 2 in Japan can now add Suica cards into their Apple Pay wallets and tap their devices just like regular Suica cards. Users can either transfer the balance from a physical Suica card to the Apple Pay wallet, or create a virtual Suica card in the wallet from the JR East application. On September 12, 2017, Apple announced new iPhone 8, iPhone X, and Apple Watch Series 3 models featuring "Global FeliCa", i.e. NFC-F and licensed FeliCa middleware incorporated in all devices sold worldwide, not just ones sold in Japan.

On October 9, 2018, Google announced that its latest Pixel device, the Pixel 3, would support FeliCa in models purchased in Japan. This feature enables support for WAON, Suica, and various other FeliCa-based services through Google Pay and the Osaifu-Keitai system. Successor models including the 3a and 4 have the same support of Mobile Felica in Japan-sold models.

On May 21, 2020, Garmin announced that its new Garmin wearable devices are now compatible with Mobile FeliCa specifications and users can now use Suica with Garmin. Initial compatible devices included the Approach S62, fēnix 6, Legacy, Venu, vívoactive 4/4S, and vívomove series. The feature was expanded to subsequent hardware generations—including the Instinct, fēnix 8, and Venu 4 lines—and remains exclusive to Garmin hardware variations officially released in the Japanese market.

On March 4, 2021, Fitbit introduced Mobile FeliCa compatibility to its product line by enabling Suica transit card functionality on a specific variant of the Fitbit Charge 4 released in Japan. Fitbit and Google subsequently expanded Suica compatibility to include the Charge 5, Charge 6, Sense, Sense 2, Versa 3, and Versa 4 models. This feature remains restricted to Fitbit hardware versions officially distributed within the Japanese market.

== Consumer reader/writer devices ==
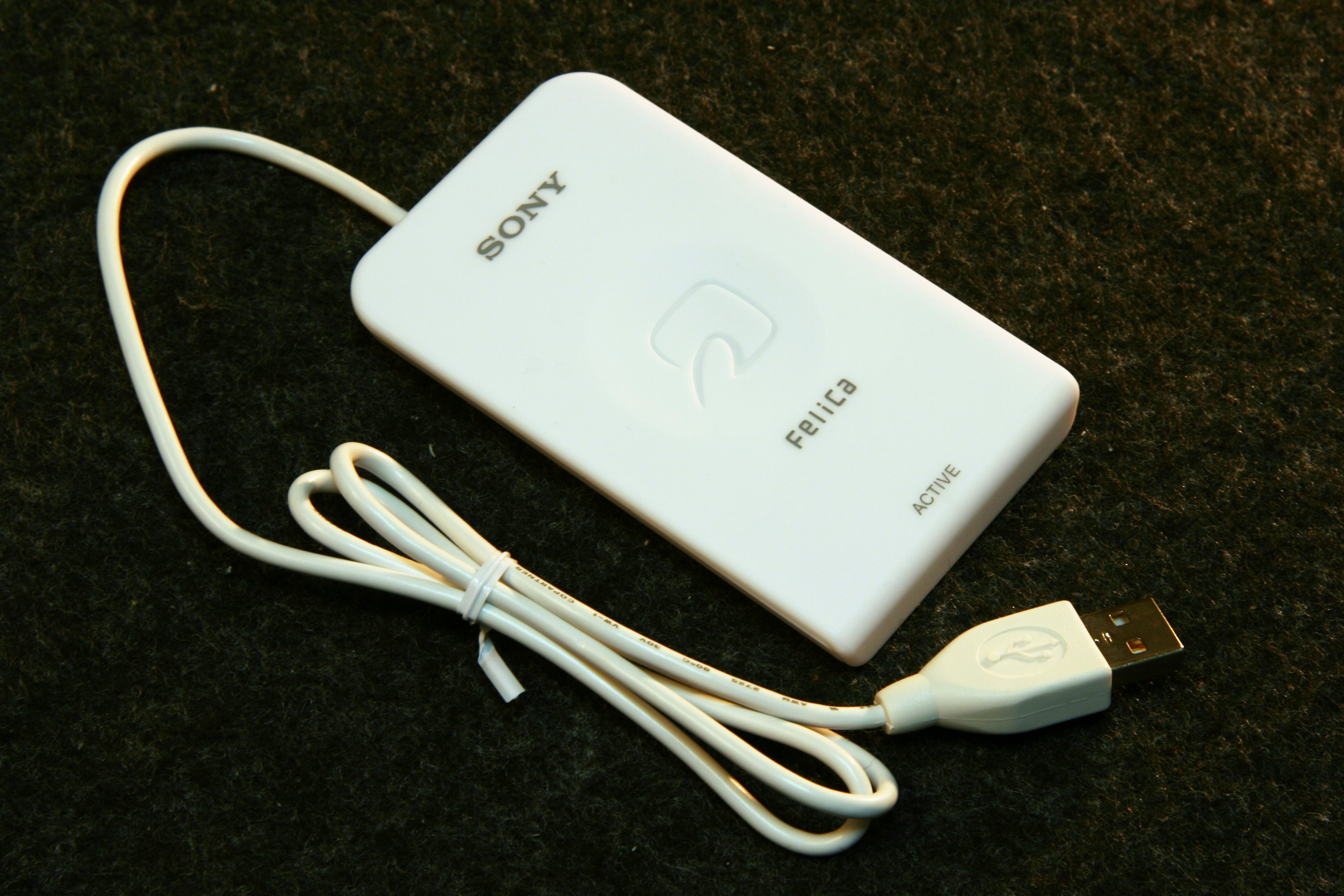
Sony "PaSoRi" RC-S320 Contactless IC Card Reader/Writer

Sony has built a FeliCa reader/writer known as "FeliCa Port" into their VAIO PC line. Using the device, FeliCa cards can be used over the Internet for shopping and charging FeliCa cards.

An external USB FeliCa PC reader/writer has been released as well, called PaSoRi. It is USB-powered and allows one to perform online transactions and top up EZ-link cards in Singapore with credit cards or debit cards anywhere, as long as there is direct access to the Internet.

The Sony PaSoRi Reader is not compatible with the new EZ-link cards.

== Card usage ==
- United States University Campuses (in collaboration with Blackboard Inc.)
- Octopus cards, Hong Kong
- Shenzhen TransCard, Shenzhen, China (defunct; however, Hu Tong Xing uses FeliCa)
- Unified Automatic Fare Collection Scheme completed by Q4 2009, Dubai, United Arab Emirates
- EZ-link, Singapore (until 2009)
- Airport Rail Link (Bangkok), Bangkok, Thailand
- Bangladesh:
  - Rapid Pass, a multipurpose payment card for public transport.
  - SPASS card, Bangladesh Road Transport Corporation, Dhaka, Bangladesh.
- Indonesia:
  - Multi-Trip Card (KMT), KRL Commuterline Greater Jakarta and Surakarta-Yogyakarta
  - Dompetku D-Tap, Indosat Ooredoo
  - Jelajah (e-Ticket), Jakarta MRT
  - Jak Lingko, integrated card for Transjakarta, Jakarta MRT, KRL Commuterline Jakarta, Jakarta LRT, and Soekarno–Hatta Airport Rail Link
- Japan: The system is de facto standard in Japan.
  - Electronic money or mobile payment:
    - Edy, Rakuten Edy
    - iD, NTT Docomo (also deployed to a limited degree in Guam and China)
    - nanaco, Seven & I Holdings Co.
    - Osaifu Keitai
    - QUICPay, Japan Credit Bureau
    - WAON, AEON Group
  - Public transportation payment: (Some can be used as electronic money as well.)
    - Major cards:
      - Hayakaken, Fukuoka City Subway
      - ICOCA, JR West
      - Kitaca, JR Hokkaidō
      - Manaca, Meitetsu, public transportation in Tōkai region (includes Nagoya)
      - nimoca, railways and buses in Kyushu
      - PASMO, railways and buses in Kantō region (includes Tokyo)
      - PiTaPa, railways and buses in Kansai region
      - SUGOCA, JR Kyūshū
      - Suica, JR East
      - TOICA, JR Central
    - See the table below for other cards.

== Integrated services in Japan ==
As FeliCa is the de facto smart card ticketing system standard in Japan, many of these cards have integrated services. A particular region/operator may accept multiple cards.

The table below shows the integrated services FeliCa cards have for each Japanese region.

A: The area accepts all functions of the card, including electronic money function. (There may be subtle differences between each area.)
B: The area accepts basic functions of the card, but not some functions such as electronic money or auto recharging.
A: The area will introduce the new card in the future.
F: The area will accept the card in future.

Area	Operator ^{1}	Suica	PASMO	ICOCA	PiTaPa	TOICA	SUGOCA	Others	
Kitami	Hokkaidō Kitami Bus							A (Bus Card)	
Sapporo	JR Hokkaidō	B						A (Kitaca)	
Sapporo	Sapporo CTB							A (SAPICA)	
Sendai	JR East	A	A	B	F	B	A	A (Kitaca)	
Niigata	JR East	A	A	B	F	B	A	A (Kitaca)	
Niigata	Niigata Kotsu							A (RYUTO)	
Toyama	Toyama Light Rail							A (passca)	
Ishikawa	Hokuriku Railroad							A (ICa)	
Greater Tokyo Area	JR East	A	A	B	F	B	A	A (Kitaca)	
Greater Tokyo Area	Private operators	A	A						
Greater Tokyo Area	Tōkyū Setagaya Line	B	B					A (Setamaru)	
Yamanashi	Yamanashi Kōtsū	B	B					A (Bus IC Card)	
Shizuoka	Shizutetsu Group			B	A			A (LuLuCa)	
Shizuoka	Entetsu Group							A (NicePass)	
Shizuoka	JR Central	B		B		A	B		
Greater Nagoya	JR Central	B		B		A	B		
Greater Nagoya	Meitetsu, TBC Nagoya, Toyotetsu	F				F		A (Manaca)	
Greater Nagoya	Kintetsu	F		B	A				
Area	Operator ^{1}	Suica	PASMO	ICOCA	PiTaPa	TOICA	SUGOCA	Others	
Osaka-Kobe-Kyoto	JR West	B		A	B	B	B		
Osaka-Kobe-Kyoto	Private operators	F		B	A				
Osaka-Kobe-Kyoto	Nara Kōtsū	F		B	A			A (CI-CA)	
Osaka-Kobe-Kyoto	Itami CTB	F		B	A			A (Itappy)	
Osaka-Kobe-Kyoto	Shinki Bus	F		B	A			A (NicoPa)	
Okayama	Shinki Bus	F		B	A			A (NicoPa)	
Okayama	Private operators	F		B	A			A (Hareca)	
Okayama	JR West	B		A	B	B	B		
Hiroshima	JR West	B		A	B	B	B		
Hiroshima	Private operators			B				A (PASPY)	
Kagawa	Kotoden Group							A (IruCa)	
Ehime	Iyo Railway							A (IC e-card)	
Fukuoka	Nishitetsu	A					A	A (nimoca)	A (Hayakaken)
Fukuoka	JR Kyūshū	A		B		B	A	B (nimoca)	A (Hayakaken)
Fukuoka	Fukuoka CTB	A					A	B (nimoca)	A (Hayakaken)
Fukuoka	Kitakyūshū CTB							A (Himawari Bus Card)	
Nagasaki	Private operators							A (Nagasaki Smart Card)	
Oita	Oita Bus, Oita Kōtsū, Kamenoi Bus	A					A	A (Mejiron nimoca)	
Miyazaki	Miyazaki Kōtsū							A (Miyakō Busca)	
Kagoshima	Kagoshima CTB							A (RapiCa)	A (Iwasaki IC Card)
Kagoshima	Iwasaki Group							A (RapiCa)	A (Iwasaki IC Card)
Area	Operator	Suica	PASMO	ICOCA	PiTaPa	TOICA	SUGOCA	Others	

A few cards can be used as electronic money in some unmarked areas.
^{1}: In many cases, there are multiple operators accepting the same card in the same area. See each card article for the full listing.
