= IruCa =

Contactless smart card system in Takamatsu, Japan

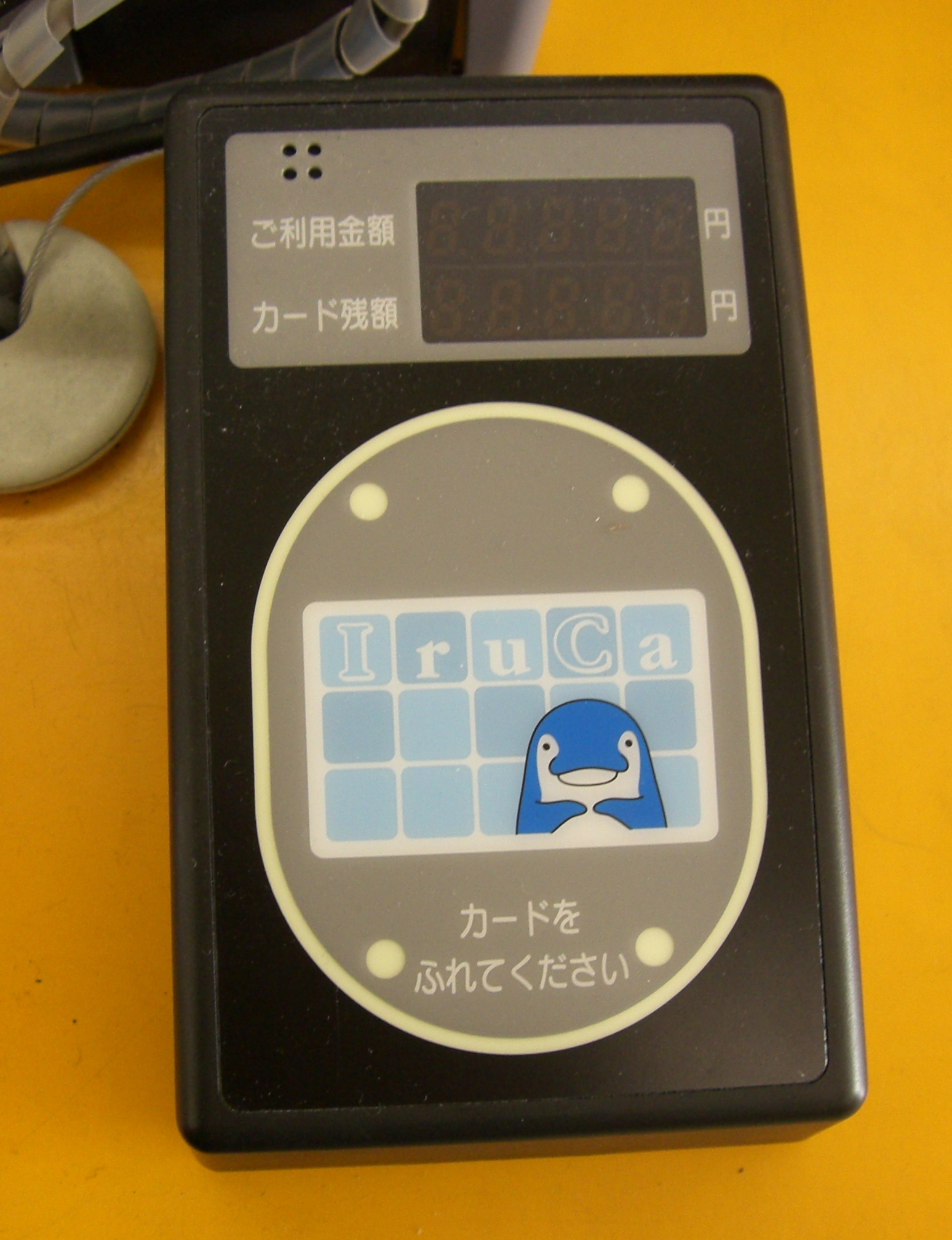
A card reader at a convenience store

IruCa (イルカ, Iruka) is a rechargeable contactless smart card ticketing system for public transport introduced by Takamatsu-Kotohira Electric Railroad (Kotoden) in Takamatsu, Japan from February 2, 2005. The name comes from IC and iruka (dolphin or need), the latter being the mascot character of the company. The Dolphin character made 2002 and to cautionary lesson to employees used to be disliked by the locals by bad behavior of them at that time. "Iruka" was from someone said "Kotoden wa iruka, iranai ka?" or "Is the people need us, or not?", an employee meeting when soon after fail the company. Just like JR East's Suica or JR West's ICOCA, the card uses RFID technology developed by Sony corporation known as FeliCa. As of July 2006, 77,000 cards are issued.

The card is usable in all the Kotoden railway lines, as well as Kotoden bus lines. The function as an electronic money is also experimented in the limited number of stores in Takamatsu, including Tenmaya Department Store.

== Types of cards ==

- IruCa commuter pass: A rechargeable commuter pass.
- IruCa ticket:
  - Free IruCa: Blue. A blank card that doesn't need a registration.
  - School IruCa: Yellow. Students of some selected schools can use this.
  - Senior IruCa: Purple. For 65 years old or above.
  - Kids IruCa: Red. For elementary school students.
  - Green IruCa: Green. For handicapped customers. Fares always become half priced.
