= Passnet =

Magnetic stored-value card system formerly used for public transport in Tokyo

- Location: Tokyo and surrounding Kanto region, Japan
- Launched: 14 October 2000
- Discontinued: 31 January 2018
- Technology: Magnetic stripe card
- Operator: Consortium of railway companies
- Currency: Japanese yen
- Stored-value: Pay as you go
- Retailed: Tokyo Metro stations; Toei Subway stations; Private railway stations

Passnet (Japanese: パスネット, Hepburn: Pasunetto) was a magnetic stored-value card system primarily used for public transportation across 22 private railway and subway lines in the Kanto region of Japan, including Tokyo. Introduced on 14 October 2000, it allowed passengers to seamlessly pay fares by inserting their cards into automatic ticket gates, with the fare automatically deducted upon exit.

Passnet cards could be purchased with a fixed value of 1,000, 3,000 or 5,000 yen. They could not be recharged, but any remaining value could be used to pay for a paper ticket. The cards could also be used to purchase tickets from vending machines. The name "Passnet" was selected through a public contest.

While the Passnet system initially aimed for compatibility with JR East's Suica card, full integration was not achieved. The advent of the non-contact IC card system, PASMO, on 18 March 2007, led to the gradual phasing out of Passnet.

Sales of Passnet cards officially ceased on 10 January 2008. Their use at automatic ticket gates was discontinued on 14 March 2008, though some exceptions allowed continued use until 13 March 2009. Limited functionality, such as purchasing tickets or adjusting fares at machines, remained available until 31 March 2015. All Passnet services, including card refunds, were completely discontinued on 31 January 2018.
