= Nationwide Mutual Usage Service =

System allowing for reciprocal use of public transport cards in Japan

- Service mark
- Region: Japan
- Industry: Public transport Shopping
- Technology: FeliCa (NFC-F)
- Launched: March 23, 2013

IC card interoperability diagram

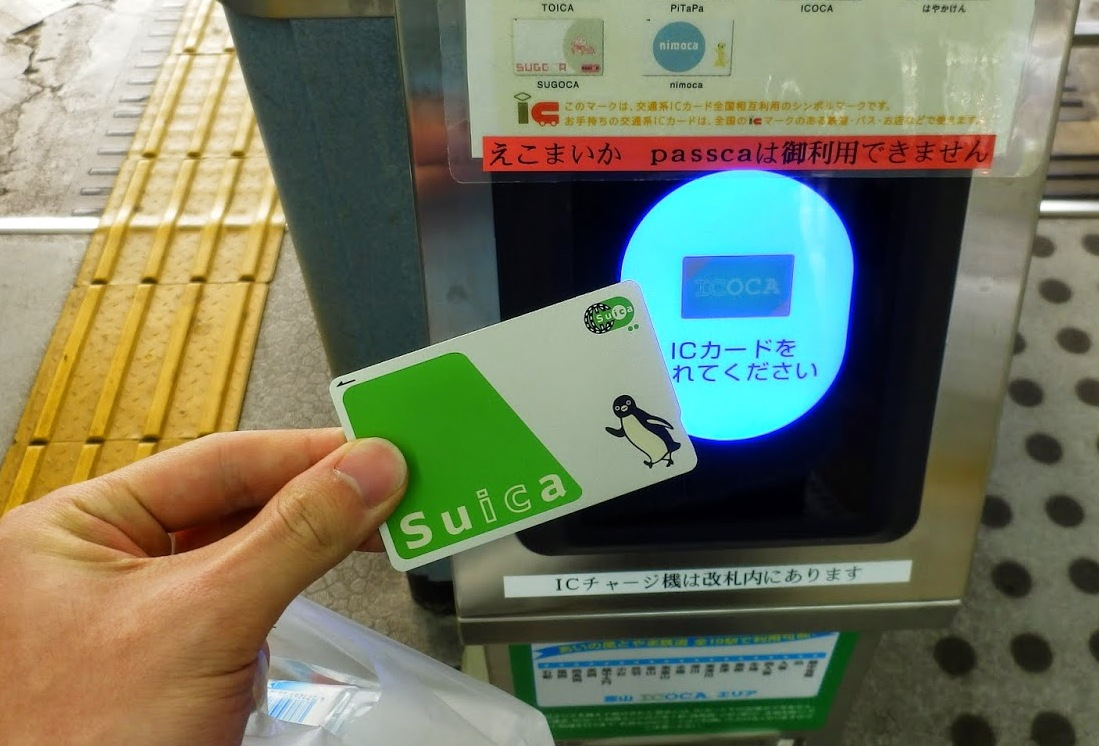
A Suica being tapped on an ICOCA-branded ticket gate in Toyama, demonstrating compatibility between the two systems

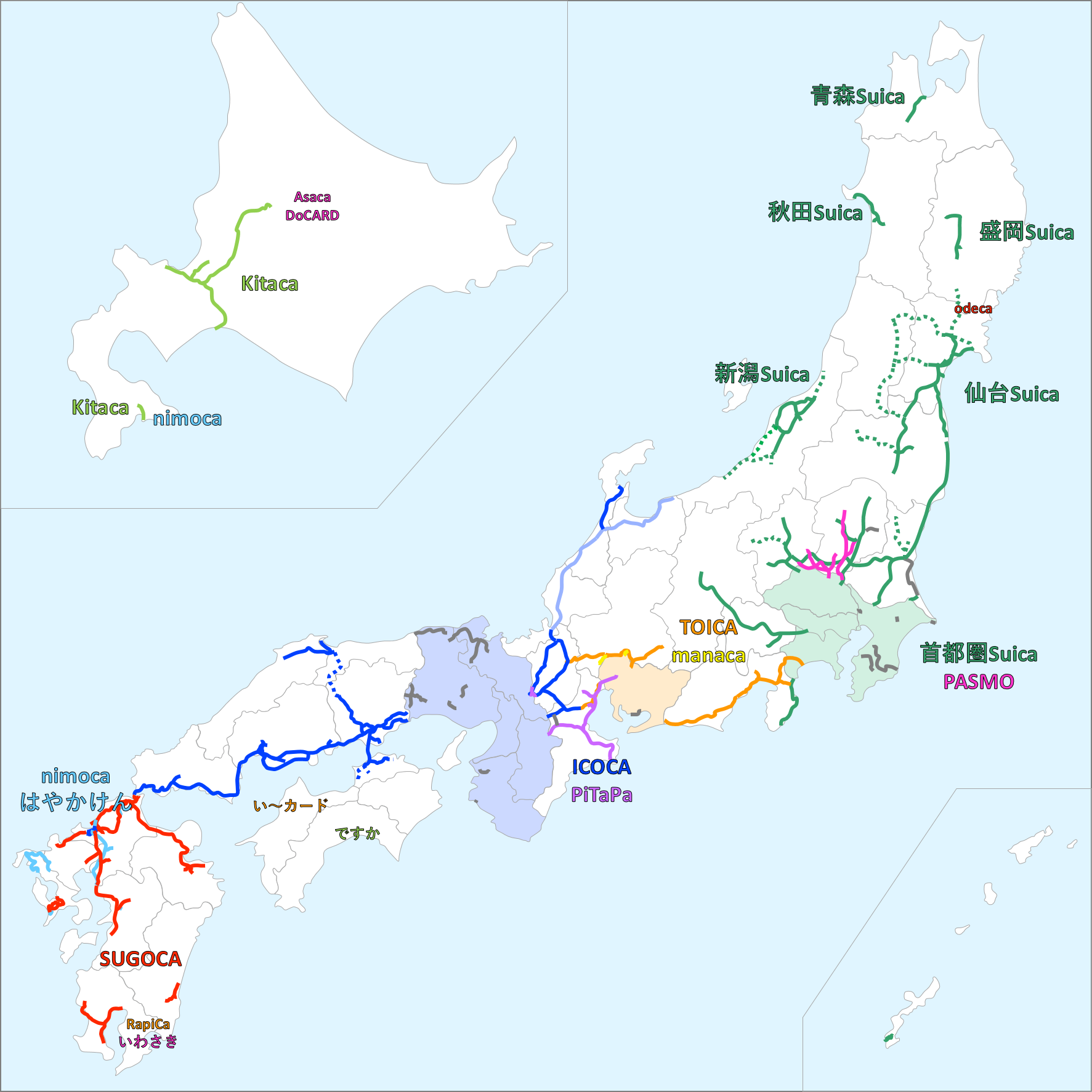
Map of Japan showing major IC card service areas (as of July 2024)

Japan's Nationwide Mutual Usage Service (Note: Japanese: 全国相互利用サービス, Hepburn: Zenkoku Sōgo Riyō Sābisu) is a system that enables reciprocal use of the country's ten major transportation IC cards. Launched on March 23, 2013, it allows passengers to use their card across participating public, private, and third-sector transportation systems throughout Japan. As of May 12, 2025, the service was available on services operated by 348 transit operators.

The ten participating cards are Kitaca (JR Hokkaido), PASMO (Pasmo Co, Ltd.), Suica (JR East), manaca (Nagoya Transportation Development Organization and MIC Co., Ltd.), TOICA (JR Central), PiTaPa (Surutto KANSAI), ICOCA (JR West), Hayakaken (Fukuoka City Transportation Bureau), nimoca (Nishitetsu), and SUGOCA (JR Kyushu).

Holders can generally use any of the ten cards in the service areas of the others, while some regional IC cards outside the system can also be used through separate interoperability agreements. Nine of the ten cards also support reciprocal electronic money use; PiTaPa is the exception. The cards use Sony's FeliCa RFID technology.

Despite the nationwide interoperability, cards generally cannot be used for continuous travel between separate service areas, with some exceptions. (Note: IC cards can be used on certain services connecting different card areas, including services between Suica and PASMO areas in the Greater Tokyo Area and certain direct services between SUGOCA and Hayakaken areas in Kyushu.) A symbol consisting of the letters "IC" combined with a pantograph and wheel motif identifies participating services and is displayed on ticket gates and fare collection equipment.

== History ==
Rollout of IC card systems and interoperability in Japan (as of March 2018)

While previous bilateral and trilateral agreements between companies existed previously, such as the ability for JR West's ICOCA and JR East's Suica to be used interchangeably since August 2004, this was abandoned in favor of a blanket approach targeting all major cards, realized with the launch of the Nationwide Mutual Usage Service. Discussions of such a system had been underway since December 2010, and testing lasted for six months prior to public release. An announcement was released jointly by all eleven issuing companies on December 18, 2012, with plans for the service to begin in March of the following year.

== Implementation ==
Following launch, as of March 31, 2013, Suica – the oldest and most popular of the ten cards – became usable at 4,365 train stations and on approximately 21,000 buses nationwide. As electronic money, Suica became accepted at nearly 210,000 retail locations and at the time was reported to be the payment method of 3.4 million transactions each day. Per estimates provided by the Ministry of Internal Affairs and Communications, over 100 million residents became covered under the new Mutual Usage system.

A golden brown and red service mark, consisting of the letters "IC" with a pantograph replacing the tittle of the "i" and wheels on the "c", is displayed at ticket gates, fare boxes, and point of sale systems (such as in convenience stores or restaurants) where any of the cards are accepted as a form of payment. The service mark was designed by Mai Shibatani.

PiTaPa is excluded from mutual usage agreements when used as digital currency (e-money) due to its implementation as post-pay system tied to a user's bank account rather than a prepaid, rechargeable card.

=== Multi-function Cards for Regional Transit ===
Beginning in 2021, initially targeting Aomori, Akita, northern Iwate, Yamagata, and Gunma Prefectures, JR East introduced chiiki renkei (地域連携; lit. 'regional cooperation') IC cards, 2-in-1 cards which combine the needs of smaller, local transit operators with standard Suica functionality. With limited budget and resources to overhaul historical systems to comply with JR East's standards, these cards allow for regional "affiliate" operators to continue supporting various implementations of commuter passes while also providing riders with the ability to use their cards identically to Suica, i.e. not only on local transit but also in larger cities. As Suica is part of the Nationwide Mutual Usage Service, these cards are also interoperable with the ten major cards and usable across Japan.

Discounted and subsidized fares, such as those for disabled riders, can also be selectively applied in users' home regions while charging standard fares elsewhere.

Multi-function IC cards include nolbé in Gunma, totra in Tochigi, yamako cherica and shoko cherica in Yamagata, Iwate Green Pass in Iwate, HACHICA in Hachinohe, and AOPASS in Aomori, among others. JR East has viewed this ongoing endeavor as an effort to "promote regional revitalization" in the Tōhoku region by allowing for the use of Suica and other transit cards in these areas, thereby attracting potential visitors and positioning the cards as a component of the company's mobility as a service strategy. These cards follow the SD2 FeliCa standard and support reward point programs of both local operators and JR East via FeliCa Pocket. They are alternatively referred to as "Regional Collaboration IC cards."

A revised KURURU IC card launched in Nagano in February 2025, superseding the previous local card of the same name without mutual usage functionality. In April 2026, Alpico Kōtsū adopted the new KURURU card for its buses in Matsumoto.

== Exceptions ==
The ten cards are fully interchangeable (i.e. any system that supports one of the cards will support the other nine) with the exception of Kantō Railway in Ibaraki Prefecture. Kantō Railway's two lines support only PASMO and Suica, and have not yet been upgraded due to low ridership and the high cost of replacing aged equipment.

Prior to March 14, 2026, Chiba Urban Monorail also only supported PASMO and Suica; plans to support the other Mutual Usage cards beginning the following spring were announced in November 2025.

== See also ==
- Transport in Japan
- Rail transport in Japan
- List of public transport smart cards
