= TOICA =

Contactless smart card used in Japan

- Location: Usable nationwide Distributed in the Tōkai region (including the Greater Nagoya Area) and at Tokaido Shinkansen stations
- Launched: July 28, 2006
- Technology: FeliCa
- Manager: JR Central
- Currency: Japanese yen (¥20,000 maximum load)
- Stored-value: Pay as you go
- Credit expiry: None
- Retailed: JR Central stations; Aichi Loop Railway stations
- Website: toica.jr-central.co.jp

TOICA is a rechargeable contactless smart card ticketing system for JR Central railway network which was introduced in the Chūkyō Area (Greater Nagoya) of Japan on November 25, 2006. The name is an abbreviation of "Tōkai IC Card". Like JR East's Suica or JR West's ICOCA, the card uses RFID technology developed by Sony known as FeliCa.

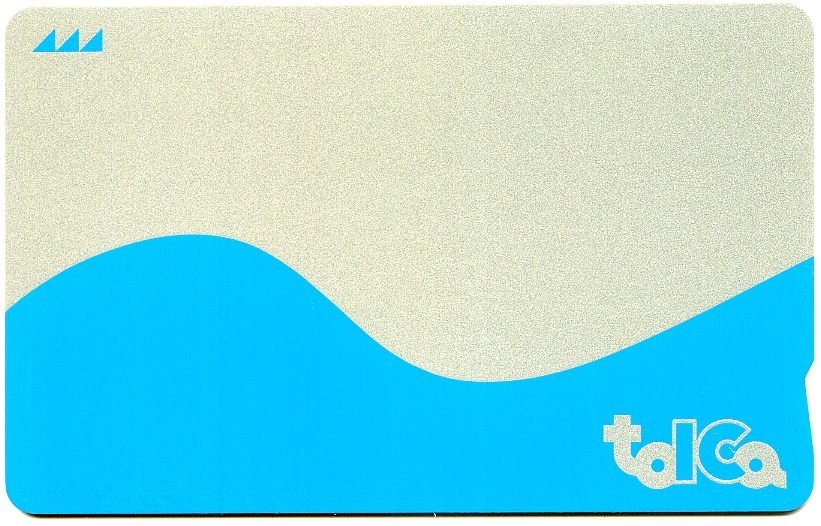
First-generation TOICA card (without chick mascots)

As of December 2007, a year after launch, 350,000 cards had been issued, and 50% of riders (and 70% of commuter pass holders) in the Nagoya area used the card. By Spring 2023, 3.27 million cards had been issued.

Since 2013, it has been part of Japan's Nationwide Mutual Usage Service, allowing it to be used in major cities across the country.

== Usable area ==
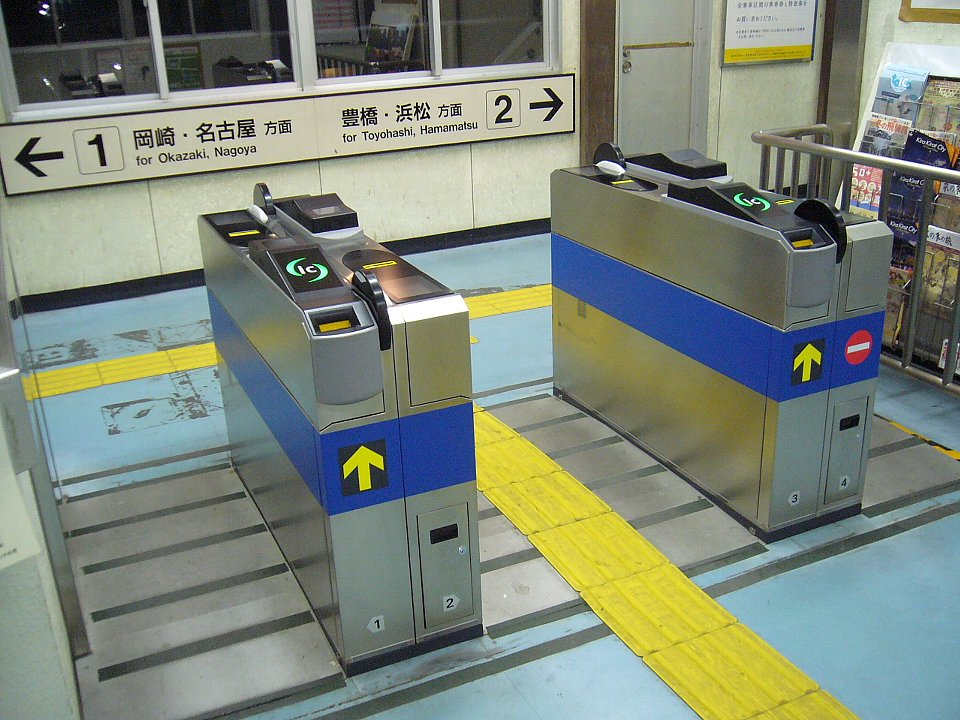
Automatic ticket gate (without blocking plates) at Mikawa-Shiotsu Station

As of October 2026, TOICA is currently accepted on JR Central lines in the following areas:

- Tōkaidō Main Line, between Atami and Maibara (entire JR Central-operated section)
  - Includes branch between Ōgaki and Mino-Akasaka
  - East of Atami and west of Maibara, stations are served by Suica or ICOCA, see below on limitations when using
- Gotemba Line, between Kōzu and Numazu (entire line)
  - East of Kōzu, Suica is accepted (JR East area)
- Minobu Line, between Fuji and Nishi-Fujinomiya, and between Kajikazawaguchi and Kōfu
  - Travel between Nishi-Fujinomiya and Kajikazawaguchi is allowed without alighting midway
  - North of Kōfu, Suica is accepted (JR East area)
- Iida Line, between Toyohashi and Hon-Nagashino
- Taketoyo Line, between Ōbu and Taketoyo (entire line)
- Chūō Main Line, between Nagoya and Nakatsugawa
- Kansai Main Line, between Nagoya and Kameyama (entire JR Central-operated section)
  - West of Kameyama, ICOCA is accepted (entire line)
- Takayama Main Line, between Gifu and Mino-Ōta
  - Travel to Gero, Takayama, and Hida-Furukawa is also supported in some circumstances
    - Travel on local trains is supported between Takayma Main Line stations (Gifu–Mino-Ōta) and one of the three stations, along with between the three stations themselves
    - When traveling from Nagoya, only travel on the limited express Hida is supported
- Taita Line, between Mino-Ōta and Tajimi (entire line)

Since 2018, TOICA has also been supported on the Aichi Loop Line (Aikan) in Eastern Aichi.

== Interoperation ==
IC card interoperation map

As of March 23, 2013, TOICA began interoperability with nine other major IC cards, allowing it to be used country-wide as part of Japan's Nationwide Mutual Usage Service. As such, it may be used interchangeably with manaca, Suica (including Mobile Suica), PASMO, ICOCA, SUGOCA, and other cards.

Prior to the beginning of nationwide interoperability, TOICA became interoperable with Suica and ICOCA in March 2008 and with SUGOCA in March 2011.

Smart card systems in Shizuoka Prefecture, namely LuLuCa (Shizuoka Railway) and NicePass (Enshu Railway), are yet to be integrated.

== Mobile devices ==
A version for mobile phones, built atop JR West's Mobile ICOCA service and using Mobile FeliCa and Osaifu-Keitai functionality, was launched simultaneously for both Android and IOS devices on March 17, 2026. Cards are issued using the Mobile ICOCA mobile app and branded as ICOCA (TOICA model).
