= Nagasaki Smart Card =

Former contactless fare card system in Nagasaki Prefecture, Japan

1st generation Nagasaki Smart Card.

Nagasaki Smart Card (Japanese: 長崎スマートカード) was a regional contactless smart card fare system used on participating bus, tram and railway services in Nagasaki Prefecture, Japan, from 2002 to 2020. It began service on 21 January 2002 as Japan's first shared IC card for multiple bus operators, and was later expanded to a wider group of transport companies in the prefecture.

The card stored fare value and could be used across participating operators' local routes. Over time the system added commuter-pass products and a mobile-phone version, and by 2017 it was used by 10 operators, including Nagasaki Electric Tramway and Matsuura Railway. It was phased out because its equipment had aged and, as a local card, it was not compatible with Japan's nationwide mutually interoperable transport IC card network. Beginning in 2019, operators replaced it with either nagasaki nimoca or N+Tcard, and the last Nagasaki Smart Card services ended in September 2020.

== History ==
The Nagasaki Smart Card was introduced to make bus travel more convenient and to encourage ridership at a time when bus patronage was declining. According to the transport ministry, five mainland Nagasaki operators launched the shared card system in January 2002, with a sixth operator joining in October 2003. The original operating rules described it as a non-contact IC ticket for use on participating operators' routes, excluding most highway buses, sightseeing buses and vehicles without the system logo.

The system grew quickly. A transport ministry case study reported that about 250,000 cards were sold between 2002 and 2005, while annual usage reached about 30 million transactions in fiscal 2005. The same study recorded the later introduction of IC commuter passes and a mobile-phone version of the service. On 20 March 2008, the system was extended to Nagasaki Electric Tramway, broadening it beyond bus operations. By 2017, the card was in use across 10 operators in the prefecture.

== System ==
Nagasaki Smart Card was a stored-fare card sold initially for 3,000 yen. It could be reloaded in 1,000-yen units up to a balance ceiling of 30,000 yen, and the operating rules provided for point service and transfer-discount schemes across participating operators. Later industry summaries described it as a prefecture-wide IC fare card shared by 10 operators, with bonus value added on recharge.

Because the card was a regional system, it could not be used on Japan's national network of mutually interoperable transport IC cards. By the late 2010s this had become a growing disadvantage for both residents and visitors, especially as other cities adopted cards that were accepted nationwide.

== Replacement and withdrawal ==
Transport operators in Nagasaki decided to retire the system after more than 15 years of use. Nagasaki City and Sasebo City documents cited ageing equipment and the card's lack of national interoperability as the main reasons for replacement. A joint announcement in November 2019 said that several operators would adopt nimoca, giving users access to Japan's ten-card mutual-use network and electronic money functions.

The withdrawal took place in stages. An official 2020 notice said that Nagasaki Bus and Saikai Kōtsū had already ended Nagasaki Smart Card service on 27 December 2019; Matsuura Railway ended use on 31 May 2020, and Nagasaki Electric Tramway on 30 June 2020. Other participating operators were scheduled to finish around September 2020, while Nagasaki Bus and Saikai Kōtsū replaced the old card with N+Tcard rather than nimoca. Later notices from operators and local government described 30 September 2020 as the end of use for the remaining issuers. Refund handling remained with the original issuer shown on each card.
