= Garmin Instinct =

Line of GPS watches produced by Garmin

Instinct
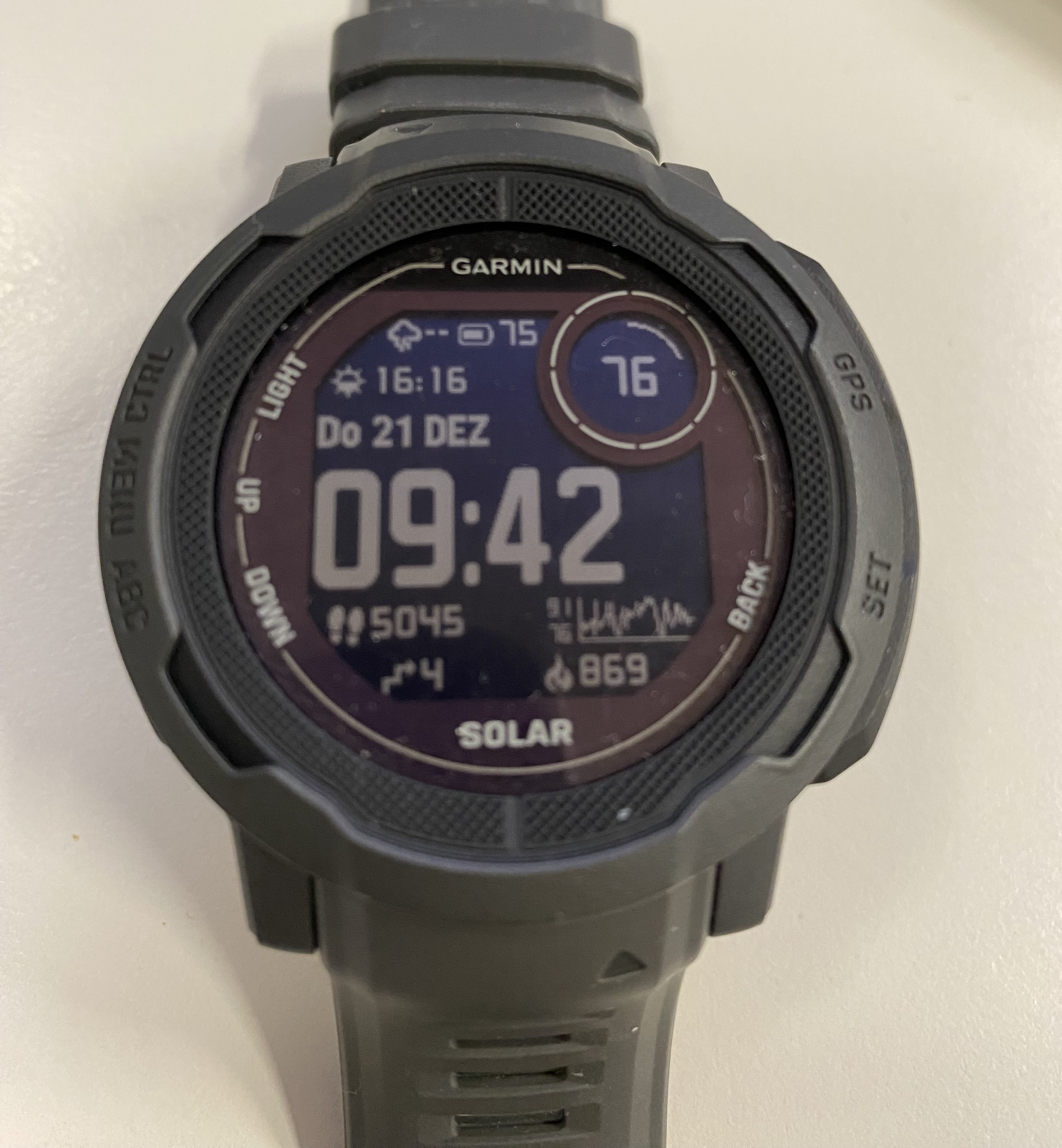
- Garmin Instinct 2 Solar
- Manufacturer: Garmin
- Type: GPS watch
- Introduced: October 11, 2018; 8 years ago

The Garmin Instinct is a line of GPS watches produced by Garmin, introduced in 2018. Marketed as a "strong and rugged outdoor watch", it is described by TechRadar as a more affordable alternative to the Garmin Fenix series of GPS sports smartwatches.

== Models ==
The first-generation base model of the Instinct was released in 2018 at a list price of $299.99 in the United States, alongside a model that can be charged by solar power that started at $399.99. Tom's Guide found the model's design to be reminiscent of the Casio G-Shock. The watch is available in four colors and its case is 45mm in diameter, with a polymer bezel and 22mm silicone Garmin QuickFit strap. The first-generation Instinct has a MIL-STD-810 rating and is indicated to be able to withstand up to 10 atmospheres of pressure. Its fully round backlit memory-in-pixel (MIP) LCD screen is always on and sports a display resolution of 128×128 pixels, but lacks a touchscreen, requiring the use of five physical buttons for navigating menus. The first-generation Instinct integrates with the Garmin Connect app on Android and iOS, but does not support the Garmin Connect IQ app store. The watch features a compass and support for Garmin's inReach satellite communications network, providing SMS support over the Iridium satellite constellation. It is marketed with a two-week battery life that is reduced to 16 hours while in GPS mode, although it can be extended to 40 hours in UltraTrac mode, which reduces GPS tracking rates. Garmin also announced the Instinct Esports Edition, marketed towards esports players, which broadcasts biometric data like the wearer's heart rate and "stress level" to streaming media platforms via the watch's STR3AMUP app.

The slimmer Instinct 2, announced in February 2022, features an overhauled design, and additional color options, with its 45mm version released at $349.99 in the US. Its solar-charged variant was released at $449, marketed as having "unlimited" battery life. The Instinct 2 comes in three screen diameter variants: the 40mm variant features a 156×156 pixel screen; the 45mm and 50mm variants both feature a 176×176 pixel screen. The second generation added support for high-intensity interval training (HIIT) workouts, run pacing and multi-sport activity tracking. Unlike its predecessor, the Instinct 2 supports Garmin Pay and the Garmin Connect IQ app store. Garmin also announced the Instinct 2 Dezl Edition, marketed towards truck drivers.

The Instinct 3 was announced in January 2025, featuring an AMOLED screen, aluminum-reinforced bezel and built-in LED flashlight. The Instinct 3 comes in a 45mm diameter variant with a 390×390 pixel screen and a 50mm diameter variant with a 416×416 pixel screen, with the 45mm version starting at $449 in the US, £389 in the UK and AU$829 in Australia. The 45mm variant's "smartwatch"-mode battery life is rated to last up to 18 days, down from the Instinct 2's 28 days. The Instinct 3 is the first series in the product line to use Garmin's SatIQ technology, using multiple bands for satellite positioning across GPS, GLONASS and Galileo constellations.

The Instinct E series, available in 40mm and 45mm case sizes, was announced alongside the Instinct 3, featuring an MIP screen, no solar-charged variant, no flashlight and no aluminum bezel.

== Comparison of models ==
Specification		Instinct	Instinct 2	Instinct 3 (AMOLED)	Instinct 3 (Solar)	Instinct E
Resistance	Water	10 atmospheres				
Connectivity	Bluetooth	Yes	Yes	Yes	Yes	Yes
Connectivity	ANT+	Yes	Yes	Yes	Yes	Yes
Connectivity	Smartphone compatibility	iPhone, Android				
Satellite navigation	All models	GPS, GLONASS and Galileo				
Satellite navigation	QZSS	No	No	Yes	No	No
Satellite navigation	BeiDou	No	No	Yes	No	No
Satellite navigation	Garmin SatIQ	No	No	Yes	Yes	No
Sensors	Pulse oximeter	No	Yes	Yes	Yes	Yes
Sensors	Other	Barometric altimeter, compass, accelerometer and thermometer				
Input and display	Display type	Monochrome, transflective memory-in-pixel (MIP) LCD		AMOLED	MIP LCD	MIP LCD
Input and display	Display size	0.9×0.9in (23×23mm)	40mm: 0.79×0.79in (20×20mm); 45mm: 0.9×0.9in (23×23mm); 50mm: 1.1×1.1in (27×27mm)	45mm: 1.2in (30mm) diameter 50mm: 1.3in (33mm) diameter	45mm: 0.9×0.9in (23×23mm); 50mm: 1.1×1.1in (27×27mm)	40mm: 0.86×0.86in (22×22mm); 45mm: 0.9×0.9in (23×23mm)
Input and display	Diagonal size and resolution	45mm: 128×128 pixels	40mm: 156×156 pixels (2S); 45mm: 176×176 pixels 50mm: 176×176 pixels (2X)	45mm: 390×390 pixels 50mm: 416×416 pixels	45mm: 176×176 pixels 50mm: 176×176 pixels	40mm: 166×166 pixels 45mm: 176×176 pixels
Battery	Battery life (smartwatch mode)	14 days	40mm: 21 days 45mm: 28 days 50mm: 40 days with solar	45mm: 18 days 50mm: 24 days	45mm: 28 days 50mm: 40 days (listed as "unlimited" when solar charging is used)	40mm: 14 days 45mm: 16 days
Battery	Battery life (smartwatch battery saver mode)	—N/a	40mm: 50 days 45mm: 65 days 50mm: 100 days	45mm: 24 days 50mm: 30 days	—N/a	40mm: 35 days 45mm: 40 days
Battery	Battery life (GPS mode)	16h UltraTrac: 40h	40mm: 22 hours 45mm: 30 hours 50mm: 60 hours; solar: 145 hours	45mm: 32 hours 50mm: 40 hours	—N/a	40mm: 21 hours 45mm: 24 hours
Battery	Battery life (GPS max battery mode)	—N/a	40mm: 54 hours 45mm: 70 hours	45mm: 68 hours 50mm: 86 hours	—N/a	40mm: 43 hours 45mm: 50 hours
Battery	Battery life (Expedition GPS mode)	—N/a	40mm: 25 days 45mm: 32 days 50mm: 60 days	45mm: 16 days 50mm: 20 days	—N/a	40mm: 17 days 45mm: 20 days
Chipset	RAM	16 MB	40mm: 32 MB; 45mm: 32 MB; 50mm: 64 MB	4 GB	128 MB	128 MB
Software features	Find My Garmin	No	No	Yes	Yes	Yes
Software features	Garmin Connect IQ	No	Yes	Yes (on-device)	Yes (on-device)	Yes (on-device)
Software features	Garmin Share	No	No	Yes	Yes	Yes
Dates	Announced	October 11, 2018	February 9, 2022	January 6, 2025	January 6, 2025	—N/a
