= Nimoca =

Contactless smart card system in Kyushu and Hakodate, Japan

nimoca with a commuter pass

How to use nimoca card in a ticket gate

Nimoca (Japanese: ニモカ, romanized: Nimoka), stylized in lowercase as nimoca, is a rechargeable contactless smart card ticketing system for public transport in Fukuoka Prefecture, Japan. Nishi-Nippon Railroad (Nishitetsu) introduced the system on May 18, 2008. Its name is an acronym of "nice money card", while nimo (にも) in Japanese means "also", as the card is usable also on buses, also on trains, also for shopping, and so on. Like other electronic fare collection systems in Japan, the card uses FeliCa, an RFID technology developed by Sony.

The card features a ferret named Nimoca-chan as the official mascot.

Nimoca can be used across Japan as part of the Nationwide Mutual Usage Service. Along with all trains in Fukuoka, Nimoca is usable on most local, highway, and express bus lines in Fukuoka and neighboring prefectures, including those operated by Nishitetsu Group, Showa Bus, Oita Bus, Oita Kōtsū, Kamenoi Bus, and Showa Bus. As electronic money, Nimoca can be used in Solaria Plaza, Solaria Stage, Tenjin Core, Nishitetsu Store (along Tenjin-Ōmuta Line), and more.

In 2017, the card was expanded to public transport in Hakodate, Hokkaido.

== Types of cards ==
- nimoca
- Star nimoca (requires registration; can be reissued if lost)
- Credit nimoca (requires registration; includes credit card functionality)

All registered cards can also function as commuter passes. Other variants and designs, such as the tsu-tsu-nimoca (issued in Saga), nagasaki nimoca (issued in Nagasaki), ICAS nimoca (issued in Hakodate), and Mejiron nimoca (formerly issued in Ōita), also exist.

== Interoperation ==
Interoperation map

On March 13, 2010, nimoca began interoperation with Fukuoka City Transportation Bureau's Hayakaken, JR Kyushu's SUGOCA, and JR East's Suica smart cards. In 2013, interoperation was extended country-wide, and nimoca became usable in all major cities across Japan as part of the Nationwide Mutual Usage Service.

Five bus and train operators in Kumamoto will cease to accept the cards by 2026.
