= SUGOCA =

Smart card ticketing system used in Fukuoka Prefecture, Japan

- Location: Usable nationwide Distributed in Kyushu
- Launched: March 1, 2009 (17 years ago)
- Operator: Kyushu Railway Company
- Manager: Kyushu Railway Company
- Currency: Japanese yen
- Stored-value: Pay as you go
- Auto recharge: None
- Unlimited use: None (Other non-related unlimited use passes available)
- Validity: JR Kyushu; Nishitetsu; Fukuoka City Subway; Kitakyushu Monorail; Valid areas of Kitaca, PASMO, Suica, manaca, toica, ICOCA, PiTaPa, Hayakaken, nimoca
- Variants: SUGOCA 乗車券 (Jōshaken) – rechargeable card; SUGOCA定期券 (Teikiken) – commuter pass; SUGOCAエクセルパス (Excel Pass) – non-reserved seats of limited express; SUGOMON Pass
- Website: www.jrkyushu.co.jp/sugoca/

SUGOCA (Japanese: スゴカ, romanized: Sugoka) is a Japanese rechargeable contactless smart card ticketing system for public transport in and around Fukuoka Prefecture. The Kyushu Railway Company (JR Kyushu) introduced the system on March 1, 2009. The name comes from "Smart Urban Going Card", while sugoka (凄か) in the local Kyūshū dialect means "great". Like other electronic fare collection systems in Japan, the card uses RFID technology developed by Sony Corporation, known as FeliCa. American graphic artist Rodney Alan Greenblat designed its official mascot, a frog with a clock.

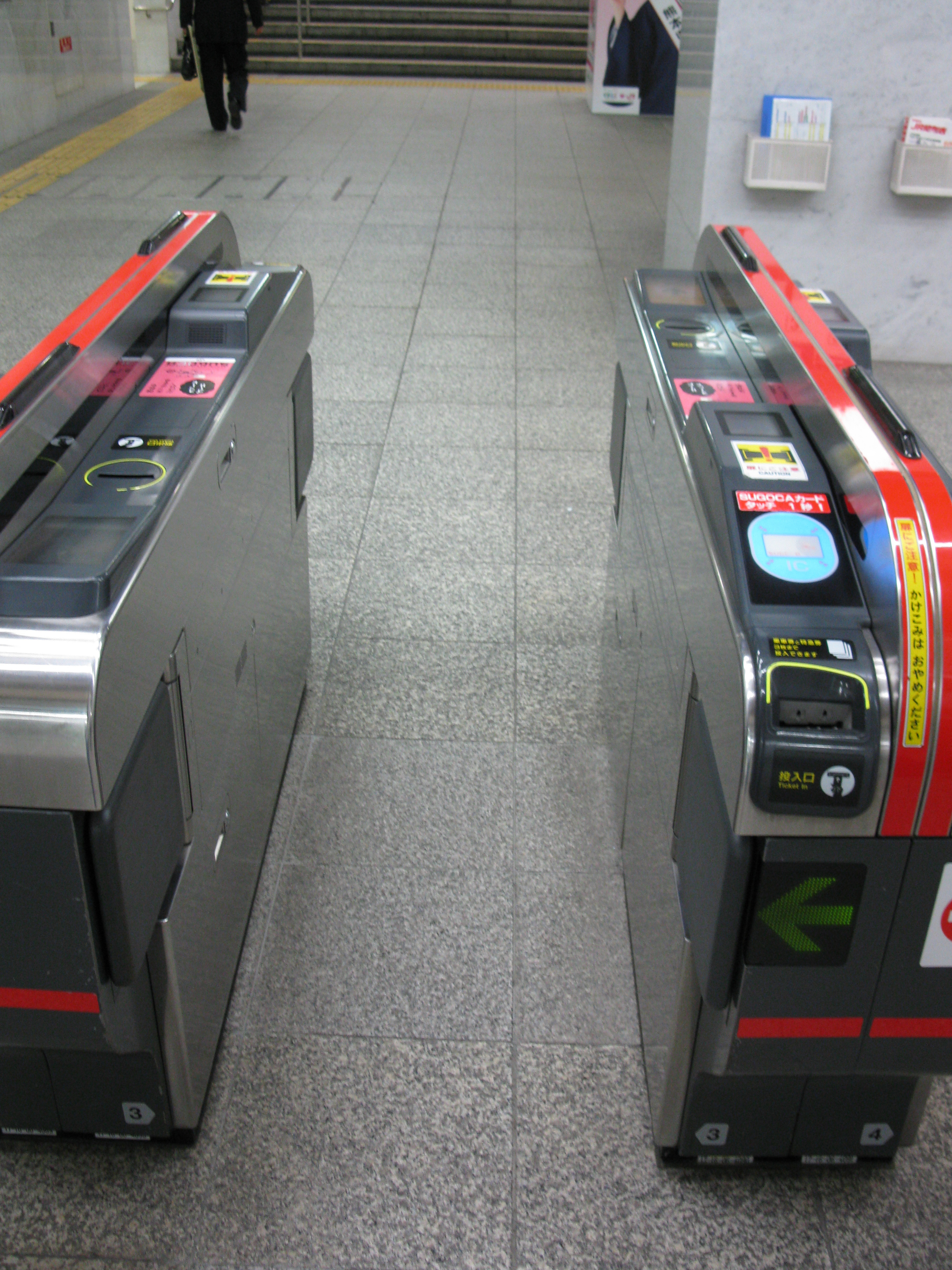
Ticket gates with SUGOCA support

How to use a SUGOCA card

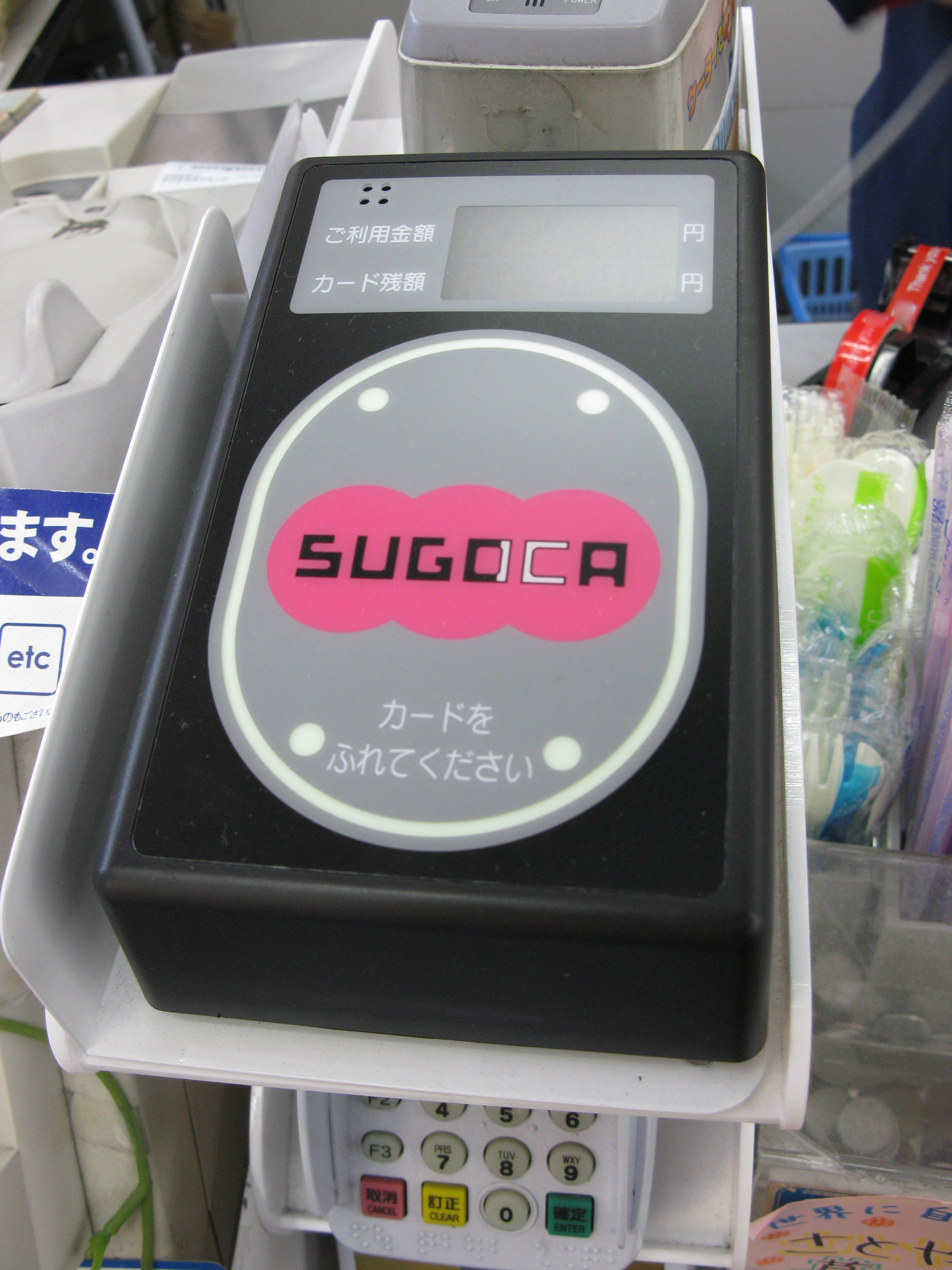
SUGOCA IC card reader at a store

On March 13, 2010, SUGOCA began interoperation with Nishitetsu's nimoca, Fukuoka City's Hayakaken, and JR East's Suica. On March 5, 2011, in a reciprocal agreement with JR Central and JR West, SUGOCA became usable in the Keihanshin, Okayama–Hiroshima, and Nagoya metropolitan areas. In 2013, interoperation was extended country-wide, and SUGOCA became usable in nearly all major cities across Japan as part of the Nationwide Mutual Usage Service.

== Usable area ==
SUGOCA was launched on March 1, 2009. Initially, it was usable at 124 JR stations in Fukuoka Prefecture, mainly in the Fukuoka–Kitakyushu area. By 2024, IC card support in Kyushu had further, including use on the following lines and stations:

- Chikuhi Line: Meinohama to Karatsu
- Chikuhō Main Line: (Fukuhoku Yutaka Line & Wakamatsu Line): Wakamatsu to Keisen
- Hohi Main Line: Kumamoto to Higo-Ōzu, and Naka-Handa to Ōita
  - de facto allow travelling between Higo-Ōzu and Naka-Handa if no alights of train on halfway stations
- Ibusuki Makurazaki Line: Kagoshima-Chūō to Kiire
- Kagoshima Main Line: Mojikō to Yatsushiro, and Sendai to Kagoshima (the currently whole line)
- Karatsu Line: Karatsu to Nishi-Karatsu
- Kashii Line (Umi-no-Nakamichi Line): the whole line
- Kyudai Main Line: Kurume to Zendōji, and Mukainoharu to Ōita
  - de facto allow travelling between Zendōji and Mukainoharu if no alights of train on halfway stations
- Miyazaki Kuko Line: the whole line
- Nagasaki Main Line: Tosu to Kōhoku, and Isahaya to Nagasaki (including the Nagayo branch)
- Nichinan Line: Minami-Miyazaki to Tayoshi
- Nippō Main Line: Nishi-Kokura to Kōzaki, Sadowara to Tano, and Kokubu to Kagoshima (except for Ryūgamizu)
- Omura Line: Isahaya to Takematsu, and Haiki to Huis Ten Bosch
- Sanyō Main Line: Shimonoseki to Moji
- Sasaguri Line (Fukuhoku Yutaka Line): the whole line
- Sasebo Line: the whole line

== Types of cards ==
SUGOCA are available in either unregistered (anonymous) or registered variants. Registered cards must be purchased from ticket offices rather than ticket machine, and allow riders' cards to be reissued if lost. Commuter passes, including a "SUGOCA Excel Pass" (SUGOCAエクセルパス, SUGOCA Ekuseru Pasu) which allows commuting on limited express and shinkansen trains, are also available.

Other SUGOCA variants and designs also exist, such the mono SUGOCA, featuring a design of Kokura Station, sold by Kitakyushu Monorail since October 1, 2015. "Special Design" pink-colored cards are also available.

On January 23, 2020, JR Kyushu launched a tourist-focused "SUGOMON Pass" in limited quantities. The card's design features Kumamon, the official mascot of Kumamoto.

== Extended functionality ==
SUGOCA's functionality includes electronic money which can be used at stores, restaurants, vending machines, convenience stores.

Part of the Nationwide Mutual Usage Service, SUGOCA is usable on public transportation across Japan.

== See also ==
- ICOCA (JR West: Kansai-area "Urban Network" and Hiroshima-Okayama metropolitan area)
- Nimoca
- Suica (JR East: Kantō area)
- TOICA (JR Central: Nagoya metropolitan area)
