= Hayakaken =

Contactless smart card system in Fukuoka, Japan

はやかけん
- Front of a Hayakaken (2008)
- Location: Usable nationwide Distributed in Fukuoka
- Launched: 7 March, 2009
- Manager: Fukuoka City Transportation Bureau
- Currency: Japanese yen
- Stored-value: Pay as you go
- Credit expiry: 10 years after last use
- Retailed: Fukuoka City Subway stations
- Website: http://subway.city.fukuoka.lg.jp/hayakaken/

How to use Hayakaken card in a ticket gate

Hayakaken (はやかけん) is a rechargeable contactless smart card ticketing system for public transport in Fukuoka, Fukuoka Prefecture, Japan. Fukuoka City Transportation Bureau introduced the system on March 7, 2009. Its name derives from the words quick (速い, hayai), friendly (優しい, yasashii), comfortable (快適, kaiteki), and ticket (券, ken). Hayakaken (速かけん) also means "because it's quick" in the local Hakata dialect.

On March 13, 2010, Hayakaken began interoperation with Nishitetsu's nimoca, JR Kyushu's SUGOCA, and JR East's Suica smart cards. In 2013, interoperation was extended country-wide, and Hayakaken became usable in all major cities across Japan as part of the Nationwide Mutual Usage Service.

== Design ==
The card features the face of Chikamaru (ちかまる), the Fukuoka City Transportation Bureau's prairie dog mascot. Like other electronic fare collection systems in Japan, the card uses RFID technology developed by Sony corporation known as FeliCa. An alternate design, named "ANA Hayakaken", was released in cooperation with All Nippon Airways.

== Types of cards ==
- Unregistered card
- Registered card (allowing for reissue if lost)
- Commuter pass
