= PiTaPa =

Contactless smart card and electronic money system

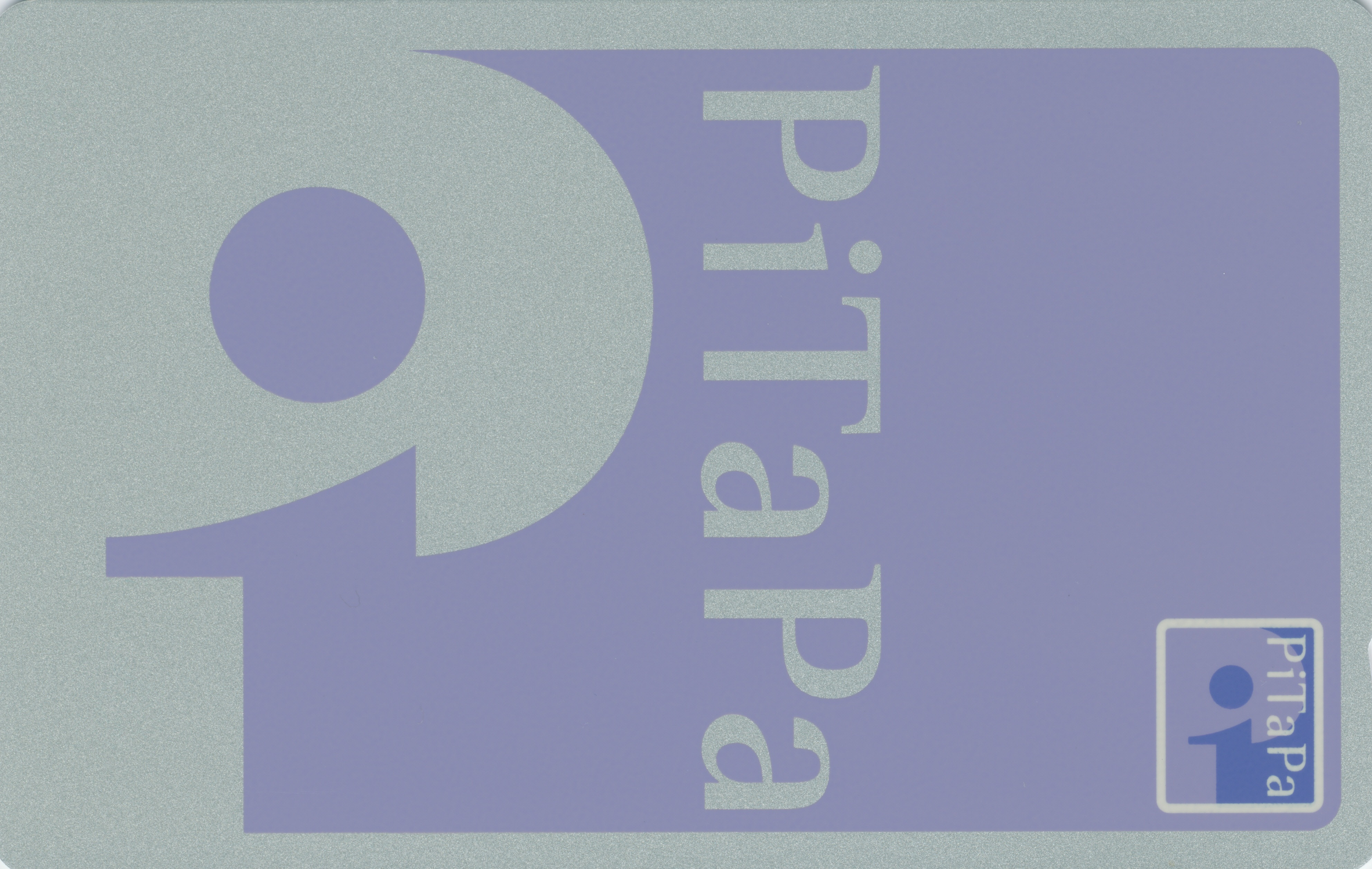
PiTaPa Basic Card

PiTaPa (Japanese: ピタパ, romanized: Pitapa) is a contactless smart card ticketing and electronic money system used predominantly the Kansai region of Japan. The name PiTaPa from "Postpay IC for Touch and Pay". In the Osaka area, PiTaPa is usable on the Osaka Municipal Subway and New Tram, Keihan Electric Railway, and Hankyu Railway. It launched on August 1, 2004.

Part of the Nationwide Mutual Usage Service, PiTaPa is usable on public transport across Japan. Unlike Japan's other major IC cards, PiTaPa operates as a post-pay system, rather than as a prepaid card.

How to use PiTaPa card

== System overview ==
PiTaPa is operated by Surutto KANSAI, a private company composed of various transit companies and transportation bureaus.

Unlike most other electronic fare collection systems and IC cards in Japan, including JR East's Suica and JR West's ICOCA which operate on a "pre-pay" basis, PiTaPa is a "post-pay" card. Usage of the card is charged to the customer's account, and each month the balance owing is deducted from a designated bank account, as in a charge card. As such, a credit check is required to obtain a PiTaPa card, and the allowable balance is capped. This prevents short-time overseas visitors or short-term residents of Japan from obtaining or using PiTaPa.

Beginning in June 2006, people over 20 could obtain a PiTaPa secured by a deposit in lieu of the credit check, although these cards could only be used to pay transport fares or in limited stores, without the electronic money functions of a normal credit card. This service was discontinued in March 2022.

The underlying technology behind PiTaPa is an RFID technology developed by Sony called FeliCa.

== Card types ==
"PiTaPa Basic Card" is the name given to the PiTaPa cards per se, and are issued by the Surutto KANSAI Conference.

Most traffic companies in the PiTaPa network issue PiTaPa-compatible cards of their brands, either on their own or jointly with other companies. The cards, called "PiTaPa Affiliate Cards" by the Surutto KANSAI Conference, typically are built within credit cards and have special services or discounts offered by its issuers.

In 2006, because of heavy marketing of the Affiliate Cards by the individual companies, Basic Cards constituted only 10–20 percent of all issued PiTaPa cards.

== History ==
The concept to introduce a smart card fare system in the Kansai region was first announced on July 7, 2001, by the Surutto KANSAI Conference. The Conference initially announced in April 2002 that they were planning to consign operation of the system to Hitachi and JCB, but switched to the Japan Research Institute and Sumitomo Mitsui Card Company in July 2003. The name "PiTaPa" was made public on February 25, 2003.

After four months of initial monitor testing, the service officially started on August 1, 2004, with three participating companies: Hankyu, Keihan and Nose Railway.

== Companies and bureaus accepting PiTaPa ==
Interoperation map

In 2013, PiTaPa became usable in all major cities across Japan as part of the Nationwide Mutual Usage Service. Prior to this, PiTaPa had been implemented and released as part of Affiliate Cards by a variety of companies and operators:

=== Rail ===
Company name	Name of affiliate card	Joined
Hankyu Railway	HANA PLUS Card †	August 1, 2004
Hankyu Railway	STACIA Card	October 1, 2007
Nose Electric Railway	HANA PLUS Card †	August 1, 2004
Nose Electric Railway	STACIA Card	October 1, 2007
Keihan Electric Railway	e-kenet PiTaPa	August 1, 2004
Osaka Metro	OSAKA PiTaPa	February 1, 2006
Hanshin Electric Railway	CoCoNet PiTaPa Card †	February 1, 2006
Hanshin Electric Railway	STACIA Card	October 1, 2007
Osaka Monorail	HANA PLUS Card †	February 1, 2006
Osaka Monorail	STACIA Card	October 1, 2007
Kita-Osaka Kyuko Railway	HANA PLUS Card †	February 1, 2006
Kita-Osaka Kyuko Railway	STACIA Card	October 1, 2007
Nankai Electric Railway	Nankai Group Card minapita	July 1, 2006
Semboku Rapid Railway	Nankai Group Card minapita	July 1, 2006
Kobe Rapid Railway	KOBE PiTaPa	July 1, 2006
Kobe New Transit	KOBE PiTaPa	July 1, 2006
Sanyo Electric Railway	KOBE PiTaPa	July 1, 2006
Okayama Electric Tramway	(no original PiTaPa brand)	October 1, 2006
Kobe Municipal Transportation Bureau	KOBE PiTaPa	October 1, 2006
Hokushin Kyuko Railway	KOBE PiTaPa	October 1, 2006
Kintetsu Railway	KIPS PiTaPa	April 1, 2007
Kobe Electric Railway	KOBE PiTaPa	April 1, 2007
Kyoto Municipal Transportation Bureau	Kyoto+ OSAKA PiTaPa	April 1, 2007
Shizuoka Railway	LuLuCa+PiTaPa	September 1, 2007

- † Eventually merged and renamed to "STACIA Card".

=== Buses ===
Company name	Name of affiliate card	Joined
Osaka Municipal Transportation Bureau	OSAKA PiTaPa	February 1, 2006
Hankyu Bus	HANA PLUS Card †	February 1, 2006
Hankyu Bus	STACIA Card	October 1, 2007
Shinki Bus & Shinki Zone Bus	(no original PiTaPa brand)	February 1, 2006
Osaka Airport Transport	(no original PiTaPa brand)	October 1, 2006
Okayama Electric Tramway	(no original PiTaPa brand)	October 1, 2006
Shimotsui Dentetsu	(no original PiTaPa brand)	October 1, 2006
Ryobi Bus	(no original PiTaPa brand)	October 1, 2006
Nara Kotsu	(no original PiTaPa brand)	April 1, 2007
NC Bus	(no original PiTaPa brand)	April 1, 2007
Shizutetsu Just Line	LuLuCa+PiTaPa	September 1, 2007
Keihan Bus	e-kenet PiTaPa	October 1, 2007
Keihan Kyoto Kotsu	e-kenet PiTaPa	March 1, 2008
Takatsuki City Transportation	(no original PiTaPa brand)	April 1, 2008
Itami City Transportation	(no original PiTaPa brand)	April 1, 2008

- † Eventually merged and renamed to "STACIA Card".

=== Other cards ===
Issuer	Name of card	Company name
Surutto KANSAI Conference	PiTaPa Basic Card	Surutto KANSAI Conference
Hankyu Hanshin Card	Persona STACIA Card	Persona
Hankyu Hanshin Card	Takarazuka Revue STACIA Card	Takarazuka Revue
Hankyu Hanshin Card	Hankyu Hanshin Dai-ichi Hotel Group STACIA Card	Hankyu Hanshin Hotels
Hankyu Hanshin Card	STACIA+sai-ca Card	Bank Of Ikeda
All Nippon Airways	ANA PiTaPa Card	All Nippon Airways
Sumitomo Mitsui Card	Sumitomo Mitsui PiTaPa Card	Sumitomo Mitsui Card
Nankai Electric Railway	KANKU CLUB Card	Kansai International Airport
Kansai Electric Power	Happy e PiTaPa Card	Kansai Electric Power

== See also ==
- ICOCA
- List of smart cards
