= Pasmo =

Contactless smart card used in Japan

PASMO
- Location: Usable nationwide Distributed in the Greater Tokyo Area
- Launched: March 18, 2007
- Technology: FeliCa
- Manager: PASMO Co., Ltd.
- Currency: Japanese yen (¥20,000 maximum load)
- Stored-value: Pay as you go
- Credit expiry: Ten years after last use
- Retailed: Tokyo Metro stations; Toei Subway stations; Private railways
- Variants: PASMO; PASMO PASSPORT
- Website: www.pasmo.co.jp

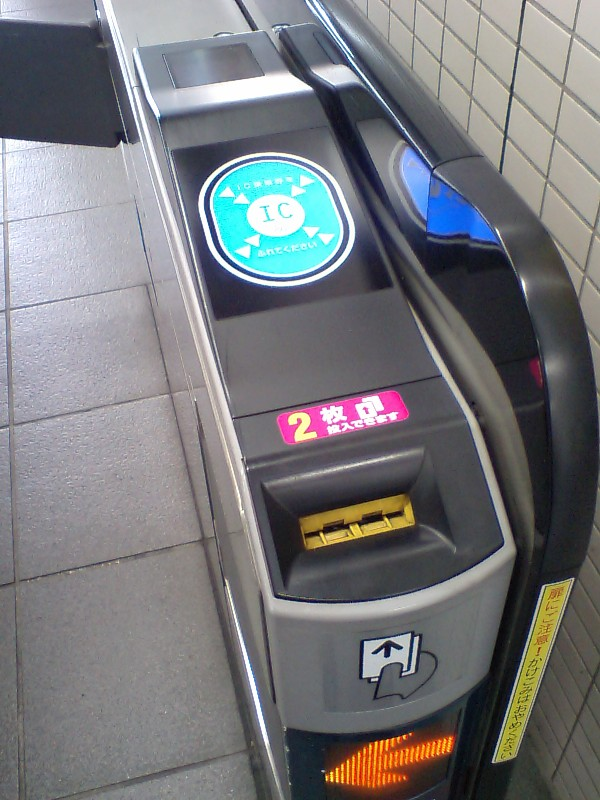
PASMO-compatible ticket gates at Ōtorii Station (Keikyu Line)

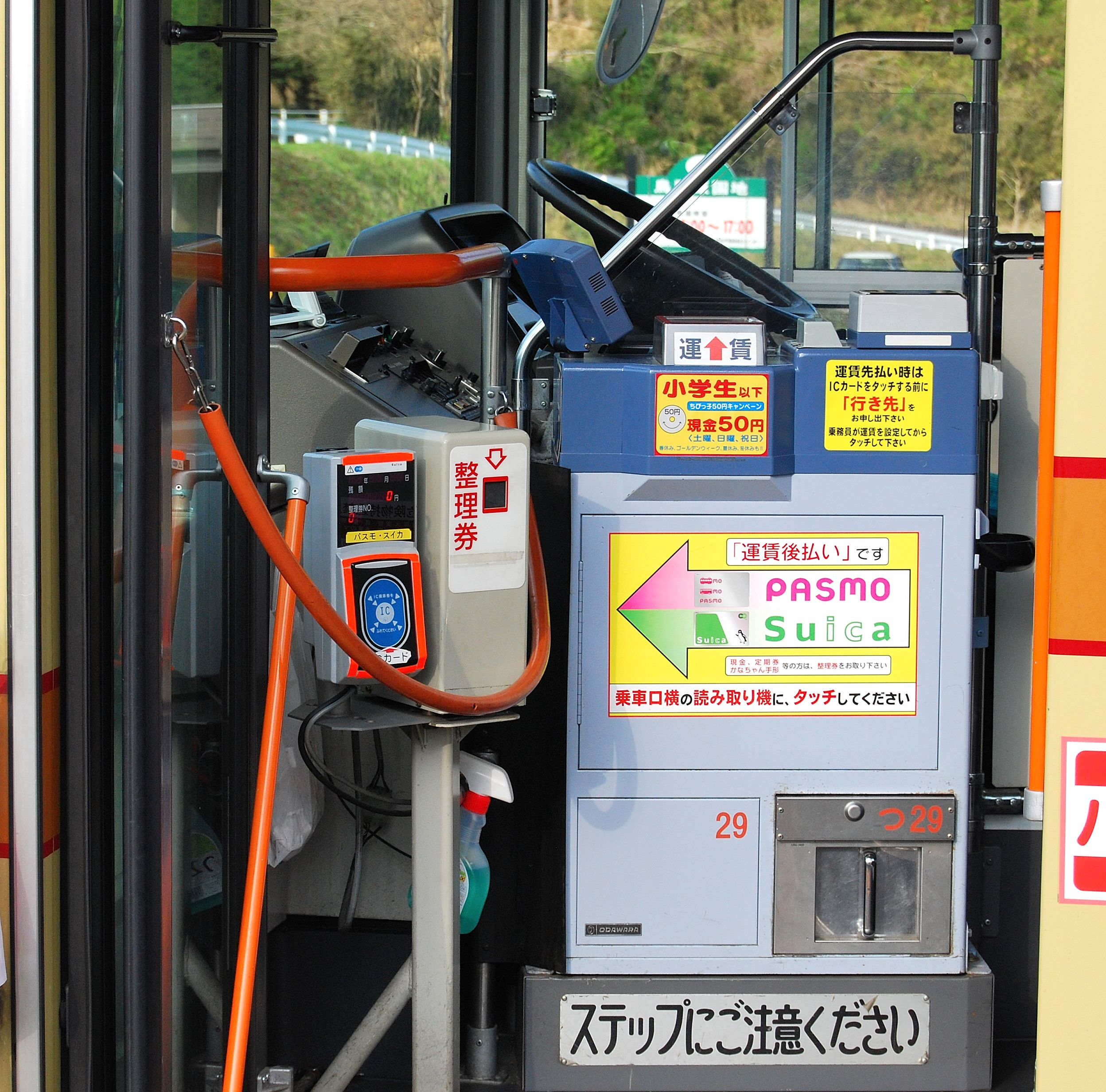
Reader for accepting IC cards taps, including PASMO and Suica, installed next the driver's seat and fare box aboard a KANACHU bus in Kanagawa

Pasmo (stylized as PASMO) is a rechargeable contactless smart card electronic money system. It is primarily used for public transport in Tokyo, Japan, where it was introduced on 18 March 2007. Pasmo can also be used as a payment card for vending machines and stores. In 2013, Pasmo became usable in all major cities across Japan as part of the Nationwide Mutual Usage Service.

Pasmo is a development of the Passnet system used by many non-JR railway lines in the Greater Tokyo Area. The system offers interoperability with the JR East Suica system, as well as integrating private bus companies into the former Passnet network.

The technology is based on an RFID technology developed by Sony known as FeliCa. As of April 2009, there were over 11 million cards in circulation.

== Companies and organizations accepting Pasmo ==
=== Railways ===
Most railway operators introduced the system simultaneously when Pasmo started.

- Chiba Urban Monorail (since 14 March 2009)
- Enoshima Electric Railway (Enoden)
- Hakone Tozan Railway
- Hokuso Railway
- Izu Hakone Railway (Daiyuzan Line only)
- Keikyu
- Keio Corporation
- Keisei Electric Railway
- Metropolitan Intercity Railway Company (Tsukuba Express)
- Nippori-Toneri Liner
- Odakyu Electric Railway
- Sagami Railway (Sōtetsu)
- Saitama Railway
- Seibu Railway
- Tama Toshi Monorail
- Tobu Railway
- Tokyu Corporation
- Tokyo Metro
- Tokyo Metropolitan Bureau of Transportation (Toei Subway)
- Toyo Rapid Railway
- Yokohama City Transportation Bureau (Yokohama Subway)
- Yokohama Minatomirai Railway Company
- Yokohama New Transit (Kanazawa Seaside Line)
- Yurikamome
- Chichibu Railway (since 2022)

=== Buses and tramways ===
Bus and tramway operators have been introducing Pasmo readers on their systems gradually.

- Chiba Kotsu
- Enoshima Electric Railway
  - Enoden Bus
- Fuji Kyuko
  - Fuji Express
  - Fujikyu City Bus
  - Fujikyu Heiwa Kanko
  - Fujikyu Shizuoka Bus
  - Fujikyu Shonan Bus
  - Fujikyu Yamanashi Bus
- Hakone Tozan Bus
  - Odakyu Hakone Highway Bus
- Heiwa Kotsu
  - Danchi Kotsu
- Hitachi Jidosha Kotsu
- Izu Hakone Railway
- Kanagawa Chuo Kotsu
  - Fujisawa Kanako Bus
  - Sagami Kanako Bus
  - Shonan Kanako Bus
  - Tsukui Kanako Bus
  - Yokohama Kanako Bus
- Kanto Bus
  - KB Bus
- Kawasaki City Transportation Bureau (Kawasaki City Bus)
- Kawasaki Tsurumi Rinko Bus
  - Rinko Green Bus
- Keihin Kyuko Bus
  - Haneda Keikyu Bus
  - Shonan Keikyu Bus
  - Yokohama Keikyu Bus
- Keio Bus
  - Keio Bus Chūō
  - Keio Bus Higashi
  - Keio Bus Koganei
  - Keio Bus Minami
  - Keio Dentetsu Bus
- Keisei Bus
  - Chiba Chuo Bus
  - Chiba City Bus
  - Chiba Flower Bus
  - Chiba Green Bus
  - Chiba Kaihin Kotsu
  - Chiba Nairiku Bus
  - Chiba Rainbow Bus
  - Ichikawa Kotsu Jidosha (Ichikawa Line Bus)
  - Keisei Town Bus
  - Keisei Transit Bus
  - Tokyo Baycity Kotsu
- Kokusai Kogyo Bus
- Nishi Tokyo Bus
- Odakyu Bus
  - Odakyu City Bus
- Sagami Railway (Sagami Railway Bus)
  - Sotetsu Bus
- Seibu Bus
  - Seibu Kanko Bus
- Tachikawa Bus
- Tobu Bus (Tobu Bus Central)
  - Asahi Motor
  - Ibakyu Motor
  - Kawagoe Motor
  - Kokusai Juo Kotsu
  - Tobu Bus East
  - Tobu Bus West
- Tōkyū Setagaya Line)
- Tokyo Metropolitan Bureau of Transportation (Toei Bus, Toei Streetcar)
- Tokyu Bus
  - Tokyu Transsés
- Yamanashi Kotsu
  - Sanko Town Coach
- Yokohama City Transportation Bureau (Yokohama City Bus)
  - Yokohama Traffic Development

== Popularity ==
On April 11, 2007, it was announced that sales of Pasmo fare cards would be limited to commuter rail pass purchases until August due to extremely high demand. It was originally predicted that approximately 2 million Pasmo cards would be sold in the first month, but actual sales numbers totaled approximately about 3 million. Due to depleting stock, regular Pasmo card sales were suspended and only commuter passes were sold. Sales resumed on September 10, 2007.

== Mobile devices ==
A version for mobile phones known as Mobile Pasmo (モバイルPASMO, Mobairu Pasumo), which uses Mobile FeliCa and Osaifu-Keitai functionality, was launched in March 2020.

== Interoperation ==
Interoperation map

Through collaboration with JR East, passengers became able to use Pasmo interchangeably with Suica to ride nearly any railway, metro, or bus in the Tokyo metropolitan area in 2007. Transit systems/lines outside the Pasmo system but usable with the Pasmo card included JR East lines in the Kanto, Niigata and Sendai area, the Tokyo Monorail, Saitama New Urban Transit (New Shuttle), Sendai Airport Transit, Tokyo Waterfront Area Rapid Transit (Rinkai Line), and JR Bus Kanto (local buses in the Mito area).

In 2013, interoperation was extended country-wide, and Pasmo became usable across Japan as part of the Nationwide Mutual Usage Service.

On July 22, 2014, Nintendo added support for Suica and Pasmo in the Nintendo eShop through the NFC function of the Wii U GamePad and the New Nintendo 3DS. The service was discontinued on January 18, 2022.

== See also ==
- List of smart cards
