= Suica =

Contactless smart card used in Japan

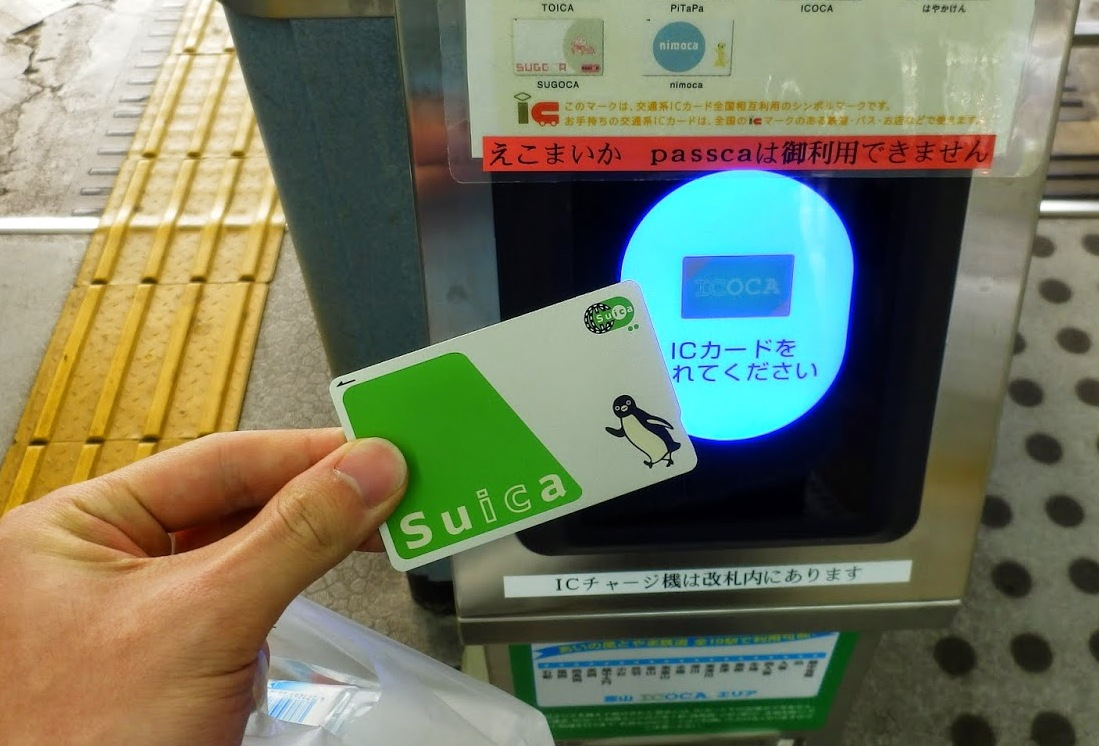
- Suica being tapped in Toyama, Japan
- Location: Nationwide usability, with issuance in: Kantō (Greater Tokyo); Sendai; Niigata; Nagano; Morioka; Aomori; Akita
- Launched: April 8 – July 8, 2001: Pilot at 57 stations November 18, 2001: Official launch at 424 stations
- Technology: FeliCa (NFC-F)
- Manager: JR East
- Currency: Japanese yen (¥20,000 maximum load)
- Stored-value: Pay as you go
- Credit expiry: Ten years after last use
- Auto recharge: Yes
- Validity: JR East; Tokyo Monorail; Tokyo Waterfront Area Rapid Transit; Saitama New Urban Transit; Izukyu Corporation; Fuji Kyuko; Sendai Airport Transit; Okinawa Urban Monorail; JR Bus Kanto; JR Bus Tohoku; JR Bus Tech; Nozawa Onsen Kotsu
- Retailed: Ticket machines; JR East Ticket Offices
- Variants: Rinkai Suica; Welcome Suica; Monorail Suica (formerly); Multi-function Cards for Regional Transit; VIEW Suica Card; Student/Employee ID Suica; Japan Post IC Cash Card; Suica Light
- Website: www.jreast.co.jp/multi/en/suica/

Suica (occasionally written in Japanese as スイカ, Suika) is a prepaid, rechargeable, contactless smart card and electronic money system used as a fare card on train lines and other public transport systems in Japan, launched on November 18, 2001, by the East Japan Railway Company (JR East). The card can be used across the nation as part of Japan's Nationwide Mutual Usage Service, including support on virtually any train, tramway, or bus system in the Greater Tokyo Area. The card is also widely used as electronic money for purchases at stores and kiosks, especially at convenience stores, chain restaurants, and shops within train stations.

Three years after launch, as of October 2004, over 10 million Suica had been sold. In 2018, JR East reported that Suica was used for 6.6 million daily transactions. As of October 2023, a total of 95.64 million Suica (including Mobile Suica) have been issued, and 1.63 million stores accept payment via Suica's digital currency.

== Etymology ==
Suica is a backronym for "Super Urban Intelligent Card". In the logo, the letters "ic" are highlighted, which stand for "integrated circuit" and see use in the term "IC card", the common Japanese word for smart card. An additional meaning comes from the ideophone "sui sui" which means "to move smoothly and swiftly", intended to highlight the simplicity of using the card compared with traditional (paper) train tickets, similar to how penguins can swim smoothly through water. The motif was also chosen due to the Japanese homonym suika (スイカ; "watermelon"); just like penguins in cold climates have never encountered watermelons, as the first major transportation IC card in Japan, the card was promoted as a never-before-seen item for riders.

The Suica penguin mascot was designed by illustrator Chiharu Sakazaki and is licensed for use by JR East and Dentsu, first appearing in a 1998 picture book by Sakazaki. It is set to be retired in the spring of 2027 and replaced with a purple rabbit mascot.

== Uses ==
While Suica's primary usage is as a fare card for public transportation, it can also be used as electronic money for general purchases. With the exception of archaic, first-generation cards ("Suica IO Card") printed before 2004, all Suica have the logo, which indicates that the card can be used for e-money payments.

Other components that may also appear alongside the e-money mark include:

- Two dots ("●●") below the logo, indicating support for FeliCa Pocket services such as various reward point programs.
  - This mark formerly indicated support for Suica Internet Service, a system that allowed users to charge their Suica via the web, as well as using the card for online shopping via a FeliCa NFC reader/writer peripheral device known as PaSoRi. The service was introduced in July 2009 and retired in February 2021.
- A plus sign ("+") to the right of the logo, designating the card as an "affiliate card" with other attached services. This includes Suica integrated with credit cards (see Credit card integrations), virtual Suica that support recharging via mobile payment (see Mobile Suica), and 2-in-1 Multi-function Cards for Regional Transit.

Suica logo, indicating sensor compatibility with the Suica electronic money system

Chain stores such as FamilyMart, 7-Eleven, Lawson, Yodobashi Camera, Bic Camera, Doutor Coffee, CoCo Ichibanya, and MOS Burger support transactions with Suica. Many shops at airports, and taxis throughout Japan, also accept Suica payment. Stores that accept IC card payment are indicated by displaying the Nationwide Mutual Usage Service "IC" logo, typically alongside the various card logos. Most vending machines, kiosks, and baggage lockers within JR stations can also be paid with the card; the card may also be used as an electronic key to open these lockers.

As of 2004, JR East employees use the card as an employee ID card.

== Functions and services ==
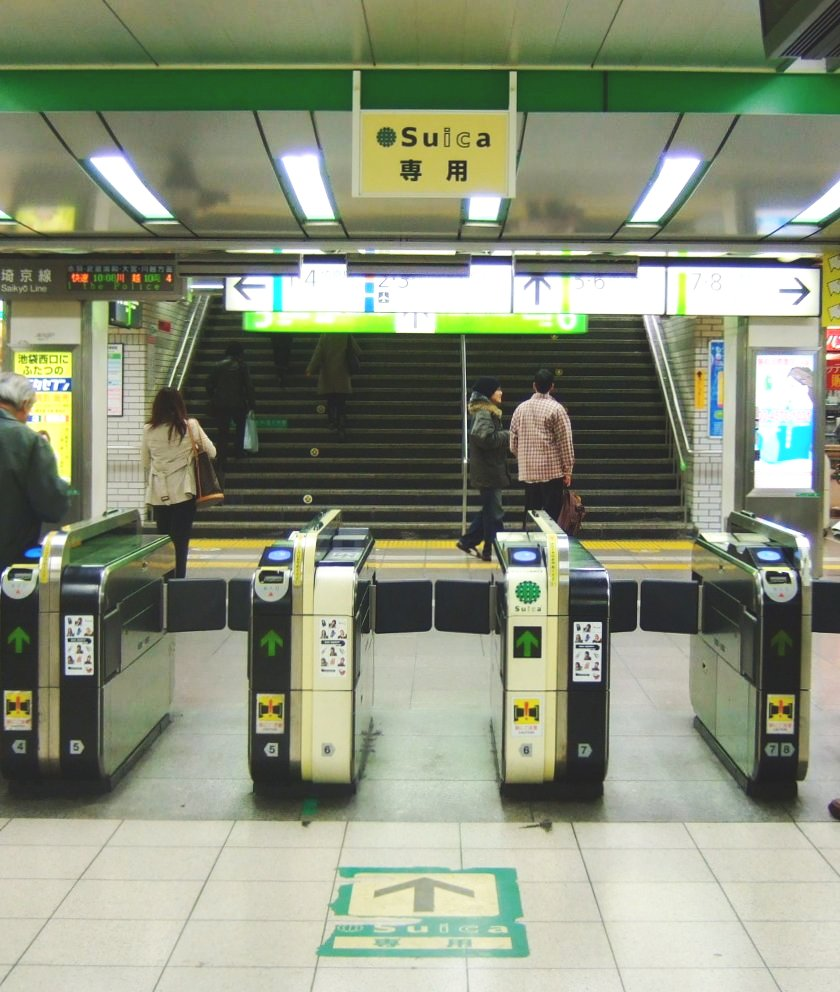
Ticket gates at Ikebukuro Station in 2006. The center lane is exclusive to Suica. Gates have since been replaced to support all major IC cards.

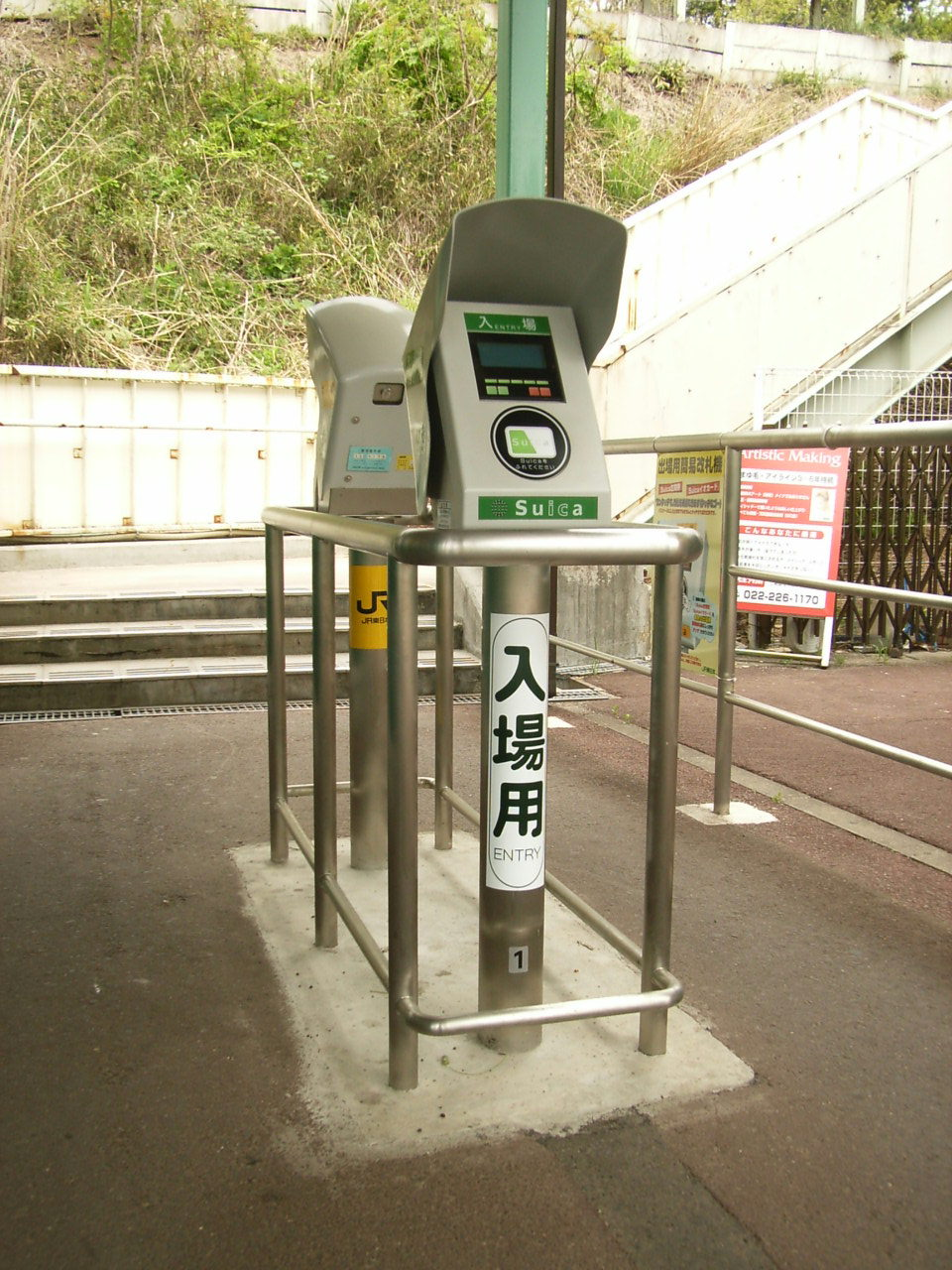
Simple Suica ticket gates at Kuzuoka Station in Sendai. There are separate devices for entering and exiting the station.

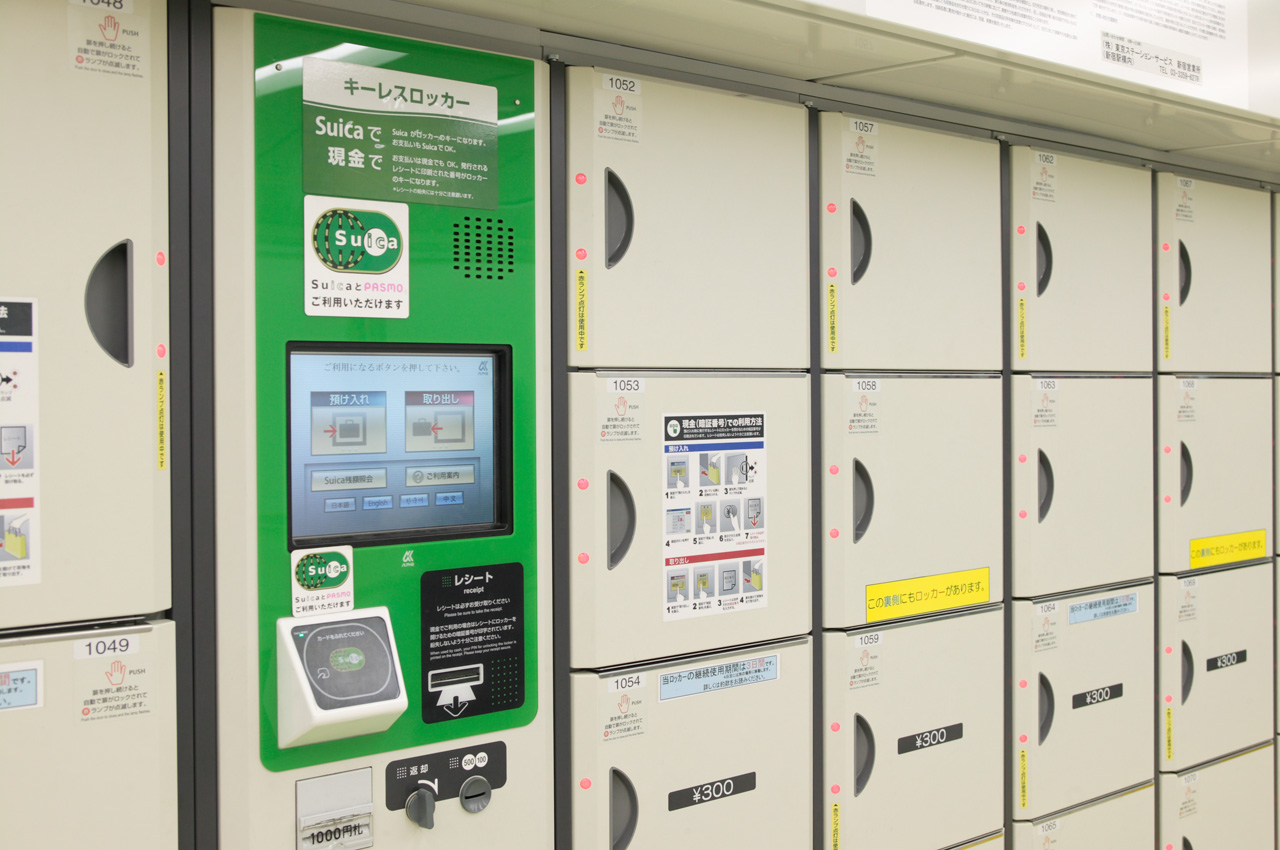
Keyless locker system for Suica and PASMO cards in Shibuya Station

Usage of the card involves scanning it at a card reader. The card's technology allows for it to be read at a short distance from the reader, so contact is not required, despite instructions which often inform users to "touch" (タッチ, tacchi) cards on readers. Many riders leave IC cards in wallets or pass cases, and pass these objects over reader when entering a ticket gate. The balance on the card is displayed when riders pass through ticket gates. In the JR East area, the minimum fare to ride at least one stop is required to enter, but no fare is charged until the user exits the system, upon which cards must be touched on readers at fare gates again.

A travel record of the past 20 trips (or e-money purchases) is stored on the card, and can be displayed or printed out at ticket machines or some fare adjustment machines. The past 100 records are able to be printed at staffed JR East windows or ticket offices.

Along with fare balance, Suica may also store a commuter pass (定期券, teikiken) – pre-purchased fares for a one, three, or six-month period along which allow riders, such as students or employees, to travel between two designated stations along a specified route.

When traveling from a Suica-supported JR East station to either a non-supported station, or to a station operated by another JR Group company, riders must instead purchase a paper ticket. Tickets up to a certain fare value may be purchased with a Suica's balance.

== Points of purchase ==
Suica are available at ticket vending machines or customer service windows in the Suica area, namely at all JR East train stations. A new card costs 2,000 yen, which includes a 500 yen deposit that will be refunded if the card is returned. The remaining 1,500 yen is immediately available for rides on transport, and more money can be charged on to the card (in 500, 1,000, 2,000, 3,000, 4,000, 5,000, and 10,000 yen increments), up to a card maximum of 20,000 yen. Cards may also be charged at fare adjustment machines within any station's ticket gates, i.e. inside the fare-paid zone.

Due to the 2020–2023 global chip shortage, JR East announced a temporary suspension of sales of unregistered cards on June 8, 2023, with a suspension on registered cards following two months later. While Welcome Suica remained on sale to inbound tourists at airports and JR East Travel Service Centers throughout Greater Tokyo, residents were instead encouraged to use Mobile Suica. Standard Suica cards again became available in January 2024 in limited quantities at customer service centers. Registered Suica (My Suica) sales resumed via station ticket vending machines on September 1, 2024, and unregistered cards returned to public sale on March 1, 2025.

== Types of cards ==
Suica are sold by JR East and two of its subsidiaries:

- Suica (and My Suica), Welcome Suica, and VIEW Suica are sold directly by JR East
- Rinkai Suica are sold by Tokyo Waterfront Area Rapid Transit (Rinkai Line)
- Monorail Suica were sold by Tokyo Monorail – was discontinued on March 15, 2025

=== Credit card integrations ===
The View Suica pairs the prepaid Suica with a credit card. Various types of these "affiliate cards" exist, including at least one available through JR and View, and others such as the Bic Camera Suica. These function both as a prepaid Suica as well as a regular credit card, and provide an auto-charge feature to prevent exhausting the Suica balance. The automatically recharged amount is added to the user's credit card bill. Thus, these cards have two balances: a prepaid Suica balance and a credit balance for which monthly bills are sent. Thus, store-related cards like the Bic Suica can include fully three separate functions: serving as a store point card, a general use Suica, and as a credit card. Any credit purchase (restricted, in the case of Bic, to JCB) adds a small amount to the available points on the store point card. Yet another type of Suica offered by Japan Airlines that is called JALCARD Suica. In addition to having Suica and credit card functionalities, a JALCARD Suica can also function as an electronic boarding pass for a JAL-operated domestic flight in Japan at an airport that offers the JAL IC service.

=== My Suica ===
"My Suica" is JR East's term for a Suica registered in one's name. Riders may input their personal information at the time the card is created which allows for a transfer of balance if the card is lost, stolen, or breaks. Child versions (which charge half fares) are also available.

=== Welcome Suica ===
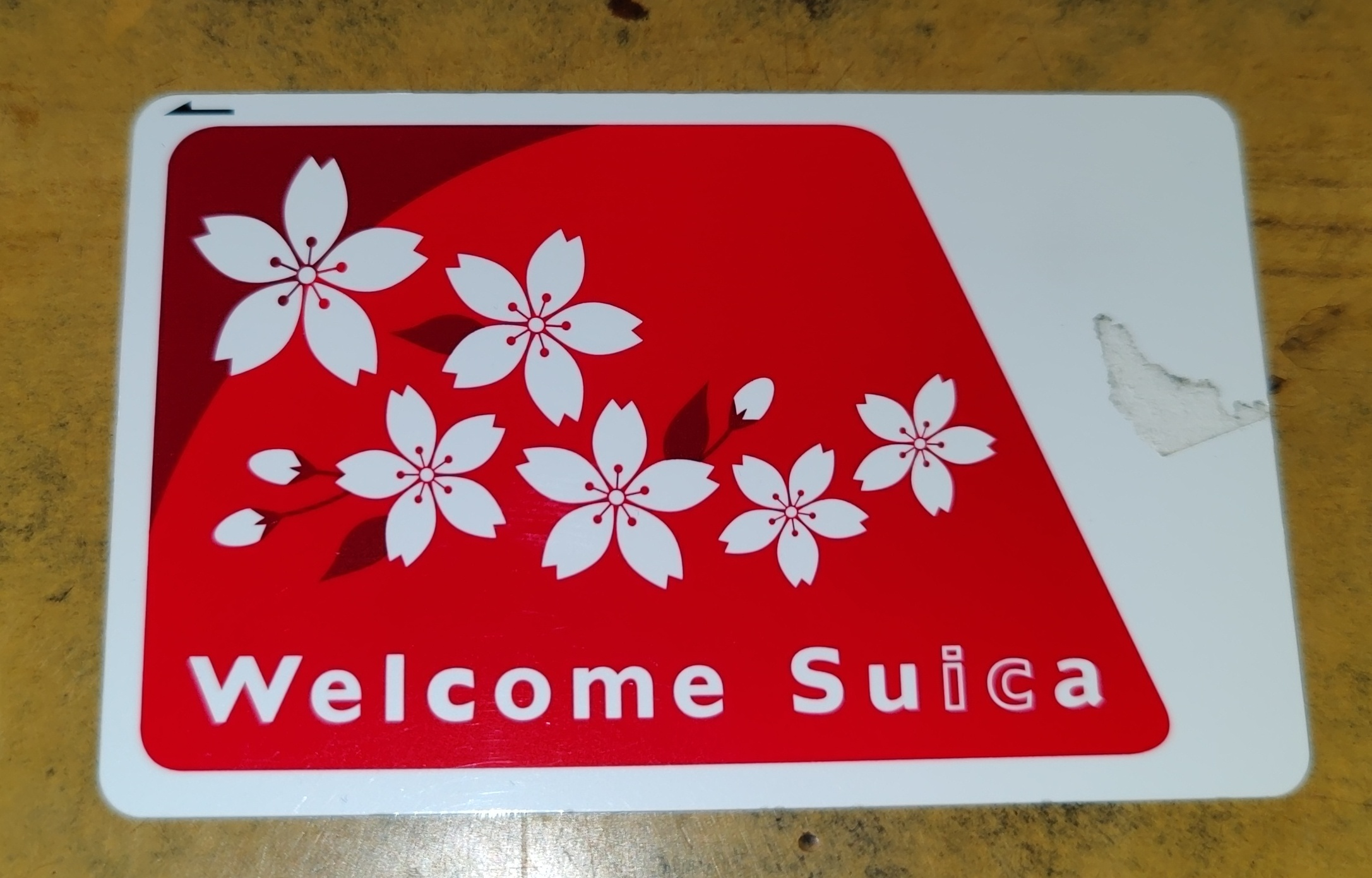
A Welcome Suica, intended for use by inbound tourists

In August 2019, JR East unveiled Welcome Suica, a Suica variant designed to be used by international tourists visiting Japan. The card's design features white cherry blossoms on a red background. Welcome Suica is also reloadable but, unlike regular Suica cards, Welcome Suica does not require the user to make a deposit. However, Welcome Suica can only be used for 28 days from the date of purchase after which it expires permanently. It is also nonrefundable, regardless of the balance or user's activity. Child versions are also available. The Welcome Suica app for foreign visitors was released in March 2025.

JR East request customers using the card carry with them a reference sheet, printed at the time of purchase.

== Card stacking ==
Ticket gates return an error when the scan encounters more than one compatible card. Although it is intended that each person have only one Suica, many people have more than one, or may carry other IC cards as well. Consequently, JR East began an awareness campaign in March 2007 to discourage commuters from storing multiple cards together. Incompatible cards, such as Edy, seem to have an inconsistent effect on a machine's ability to read the card which may depend on the reading device. On the other hand, the Express-IC (EX-IC) card for Tokaido Shinkansen reservations is meant to be used in this manner (stacked on top of an IC card to facilitate transfer between Shinkansen and regular lines).

== Technology ==
The card incorporates a contactless Near Field Communication (NFC) technology developed by Sony called FeliCa. The same technology is also deployed in the Edy electronic cash cards used in Japan, the Octopus card in Hong Kong, and the EZ-Link Card in Singapore.

== Interoperation ==
Interoperation map

On 18 March 2007, the Tokyo-area private railways, bus companies, and subways implemented PASMO, a smart card solution to replace the existing Passnet magnetic card system. Through collaboration with JR East, passengers can use Suica wherever PASMO cards are accepted to ride any railway or bus in the Tokyo metropolitan area. Monthly passes for JR East lines can only be on Suica, while monthly passes for Tokyo Metro can only be on PASMO cards; besides this caveat, the cards are functionally identical for commuters.

This agreement has since been implemented with other systems across Japan, known as the Nationwide Mutual Usage Service. As a result, beginning in 2013, Suica has full interoperability with Kitaca, PASMO, TOICA, manaca, ICOCA, PiTaPa, SUGOCA, nimoca, and Hayakaken IC cards.

On 22 July 2014, Nintendo added support for Suica and PASMO cards in the Nintendo eShop through the NFC function of the Wii U GamePad and the New Nintendo 3DS. The service was discontinued on January 18, 2022.

== Mobile devices ==
=== Mobile Suica ===
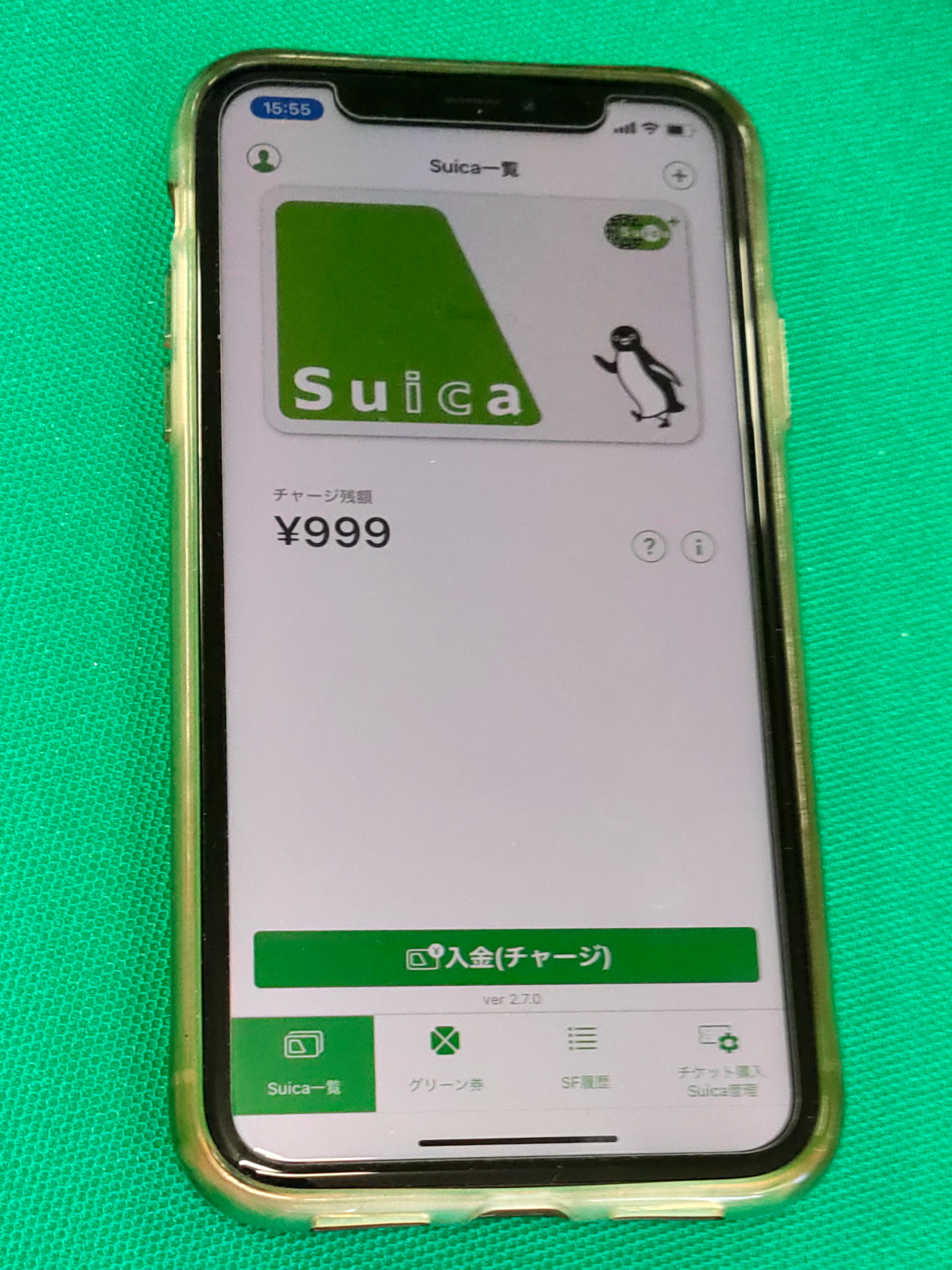
Mobile Suica running on an iPhone

Since January 2006, a version called Mobile Suica (モバイルSuica, Mobairu Suika) was incorporated into mobile FeliCa wallet phones by Japan's mobile operators. This system includes Java applications to manage the Suica function in the mobile phone, to recharge the Suica stored in the mobile phone, review the stored value and perform other functions via the phone. An enhancement for 2007 allowed for Suica charges to be added directly to the phone bill, eliminating the requirement to constantly add to and monitor the remaining balance. On May 23, 2011, JR announced the debut of a Mobile Suica app for Android smartphones supporting Osaifu-Keitai. It was first launched by the carriers NTT DoCoMo and au, and is now also offered by SoftBank Mobile and Willcom.

Since October 2006, it is possible to register for Mobile Suica using any major credit card. A limited e-money-only application called "Easy Mobile Suica" (which does not require a credit card) was also launched in late October 2006.

=== Apple Pay ===
On September 7, 2016, Apple announced that Suica could be added to Apple Pay in the Wallet app and used in the same way as a physical card. This functionality was limited to devices purchased in Japan which included FeliCa support: iPhone 7 (model A1779 and A1785) and Apple Watch Series 2. With the release of the iPhone 8, iPhone X and the Apple Watch Series 3, and later, devices purchased anywhere in the world could be used with Apple Pay Suica.

iOS 13, launched in 2019, introduced support for creating a virtual Suica card from the Wallet app. iOS 15, launched in 2021, introduced new Wallet app improvements and a dedicated category for adding Suica and other transit cards regardless of the device's region setting.

=== Google Wallet ===
On May 24, 2018, Google announced that Suica cards could be added to Google Pay (now Google Wallet). This functionality is limited to Android devices that have their Google Account's region set to Japan and which support Osaifu-Keitai, i.e. the phone must have been purchased in Japan, or be rooted (and have a FeliCa chip, as modern Google Pixel phones do) to enable this feature.

== See also ==
- Mass transit system
- Electronic money
- List of smart cards
