= Google Pay Send =

Mobile payment system developed by Google

- Developer: Google
- Release: May 26, 2011; 15 years ago

Final release(s) [±]
- Android: 22.0.185571266 / February 21, 2018; 8 years ago
- iOS: 21.7.49 / February 26, 2018; 8 years ago
- Platform: Android, iOS, Web platform
- Successor: Google Wallet
- Available in: 6 languages
- List of languages English, French, German, Italian, Portuguese, Spanish
- Website: pay.google.com/send/

Google Pay Send, previously known as Google Wallet, was a peer-to-peer payments service developed by Google before its merger into Google Pay. It allowed people to send and receive money from a mobile device or desktop computer.

In 2018, Android Pay and Google Wallet were unified into a single pay system called Google Pay. The old Wallet app was rebranded Google Pay Send, before it was discontinued as well in 2020.

== Service ==
Google Pay is structured to allow its patrons to send money to each other. To send money, a Google Pay user enters the email address or phone number of the recipient. The recipient must then link that phone number or email address to a bank account in order to access those funds. If the recipient also has a Google Pay account, the funds will post to that account directly.

Users can link up to two bank accounts when the Wallet account is created. Received money goes to the Google Pay Balance and stays there until the user decides to cash out to a linked account.

The Google Pay app is available for free from either Google Play or the App Store. After downloading the app, the user creates a four-digit personal identification number (PIN) for managing everything within their Google Pay account. The PIN verifies access to the Wallet app on the user's mobile device.

Before it was discontinued on June 30, 2016, the Google Wallet Card was recognized by the Cirrus network operated by MasterCard (rather than the Plus network operated by Visa).

In September 2017, Google launched its first major payments service outside the United States, in Tez, India.

== History ==
Google payment apps

2006–2013 Google Checkout
2011–2015 Google Wallet
2015–2018 Android Pay	2015–2018 Google Wallet	2017–2018 Tez
2018–2022 Google Pay	2018–2020 Google Pay Send	2018–2020 Google Pay
2022–present Google Wallet	2020–present Google Pay

See also: Google Pay (payment method)

=== Early history ===
Logo of former Google Wallet brand, used in 2015.

Google demonstrated the original version of the service at a press conference on May 26, 2011. The first app was released in the US only on September 19, 2011. Initially, the app only supported Mastercard cards issued by Citibank.

On May 15, 2013, Google announced the integration of Google Wallet and Gmail, allowing users to send money through Gmail attachments. While Google Wallet is available only in the United States, the Gmail integration is currently available in the U.S. and the United Kingdom.

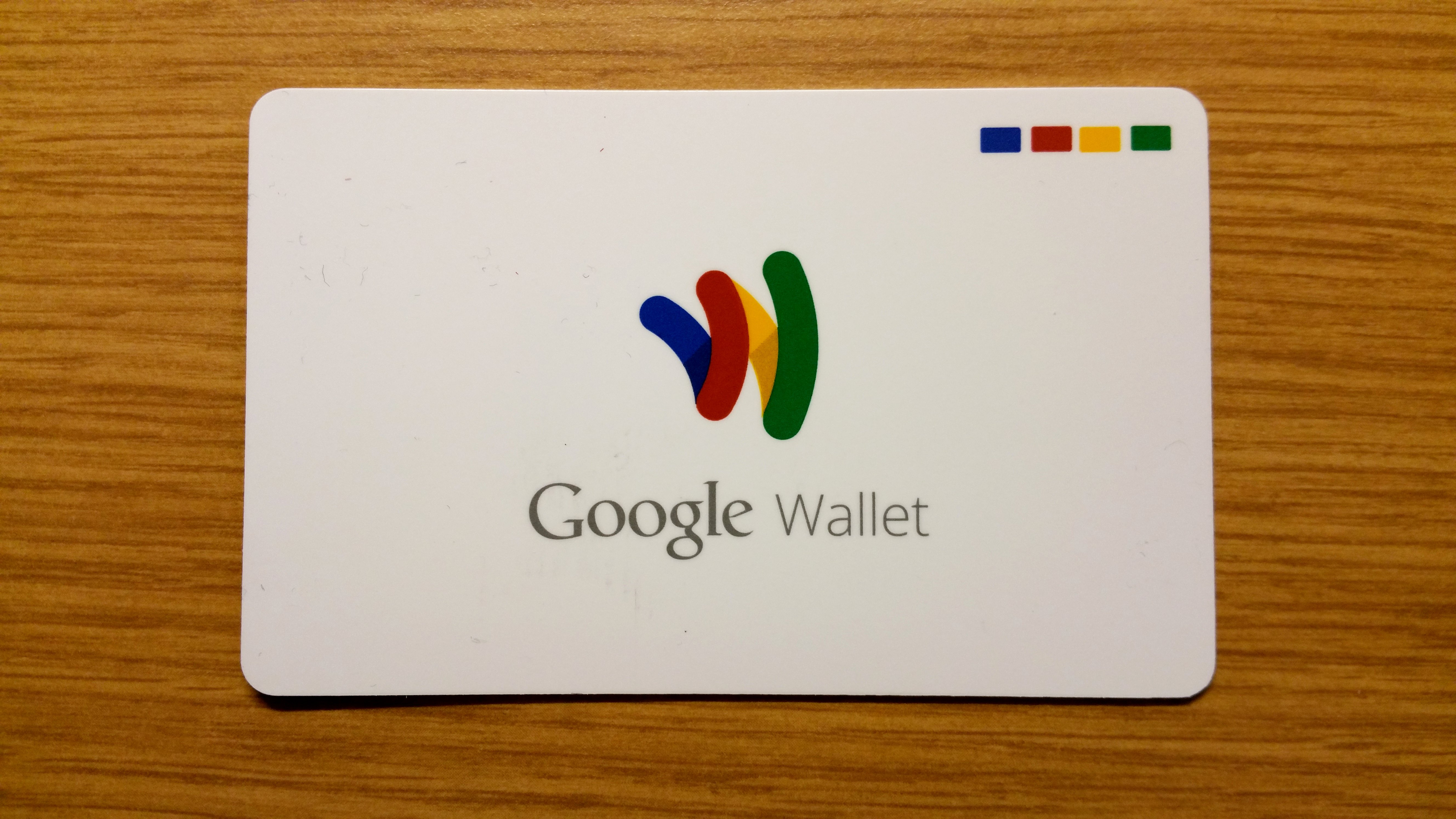
The Google Wallet card before 2015

The physical Google Wallet Card was an optional addition to the app which allowed users to make purchases at point-of-sale (in stores or online) drawing from funds in their Google Wallet account, attached debit card account, or bank account. The card could also be used to withdraw cash at ATMs with no Google-associated fee, and could be used like a debit card for virtually any purpose, including such things as renting a car. The Wallet Card was discontinued on June 30, 2016, and replaced with Android Pay.

The original version of Google Wallet allowed users to make point-of-sale purchases with their mobile devices using near-field communication (NFC) technology. As of September 2015, however, Google dropped NFC from Google Wallet, offering the technology only through Android Pay, which is a separate application available only to Android users. As a result, any gift cards, loyalty programs, and promotional offers stored in an older version of Google Wallet could no longer be used. For Android users, those outstanding offers and gift cards were automatically transferred to Android Pay. For iOS users, instructions were provided to export the offers for alternative use. There were no reported security problems with the NFC technology.

=== Distinction from Android Pay ===
On February 23, 2015, Google announced that it would acquire the intellectual property of the carrier-backed competitor Softcard and integrate it into Google Wallet, and that American mobile network operators AT&T Mobility, T-Mobile US, and Verizon Wireless would bundle the Google Wallet app on their compatible devices. The effective merger resulted in the new service known as Android Pay, a competitor to Apple Pay and similar NFC mobile payment service.

Separate from Android Pay, Google Wallet now allows peer-to-peer transactions for cases such as when people want to split the cost of shared expenses, reimburse each other, keep track of joint spending, or give money as a gift or loan.

While Android Pay is only available to Android users, Google Wallet is available on iOS and via Gmail as well. For those using Android, the two products together (Android Pay and Google Wallet) offer a comprehensive payments management system, a “tool for staying in charge of the bank account.” Users can link their bank accounts or debit cards to Android Pay and to their Google Wallet app. With this approach, users can manage their money from one source, with the ability to:

- Pay at point-of-sale by tapping their phone (via Android Pay)
- Send and receive money to other individuals for free (via the Google Wallet app)
- Keep track of spending (through the optional Google Wallet Card)

== Business model ==
Google does not charge users for access to Google Wallet. Sending and receiving money is free, as is adding money to a Wallet Card through a linked bank account. There are limits on how much money users can add to their Wallet Balance, withdraw from the linked account or card, or send and receive to other individuals. These limits are set per transaction and within certain time periods. Previously, a 2.9% fee applied to funds added via debit card, although Google dropped that ability as of May 2, 2016.

Funds sent from a Wallet balance, debit card, or linked bank account are generally available to the recipient immediately, and if the recipient has his or her own Wallet account and card, he or she can make an immediate withdrawal of those funds from an ATM. If the funds are drawn on the sender's Wallet balance, the balance will also reflect this change immediately. Any portion of funds drawn via a linked bank account will take two or three days to actually post to that account, though these funds will show as "pending" withdrawals on that account within 24 hours.

While Google does not have revenue coming in from the Wallet ecosystem (the web service, app, and the Wallet Card), the product is part of a larger suite of e-commerce products, including Android Pay, which integrates loyalty programs and promotions from other businesses.

== Security ==
Google Wallet protects payment credentials by storing user data on secure servers and encrypting all payment information with industry-standard SSL (secure socket layer) technology. Full credit and debit card information is never shown in the app. All Google Wallet users are also required to have a PIN to protect access to their Wallet account. The payments PIN is used for:

- Gaining access to the Google Wallet app on a mobile device
- Making point-of-sale purchases with a Google Wallet Card
- Withdrawing cash with a Google Wallet Card at an ATM

Google also recommends having a general passcode on mobile devices for additional security.

In some cases, users have to verify their identity in order to make certain transactions. If prompted to do so, the user will visit the Wallet website and follow steps to ensure their accurate identity. This is in adherence with US Federal Deposit Insurance Corporation financial regulations that require payment providers to ensure customer identity.

If a Google Wallet Card is lost or stolen, users can immediately cancel access to it by signing into myaccount.google.com. Google also offers the additional flexibility of temporarily locking the card if a user suspects that the card has simply been misplaced. In the event of unauthorized transactions, Google Wallet Fraud Protection covers 100% of verified unauthorized transactions made in the US reported within 120 days of the transaction. Only US residents who have Wallet accounts associated with a US address are eligible for coverage under this policy.

=== Criticism ===
Regarding an earlier version of Google Wallet (in 2012), an analysis by security company Nowsecure revealed that some card information stored by Google Wallet was accessible outside of the application. It is suggested that hackers could create a way to intercept data by eavesdropping on Google Analytics, which monitors apps used on the Android OS. A previous analysis by the same firm revealed a number of other exploits that have since been fixed.

== Privacy ==
Privacy concerns include the storing of data regarding payment information, transaction details, payment attempts and other information stored by Google indefinitely. The privacy policy for Google Wallet, called the Google Payments Privacy Notice, indicates that much of the data is stored but may not be shared outside Google except under certain circumstances. Information that may be collected upon signing up includes credit or debit card number and expiration date, address, phone number, date of birth, social security number, or taxpayer ID number. Information that may be collected about a transaction made through Google Wallet includes date, time, and amount of transaction, merchant's location and description, a description of goods or services purchased, any photo the user associates with the transaction, the names and email addresses of sender and recipient, the type of payment method used, and a description of the reason for the transaction if included.

The storage of such personal information about users' transactions is of significant financial value to a company that earns much of its revenue from data, but may be controversial to users aware of the policies. Information collected is shared with Google's affiliates, meaning other companies owned and controlled by Google Inc., which can be used for their everyday business purposes. They provide the option to opt out of certain sharing capacities with these affiliates. Google states that it will only share personal information with other companies or individuals outside of Google in the following circumstances:

- As permitted under the Google Privacy Policy
- As necessary to process your transaction and maintain your account
- To complete your registration for a service provided by a third party

== PayPal lawsuit ==
Shortly after the launch of Google Wallet's first iteration in 2011, PayPal filed a lawsuit against Google and two former employees of PayPal – Osama Bedier and Stephanie Tilenius. The complaint alleged "misappropriation of trade secrets" and "breach of fiduciary duty". The lawsuit revealed that Google had been negotiating with PayPal for two years to power payments on mobile devices. But just as the deal was about to be signed, Google backed off and instead hired the PayPal executive negotiating the deal, Bedier. The lawsuit noted that Bedier knew all of PayPal's future plans for mobile payments, as well as an internal detailed analysis of Google's weaknesses in the area. Not only that, it accused him of storing "confidential information in locations such as his non-PayPal computers, non-PayPal e-mail account, and an account on the remote computing service called 'Dropbox'."

Google ran a competitor to PayPal, Google Checkout, from 2006 to 2013. In 2011, Google Wallet replaced Checkout's services, and development on Checkout was discontinued in 2013.

== See also ==
- Apple Pay
- Apple Wallet
- LG Pay
- Microsoft Pay
- Samsung Pay
- Square cash
- Venmo
