= Wallet (disambiguation) =

A wallet is a small, flat case that can be used to carry personal items.

Wallet or The Wallet may also refer to:

== Arts, entertainment, and media ==
=== Literature ===
- "Al-Mahfaza" ("The Wallet"), a story by Yusuf Idris
- The Wallet of Kai Lung, a collection of fantasy stories by Ernest Bramah 1900
- The Wallet of Time, a publication by William Winter, in two volumes 1913

=== Motion pictures ===
- The Wallet (film), British film 1952, released as Blueprint for Danger in the US
- "The Wallet" (Seinfeld)
- "The Wallet", an episode of the Maude TV series, 1974

=== Music ===
- "Wallet", by Plaid from Reachy Prints
- "Wallet", a song by Regina Spektor from Far
- The Wallets, a band from the Twin Cities 1980s

== Electronic commerce ==
- Apple Wallet, a mobile app included with the Apple iOS operating system
- Cryptocurrency wallet, a digital wallet where private keys are stored for cryptocurrencies like Bitcoin
- Digital wallet, an electronic device or online service that allows an individual to make electronic or online payment transactions
- Google Wallet, a peer-to-peer payments service developed by Google
- Microsoft Wallet, a mobile payment and digital wallet service by Microsoft
- Online wallet, an online service that allows an individual to make online payment transactions
- Samsung Wallet, a digital wallet platform developed by Samsung

== See also ==
- Wallet sciatica
- Wallet (surname)
