= Google Wallet =

Digital wallet platform by Google

- Developer: Google
- Release: 18 July 2022; 4 years ago

Stable release(s) [±]
- Android: 26.45 / November 17, 2026; 2 days ago
- Wear OS: 26.41 / October 31, 2026; 19 days ago
- iOS: 26.45 / November 17, 2026; 2 days ago
- Operating system: Android 9+; Wear OS 2.18+; Fitbit OS; iOS 17+; Discontinued: Android 7, 8 (2024); Android 5, 6 (2022)
- Predecessor: Google Pay Send; Google Pay (U.S.)
- Service name: Google Wallet (Wallet for short)
- Type: Digital wallet app
- Website: wallet.google

Google Wallet (or simply Wallet) is a digital wallet platform developed by Google. It is available for the Android, Wear OS, Fitbit OS, and iOS operating systems, and was announced on May 11, 2022, at the 2022 Google I/O keynote. It began rolling out on Android smartphones on July 18, 2022, and iOS followed on November 17, 2026, though with much more limited functionality.

== History ==
Google payment apps

2006–2013 Google Checkout
2011–2015 Google Wallet
2015–2018 Android Pay	2015–2018 Google Wallet	2017–2018 Tez
2018–2022 Google Pay	2018–2020 Google Pay Send	2018–2020 Google Pay
2022–present Google Wallet	2020–present Google Pay

See also: Google Pay (payment method)

The "Google Wallet" brand name was first used for the company's mobile payment system of the same name, which was introduced in 2011 before being merged with Android Pay into a new app called Google Pay in 2018. The old Wallet app, with its functionality reduced to a peer-to-peer payments service, was rebranded Google Pay Send before it was discontinued as well in 2020. In 2020, the Google Pay app underwent an extensive redesign based on Google's India-focused Tez app, expanding into an all-encompassing personal finance app. This replaced the Tez app on the Play Store, while the 2018 Google Pay app continued to co-exist as a separate, pre-installed app on Android smartphones.

=== Google Wallet (2011) launches ===
Google demonstrated the original version of the original Google Wallet app at a press conference on May 26, 2011. The first app was released in the US only on September 19, 2011. Initially, the app only supported Mastercard cards issued by Citibank.

On May 15, 2013, Google announced the integration of Google Wallet and Gmail, allowing users to send money through Gmail attachments. While Google Wallet was available only in the United States, the Gmail integration was made available in the U.S. and the United Kingdom.

In 2015, a physical Google Wallet card was launched as an optional addition to the app, which allowed users to make purchases at point-of-sale (in stores or online) drawing from funds in their Google Wallet account, attached debit card account, or bank account. The card could also be used to withdraw cash at ATMs with no Google-associated fee, and could be used like a debit card for virtually any purpose, including such things as renting a car. The Wallet Card was discontinued on June 30, 2016, and replaced with Android Pay.

=== Android Pay launches ===
Originally launched as Android Pay, the service was released at Google I/O 2015. Android Pay was a successor to and built on the base established by Google Wallet which was released in 2011. It also used technology from the carrier-backed Softcard—Google had acquired its intellectual property in February 2015. At launch, the service was compatible with 70% of Android devices and was accepted at over 700,000 merchants. The old Google Wallet still powered web-based Play Store purchases and some app-based peer-to-peer payments.

The logo of the former branding of the service, Android Pay

In 2016, Google began a public trial in Silicon Valley of a related mobile app called Hands Free. In this system, the customer does not need to present a phone or card. Instead, a customer announces that they wish to "pay with Google" and give their initials to the cashier, who verifies their identity with a photo previously uploaded to the system. The customer's phone will only authorize payment if its geographic location system indicates that it is near a participating store.

On September 18, 2017, Google launched a payments app in India known as Tez, utilizing the Unified Payments Interface (UPI). On August 28, 2018, Google rebranded Tez to Google Pay.

=== Android Pay and Google Wallet become Google Pay ===
Google Pay acceptance mark

On January 8, 2018, Google announced that Google Wallet would be merged into Android Pay, with the service as a whole rebranded as Google Pay. This merger extends the platform into web-based payments integrated into other Google and third-party services. It also took over the branding of Google Chrome's autofill feature. Google Pay adopts the features of both Android Pay and Google Wallet through its in-store, peer-to-peer, and online payments services.

The rebranding began to roll out as an update to the Android Pay app on February 20, 2018; the app was given an updated design and now displays a personalized list of nearby stores that support Google Pay. The rebranded service provided a new API that allows merchants to add the payment service to websites, apps, Stripe, Braintree, and Google Assistant. The service allows users to use the payment cards they have on file in their Google Account.

=== Google Pay becomes Google Wallet (2022) ===
In January 2022, Bloomberg News reported that the company was planning to transform Google Pay into a "comprehensive digital wallet", following the app's reported slow growth and the shutdown of Plex. In April, it was reported that Google was planning to revive the "Google Wallet" branding in a new app or interface, and integrated with Google Pay. Google officially announced Google Wallet on May 11, 2022, at the 2022 Google I/O keynote. The app began rolling out on Android smartphones on July 18, replacing the 2018 app and co-existing with the 2020 Google Pay app in the U.S. While the app name itself was changed from Google Pay to Google Wallet, the service name of actually paying for things online or in-store remains as "Google Pay."

=== International deployment ===
In its UK launch, Android Pay supported Mastercard, Visa, and debit cards from many of the UK's major financial institutions – including Bank of Scotland, First Direct, Halifax, HSBC, Lloyds Bank, M&S Bank, MBNA and Nationwide Building Society – "with new banks being added all the time", according to Google. NatWest, RBS and Ulster Bank launched on September 14, 2016. On September 8, 2016, it was reported that UK banks TSB and Santander would be participating in the following weeks. Android Pay was launched in Singapore on June 28, 2016 and in Australia on July 14, 2016.

Android Pay launched in Ireland on December 7, 2016, and was initially available to customers of AIB and KBC, having since been extended to Bank of Ireland and Ulster Bank. The service works with both credit and debit cards.

On December 21, 2018, Google Payment obtained an e-money license in Lithuania – the license will enable Google to process payments, issue e-money, and handle electronic money wallets in the EU.

On November 17, 2020, Google Pay was enabled by Mastercard in ten new European countries: Austria, Bulgaria, Estonia, Greece, Hungary, Latvia, Lithuania, Netherlands, Portugal, and Romania. Cardholders of participating Mastercard partner banks for these countries will be able to use the Google Pay service through their respective mobile banking apps.

On June 30, 2022, it was announced at the Google for Mexico event that payment method Google Pay & the Google Wallet app would soon be available in Mexico. Google Wallet was introduced in India on 8 May 2024, albeit it will function in tandem with Google Pay mobile app, the main payment solution in the market.

== Features ==
Google Wallet allows users to store items such as payment cards for use via Google Pay, as well as passes such as loyalty cards, digital keys, digital identification cards, transit passes, event tickets, and health passes.

Primary car keys in Google Wallet on either Wear OS or Android can still be utilized when the screen is off or the battery is depleted.

Although the Wear OS and Android versions of Wallet are currently fragmented, Google has stated that its "long-term goal is for feature parity on your watch and phone," though as of 2026, new features and card schemes continue to be launched without parity on all platforms. At Google I/O 2024, Google announced that "expanded support for passes of all types" would be coming to Wear OS and Fitbit OS.

=== Comparison between phone and wearable versions ===
Feature	Android	Wear OS	Fitbit OS	iOS	Notes
Pay with EMV payment cards via Google Pay	Yes	Partial	Partial	No	Some payment cards are not supported on Wear OS or Fitbit OS.
Pay with FeliCa payment cards via Google Pay	Yes	Yes	No	No	For Wear OS: Only for Pixel Watches, Galaxy Watch Ultra, and Galaxy Watch6 or later devices purchased in Japan.
Pay via QR code	Yes	No	No	No	For Android: Only available in Brazil.
Store passes	Yes	Partial	Coming soon	Partial	For Wear OS & iOS: Private passes are not supported. Smart Tap (NFC) passes only show their fallback QR code/barcode/number.
Store campus identifications	Yes	No	No	No	
Store corporate badges	Yes	Partial	Coming soon	No	
Store government-issued identifications	Yes	No	No	No	
Store hotel keys	Yes	Yes	No	No	
Store home keys	Yes	No	No	No	
Store car keys	Yes	Partial	No	No	For Android: Only for select devices, most notably Pixel Fold, Pixel 6, & Pixel 6a or later devices. For Wear OS: Only for Pixel Watch 3 or later.
Store MIFARE/Calypso/ITSO/EMV transit cards	Yes	Partial	Partial	No	For Android: iPASS can only be stored on select devices. For Wear OS: Only SmarTrip, Clipper, ORCA, PRESTO, Breeze, myki, and Sofia City are supported. For Fitbit OS: iPASS can only be stored on select devices.
Store FeliCa transit cards	Yes	Partial	Partial	No	For Android: Only for supported devices purchased in Japan. For Wear OS: Only for Pixel Watches, Galaxy Watch6 or later, and Galaxy Watch Ultra devices purchased in Japan. For Fitbit OS: Suica cards can be stored through Fitbit Wallet instead (Fitbit account region must be set to Japan.)
Store FeliCa e-money cards	Yes	No	No	No	For Android: Only for supported devices purchased in Japan.
Store transit loyalty cards	Yes	No	No	No	

=== Usage ===
Passes and cards stored in Wallet require varying levels of authentication in order to convey to a reader.

Feature	Android	Wear OS	Fitbit OS
Pay with EMV payment cards via Google Pay	Phone on, phone unlocked. To pay with non-default, Wallet app must be open to desired card.	Watch on, watch unlocked. To pay with non-default, Wallet app must be open to desired card. (Pixel Watch 2 or later). For other devices, Wallet app must be open for any card.	Watch on, watch unlocked, Wallet app open.
Pay with FeliCa payment cards via Google Pay	Phone on, phone unlocked to pay with default iD/QUICPay card. To pay with non-default, Wallet app must be open to the desired card.	Watch on, watch unlocked to pay with default iD/QUICPay card. To pay with non-default, Wallet app must be open to desired card.	—N/a
Pay via QR code	Phone on, phone unlocked, Wallet app open & ready to scan QR.	—N/a	—N/a
Use code-based or visual passes (excluding visual transit passes)	Phone on, phone unlocked, Wallet app open & viewing desired pass.	Watch on, watch unlocked, Wallet app open & viewing desired pass.	—N/a
Use general NFC (Smart Tap) passes	Phone on, phone screen lit. Some Pixel devices will wake their own screen when presented to an NFC reader.	—N/a	—N/a
Use private passes	Phone on, phone unlocked, Wallet app open, authenticate additional time.	—N/a	—N/a
Use government-issued identifications	Phone on, phone unlocked, verify shared info. Additional step of opening the Wallet app is required if scanning 2D code instead of NFC.	—N/a	—N/a
Use car keys	Phone can be on or off for use via NFC. For UWB, phone must be on.	Watch can be on and unlocked or manually powered off after having been unlocked for use via NFC. For UWB, watch must be on and unlocked.	—N/a
Use home keys	Phone must be on for use via either NFC or UWB.		
Pay with EMV payment cards on transit	Phone on. To pay with non-default, phone must be unlocked and Wallet app must be open to desired card.	Watch on, watch unlocked. To pay with non-default, Wallet app must be open to desired card.	
Use MIFARE/Calypso/ITSO/EMV transit cards	Phone on, phone screen lit (unless card supports express transit.) Some Pixel devices will wake their own screen when presented to an NFC reader.**	Watch on, watch unlocked.*	Watch can be on or off, depending on device.^
Use FeliCa transit cards	Phone can be on or off.	Watch on, watch unlocked.	—N/a
Use transit loyalty cards	Phone on, phone screen lit. Some Pixel devices will wake their own screen when presented to an NFC reader.	—N/a	—N/a

* = except Clipper & myki; Wallet app must be open in those cases

** = except iPASS; phone can be off in that case

^ = iPASS only

=== Pass transfers ===
When switching devices or factory resetting, passes that are limited to one device have the potential to be lost, as Android/Wear OS does not automatically remove data from Wallet when the aforementioned processes are initiated. The user must remember to clear device-specific passes, such as transit cards, IDs, and keys from their current devices.

== Ecosystem ==
"Add to Google Wallet" badge

Google Wallet has a passes feature, which exists in a larger ecosystem. They are presented below the user's payment cards and can be sorted manually. Users can either create their own, although they'll have limited functionality. Or developers can create them, though they must first be granted access to the Google Wallet API before they can author such items. Passes can be shared to other users via a link, so long as the issuer of said pass does not restrict its addition to more than one user's Wallet.

In its simplest form, an interaction (or transaction) between a pass and a system is facilitated by a 1D or 2D code, although it requires the customer to initiate the activity. Passes can also contain nothing but plain text or an image.

In addition to retailer-specific passes, Google Wallet also supports contactless student IDs that can be added through the Transact eAccounts and CBORD GET Mobile applications. Government-issued IDs are also supported in eleven American states/territories.

=== Smart Tap ===
Google Wallet offers Smart Tap technology for use by developers and merchants that enables NFC passes to be stored within a customer's Google Wallet for use at a compatible terminal. Google offers the technology free of charge through the Google Pay & Wallet Console. Each pass issuer is given a Collector ID to use to configure their compatible terminals. If multiple passes within a user's Wallet match a terminal's Collector ID, a carousel will appear when tapping, allowing the user to tap their device, swipe to the next pass, and then repeat the process until all desired passes are transmitted.

This technology is currently used by a variety of businesses and governments worldwide for a wide range of uses. Walt Disney World Resort (USA), Ticketmaster (USA & UK), and Pathé Cinémas (France) use it for ticketing. Nando's (UK & Ireland) and Woolworth's (Australia) use it for loyalty programs. The city of Reykjavik utilizes it for their digital Reykjavíkurkortið pass, which can be used to access a variety of municipal services. And Anytime Fitness (Globally), Keepcool (France), Club Lime (Australia), & David Lloyd Clubs (UK) use it for memberships.

== Financial services ==
=== Google Pay ===
Google Pay is a service within Wallet that allows for payments with select banks and card networks. Currently available in a subset of the countries that support Google Wallet.

=== QR Payments ===
Wallet allows for QR payments in Brazil. This service supports the Visa, Mastercard, and Elo networks, as well as via Pix, and is primarily intended for users that do not have NFC functionality in their Android-powered devices.

== Availability ==
=== Unsupported countries ===
As of October 2026, Google Wallet is available nearly globally, with the exceptions of:

- Algeria
- Angola
- Belarus
- China
- Cuba
- Iran
- Libya
- Myanmar
- North Korea
- Russia
- South Korea
- South Sudan
- Sudan
- Syria
- Turkey

==== Region locking ====
Google Wallet prohibits FeliCa-based payment, transit, and loyalty functionality (e.g. Suica, PASMO, WAON, etc.) from being accessed on non-Japanese devices by restricting the initialization of the required third-party Osaifu-Keitai middleware apps on both Android & Wear OS. However, users have discovered ways to enable the functionality on non-Japanese models of Pixels via rooting. This behavior is in contrast to other wallets such as Apple Wallet, which allow users with any regional device model (iPhone 7 or later) to add FeliCa-based cards.

In turn, users with Japanese devices cannot access North American & European transit cards such as SmarTrip and Pop, though there is a workaround via previewing a route in Google Maps that uses the desired fare payment method, and selecting the banner that offers to add said card to Wallet.

Campus IDs are also claimed to be locked to devices bought in the United States of America, Canada, and Australia. Though this seems to be inaccurate, considering campus IDs have since made an appearance in Italy. Google claims support for international devices is "coming soon," though this has been promised for several years as of 2026.

In addition, UWB functionality for car keys and home keys is limited to regions that allow the frequency to be broadcast in personal mobile devices by law.

=== Supported loyalty programs ===
These programs are conveyed through NFC through Google Wallet's Smart Tap feature. Some of these can be added through the Google Wallet app directly, while others must be added through the respective retailer's app or website. Programs that support One Tap are conveyed at the same time as a payment card stored in Google Wallet. Conversely, Two Tap programs are redeemed in a sequential manner, where a loyalty pass is scanned first, and then payment can be presented.

Country	Retailer	One Tap/Two Tap
Australia	Dan Murphy's My Dan's	
Australia	Woolworths' Everyday Rewards	Two Tap
Ireland	Nando's Nando Card	Two Tap
Japan	d Point	Two Tap
Japan	Rakuten Point Card	Two Tap
New Zealand	Woolworths' Everyday Rewards	Two Tap
Taiwan	OPEN POINT	One Tap
United Kingdom	Texaco's Star Rewards	Two Tap
United Kingdom	Valero's SaveUP Rewards	
United States	Coca-Cola's Vending Pass	One Tap
United States	Dave & Buster's Power Card	One Tap
United States	Jimmy John's Freaky Fast Rewards	One Tap
United States	Yogurtland's Real Rewards	One Tap

=== Supported public transport systems ===
Due to the open nature of the Android platform, some transit cards are only available through other Android-based mobile wallets or via their own apps (e.g. TAP for Android). Transit cards that support direct provisioning can be issued within the Google Wallet app itself, without needing to access a separate third party application or website. Some public transport systems listed here support skipping verification with Google Pay on Android and Wear OS, wherein the only requirement for transmitting a payment or transit card is for the device to be on (for phones), or further have the device unlocked (for watches.) This is not supported on Google Wallet for Fitbit OS, however. Users with Fitbit watches must open the Wallet app time each time they scan their fare payment method (except FeliCa-based fare methods).

All FeliCa-based cards require separate middleware apps to be used and managed by Wallet. Suica and PASMO require the Osaifu-Keitai app, and Octopus requires the Octopus app. All these cards are region-locked and cannot be added by foreign tourists.

Transit Insight cards are passes that can be linked to one payment card in a user's Wallet. Similarly to a transit card, it will keep track of rides made on the system and offer fare caps. However, there is no standalone balance. All funds are pulled directly from the linked payment card.

Country	Area	Skip verification	Direct provisioning	Wear OS support	Required Middleware	Fare Payment Method(s)
Australia	Queensland		—N/a	—N/a	—N/a	Payment cards
Australia	Sydney	Yes	—N/a	—N/a	—N/a	Payment cards
Australia	Victoria	Yes	Yes	Partial**	—N/a	Myki*
Brazil	Rio de Janeiro (only MetrôRio)		—N/a	—N/a	—N/a	Payment cards
Brazil	São Paulo (only SPTrans)		—N/a	—N/a	—N/a	Payment cards
Bulgaria	Sofia	Yes	Yes	Partial**	—N/a	Sofia City Card
Canada	Ontario (TTC, GO Transit, Brampton Transit, MiWay, Oakville Transit and UP Express.)	Yes	Yes	Yes	—N/a	PRESTO
Canada	Ontario (TTC, GO Transit, Brampton Transit, MiWay, Oakville Transit and UP Express.)		—N/a	—N/a	—N/a	Payment cards- VISA, Mastercard and American Express accepted. UP Express also accepts Interac debit cards.
Canada	Vancouver		—N/a	—N/a	—N/a	Payment cards
France	Paris	Yes	Yes	No	—N/a	Navigo
Greece	Athens	Yes	—N/a	—N/a	—N/a	Payment cards- VISA and Mastercard accepted.
Hong Kong	Countrywide	Yes	No	No	Octopus app	Octopus
Japan	Countrywide	Yes	Yes	Yes	Osaifu-Keitai app	Suica
Japan	Countrywide	Yes	Yes	Yes	Osaifu-Keitai app	PASMO
Mexico	CDMX (only Mexico City Metrobús and Mexico City Metro)		—N/a	—N/a	—N/a	Payment cards
Singapore	Countrywide	Yes	—N/a	—N/a	—N/a	Payment cards
Slovakia	Countrywide	Yes	No	No	—N/a	Ubian
Spain	Madrid	Yes	No	No	—N/a	Tarjeta Transporte Público
Taiwan	Countrywide	Yes	Yes	No	—N/a	iPASS
Taiwan	Kaohsiung	No	—N/a	Yes	—N/a	Payment cards- VISA and Mastercard accepted.
Taiwan	New Taipei Metro	No	—N/a	Yes	—N/a	Payment cards- Mastercard are accepted by Ankeng and Danhai light rail.
Taiwan	Taichung MRT	No	—N/a	Yes	—N/a	Payment cards- VISA accepted.
Taiwan	Taoyuan Airport MRT	No	—N/a	Yes	—N/a	Payment cards- VISA and Mastercard accepted.
Ukraine	Kyiv		—N/a	—N/a	—N/a	Payment cards
United Kingdom	Brighton and Hove	Yes		No	—N/a	Transit loyalty card connected to payment card
United Kingdom	Edinburgh	Yes	—N/a	—N/a	—N/a	Payment cards
United Kingdom	London	Yes	—N/a	—N/a	—N/a	Payment cards
United Kingdom	Manchester	Yes	—N/a	—N/a	—N/a	Payment cards
United Kingdom	Tyne and Wear	Yes	Yes	No	—N/a	Pop
United Kingdom	West Midlands	Yes	No	No	—N/a	Swift
United States	Atlanta	Yes	Yes	Yes	—N/a	Breeze, payment cards
United States	Chicago	Yes	No	No	—N/a	Ventra
United States	Chicago	Yes	—N/a	—N/a	—N/a	Payment cards
United States	Dallas	Yes	—N/a	—N/a	—N/a	Payment cards
United States	Las Vegas	Yes	No	No	—N/a	Contactless ticket
United States	Los Angeles	Yes	—N/a	—N/a	—N/a	Payment cards
United States	Miami	Yes	—N/a	—N/a	—N/a	Payment cards
United States	Monterey	Yes		No	—N/a	Transit loyalty card connected to payment card
United States	New York City	Yes	—N/a	—N/a	—N/a	Payment cards
United States	Portland, Oregon	Yes	No	No	—N/a	Hop Fastpass
United States	Portland, Oregon	Yes	—N/a	—N/a	—N/a	Payment cards
United States	San Francisco	Yes	Yes	Yes	—N/a	Clipper*, payment cards (BART only)
United States	Seattle	Yes	Yes	Yes	—N/a	ORCA
United States	Washington, D.C.	Yes	Yes	Yes	—N/a	SmarTrip, payment cards

* = Card cannot be used without opening Wallet beforehand on Wear OS.

** = Card can be transferred from Wallet on Android to Wallet on Wear OS, but cannot be directly provisioned onto the platform; nor can the card's balance be reloaded while it's on Wear OS.

==== Upcoming ====
Country	Area	Wear OS support	Stored via	Fare Payment Method(s)
Mexico	Jalisco	Unknown	Unknown	Mi Movilidad
Philippines	Metro Manila	Unknown	Unknown	Beep
United Arab Emirates	Dubai	Unknown	Unknown	nol
United States	Boston	Unknown	Unknown	Charlie Card
United States	Los Angeles	Unknown	Unknown	TAP
United States	Philadelphia	Unknown	Unknown	SEPTA Key
United States	Washington, D.C.	Unknown	Host Card Emulation	Kids Ride Free SmarTrip

=== Supported digital keys ===
These home locks, vehicle models, hotel rooms, and more can be unlocked via NFC. Car keys in particular require select devices running Android 12/Wear OS 5 or later, most notably the Pixel 6 or later. In addition, car models that support operation via UWB (AKA "passive entry") require an UWB compatible device, such as the Pixel Fold, Pro models of Pixel 6 and later devices, or Pixel Watch 3 and later, for enhanced functionality. Home keys that feature ultra-wideband are limited to an even narrower selection of devices.

=== Supported government-issued identifications ===
These territories permit their residents to save their government-issued identification credentials in Google Wallet. Mobile IDs in Google Wallet support three personal identification standards: ISO 18013-5, ISO 23220-4, and NIST 800-63. Users have a choice whether to present their ID via NFC or QR. Once the credential is read, the ID holder must confirm the personal information they wish to share (full name, age, etc.) The transmission to the reader device will be completed over BLE after the presentation is fully verified. Credentials can also be utilized in apps or on the web. All IDs are free except those issued by North Dakota, which costs $5 per ID renewal. Available for devices running Android 9 or later.

Country	Type	State/Territory
India	Aadhaar	Countrywide
Japan	ID	Countrywide
United States	ID	Arizona
United States	ID	Arkansas
United States	ID	California
United States	ID	Colorado
United States	ID	Georgia
United States	ID	Iowa
United States	ID	Maryland
United States	ID	Montana
United States	ID	New Mexico
United States	ID	North Dakota
United States	ID	Ohio
United States	ID	Oklahoma
United States	ID	Puerto Rico

==== Upcoming ====
Country	Type	State/Territory
United States	ID	Illinois
United States	ID	North Carolina
United States	ID	Virginia
United States	ID	West Virginia

==== Other non-government issued identifications ====
These are ID passes issued by Google that utilize information from an individual's government-issued ID, but the digitized pass itself is not considered to be "government-issued." American ID passes are the only such passes currently able to be used in-person, at Transportation Security Administration checkpoints for domestic travel within America.

Country	Type
Austria	Passport
Brazil	Passport
Estonia	Passport
Ireland	Passport
Italy	Passport
Malaysia	Passport
Singapore	Passport
Spain	Passport
Taiwan	Passport
United States	Passport
United Kingdom	Passport
Vietnam	Passport

===== Upcoming =====
Country	Type
France	Passport

===== Upcoming third-party issuers =====
Issuer	Usage
Sparkasse Bank	Proof of Age

=== Device-specific & region-locked features ===
Some features in Wallet are locked to certain devices that have additional hardware or software that aren't included in other Android/Wear OS devices, such as secure elements or licenses for certain region-specific middleware.

==== Car keys ====
Some devices may need Android OS or Play System updates before being compatible. Compatible Pixel Watches must be paired with a compatible Pixel phone to use car keys.

Brand	Model	UWB availability
Google	Pixel 6a	No
Google	Pixel 6	No
Google	Pixel 6 Pro	Yes
Google	Pixel 7a	No
Google	Pixel 7	No
Google	Pixel 7 Pro	Yes
Google	Pixel 8a	No
Google	Pixel 8	No
Google	Pixel 8 Pro	Yes
Google	Pixel Fold	Yes
Google	Pixel 9a	No
Google	Pixel 9	No
Google	Pixel 9 Pro	Yes
Google	Pixel 9 Pro Fold	Yes
Google	Pixel 10a	No
Google	Pixel 10	No
Google	Pixel 10 Pro	Yes
Google	Pixel 10 Pro Fold	Yes
Google	Pixel 11	No
Google	Pixel 11 Pro	Yes
Google	Pixel 11 Pro Fold	Yes
Google	Pixel Watch 3	Yes
Google	Pixel Watch 4	Yes
Google	Pixel Watch 5	Yes
Motorola	Edge 50 Ultra	Yes
Motorola	Razr 50 Ultra	No
Motorola	Razr 60 Ultra	Yes
Motorola	Razr 70 Plus	No
Motorola	Razr 70 Ultra	Yes
Motorola	Razr Fold 2026	Yes
Motorola	Razr Plus 2024	No
Motorola	Razr Plus 2025	No
Motorola	Razr Ultra 2025	Yes
Motorola	Signature	Yes
OnePlus	11	No
OnePlus	Open	No
OnePlus	12	No
OnePlus	13	No
OnePlus	15	No
Oppo	Find N3	No
Oppo	Find N3 Flip	No
Oppo	Find N5	No
Oppo	Find X8	No
Oppo	Find X8 Pro	No
Oppo	Find X9s	No
Oppo	Find X9	No
Oppo	Find X9 Pro	No
Oppo	Find X9 Ultra	No
Xiaomi	12	No
Xiaomi	12 Pro	No
Xiaomi	13	No
Xiaomi	13 Pro	No
Xiaomi	13 Ultra	No
Xiaomi	13T	No
Xiaomi	13T Pro	No
Xiaomi	14	No
Xiaomi	14 Ultra	No
Xiaomi	14T	No
Xiaomi	14T Pro	No
Xiaomi	15	No
Xiaomi	15 Ultra	No
Xiaomi	MIX Flip	Yes
Xiaomi	Poco F7 Ultra	No
Xiaomi	Poco F8 Ultra	No

==== Transit cards ====
Transit card	Requirement(s)
iPASS	Phones: Xiaomi 17T Pro, Xiaomi 17T, Xiaomi 15T Pro, Xiaomi 15T, Xiaomi 14T Pro, Xiaomi 14T, Xiaomi 14 Ultra, Xiaomi 14, Xiaomi Mix Flip POCO F8 Ultra, POCO F8 Pro, POCO F7 Ultra, POCO F7 Pro, POCO F7, POCO X8 Pro Max, POCO X8 Pro, POCO X7 Pro REDMI Note 15 Pro+ 5G vivo X300 Ultra, vivo X300 FE Wearables: Fitbit Sense or later, Fitbit Versa 2 or later (except Lite), Fitbit Charge 4 or later Google Account region must be set to Taiwan
Octopus	Phones: Android 12 or later with NFC Must install Octopus Wallet app (which requires a Hong Kong phone number to sign up for)
PASMO	Phones: Japanese models of select phones Must install Osaifu-Keitai app Wearables: Japanese models of Google Pixel Watch or later Japanese models of Samsung Galaxy Watch6 or later, Galaxy Watch Ultra Google Account region must be set to Japan
Suica	Phones: Japanese models of select phones Must install Osaifu-Keitai app Wearables: Japanese models of Google Pixel Watch or later Japanese models of Samsung Galaxy Watch6 or later, Galaxy Watch Ultra Google Account region must be set to Japan

==== e-Money cards ====
e-Money card	Requirement(s)
Edy	Phones: Japanese models of select phones Must install Osaifu-Keitai app
nanaco	Phones: Japanese models of select phones Must install Osaifu-Keitai app
WAON	Phones: Japanese models of select phones Must install Osaifu-Keitai app

== See also ==
- Apple Wallet
- Samsung Wallet
- Campus card
