= Google Checkout =

2006–2013 online payment processing service by Google

Google Checkout was an online payment processing service provided by Google aimed at simplifying the process of paying for online purchases. The web checkout service was combined with the NFC mobile payments app launched in September of 2011 called Google Wallet under a platform brand of the same name. On November 20, 2013, the web checkout part of the service was fully retired.

Users would store their credit or debit card and shipping information in their Google account, so that they could purchase at participating stores by clicking an on-screen button. Google Checkout provided fraud protection and a unified page for tracking purchases and their status. It is a checkout process that people would integrate into their online shops so that customers can quickly buy things by providing a simple username and password. Then, they could charge the customer's credit card and process their order.

== Merchant Referral Program ==
The Merchant Referral Program was a program where you could earn cash by referring your sellers to use Google Checkout. You would earn $25 for every merchant that processes at least 3 unique customer transactions and $500 in sales by using Checkout.

== History ==
Google payment apps

2006–2013 Google Checkout
2011–2015 Google Wallet
2015–2018 Android Pay	2015–2018 Google Wallet	2017–2018 Tez
2018–2022 Google Pay	2018–2020 Google Pay Send	2018–2020 Google Pay
2022–present Google Wallet	2020–present Google Pay

See also: Google Pay (payment method)

Google Checkout service became available in the United States on June 28, 2006, and in the UK on April 13, 2007. It was free for merchants until February 1, 2008. From then until May 5, 2009 Google charged US merchants 2.0% plus $0.20 per transaction, and UK merchants 1.4% + £0.20. Google subsequently moved to a tiered cost structure, identical to that of PayPal. From that date, Google also discontinued its offer whereby merchants who advertised with an AdWords account were not charged fees on monthly transactions totaling less than ten times their monthly AdWords expenditure.

Google Checkout used to have a program allowing US IRS Certified 501(c)3 Non-Profit organizations to collect donations online without being charged the standard fee (2.9% + $0.30 per transaction under $3,000 monthly income, with lower rates for larger volumes).

In 2006, eBay, which owned PayPal at the time, added Google Checkout to its banned payment methods list, forbidding the use of Google Checkout to pay for eBay transactions. As of June 2011, eBay forbids the use of any external checkout system to pay for eBay transactions.

On November 20, 2013, Google Checkout was discontinued. The company offered a replacement solution for certain payments called Google Wallet.

Google Checkout remains available in the Wayback Machine.

== Support ==
Google Checkout supported customers through multiple channels such as a Help Center, Help Forums, and email support. Google Checkout Buyers could find help at Google Checkout Buyer Help Center and Merchants could find help at Google Checkout Merchant Help Center and Google Checkout Merchant forum. This was subsequently only available for Google Grants recipients, and only through March 31, 2012.

== See also ==
- Amazon Pay
- Electronic bill payment
- Electronic commerce
- Google Wallet
- List of online payment service providers
- Online banking
- PayPal
- Softcard (Isis Mobile Wallet)
