= IPASS (Taiwan) =

Proximity card used in Taiwan

iPASS 一卡通
- Location: Taiwan
- Launched: December 2007; 18 years ago
- Technology: MIFARE
- Manager: iPASS Corporation
- Currency: TWD (NT$10,000 maximum load)
- Stored-value: Pay as you go
- Credit expiry: None
- Website: www.i-pass.com.tw/en

iPASS (Chinese: 一卡通; pinyin: yī kǎ tōng; Zhuyin Fuhao: ㄧ ㄎㄚˇ ㄊㄨㄥ) is a contactless smart card operated by the iPASS Corporation. Starting from February 13, 2017, both EasyCard and iPASS are accepted for virtually all public transport in Taiwan, including rapid transit, buses, and Taiwan Railway services. It also serves as an electronic wallet.

== History ==
iPASS was originally operated by the Kaohsiung Rapid Transit Corporation. It was released in December 2007 and began to operate in March 2008 along with the opening of the Kaohsiung Metro. The operation of iPASS was transferred to iPASS Corporation in early 2014, and subsequently added electronic wallet functionality in addition to its use as a transportation card.

In September 2018, iPASS launched iPASS Money in collaboration with LINE Pay, allowing users to transfer money to other LINE users and pay merchants through the LINE app. This made iPASS the first smart card provider in Taiwan to seek approval from the Financial Supervisory Commission to offer digital payment services.

== Usage ==
As of November 2023, iPASS is accepted for payment at:

- All Taipei Metro, New Taipei Metro, Taoyuan Metro, Taichung MRT, and Kaohsiung Metro stations
- Taiwan Railway stations
- City, coach, and tourist shuttle buses in Taiwan
- Ferries in Taipei, Kaohsiung, and Kinmen
- YouBike
- 7-Eleven, FamilyMart, Hi-Life, and OK Mart stores in Taiwan
- Various other merchants (full list)
- Scenic areas including Taipei Zoo and National Palace Museum (full list)

iPASS is compatible with contactless wallets including Google Wallet (on Xiaomi, POCO, and Fitbit devices) and Garmin Pay.

== Availability ==
The adult standard card is sold at:

- Kaohsiung Metro, Taipei Metro, Taichung Metro, and Taoyuan Metro stations
- 7-Eleven, FamilyMart, Hi-Life, and OK Mart convenience stores
- Taoyuan International Airport and Kaohsiung International Airport

In addition to a standard adult stored-value card, iPASS offers co-branded credit and debit cards, customized cards for large enterprises or schools, and cards for seniors, small children, students, and persons with disability certificates.
