= Fave (disambiguation) =

Fave is a French river.

It may also refer to:

- Fave (singer), (born 2000) Nigerian singer
- Fave (company), Malaysian fintech company
