= Fujitsu ARROWS Z ISW11F =

2011 smartphone model

ARROWS Z ISW11F
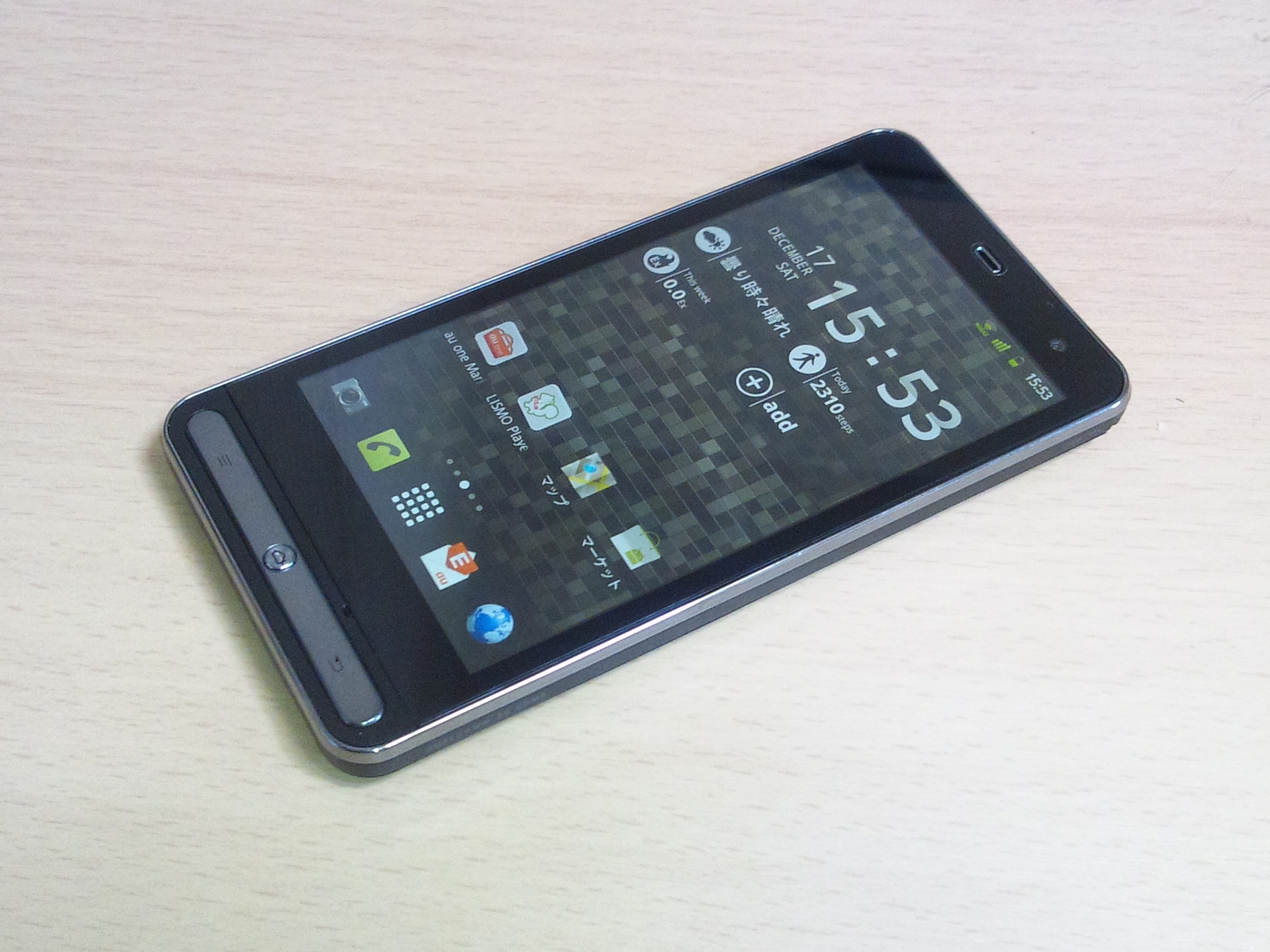
- Brand: au
- Manufacturer: Fujitsu Mobile Communications
- Type: Smartphone
- Series: ARROWS
- Family: IS series
- First released: December 17, 2011
- Successor: ARROWS Z ISW13F
- Compatible networks: 3G: CDMA 1X WIN (CDMA2000 1xMC) 800 MHz / 2 GHz / New 800 MHz; 2G: GSM 1.9 GHz / 1.8 GHz / 900 MHz / 850 MHz; 3.9G: +WiMAX (Mobile WiMAX) (IEEE 802.16e-2005)
- Form factor: Slate
- Colors: Fine White; Live Pink; Stream Blue; Neo Black
- Dimensions: 128 mm (5.0 in) H 64 mm (2.5 in) W 10.1 mm (0.40 in) D
- Weight: 131 g (4.6 oz)
- Operating system: Android 2.3.5, upgradable to 4.0.3
- System-on-chip: Texas Instruments OMAP4430 (apps); Qualcomm MDM6600 (modem)
- CPU: 1.2 GHz dual-core
- Memory: 1 GB RAM
- Storage: 8 GB ROM (approx. 6 GB data folder)
- Removable storage: microSD (up to 2 GB), microSDHC (up to 32 GB)
- SIM: au IC Card (Standard SIM)
- Battery: 1460 mAh (TSI12UAA)
- Charging: AC adapter: approx. 180 min DC adapter: approx. 230 min
- Rear camera: 13.1 MP CMOS, autofocus, image stabilization, Full HD video recording
- Front camera: 1.3 MP CMOS
- Display: 4.3 in (110 mm) TFT LCD, 1280×720 pixels (HD), 16.77 million colors
- Water resistance: Waterproof and dustproof
- Model: FJI11
- Made in: Japan

ARROWS Z ISW11F (FJI11) is a slate-style smartphone manufactured by Fujitsu Toshiba Mobile Communications (under the Fujitsu brand, now FCNT) for the Japanese market, sold by KDDI and Okinawa Cellular Telephone under the au brand. It is a model in the IS series and supports CDMA 1X WIN (CDMA2000 1xEV-DO, currently au 3G) and +WiMAX (Mobile WiMAX).

== History ==
September 26, 2011 – Officially announced by KDDI and Fujitsu Toshiba Mobile Communications. On October 26, 2011, the certification was passed by the Federal Communications Commission (FCC).

November 15, 2011 – The release date on the au website was postponed from late November 2011 to mid-December 2011.

December 17, 2011 – Released nationwide across Japan.

Early January 2012 – Sales began on KDDI's official e-commerce site, "au Online Shop".

Late January 2012 – Added support for "Kantan Menu", a utility tool providing a feature-phone-style UI.

July 22, 2012 – Due to the shutdown of the L800 MHz (Old 800 MHz band, CDMA Bandclass 3) voice and data service, subsequent services were shifted exclusively to the N800 MHz (New 800 MHz band, CDMA Bandclass 0 Subclass 2) and 2 GHz (CDMA Bandclass 6) bands.

November 13, 2012 – OS update to Android 4.0.3 began distribution.

== Specifications ==
=== Hardware ===
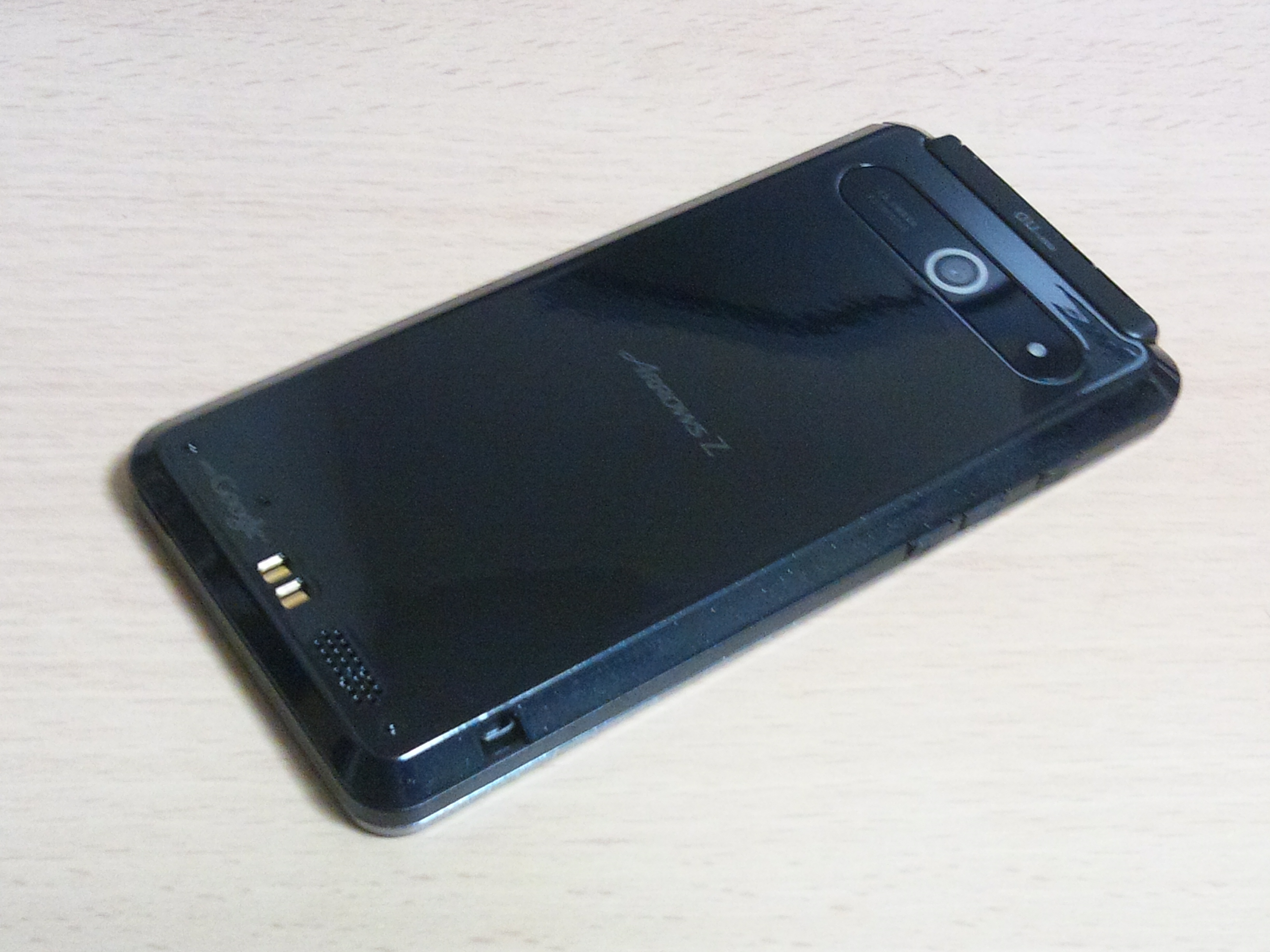
Back panel

The ARROWS Z ISW11F features a 4.3-inch TFT HD LCD display (1280×720 pixels, RGB stripe arrangement) displaying up to 16.77 million colors. It is powered by a dual-core Texas Instruments OMAP4430 processor clocked at 1.2 GHz alongside 1 GB of RAM and 8 GB of internal ROM (with approximately 6 GB user-accessible storage). External storage expansion is supported via microSD (up to 2 GB) and microSDHC (up to 32 GB) cards.

The device features a 13.1-megapixel rear CMOS camera using Sony's "Exmor R for mobile" back-illuminated sensor, supporting auto-focus, image stabilization, and Full HD video recording, along with a 1.3-megapixel front-facing CMOS camera.

Connectivity and feature support include:

- Wireless Connectivity: Wi-Fi (IEEE 802.11b/g/n), Mobile WiMAX (+WiMAX, IEEE 802.16e-2005), Bluetooth 2.1+EDR, and Infrared communication (IrSimple).
- Ports & Expansion: microUSB (with USB Host capability for external drives, keyboards, and mice), microHDMI output, a 3.5 mm headphone jack, and desktop dock charging pins.
- Japan-Specific Features: Osaifu-Keitai (FeliCa), 1seg TV tuner, Emergency Earthquake Warning, and IPX5/IPX8 waterproofing/dustproofing.
- Audio: Dolby Mobile v3 surround technology.
- Battery: Removable 1460 mAh battery (model TSI12UAA).

=== Software ===
The device originally launched with Android 2.3.5 (Gingerbread). It shipped with three home interface options: Fujitsu's proprietary "NX! comfort UI", au's "au HOME" (developed by Ocean Observation), and the stock Android 2.3 launcher. Standard web browsing with full Flash content playback support is included out of the box.

== Software Updates ==
- December 26, 2011: Fixed issues where au Simple Payment became unavailable when WiMAX was turned on and addressed high battery consumption.
- February 20, 2012: Fixed software update failures and GPS measurement errors.
- March 29, 2012: Resolved charging failures, slow charging, random reboots, and launch failures of the "My Collection" app.
- April 19, 2012: Fixed reboots during data transmission, browser crashes, and device reboots when non-microphone headphones were connected.
- July 5, 2012: Fixed reboots occurring when turning off Wi-Fi, reduced battery life during standby, and data corruption issues when inserting microSDXC cards.
- November 13, 2012: Major OS update to Android 4.0.3 (Ice Cream Sandwich, build FIK700). Key changes included:
  - Adoption of the Android 4.0 UI and native screenshot functionality (Power + Volume Down).
  - "au HOME" UI replaced with stock Android 4.0 launcher alongside "NX! comfort UI".
  - Addition of the "NX! Eco" power-saving application.
  - Support for MTP during USB connections.
  - Faster handoff times when switching from Wi-Fi to 3G networks.

== Known Issues ==
=== Overheating and Thermal Throttling ===
Due to hardware design, the ISW11F generates significant heat during extended heavy usage (such as gaming, continuous camera operation, or simultaneous charging and browsing). To prevent damage, safety mechanisms trigger to stop charging or temporarily disable device functions until the internal temperature drops.

=== WiMAX Voice Call Data Disconnection ===
Unlike other +WiMAX devices, the ISW11F cannot maintain a WiMAX data connection during an active voice call.

=== Lack of 64QAM WiMAX Support ===
The device does not support 64QAM modulation on Mobile WiMAX, limiting uplink speeds (incompatible with the maximum 15.4 Mbit/s uplink standard launched in late December 2011).
