= Diamond City =

Diamond City may refer to:

== Places ==
- Diamond City, Alberta, Canada
- Surat, Gujarat, India
- Diamond City (Shopping Centers), Japan
- Kimberley, Northern Cape, South Africa
- Diamond City, Arkansas, United States
- Diamond City, Montana, United States
- Diamond City, North Carolina, United States
- Wilkes-Barre, Pennsylvania, United States

== Other uses ==
- Diamond City (film), 1949 British film
- Diamond City, a fictional city in the WarioWare video game series
- Diamond City, a fictional settlement in the video game Fallout 4
