= Google Pay (payment method) =

Mobile payments platform developed by Google

- Developer: Google
- Release: May 26, 2011; 15 years ago (as Google Wallet); September 11, 2015; 11 years ago (as Android Pay); January 8, 2018; 8 years ago (as Google Pay)
- Operating system: Android 9 or later; Wear OS 2.18 or later; Fitbit OS
- Platform: In store: Android phones or Wear OS/Fitbit OS smartwatches with NFC; On the web: Android, ChromeOS, Windows, macOS, iOS, iPadOS, and Linux using Chrome, Edge, Firefox, Opera, Samsung Internet, or Safari
- License: Proprietary
- Website: pay.google.com/about/

Google Pay (formerly Android Pay) is a mobile payment service developed by Google to power in-app, online, and in-person contactless purchases on mobile devices, enabling users to make payments with Android phones or Wear OS watches, in addition to only online & in-app purchases on Android tablets and Android/ChromeOS laptops. Users can authenticate via a PIN, passcode, or biometrics such as 3D face scanning or fingerprint recognition.

As of 2026, it is available in 111 countries.

== Service ==
Google Pay acceptance mark

Google payment apps

2006–2013 Google Checkout
2011–2015 Google Wallet
2015–2018 Android Pay	2015–2018 Google Wallet	2017–2018 Tez
2018–2022 Google Pay	2018–2020 Google Pay Send	2018–2020 Google Pay
2022–present Google Wallet	2020–present Google Pay

See also: Google Pay (payment method)

Google Pay uses near-field communication (NFC) to transmit card information facilitating funds transfer to the retailer. It replaces the credit or debit card chip and PIN or magnetic stripe transaction at point-of-sale terminals by allowing the user to upload these in Google Wallet. It is similar to contactless payments already used in many countries, with the addition of two-factor authentication. The service lets Android devices wirelessly communicate with point of sale systems using a near-field communication (NFC) antenna and host-based card emulation (HCE).

When the user makes a payment to a merchant, Google Pay does not send the actual payment card number. Instead, it generates a virtual account number representing the user's account information.

Google Pay requires that a screen lock be set on the phone or watch. An age limit minimum of 13 years is imposed on users seeking to manage the service themselves. However, younger users can still have access to Google Pay if a parent or guardian manages Wallet for them, and utilizes an approved bank.

Users can add payment cards to the service by taking a photo of the card, or by entering the card information manually. To pay at points of sale, users hold their authenticated device to the point of sale system. The service has smart-authentication, allowing the system to detect when the device is considered secure (for instance, if unlocked in the last five minutes) and challenge if necessary for unlock information.

=== Technology ===
Google Pay uses the EMV Payment Tokenization Specification.

The service keeps customer payment information private from the retailer by replacing the customer's credit or debit card Funding Primary Account Number (FPAN) with a tokenized Device Primary Account Number (DPAN) and creates a "dynamic security code [...] generated for each transaction". The "dynamic security code" is the cryptogram in an EMV-mode transaction, and the Dynamic Card Verification Value (dCVV) in a magnetic-stripe-data emulation-mode transaction. Users can also remotely halt the service on a lost phone via Google's Find Hub service.

To pay at points of sale with a default payment card, users hold their authenticated Android or Wear OS device (Pixel Watch 2 or later) to the point-of-sale system's NFC reader. Opening the Google Wallet app beforehand is not necessary on these platforms, though Fitbit OS users must authenticate by opening the Google Wallet app prior to payment.

=== Consumer Device Cardholder Verification Method (CDCVM) ===
In EMV-mode transactions, Google Pay supports the use of the Consumer Device Cardholder Verification Method (CDCVM) using biometrics, pattern, or the device's passcode. The use of CDCVM allows the device itself to provide verification for the transaction and may not require the cardholder to sign a receipt or enter their PIN.

=== Security ===
Payments for supported transit networks are able to skip verification, either via a payment card or transit card. Unlike Apple Pay's Express Mode, this is not available when the battery is low.

On Fitbit OS, this option is not available. All transactions on Fitbit devices must be authenticated by opening the Wallet app prior to tapping.

Since 2022, the functionality of adding cards to Google Pay requires devices to pass Play Integrity API checks. This implies having a device with locked bootloader and no rooting.

== Availability ==
=== Supported countries ===
Global availability of Google Pay Available Suspended

Date (in chronological order)	Support for payment cards issued in
September 11, 2015	United States (Note: includes Puerto Rico and US Virgin Islands, except American Samoa, Guam and Northern Mariana Islands)
May 18, 2016	United Kingdom (Note: includes Isle of Man and Jersey, except British Overseas Territories)
June 28, 2016	Singapore
July 14, 2016	Australia
October 20, 2016	Hong Kong
November 17, 2016	Poland
December 1, 2016	New Zealand
December 7, 2016	Ireland
December 13, 2016	Japan
March 7, 2017	Belgium
May 23, 2017	Russia (Note: As of March 2022, Google Pay for Mastercard and Visa has been suspended in Russia until further notice because of international sanctions for the Russian invasion of Ukraine and due to financial uncertainty in Russia. Since March 24, 2022, Mir cards have later been disabled from Google Pay.)
May 31, 2017	Canada
June 1, 2017	Taiwan
July 26, 2017	Spain
September 18, 2017	India
November 1, 2017	Ukraine (Note: except Crimea and parts of Donetsk, Kherson, Luhansk and Zaporizhzhia Oblasts under Russian occupation)
November 14, 2017	Brazil
November 14, 2017	Czech Republic
February 28, 2018	Slovakia
June 26, 2018	Germany
August 1, 2018	Croatia
September 19, 2018	Italy
September 19, 2018	San Marino
September 19, 2018	Vatican City
October 30, 2018	Denmark
October 30, 2018	Finland
October 30, 2018	Greenland
October 30, 2018	Norway
October 30, 2018	Sweden
November 14, 2018	United Arab Emirates
November 28, 2018	Chile
December 11, 2018	France (Note: includes Guadeloupe, French Guiana, French Southern and Antarctic Lands, Martinique, Réunion, Saint Barthélemy, Saint Martin and Saint Pierre and Miquelon)
December 11, 2018	Monaco
April 30, 2019	Switzerland
October 29, 2019	Faroe Islands
November 17, 2020	Austria
November 17, 2020	Bulgaria
November 17, 2020	Estonia
November 17, 2020	Greece
November 17, 2020	Hungary
November 17, 2020	Latvia
November 17, 2020	Lithuania
November 17, 2020	Netherlands (Note: except overseas territories)
November 17, 2020	Portugal
November 17, 2020	Romania
December 7, 2021	Israel
December 7, 2021	Kazakhstan
August 23, 2022	Azerbaijan
August 23, 2022	Iceland
August 23, 2022	Moldova (Note: except Transnistria)
August 23, 2022	Qatar
August 23, 2022	Serbia
August 23, 2022	South Africa
November 15, 2022	Armenia
November 15, 2022	Costa Rica
November 15, 2022	Cyprus (Note: except Northern Cyprus)
November 15, 2022	Ecuador
November 15, 2022	Georgia (Note: except Abkhazia and South Ossetia)
November 15, 2022	Kyrgyzstan
November 15, 2022	Kuwait
November 15, 2022	Liechtenstein
November 15, 2022	Luxembourg
November 15, 2022	Malaysia
November 15, 2022	Malta
November 15, 2022	Mexico
November 15, 2022	Slovenia
November 15, 2022	Thailand
November 15, 2022	Vietnam
June 6, 2023	Argentina
August 8, 2023	Albania
August 8, 2023	Bosnia and Herzegovina
August 8, 2023	Montenegro
August 8, 2023	North Macedonia
November 1, 2023	Colombia
November 1, 2023	Peru
February 27, 2024	Dominican Republic
September 27, 2024	Bermuda
September 27, 2024	Cambodia
September 27, 2024	El Salvador
September 27, 2024	Guernsey
September 27, 2024	Kosovo
September 27, 2024	Morocco
September 27, 2024	Nicaragua
September 27, 2024	Panama
September 27, 2024	Paraguay
September 27, 2024	Tajikistan
November 6, 2024	Andorra
November 6, 2024	Bahrain
November 6, 2024	Guatemala
November 6, 2024	Honduras
November 6, 2024	Macau
November 6, 2024	Uruguay
March 11, 2025	Jordan
March 11, 2025	Pakistan
June 24, 2025	Bangladesh
June 24, 2025	Lebanon
July 10, 2025	Oman
September 15, 2025	Saudi Arabia
November 18, 2025	Mongolia
November 18, 2025	Philippines
November 19, 2025	Sri Lanka
December 9, 2025	New Caledonia
December 17, 2025	Botswana
March 19, 2026	French Polynesia
June 9, 2026	Bahamas
June 9, 2026	Barbados
June 9, 2026	Cayman Islands
June 9, 2026	Jamaica
June 9, 2026	Trinidad and Tobago
June 10, 2026	Mauritius
October 27, 2026	Uzbekistan
October 28, 2026	Nigeria
November 13, 2026	Seychelles

=== Supported networks ===
- Visa / Visa Debit (Android, Wear OS, Fitbit OS)
- Mastercard / Debit Mastercard (Android, Wear OS, Fitbit OS)
- American Express (Android, Wear OS, Fitbit OS)
- Discover (Android & Wear OS)
- Diners Club (Android & Wear OS)
- JCB (Android & Wear OS)
- Maestro (Android & Wear OS)
- Elo in Brazil (Android & Wear OS)
- EFTPOS in Australia (Android & Wear OS)
- Interac in Canada (Android & Wear OS)
- Bancomat in Italy (Android & Wear OS)
- QUICPay (Android & Wear OS)
- iD (Android & Wear OS)
- WAON (Android only)
- Edy (Android only)
- Mir in Russia (Android only) (suspended on March 24, 2022)
- nanaco (Android only)
- Pix (Android only)
- mada in Saudi Arabia (Android & Wear OS)
- Alelo in Brazil
- Jaywan in the United Arab Emirates
- Cartes Bancaires in France

== See also ==
- Apple Pay
- Apple Wallet
- Cash App
- Microsoft Pay
- PayPal
- Samsung Pay
- Samsung Wallet
- Unified Payments Interface
- Venmo
- WeChat Pay
