= Google Pay =

Google Pay may refer to:

- Google Pay (payment method), a digital payments method
  - Google Pay (2018–2022), a digital wallet app, formerly Android Pay and now Google Wallet
- Google Pay (mobile app), a mobile payments app
  - Google Pay (Tez), a localized app for India
- Google Pay Send, a peer-to-peer payments service

== See also ==
- {{Google payment apps}}, a diagram of the above
- Google Checkout, the predecessor to the original Google Wallet
