= Waon =

Japanese electronic money system

Waon Card

Waon (ワオン) is a Japanese electronic money system introduced by ÆON in April 2007. It is a rechargeable contactless smart card. Like many other smart card systems in Japan, it uses RFID technology developed by Sony known as FeliCa. Its name comes from waon (和音), meaning chord. The card's official mascot is a white dog. The card reader makes a "waon" sound upon successful transaction, a Japanese onomatopoeia for dog barks.

Unlike the nanaco card issued by Seven & I Holdings, the basic Waon card can be purchased without any registrations. Like other FeliCa-based systems, Waon has a mobile payment system, known as Mobile Waon.

== Types of cards ==
- Waon Card: A basic prepaid card that does not require registration.
- Waon Card Plus: A card for ÆON Card holders. Accepts postpay as well.
- ÆON Card (Waon Card integrated): A credit card.

Waon Card is issued by ÆON, while other two cards are issued by AEON Credit Service.

== Usable stores ==
As of September 2007:

- 130 stores in Kantō region, Yamanashi, and Niigata
  - AEON Shopping Center
  - AEON Supercenter
  - AEON Tower Pharmacy
  - Carrefour
  - Diamond City
  - JUSCO
  - Karadalab
  - Kids Kyōwakoku
  - Marinpia
  - MaxValu
  - Mega Mart
  - Ministop
  - My Basket
  - MYCAL (Saty and Vivre)

Within 2008:

- 23,000 stores of AEON Group in all Japan

In Kantō region, AEON Group stores accept Suica, iD, and PASMO as well. For other regions, they plan to accept other cards such as ICOCA or TOICA.

All JAL Mileage Bank cards issued in Japan built-in with Waon. However, JAL Mileage Bank cards issued overseas does not feature this function.

== See also ==
- List of smart cards
- Electronic money
- Edy
- nanaco
