= TEZ =

TEZ may refer to:

- Aaj Tak Tez, an Indian Hindi-language news television channel
- Tez (software), a defunct Indian payments app by Google
- TEZ Tour, a Russian tour operator
- Tezpur Airport, Tezpur, Assam, India
- Tatra Electric Railway (Slovak: Tatranská elektrická železnica), a railway in Slovakia
- Total Exclusion Zone, an area designated by the United Kingdom during the Falklands War surrounding the Falkland Islands
