= IC e-card =

Contactless smart card system in Matsuyama, Japan

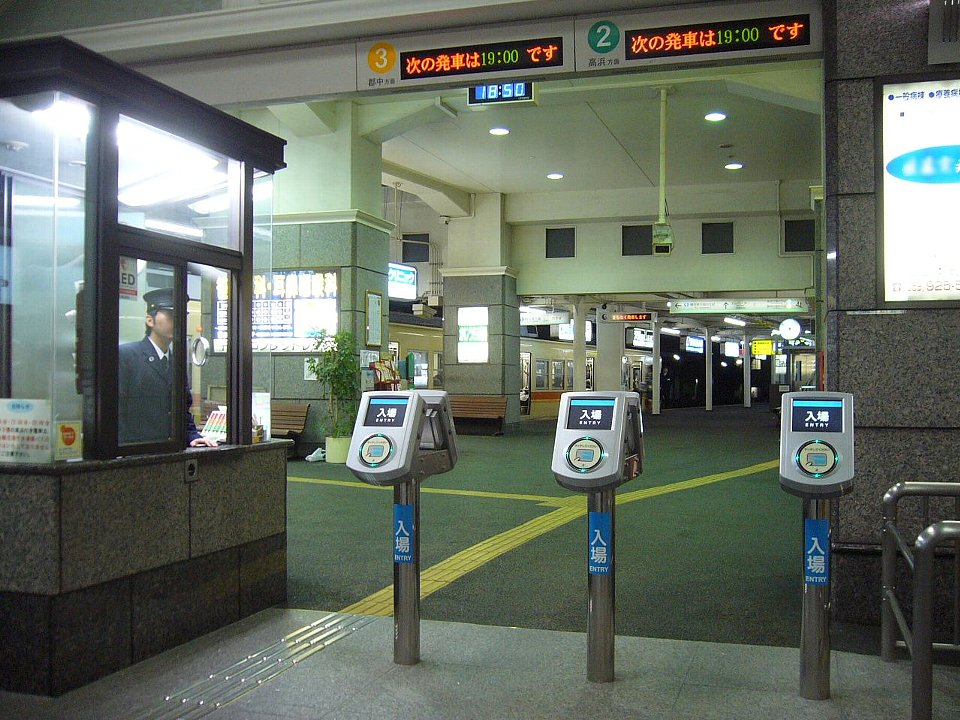
The ticket gate of Matsuyamashi Station with IC e-card readers, 2007

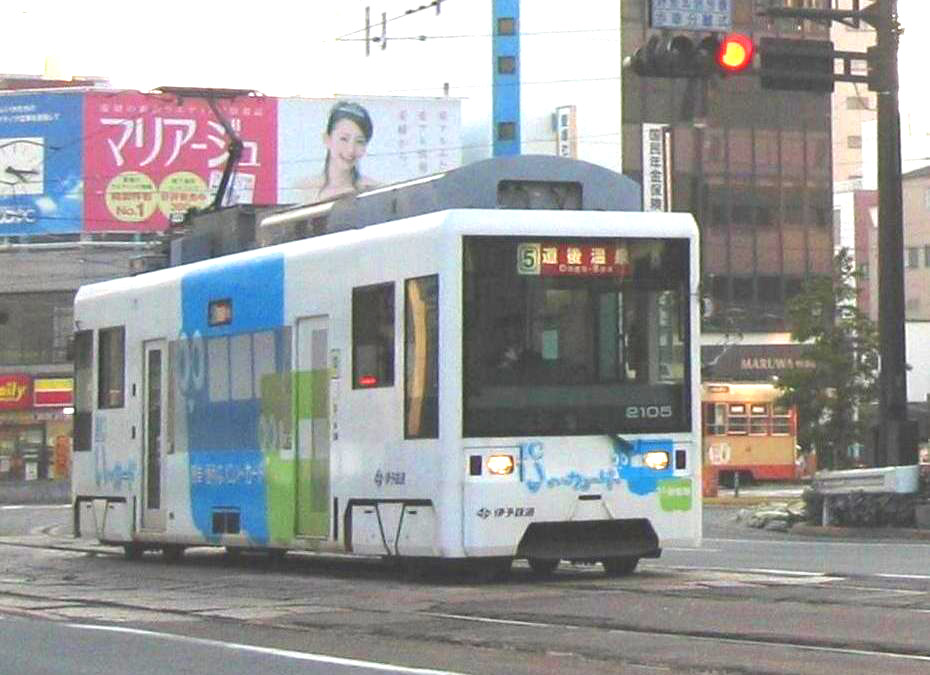
Iyotetsu tramcar advertising IC e-card

IC e-card (ICい～カード, Ai shī ī-kādo) is a rechargeable contactless smart card ticketing system for public transport by Iyo Railway (Iyotetsu) in Matsuyama, Japan. The card was introduced from August 23, 2005, succeeding the previous e-card, a magnetic prepaid card. IC e-card was the first smart card system by Japanese transportation operators with Osaifu-Keitai mobile payment service (Mobile FeliCa), preceding that of Mobile Suica.

ICOCA was introduced on all Iyotetsu routes and services on March 18, 2025. IC e-card sales ended the same day, while recharging capabilities ended the following month. The card remained usable on the Iyotetsu network until September 30, 2025, after which it was fully supplanted by JR West's ICOCA and a digital ticketing system known as MICAN App.

== Types of cards ==
- IC e-card
- IC e-card commuter pass
- Mobile e-card
- JAL Mileage Bank Iyotetsu e-card
- Ehime F.C. e-card

== Usable area ==
- Iyotetsu Lines
  - Heavy railways; Gunchū Line, Takahama Line, and Yokogawara Line.
  - Tramways, all the lines.
- Iyotetsu Bus; all the regular bus lines, including limousine buses to Matsuyama Airport and Matsuyama Port, a railway-transfer bus between Takahama Station and Matsuyama Port, but excluding a service by Setouchi Bus.
- Iyotetsu Taxi; Matsuyama area only.
- Ishizuchisan SA and Iyonada SA at Matsuyama Expressway.
- Whale Express, a highway bus between Matsuyama and Kōchi.
- A few stores in Matsuyama, including Iyotetsu Takashimaya department store.
