= Magnetic secure transmission =

Mobile payment technology

Magnetic secure transmission (MST) is the name for mobile payment technology in which devices such as smartphones emit a signal that mimics the magnetic stripe on a traditional payment card.

== Overview ==
MST sends a magnetic signal from the device to the payment terminal's card reader. It emulates swiping a physical card without having to upgrade the terminal's software or hardware to support more advanced technology, such as contactless payments. Hence, in contrast to payments using near-field communication, MST technology is compatible with nearly all payment terminals that possess a magnetic stripe reader.

MST is designed to transmit from within 3 in (76 mm) of the magnetic card reader. Outside of physical transmission, there are no changes to the magnetic stripe card system (i.e., reception, processing, information content, and cryptographic protocols). However, the information being transmitted being dynamic may allow tokenization.

MST was originally developed by LoopPay, which was acquired by Samsung in 2015 and incorporated into its Samsung Pay service. In 2017, LG launched its competing LG Pay service, which uses a similar technology called Wireless Magnetic Communication (WMC).

The original MST and WMC mimicked unencrypted magnetic stripe technology in order to be compatible with older credit card terminals. The wireless transmissions were not encrypted and therefore not considered "secure". The Samsung Pay and LG implementations of MST use secure EMV compatible tokens and are considered to be secure.
