= LG Pay =

Mobile payment service

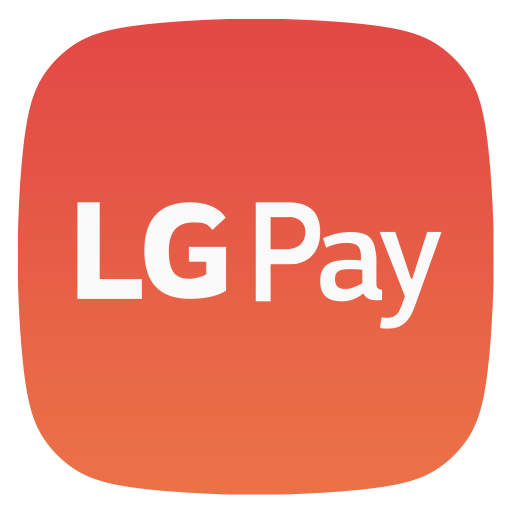
- Developer(s): LG Electronics
- Initial release: June 2, 2017; 7 years ago
- Operating system: Android
- Platform: Selected LG G series & LG V series smartphones
- License: Proprietary
- Website: www.lge.co.kr/lgekor/microsite/lgpay/lgpayMain.do

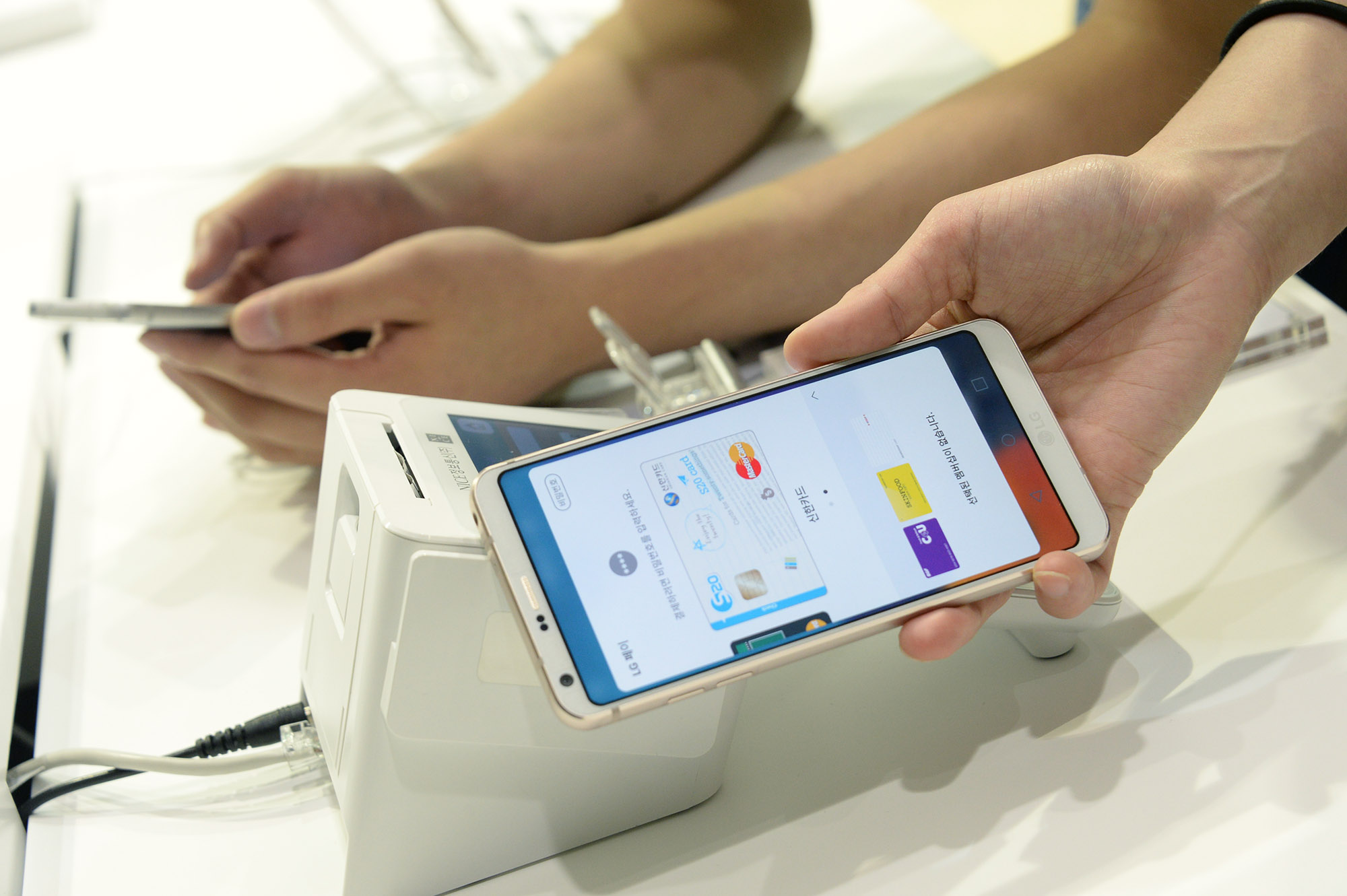
LG Pay payment screen on the LG G6

LG Pay was a mobile payment and digital wallet service by LG Electronics that let users make payments using compatible phones. The service supported contactless payments using near-field communication (NFC), and also incorporated wireless magnetic communication that allowed contactless payments to be used on payment terminals that only supported magnetic stripe transactions.

LG Pay was discontinued in the United States on 1 November 2021, and in South Korea, the service was discontinued on 30 July 2024.

== Service ==
LG Pay was developed from the intellectual property of Dynamics; plans for the service were announced in November 2015. The service supported both NFC-based mobile payment systems (which are prioritized when support is detected), as well as those that only support magnetic stripes. This was accomplished via technology known as "Wireless Magnetic Communication" (WMC), which transmitted card data to a payment terminal's swipe slot via emitting wireless magnetic data pulses, causing the terminal to register it as if it were a normal magnetic stripe.

On phones, the menu of the wallet was launched by swiping from the bottom of the screen. Different credit, debit and loyalty cards could be loaded into the app, and selected by swiping between them on-screen.

In South Korea, LG Pay could be used for online store payments, transportation card payments, membership cards, and to withdraw money on selected banks' ATMs.

== Security ==
LG Pay's security measures were based on LG Mobile and South Korean card companies such as Shinhan Card technologies; credit card information was stored in a secure token. Payments had to be authenticated using either a one-time password, fingerprint scan, or, later, 3D facial recognition .

== See also ==
- Magnetic secure transmission
- Apple Pay
- Google Pay
- Microsoft Pay
- Samsung Pay
- KakaoPay
- Naver Pay
