= Online wallet =

Digital tracking of online shopping information

Credit cards belongs to accounts.

An online wallet is a software or web service that allows users to store and control their online shopping information, such as logins, passwords, shipping address and credit card details. It also provides a method for consumers to purchase products from online retailers.

These systems can be integrated with directly or can be combined with operator and credit card payments through a unified mobile web payment platform. Examples include Google Wallet, PayPal, Yandex.Money.

== History ==
=== 1979-1990: Pre-Internet Origins ===
English entrepreneur Michael Aldrich invented online shopping in 1979. His system connected a modified domestic TV to a real-time transaction processing computer via a domestic telephone line. He believed that videotex, the modified domestic TV technology with a simple menu-driven human–computer interface, was a 'new, universally applicable, participative communication medium — the first since the invention of the telephone.' This enabled 'closed' corporate information systems to be opened to 'outside' correspondents not just for transaction processing but also for e-messaging and information retrieval and dissemination, later known as e-business. His definition of the new mass communications medium as 'participative' [interactive, many-to-many] was fundamentally different from the traditional definitions of mass communication and mass media and a precursor to the social networking on the Internet 25 years later.

In March 1980 he went on to launch Redifon's Office Revolution, which allowed consumers, customers, agents, distributors, suppliers and service companies to be connected on-line to the corporate systems and allow business transactions to be completed electronically in real-time.

During the 1980s he designed, manufactured, sold, installed, maintained and supported many online shopping systems, using videotex technology. These systems which also provided voice response and handprint processing pre-date the Internet and the World Wide Web, the IBM PC, and Microsoft MS-DOS, and were installed mainly in the UK by large corporations.

=== 1991-1998: The Dawn of E-Commerce ===
The first World Wide Web server and browser, created by Tim Berners-Lee in 1990, opened for commercial use in 1991. Thereafter, subsequent technological innovations emerged in 1994: online banking, the opening of an online pizza shop by Pizza Hut, Netscape's SSL v2 encryption standard for secure data transfer, and Intershop's first online shopping system. Immediately after, Amazon.com launched its online shopping site in 1995 and eBay was also introduced in 1995. During this period, consumers typically entered credit card details manually for every transaction.

=== 1999-2005: The "Wallet" and Single Sign-On Era ===
In the late 1990s, the first dedicated "Online Wallets" emerged to solve the friction of repeated data entry.

- Obongo: Founded in 1999, Obongo pioneered the concept of a secure, cloud-based store for usernames, passwords, and payment information. It used a browser plug-in to offer "one-click" registration and checkout across disparate website, forming the precursor to modern Single Sign-On (SSO) and automated form filling.
- AOL Wallet: Following its acquisition of Obongo in 2001, AOL integrated this technology to create the AOL Wallet. This allowed millions of users to shop at partner retailers without re-entering the financial data, competing with similar initiatives like Microsoft Passport.
- PayPal: Originally founded as Confinity, focused on encryption of data on handheld devices like Palm Pilot, it pivoted to web-based payments after merging with X.com in the year 2000. It became a dominant player in person-to-person payment and auction-based transactions. Today it acts as an online wallet for any kind of payment.

=== 2006-Present: Mobile Integration and Tokenization ===
The modern era is defined by the move from browser-based storage to operating system-level integration and tokenization.

- Google Wallet and Apple Pay: In 2011, Google Wallet launched, utilizing Near Field Communication (NFC) to bridge online and physical payments. Apple Pay (2014) further popularized the use of secure elements and biometric authentication to authorize transactions without sharing actual credit card numbers with merchants.
- Platform Ecosystems: Modern wallets have evolved into comprehensive identity managers, storing digital versions of driver's licenses, event tickets etc., moving beyond financial transaction tools.

== Acceptance as a form of payment ==
Due to slow adoption and high competition, there is currently no one standard online wallet that is universally accepted. The acceptance of the online wallet as a form of payment varies based on both individual store policy and the type of online wallet being used. For example, Google Wallet can be used at MasterCard Paypass locations within the United States. Conversely, Bitcoin, while accepted internationally, is much less frequently accepted, due in part to its connection to illegal websites like Silk Road (marketplace). Bitcoin can also be held in an online cryptocurrency wallet. It is predicted that in the near future, as the use of online wallets increases, consumer attraction to specific technologies will reduce the number of specific online wallets.

== See also ==
- Electronic money
- Online shopping
- Digital wallet
