= NowSecure =

American mobile security company

- Company type: Private
- Industry: Mobile Security, Security software
- Predecessor: viaForensics
- Founded: United States
- Headquarters: United States
- Area served: International
- Key people: Alan Snyder, Andrew Hoog, David Weinstein, Katie Bochnowski
- Products: NowSecure Forensics, NowSecure Lab, The NowSecure Mobile Apps
- Number of employees: 51-200
- Website: nowsecure.com

NowSecure (Formerly viaForensics) is a Chicago-based mobile security company that publishes mobile app and device security software.

== 2009: Beginnings ==
Andrew Hoog, former CEO and co-founder, served as a chief information officer (CIO) prior to his current roles. During his tenure as CIO, he conducted an internal investigation to determine if a dismissed employee had taken sensitive company data. Instead of outsourcing to a forensic firm, Hoog carried out the investigation personally and subsequently engaged in additional forensic activities alongside his primary responsibilities.

== 2009-2014: From Forensics to Security ==
Andrew Hoog and Chee-Young Kim provided the initial funding for the company, which was initially named Chicago Electronic Discovery and later rebranded as viaForensics.

Hoog dedicated his efforts to mobile forensics full-time, while Kim maintained her corporate employment, contributing to the company's business development during evenings and weekends. By March 2011, viaForensics had become profitable enough to offer employee benefits, prompting Kim to leave her corporate position and join the company on a full-time basis. On June 5, 2011, viaForensics released viaExtract 1.0 at a conference in Myrtle Beach. In March 2013, the company launched viaLab, a software product designed to automate the testing of mobile applications for security vulnerabilities, such as man-in-the-middle attacks, SSL strip attacks, coding issues, and susceptibility to reverse engineering.

== 2014-Present: Rebrand to NowSecure ==
In 2014, viaForensics launched viaProtect, an app to show users destinations and sources of data to and from their mobile devices, at RSA Conference. The company then began to focus more on similar individual and enterprise device protection. As a result of this focus shift, viaForensics decided to rebrand as NowSecure.

In 2019, NowSecure raised $19 million in funding. Some of NowSecure's notable customers include brands such as Capital One, Carfax, Inc., Citigroup, Shell plc, Kellogg's, and Home Depot.

== Products ==
NowSecure publishes a range of software products, including NowSecure Forensics, NowSecure Lab, and NowSecure Mobile Apps. NowSecure Forensics, previously known as viaExtract, is a tool used primarily by law enforcement agencies for extracting data from mobile devices, including recovery of deleted information and data searches. NowSecure Lab, formerly viaLab, is software designed for scanning mobile applications for vulnerabilities. NowSecure Mobile Apps, aimed at end-users, is a vulnerability scanner compatible with iOS, Android, and Blackphone platforms.

== See also ==
- Mobile Security
