= OnePlus Open =

Foldable smartphone developed by OnePlus and Oppo

- Brand: OnePlus
- Manufacturer: OnePlus
- Type: Foldable
- Predecessor: None
- Successor: None
- Form factor: Foldable mini tablet phone
- Colors: Emerald Dusk, Voyager Black, Crimson Shadow
- Operating system: Android 13 with OxygenOS 13.2, later updated to AI version 16 in 2026.
- System-on-chip: Qualcomm Snapdragon 8 Gen 2
- Memory: 16GB RAM
- Storage: 512GB or 1TB (on the Apex Edition only)
- SIM: Nano-SIM and eSIM
- Battery: 4,805 mAh Dual-cell (3,295 + 1,510 mAh)
- Charging: 67W SuperVOOC wired. No wireless charging.
- Display: 7.82in
- External display: 6.31in
- Website: www.oneplus.com/us/open

The OnePlus Open is a foldable smartphone manufactured by OnePlus. The phone was co-developed with its parent company Oppo which markets the phone as the Oppo Find N3. The product was revealed on 19 October 2023.

A follow-up VIP Apex Edition, Crimson Shadow, was launched late 2024, with 1TB storage as opposed to the standard 512GB storage. There is also an additional security chip built in which shows for VIP access when toggling the alert slider to the standard silent mode. VIP mode disables camera, microphone and location on a hardware level so no app can access them. You have the software option in settings though, to change VIP mode back to the regular mode of ring, vibrate, silent. The Crimson Shadow back is made from the same faux leather as the Voyager Black model.

== History ==
In early October 2023, OnePlus' co-founder and CEO Pete Lau confirmed that the OnePlus Open was designed by both OnePlus and Oppo, and that it would be released under both brands with different names. It was rumored that Oppo's name would be the Oppo Find N3.

== Hardware ==
The OnePlus Open has a 6.31-inch front screen. When it is folded out, the screen is 7.82 inches. It is 11.7 millimeters thick when folded. It has 120hz AMOLED screens on both the front and inside. It has 16 GB of RAM and 512 GB of internal storage. It has a 4,805-mAh battery and the Qualcomm Snapdragon 8 Gen 2 chipset. The phone has no wireless charging. The phone comes in 2 finishes depending on color the Black model has a leatherette back while the Emerald Dusk model has a glass back. On the back it has a triple camera setup, in partnership with Hasselblad. The main camera is a 48MP Sony LYT-T808 "Pixel Stacked" Sensor, 1/1.43" sensor, 1.12 μm, ƒ/1.7, AF. The telephoto is a 64MP OV64B Sensor with 3× Optical Zoom, 6× in-sensor zoom, 1/2" sensor, 0.7 μm, ƒ/2.6, AF. The ultrawide camera is a 48MP Sony IMX581 with 114° FOV, 1/2" sensor, ƒ/2.2, AF.

== Software Improvements ==
The OnePlus Open runs OxygenOS 13.2, which the company says it will support with four years of OS upgrades for the Open and five years of security updates. This iteration of OxygenOS comes with some multitasking features to make use of the large inner screen. Two apps can be opened in a split view but a third app can be added that hovers on the side of the display so it's partially visible and can be tabbed over to. App pairs and trios can be saved as home screen shortcuts.

There is a taskbar that can be displayed and hidden easily, and it includes recent apps as well as a folder of recent documents. There is also support for floating windows, which can be positioned anywhere on the screen, resized, and minimized to a tab at the side of the screen.

By default, when an app is opened on the inner display, it will expand to fill the whole screen. Opening a second app in split screen view does not automatically resize the first app to display on half the screen, however. The first app moves over, and the view of it is cut off.

This can be worked around in settings by dictating how each individual app should display on the main screen — in 16:9, 4:3, or full screen. Switching to 16:9 makes room for another app on the unoccupied portion of the screen without cutting off the first one.

== Pricing ==
The OnePlus Open starts at US$1,600. At launch, trade-in discounts of $200 or more are available, including a $200 trade-in discount on any smartphone of any condition.
