= Tez (software) =

Digital payments application for Indians

- Developer: Google
- Initial release: 17 August 2017; 8 years ago
- Platform: Android, iOS
- Successor: Google Pay
- License: Proprietary

Tez was a mobile payments service by Google, targeted at users in India, later folded into the new Google Pay app on 28 August 2018. It operated atop the Unified Payments Interface, developed by the National Payments Corporation of India. The product was created as part of Google's Next Billion Users initiative led by Caesar Sengupta, former vice president and general manager, Payments & Next Billion Users, Google.

Tez worked on the vast majority of India's smartphones (with apps for both Android and iOS) with the Android app supporting English, Hindi, Tamil, Bengali, Gujarati, Kannada, Marathi, and Telugu. There were plans to release the app in other emerging countries including Vietnam, Indonesia, and Thailand. "Tez" is the Hindi word for "Fast". Within 37 days after being launched, Tez got about 8.5 million installations. Over 30 million transactions were made on the app as of 27 October 2017.

== Service ==
Google payment apps

2006–2013 Google Checkout
2011–2015 Google Wallet
2015–2018 Android Pay | 2015–2018 Google Wallet | 2017–2018 Tez
2018–2022 Google Pay | 2018–2020 Google Pay Send | 2018–2020 Google Pay
2022–present Google Wallet | 2020–present Google Pay

See also: Google Pay (payment method)

=== Acceptability ===
Tez was accepted by PVR Cinemas, redBus, McDonald's, ACT Broadband, State government Electricity boards and was expected to be joined by a number of other businesses like Dish TV, Jet Airways and Domino's, Vodafone Idea, Swiggy, Zomato, Uber, Ola, Clubfactory, Zappfresh, Amazon, Flipkart and many more businesses. Google was also working with existing advertisers and online e-commerce platforms like Shopify and payment aggregators like BillDesk and PayU. Google planned to add even more ways to pay on Tez (e.g., credit cards and wallets). Select phones from manufacturer partners Lava, Nokia Mobile, and Panasonic would have come with Tez preinstalled.

=== Device compatibility ===
The app was compatible with the vast majority of Android and iOS devices.

=== Technology ===
The application did not require users to share any personal information such as mobile numbers or usernames like other payment applications. Instead, it used audio QR codes that relied on sound transmitted at a frequency inaudible to the human ear from the payee handset to the merchant handset. This technology does away with the need for NFC chips on the handsets, which gave it an advantage since a significant number of smartphones in India and other developing markets do not have NFC chips embedded.
