= Microsoft Pay =

Former mobile payment service

- Developer: Microsoft
- Initial release: June 21, 2016; 9 years ago
- Operating system: Windows 10
- Platform: Microsoft Edge
- License: Proprietary
- Website: https://www.microsoft.com/en-us/payments

Microsoft Pay (previously Microsoft Wallet) was a mobile payment and digital wallet service by Microsoft that allowed users to make payments and store loyalty cards on certain mobile devices, as well on PCs using the Microsoft Edge browser. Microsoft Pay does not require Microsoft Pay-specific contactless payment terminals, and supported existing contactless terminals if used on mobile devices. Similar to Android Pay, Microsoft Pay utilized host card emulation (HCE) for making in-store payments.

The service's original name was also originally used for a feature included in Internet Explorer 4 and Internet Explorer 5 that allowed users to store credit card information to use with a limited number of supported sites.

== History ==
Microsoft Wallet was launched on June 21, 2016, in the United States. It was initially released to participants of Microsoft's Windows Insider program and was later made available to the general public on August 16, 2016, with the release of the Windows 10 Mobile Anniversary Update. The service was launched exclusively to Windows 10 Mobile in conjunction with an update to Microsoft's Wallet app.

The launch of the Microsoft Wallet service established Microsoft's own in-house mobile payment platform, enabling it to bypass its prior dependencies on third parties for contactless payments on Windows-based smartphones. Microsoft's mobile operating system had previously supported contactless payments for NFC-equipped handsets as early as 2012 in Windows Phone 8 and the original Wallet app. However, in the prior operating system, Microsoft depended on third-party intervention to make the payments feasible. Mobile carriers had to support this by providing secure element SIM cards to customers. Additionally, in the United States, mobile carriers AT&T, T-Mobile, and Verizon required use of their joint-venture developed platform, Softcard, to process the payments. When Softcard was purchased (and subsequently shut down) by Google in early 2015, it left the Windows platform without a viable contactless payment system in the United States.

The platform allowed Microsoft to coordinate directly with financial institutions and credit card issuers to make contactless payments on Windows-based smartphones, beginning in the United States. On November 15, 2017, Microsoft rebranded Microsoft Wallet to Microsoft Pay and allowed payments to be processed through it on Edge.

Microsoft retired the service on February 28, 2019, coinciding with the company's end of support for Windows 10 Mobile and subsequent exit from the mobile OS market at the end of the year.

== See also ==
- LG Pay
- Apple Pay
- Google Pay
- Apple Wallet
- Samsung Pay
