= Wallet (surname) =

Wallet is both a surname of Dutch origin. Those with the name include:

- Bart Wallet (born 1977), Dutch historian
- Bernd Wallet, Dutch bishop
- Benedict Wallet Vilakazi (1906–1947), South African writer
