= Nanaco =

Japanese electronic money system

Suica
- Location: Usable nationwide in Japan at all Seven & I Holdings owned stores, 7-11, Denny's, and Ito-Yokado and other participating third party retailers.
- Launched: May 2007
- Technology: FeliCa
- Manager: Seven & I Holdings
- Currency: Japanese yen (¥50,000 maximum load)
- Stored-value: Pay as you go
- Credit expiry: Points expire
- Website: www.nanaco-net.jp

Nanaco (trademarked in lowercase as nanaco) is a prepaid cash-rechargeable contactless electronic money card, and point based loyalty program used at Seven & I Holdings–owned stores in Japan, which are 7-Eleven convenience stores, Denny's restaurants, and Ito-Yokado merchandise stores. In addition, Nanaco can be used at more than 7,000 third party stores outside the company's group, like Sogo and Seibu Department Stores

Nanaco cards can be instantly issued at all 7-Eleven convenience stores in Japan, after completing an application form. It is similar to other point based loyalty cards as users can earn points and use them for purchases or discounts.

As of March 2016, 45 million nanaco cards have been issued, and 215,300 stores accept nanaco payment.

== History ==
- April 23, 2007 – pilot program launched at 1,500 7-Eleven stores in Tokyo
- May 2007 – service is expanded nationwide at all 7-Eleven stores
- September 3, 2007 – Nanaco card charging service begins at Seven Bank ATMs
- October 10, 2007 – 5 million cards distributed
- February 2008 – Nanaco cards accepted at all Denny's restaurants
- March 25, 2008 – Nanaco cards accepted at Ito-Yokado stores
- June 1, 2008 – Credit card charging service starts for IY Card branded credit cards (later renamed as Seven Card)
- March 30, 2010 – Nanaco cards accepted at Coca-Cola multi-money vending machines
- March 31, 2010 – 10 million cards distributed
- April 18, 2014 – The number of monthly transactions exceeded 100 million

Supplied by IY Card Service Co., Ltd. (later renamed Seven Card Service Co., Ltd.), a subsidiary of Seven & I Holdings Co., Ltd., Nanaco is available as Nanaco card (plastic card) and Nanaco mobile (Osaifu-Keitai application for mobile phones with embedded contactless chip). The Nanaco format also features a postpay function (on the QUICPay scheme), which was made available to IY Card (since renamed "Seven Card") credit card holders since the summer of 2007. Purchases with Nanaco earn points, which can later be used to make more purchases. The cards uses Sony's FeliCa technology, which is also used in a wide variety of contactless smart cards including Suica, Edy, and Pasmo. Services began on April 23, 2007, and the number of members is more than 3.8 million as of end-June 2007.

"Nana" means "seven" in Japanese, and the giraffe's head and neck is in the shape of the number "7", in reference to "7-Eleven" and "Seven & i Holdings".

The "Nanaco card" issued by Seven-Eleven Japan became the most frequently used e-wallet within three months after it was introduced in April 2007.
