= Softcard =

US mobile payment joint venture

JVL Ventures, LLC
- Trade name: Softcard
- Formerly: Isis Wallet
- Type: Private
- Industry: Mobile Commerce
- Founded: November 16, 2010 in New York City, New York
- Founder: AT&T Mobility, T-Mobile USA and Verizon Wireless
- Defunct: March 31, 2015
- Fate: Assets acquired by Google
- Successors: Google Wallet; Android Pay
- Headquarters: New York City, New York, United States
- Area served: United States, Worldwide
- Key people: Michael Abbott (CEO)
- Services: Mobile commerce
- Owner: Google
- Website: gosoftcard.com

JVL Ventures, LLC d/b/a Softcard (formerly Isis Mobile Wallet), was a joint venture between AT&T, T-Mobile and Verizon which produced a mobile payments platform known as Softcard, which used near-field communication (NFC) technology to allow users to pay for items at stores and restaurants with credit and debit card credentials stored on their smartphones. The partnership was first announced on November 16, 2010; following a trial period in 2012, the service officially launched nationwide on November 14, 2013. The official Softcard app was available for NFC-compatible smartphones using the Android operating system and later on Windows Phone 8.1.

On February 23, 2015, it was announced that Google—which had developed a competing system known as Google Wallet, backed by Sprint and MetroPCS—had acquired certain assets and intellectual property from Softcard. The Softcard service was discontinued on March 31, 2015, and the three founding carriers pledged support for Google Wallet. In May 2015, Google unveiled Android Pay as a successor to Google Wallet and Softcard.

== History ==
In November 2010, AT&T, T-Mobile, and Verizon officially announced a joint venture known as Isis, which planned to develop a near-field communications-based mobile payments platform. The venture also announced partnerships with Discover Financial for access to its point-of-service network, and Barclaycard as a card issuer. The company stated that it planned to "introduce its service in key geographic markets during the next 18 months". The three carriers announced plans to invest more than $100 million in the project.

The service originally planned to operate as a payment system that would handle its own transactions, but citing rapidly developing competition, Isis changed its model to integrate with existing credit cards and payment networks. On July 19, 2011, Isis announced that American Express, MasterCard, and Visa would additionally back the platform. Isis planned to launch a trial program in Salt Lake City and Austin in early to mid 2012.

In September 2011, Isis announced that HTC, LG Electronics, Motorola Mobility, Samsung Electronics, Research in Motion, and Sony Ericsson had committed to manufacturing smartphones that would be compatible with the system. It also announced a partnership with DeviceFidelity to manufacture NFC-enabling accessories for other devices so that they could support Isis. In February 2012, Isis announced Barclaycard, Capital One, and Chase as launch bank partners for the service.

Isis soft-launched in Austin and Salt Lake City on October 22, 2012, and launched nationwide on November 14, 2013.

In September 2014, the service was renamed "Softcard", as the name "Isis" had gained negative connotations due to its perceived association with the terrorist organization the Islamic State, often called the Islamic State of Iraq and Syria, and/or abbreviated to ISIS.

=== Google acquisition, discontinuation ===
On February 23, 2015, Google announced that it would acquire certain assets and intellectual property from Softcard, and integrate it into its own service, Google Wallet. At the same time, it was announced that AT&T, T-Mobile US, and Verizon would begin to back Google Wallet, and bundle its app with their compatible devices later in the year, in place of Softcard. The partnership aimed to build a stronger competitor to the competing mobile payment platform Apple Pay, which was introduced alongside the launch of the iPhone 6 in late 2014, and experienced heavier adoption than other competing services due to Apple's position in the market. Softcard CEO Michael Abbott had previously indicated that the company was "actively working" with Apple to integrate its service with the device. Google Wallet was also backed by Sprint and MetroPCS.

All three carriers had previously worked together in a standard setting environment without including Google Wallet; Verizon refused to allow its devices to access the service because it requires access to the "secure element" of a smartphone, despite Softcard having the same requirement.

The Softcard service and apps ceased to function on March 31, 2015. Softcard customer data was not migrated to Google Wallet, and the service does not support Windows Phone. At Google's I/O developers' conference that May, the company unveiled a replacement for both services known as Android Pay.

== Technologies ==
Softcard used several underlying technologies:

- C-Sam, mobile wallet platform
- Gemalto, mobile commerce platform
