= Osaifu-Keitai =

Japanese mobile payment system

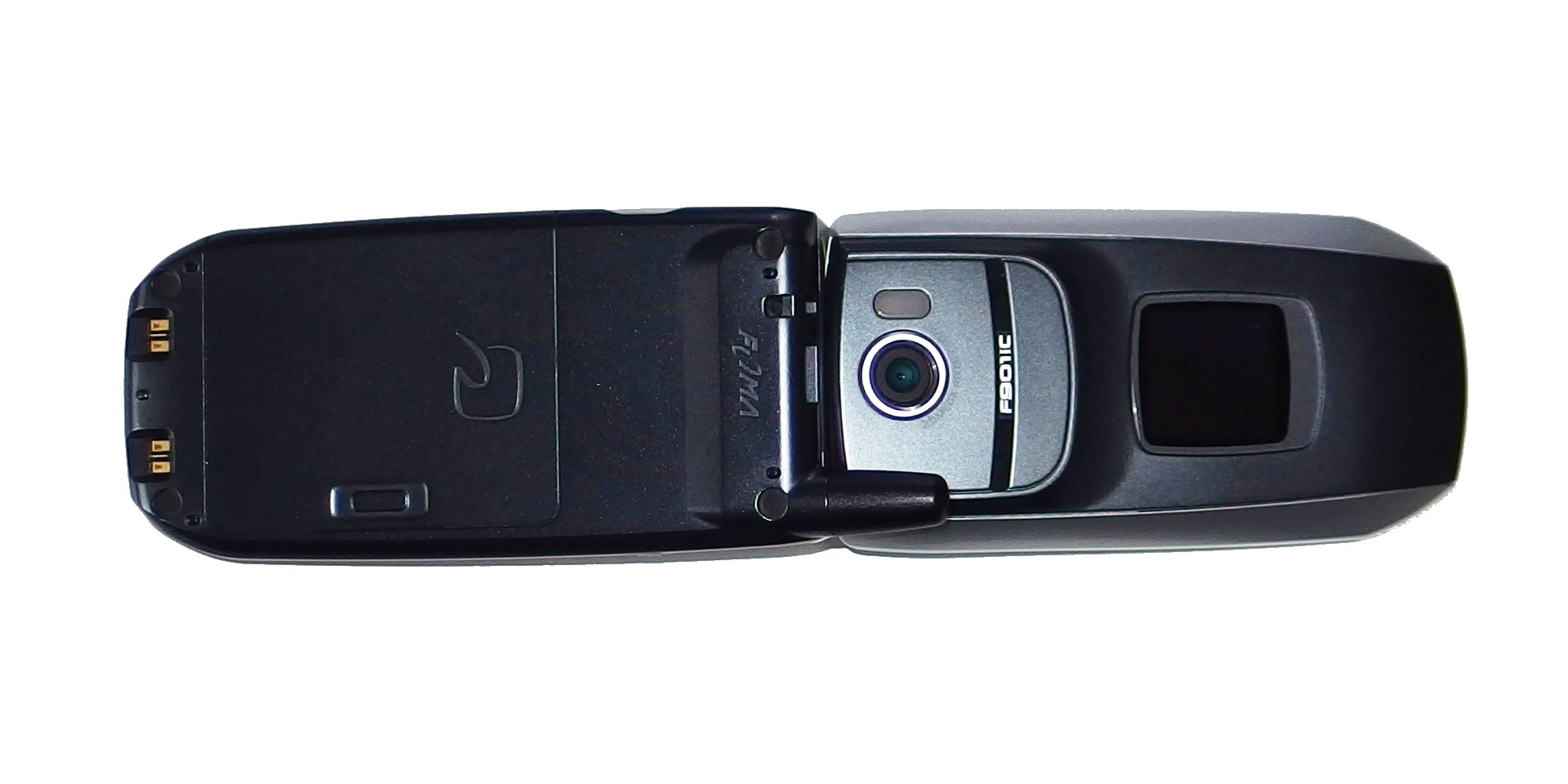
Osaifu-Keitai compliant mobile phone from NTT Docomo

Osaifu-Keitai (おサイフケータイ, Osaifu-Kētai), which means "Wallet Mobile", is the standard mobile payment system in Japan. Osaifu-Keitai services include electronic money, identity card, loyalty card, fare collection of public transits (including railways, buses, and airplanes), or credit card. The term "Osaifu-Keitai" itself is a registered trademark of NTT Docomo.

The system was developed by NTT Docomo who released it to the public in 2004 but the system is also supported by other mobile phone operators. It uses Sony's Mobile FeliCa ICs.

== Operators ==
- NTT docomo Group: i-mode FeliCa
- KDDI (au/Okinawa Cellular): EZ FeliCa
- SoftBank Mobile: S! FeliCa
- Willcom: WILLCOM IC Service

== Advantages ==
FeliCa, developed by Sony, is the standard technology used for Japanese smart cards. Many of these cards accept Osaifu-Keitai (Mobile FeliCa) system as well, or plan to accept it in the future. Osaifu-Keitai can provide more convenient services than plastic FeliCa cards. For instance, it can automatically recharge itself via the Internet, or provide the latest information. It can also be used as a ticket for an airplane or an event, by downloading an electronic ticket. Unlike plastic cards, a single Osaifu-Keitai phone may accept multiple applications, each equivalent to different cards.

== Disadvantages ==
Osaifu-Keitai provides many functions on a single mobile phone. Therefore, there is a great risk if the phone is lost, broken, or stolen. Osaifu-Keitai basically functions even without radio transmissions, so the applications can not be terminated just by closing a phone account. A user has to contact each service provider to stop all the functions. There are some phones that can lock the functions via a phone call or an E-mail.

Since Osaifu-Keitai can function as identity card (such as member card, company card, or keycard), there is also a risk for those who authenticate it.

== Services ==
| Name | Provider | Function | Introduction | | |
| Name | Provider | Function | NTT DoCoMo | au | SoftBank |
|---|---|---|---|---|---|
| Edy | Rakuten Edy | Electronic money | July 10, 2004 | September 9, 2005 | November 11, 2005 |
| ANA Mobile AMC Appli | All Nippon Airways | Member card, airplane ticket | July 10, 2004 | September 9, 2005 | November 11, 2005 |
| club ap Appli | ampm | Member card | July 10, 2004 | Works as a card without application | |
| eLIO Mobile Service | Sony Finance | Credit card | July 10, 2004 | December, 2005 | － |
| Sega Mobile Friends | Sega | Member card | July 10, 2004 | September 15, 2005 | November 11, 2005 |
| Bic Point Kinō-tsuki Kētai (Bic Point Function Mobile) | Bic Camera | Member card | July 10, 2004 | January 12, 2006 | January 18, 2006 |
| vit Appli | TŌHŌ Cinemas | Event ticket | July 10, 2004 | － | － |
| Mobile J-WAVE PASS | J-Wave | Event ticket | July 10, 2004 | － | － |
| club DAM MEMBERS Appli | Daiichikōshō | Member card | July 10, 2004 | － | － |
| JAL IC Service | Japan Airlines | Member card, airplane ticket | January 11, 2005 | － | － |
| Gold Point Card | Yodobashi Camera | Member card | August 30, 2004 | September 9, 2005 | November 11, 2005 |
| Matsukiyo Point Appli | Matsumoto Kiyoshi | Member card | September 4, 2004 | March 23, 2006 | December 2, 2006 |
| Cmode (Shīmo2) | Coca-Cola (Japan) | Electronic money | September 24, 2004 | November 30, 2006 | April 2, 2007 |
| GEO Mobile Member Card | GEO | Member card | November 15, 2004 | October 14, 2005 | November 16, 2005 |
| Kazapon | FeliCa Networks | Information download | November 15, 2004 | Accepts | － |
| kesaka Service | KESAKA System | Keycard | November 22, 2004 | － | May, 2006 |
| Smartplus (VISA TOUCH) | Mitsubishi UFJ NICOS | Credit card | December 22, 2004 | September 15, 2005 | February 1, 2006 |
| FeliCa Pocket Mobile | Sony | Member card | Accepts | － | － |
| Toku Toku Pocket | NEC | Member card | April 1, 2005 | October, 2005 | February 15, 2006 |
| QUICPay Mobile | Japan Credit Bureau | Credit card | April 4, 2005 | September 9, 2005 | February 15, 2006 |
| Edy Charge Appli | eBank | Electronic money | May 15, 2005 | October 17, 2005 | Accepts |
| Plus Mobile for Edy-Style | CYBIRD | Member card | June 6, 2005 | Accepts | － |
| TOWNPOCKET | Techfirm | Member card | August 8, 2005 | September, 2005 | November 11, 2005 |
| Mobile e-card | Iyo Railway | Public fare collection | August 23, 2005 | － | － |
| Hawks IC Ticket | Fukuoka SoftBank Hawks Marketing | Event ticket | August 29, 2005 | － | March 29, 2006 |
| ToruCa | NTT DoCoMo | Coupon ticket | November 11, 2005 | － | － |
| iD | NTT DoCoMo | Credit card | December 1, 2005 | － | － |
| Mobile Nagasaki Smart Card | Public transit operators in Nagasaki | Public fare collection | December 12, 2005 | － | － |
| Mobile Suica | East Japan Railway Company | Public fare collection, electronic money | January 28, 2006 | January 28, 2006 | December 2, 2006 |
| Mobile NicoPa | Shinki Bus | Public fare collection | February 1, 2006 | － | － |
| Okudake Ninshō | BIGLOBE | User authentication | February 27, 2006 | February 27, 2006 | February 27, 2006 |
| MoCoCa | NTT Business Associe | Keycard | March 8, 2006 | － | － |
| χsmart | NTT Telecon | Office authentication | April 1, 2006 | － | － |
| WonderGOO Mobile Member Card | WonderCorporation | Member card | Accepts | Accepts | Accepts |
| au Kētai Coupon | KDDI | Coupon ticket | － | January 16, 2007 | － |
| nanaco Mobile | Seven & I Holdings | Electronic money | April 10, 2007 | April 12, 2007 | September 12, 2007 |
| Gurunavi Touch | Gourmet Navigator (Gurunavi) | Coupon ticket | September 3, 2007 | September 3, 2007 | September 3, 2007 |
| Mobile WAON | Aeon | Electronic money | November 5, 2007 | March 1, 2008 | March 1, 2008 |
| Tacchan | ipoca | Coupon ticket | February 1, 2008 | February 1, 2008 | February 1, 2008 |
| McDonald's | THE JV | Coupon ticket | May 1, 2008 | May 1, 2008 | May 1, 2008 |
| Kazashite stamp | Large hill | Member card | June 23, 2008 | June 1, 2009 | April 1, 2009 |
| Rakuten app | Rakuten | Member card | July 8, 2008 | July 8, 2008 | July 8, 2008 |
| T Point app | CCC | Member card | October 14, 2008 | February 5, 2009 | February 2, 2009 |
| Touch Suite | Lady bug | Member card | March 25, 2009 | March 25, 2009 | March 25, 2009 |
| Moba han | Kanko maru | Member card | March 1, 2010 | March 1, 2010 | March 1, 2010 |
| e-AMUSEMENT | Konami | User authentication | November 11, 2010 | November 11, 2010 | November 11, 2010 |
| Ponta | Lawson | Member card | July 15, 2011 | July 15, 2011 | July 15, 2011 |
| Mobile Starbucks card | Starbucks coffee Japan | Electronic money | March 26, 2014 | March 26, 2014 | March 26, 2014 |

== See also ==
- Mobile payment
- Electronic money
- FeliCa
