= Google Pay (mobile app) =

Mobile payment application

- Developer: Google
- Release: September 18, 2017; 9 years ago (as Tez)
- Operating system: Android, iOS
- Predecessor: Tez (India)
- Successor: Google Wallet (U.S.)
- Type: Mobile payment app
- License: Proprietary
- Website: https://pay.google.com/intl/en_in/about/

Google Pay is a mobile payment application developed by Google. It allows users to make payments via smartphones using methods such as the Unified Payments Interface (UPI) in India and PayNow in Singapore. The app supports peer-to-peer (P2P) transfers, in-store payments via NFC, online purchases, and bill payments.

== History ==
=== Tez and rebranding ===
Google Pay was originally launched in India as Tez in September 2017, built on the UPI system. In August 2018, it was rebranded as Google Pay to unify Google's payment platforms across global markets. The new app retained UPI features while adding broader payment capabilities.

=== Expansion ===
After success in India, Google Pay expanded to countries including Singapore and the United States. A revamped app was launched in the U.S. in 2020 but was later discontinued in June 2024 in favor of Google Wallet. As of May 2026, the app remains active in India and Singapore.

== Features ==
=== NFC and QR payments ===
Google Pay supports QR code payments and NFC-based contactless transactions in supported regions. In Singapore, QR payments are enabled through PayNow and FavePay. In India, Google Pay allows NFC-based Tap & Pay using RuPay credit/debit cards linked with the app.

=== Peer-to-peer (P2P) transfers ===
Users can send or receive money from contacts. In India, this is powered by UPI, and in Singapore by PayNow.

=== UPI integration (India) ===
Google Pay in India operates on the UPI infrastructure, enabling instant money transfers between linked bank accounts. Users can pay using UPI IDs, QR codes, or mobile numbers.

Several related features were introduced in 2024: the UPI Circle feature allows a user to delegate payment access to trusted secondary users with either full or partial control, UPI vouchers let users send prepaid monetary value via mobile numbers, redeemable even without linking a bank account, and Autopay for UPI Lite tops up a user's UPI Lite balance when it falls below a set threshold for small-value offline transactions. Users can add prepaid utility services like electricity or maintenance bills and recharge them directly from the app.

Google Pay supports international UPI QR payments, allowing Indian tourists to pay local Singaporean merchants directly via UPI without currency exchange.

=== ClickPay QR (India) ===
Google Pay supports ClickPay QR for bill payments by scanning QR codes generated by billers through NPCI Bharat BillPay.

=== PayNow integration (Singapore) ===
In Singapore, the app integrates with PayNow, allowing users to send and receive funds via mobile numbers or NRIC/FIN.

=== FavePay integration (Singapore) ===
In partnership with Fave, Google Pay supports cashback-enabled QR payments via the SGQR system at various retail outlets.

== Security ==
Google Pay uses device-level security such as PIN, fingerprint, or face unlock. Transactions are encrypted, and the app employs machine learning-based fraud monitoring to detect suspicious activity.

== Availability ==
As of 2024, Google Pay is available in the following countries:

- India Full UPI support and features.
- Singapore PayNow, FavePay, and international UPI acceptance.

The Google Pay app was formerly available in the United States, but was phased out in June 2024 in favor of Google Wallet.

== See also ==
- Google Pay (payment method)
- Google Wallet
- Unified Payments Interface
- PayNow
- FavePay
- National Payments Corporation of India
