= Fave (company) =

Malaysian fintech company

- Type: Privately held
- Industry: Fintech
- Predecessor: KFit
- Founded: April 2015
- Founders: Joel Neoh; Chen Chow
- Headquarters: Malaysia
- Website: Official website

Fave, incorporated as Fave Asia Sdn Bhd, is a Malaysian fintech company. Started in 2015 as KFit, a subscription-based fitness platform, it pivoted into Fave after the purchases of Groupon's, Indonesian, Malaysian, and Singaporean operations in 2016.

== History ==
Joel Neoh, the founder of Groupsmore in Malaysia, which was eventually acquired by Groupon and morphed into Groupon Malaysia, started KFit in 2015 after he left Groupon Malaysia. Launched in April 2015, KFit was a subscription-based fitness application that gave their subscribers access to different gyms, yoga studios, and other fitness locations. Their subscribers would pay a fixed rate to KFit while KFit would in return pay out a variable amount to their partnering fitness locations for their member's usage. By September 2015, KFit had presence in Melbourne, Sydney, Auckland, Singapore, Seoul, Taipei and Kuala Lumpur.

In February 2016, KFit raised US$12 million in Series A round led by Sequoia Capital, Venturra Capital, SIG, and Axiata Digital Innovation Fund. In March, it acquired its competitor in Singapore, PassportAsia. In March, June, and November, KFit would go on to acquire Groupon's Singpaorean, Malaysian and Indonesian operations respectively.

The business model had a flaw: the growth in fixed-rate users was outpacing that of the utilisation of the platform, KFit would have to pay out to their partnering venues more than what they could collect from the individual subscribers. To stop their losses, by June 2016, KFit increased the subscription rates as well as putting a limit on the number of sessions that a user can booked in a month.

In July 2016, KFit launched a separate app, Fave, which targeted at people looking for deals for food, activities, and fitness. By the end of 2016, KFit's offering would eventually be integrated into the Fave app. In 2018, it raised US$20 million in its series B round.

In 2021, the company would be acquired by Pine Labs, a fintech company for US$45 million.

In February 2023, Neoh stepped down from his role as the CEO, handing over the leadership of the company to Chen Chow, the chief operating officer and a co-founder of the company. In April, Fave exited from the Indonesian market, while offloading some of its services to Pine Labs and other sister companies.
