= Diamond City (shopping centers) =

Japanese retailer

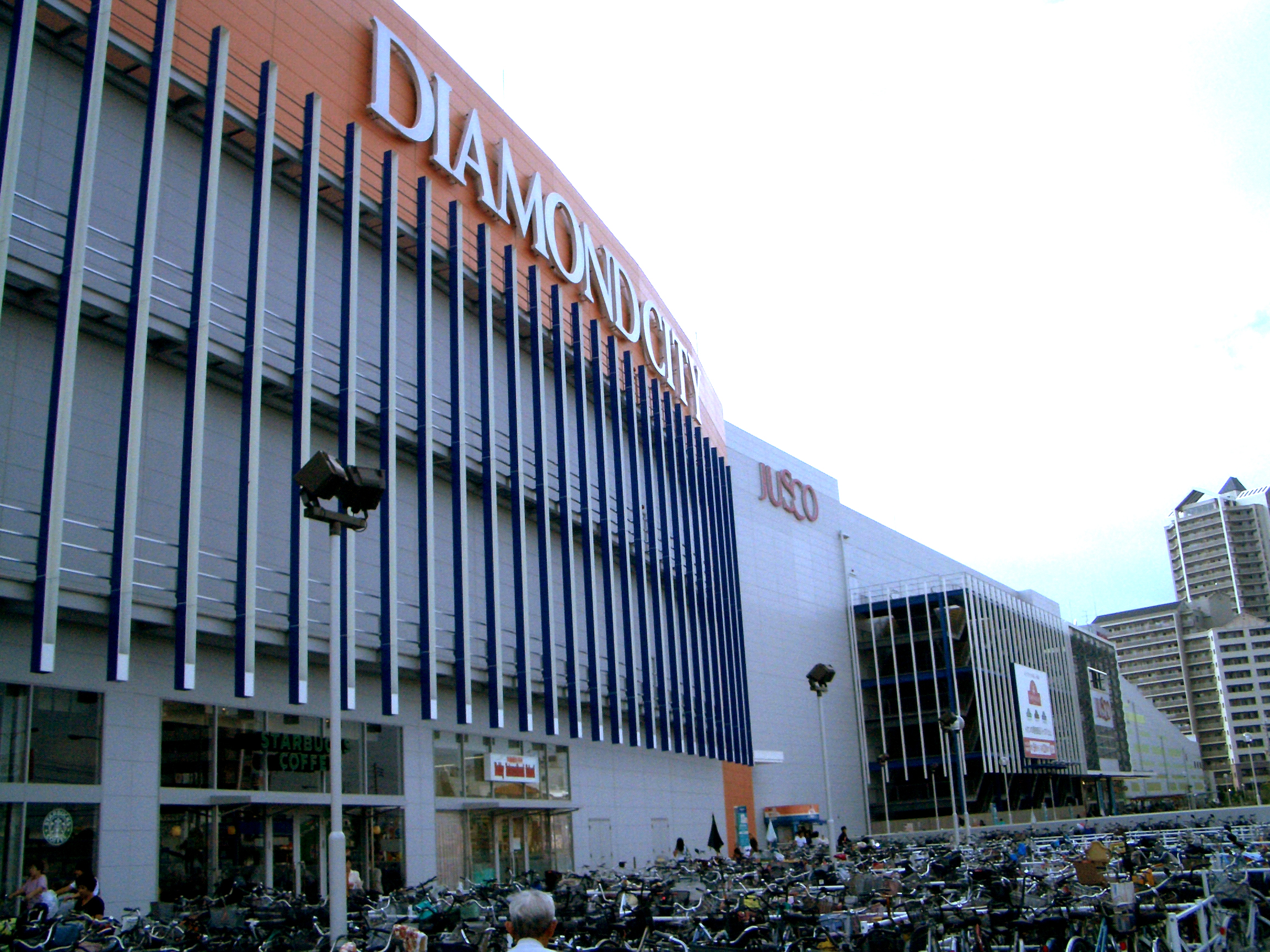
Diamond City Prou in Sakai in 2005

Diamond City was a chain of over 14 shopping centers located throughout the nation of Japan. Diamond City shopping centers were owned and operated by Diamond City Co., Ltd.

Diamond City Co., Ltd. had been in operation since 1969. The company was merged into Æon Group in August 2008.
