= Edy =

Japanese electronic money system

Pre-2012 Edy logo

Edy, provided by Rakuten, Inc. in Japan is a prepaid rechargeable contactless smart card. While the name derives from euro, dollar, and yen, it works with yen only.

== History ==
Edy was launched on January 18, 2001, by BitWallet, with financing primarily from Sony, in addition to then other companies, including NTT Docomo and the Sumitomo Group.

NTT Docomo's i-mode mobile payment service Osaifu-Keitai, which launched on 10 July 2004, included support for BitWallet's Edy. In 2005, over a million payments had been made with the service.

On 18 April 2006, Intel announced a five billion yen (approx. US$45 million, or 35 million euros as of May 20, 2006) investment in bitWallet, aimed at furthering its usage on computers.

On 1 June 2012, Rakuten acquired Edy, changing the official name to RakutenEdy and the parent company from bitWallet to RakutenEdy Inc. The three-oval blue-tone logo was changed to the Rakuten logo and the font of the word 'Edy' was altered.

== Mobile phones ==
Edy can be used on Osaifu-Keitai featured cellphones. Makers of these phones include major cell phone carriers such as docomo, au and SoftBank. The phones can be used physically like an Edy card, and online Edy features can be accessed from the phones as well, such as the ability to charge an Edy account.

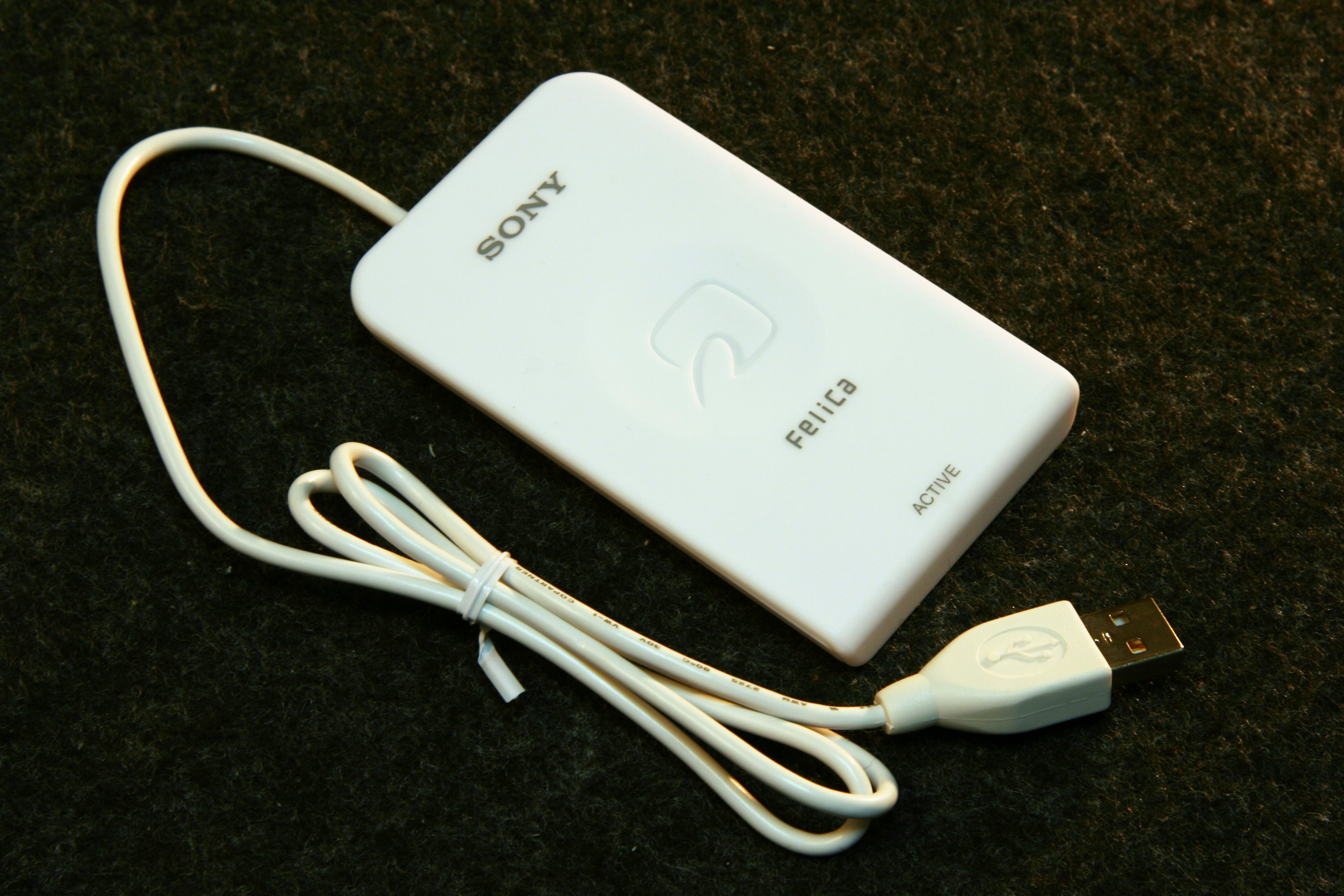
PaSoRi reader/writer used for Edy
