= Contactless payment =

Technology enabling payment without physical contact

EMV contactless symbol used on compatible payment terminals. EMV stands for "Europay, Mastercard, and Visa", the three companies that standardised secure payment cards.

Contactless payment systems are credit cards and debit cards, key fobs, smart cards, or other devices, including smartphones and other mobile devices, that use radio-frequency identification (RFID) or near-field communication (NFC) for making secure payments. The embedded integrated circuit chip and antenna enable consumers to wave their card, fob, or handheld device over a reader at the point-of-sale terminal. Contactless payments are made in close physical proximity, unlike other types of mobile payments which use broad-area cellular or Wi-Fi networks and do not involve close physical proximity.

EMV (abbreviation for Europay, Mastercard, and Visa) is a common standard used by major credit card and smartphone companies for use in general commerce. Contactless smart cards that function as stored-value cards are popular for use as transit system farecards, such as the Oyster card (London, UK) or RioCard (Rio de Janeiro, Brazil). These can often store non-currency value (such as monthly passes), in additional to fare value purchased with cash or electronic payment.

Apple Pay on iPhones and Google Pay on Android mobile phones are common forms of contactless payments used. These types of payments use tokenization which encapsulates a card issuer's details within the mobile phone.

Some suppliers claim that transactions can be almost twice as fast as a conventional cash, credit, or debit card purchase. Because no signature or PIN verification is typically required, contactless purchases are usually limited to small value sales. Lack of authentication provides a window during which fraudulent purchases can be made while the card owner is unaware of the card's loss. Major financial institutions and multinational corporations now offer contactless payment systems to customers as contactless credit cards have become widespread in the US, UK, Japan, Germany, Canada, Australia, France, the Netherlands, etc., as consumers are likely to spend more money using their cards due to the ease of small transactions. With contactless cards growing in numbers and percentages of adoption, the number of payments by this method had increased significantly since the spending limit was raised. Purchases made by card now surpass those made by cash and account for approximately one-third of all card transactions in countries like the UK. Contactless payments specifically have become increasingly popular, accounting for 4 out of 5 point-of-sale credit card purchases in Australia as of 2019. Card issuers indicate that they will increase the availability of contactless cards to consumers. As of October 2021 there are over 142 million contactless-enabled cards and over 147,000 terminals in use in the UK alone. Visa estimated that there would be 300 million contactless cards issued in the US by the end of 2020, up from the predicted 100 million at the end of 2019.

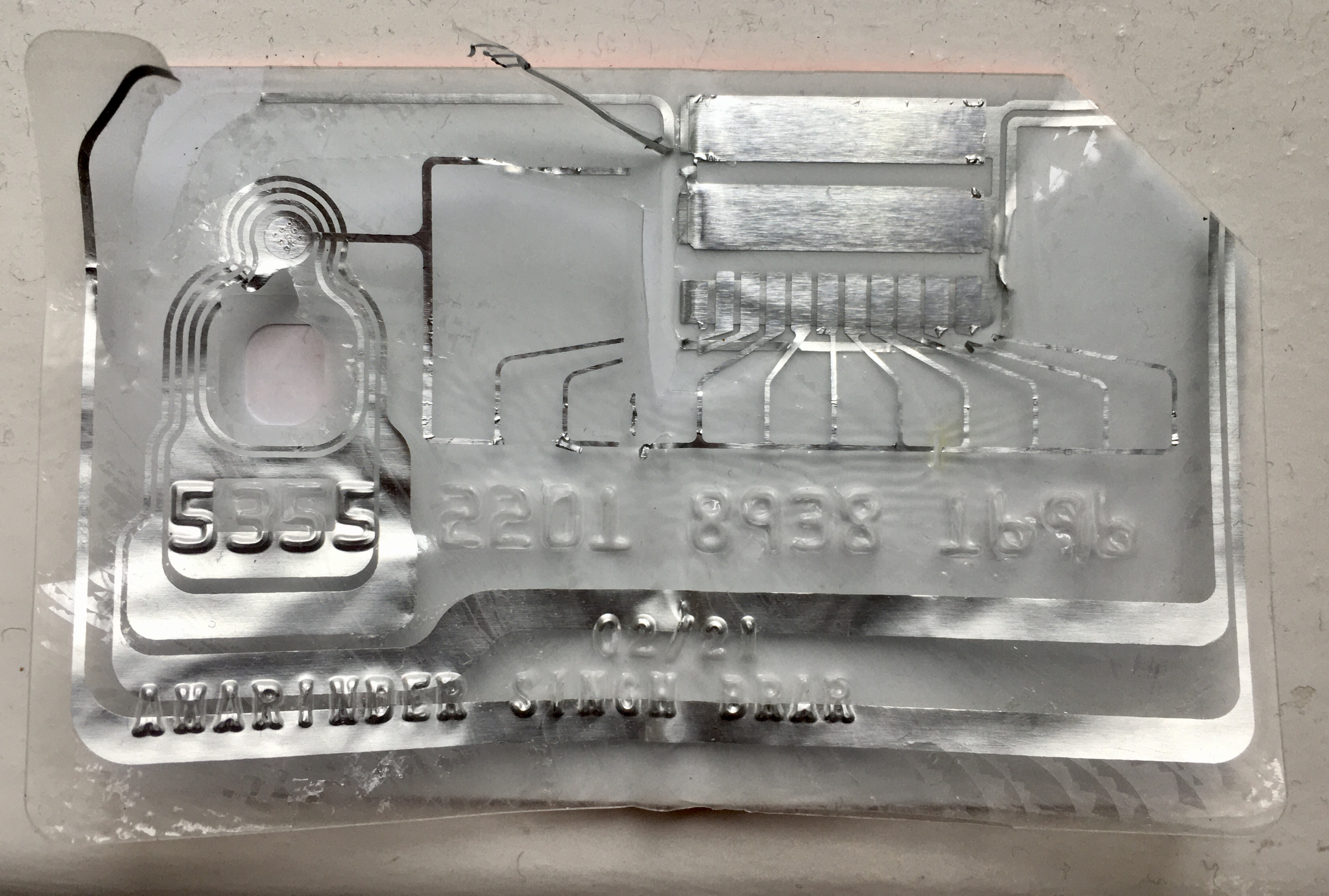
Image of Contactless Card, opened up

== History ==
=== 1990s–2000s ===
Mobil was one of the most notable early adopters of a similar technology, and offered their "Speedpass" contactless payment system for participating Mobil gas stations as early as 1997. Octopus card was launched in the same year in Hong Kong for fare payment on public transports, with over three millions cards issued in the first three months. Freedompay also had early wins in the contactless space with Bank of America and McDonald's.

In 2002, Philips teamed up with Sony to elaborate the NFC standard. Then Philips Semiconductors applied for the six fundamental patents of NFC, invented by the Austrian and French engineers Franz Amtmann and Philippe Maugars who received the European Inventor Award in 2015.

In July 2004, Sony, who had implemented the contactless RFID smart card FeliCa in Japan, introduced the Osaifu-Keitai (おサイフケータイ) system (literal translation: "wallet-phone") developed with the mobile phone operator NTT DoCoMo on multiple FeliCa systems such as Edy and, on 28 January 2006, on Mobile Suica used primarily on the railway networks owned by JR East.

In May 2005, after some experimentation in the Netherlands, the contactless deferred payment at the end of each month, after the registration of the trips aboard with a contactless mobile phone on the client's account, was first experimented in Germany during 6 months on the tramways and bus of Hanau with the Nokia 3220 using the NFC standard of Philips and Sony.

In October 2005, the immediate contactless payment was first experimented in France in Caen during 6 months with a Samsung NFC smartphone by Orange in collaboration with Philips Semiconductors in the Cofinoga shops (Galeries Lafayette, Monoprix) and Vinci parkings. For the first time, thanks to "Fly Tag", the system allowed to receive as well audiovisual informations, like bus timetables or cinema trailers from the concerned services. In June 2007, the payment with a contactless bank card was tested at the FNAC of La Défense in Paris and from 19 November 2007 to 2009 in some shops of Caen and Strasbourg, this time with smartphones NFC, provided by four operators (Orange, Bouygues Telecom, SFR and NRJ Mobile). On 5 November 2007, Orange and the transport societies SNCF and Keolis associated themselves for a 2 months experimentation with smartphones in Rennes in the metro, bus and TER trains.

The first contactless cards in the UK were issued by Barclaycard in September 2007. PayPass trialed the world's first NFC-enabled phone, the Nokia 6131 NFC, in New York in 2007.

In March 2008, Eat became the first restaurant chain to adopt contactless.

On 19 January 2009, NFC is used in transports for the first time in the world by China Unicom and Yucheng Transportation Card with Changhong DG28 and F4 mobile phones in the tramways and bus of Chongqing in China.

=== 2010s ===
In January 2010, Barclaycard partnered with mobile phone firm Orange, to launch a contactless credit card in the UK. Orange and Barclaycard also announced in 2009 that they would be launching a mobile phone with contactless technology.

After a test conducted from October 2005 to November 2006 with 27 users, on 21 May 2010, the transport authority of Nice Régie Lignes d'Azur was the first public transport provider in Europe to add definitely to its own offer a contactless payment on its tramways and bus network either with a NFC bank card or smartphone application notably on Samsung Player One (with the same mobile phone operators than in Caen and Strasbourg in 2007), as well as the validation aboard with them of the transport titles and the loading of these titles onto the smartphone, in addition to the season tickets contactless card. This service was as well experimented then respectively implemented for NFC smartphones on 18 and 25 June 2013 in the tramways and bus of Caen and Strasbourg, after the contactless payment on the 765 pay and display parking machines of Strasbourg was made available in October 2011. In the Paris transport network, after a 4 months testing from November 2006 with Bouygues Telecom and 43 persons and finally with 8,000 users from July 2018, the contactless mobile payment and direct validation on the turnstile readers with a smartphone was adopted on 25 September 2019 in collaboration with the societies Orange, Samsung, Wizway Solutions, Worldline and Conduent.

NFC is used in Seoul after its introduction in South Korea by the discount retailer Homeplus in March 2010 and in Tokyo it is tested then adopted or added to the existing systems, like the mobile wallet Osaifu-Keitai, from May 2010 to end of 2012. The NFC standard is implemented for the first time in a metro network, by China Unicom in Beijing on 31 December 2010.

In October 2011, the first mobile phones with Mastercard PayPass and/or Visa payWave certification appeared. A PayPass or payWave account can be assigned to the embedded secure element and/or SIM card within the phones.

In October 2013, Citi Enterprise Payments and 3 Hong Kong, the mobile operation of Hutchison Telecommunications Hong Kong Holdings Limited (SEHK: 215), jointly announced the launch of '3 Citi Wallet.' Using Near Field Communication (NFC) technology, the '3 Citi Wallet' was a multi-purpose mobile wallet service that included mobile payment, transaction history, a location-based special offer service and a search function that directed customers to the best deals within their vicinity. The 3Citi wallet was compatible with a wide range of designated smartphones, from Samsung, Sony, HTC, LG and iPhone. Over 9,000 Visa payWave readers across Hong Kong were able to accept contactless payments on Day 1.

In February 2014, Mastercard announced that it would partner with Weve, which is a joint venture between EE, O2, and Vodafone UK, to focus on mobile payments. The partnership will promote the development of "contactless mobile payment systems" by creating a universal platform in Europe for it.

On 9 September 2014, Apple Inc. announced Apple Pay, a proprietary form of contactless payment integrated with its smartphones, with the release of the iPhone 6.

In September 2014, Transport for London's Tube began accepting contactless payment. The number of completed contactless journeys has now exceeded 300m. On Friday 18 December, the busiest single day in 2015, a record 1.24m journeys were completed by over 500k unique contactless cards.

In 2016 Erste Group launched an NFC-only debit card implemented as a sticker in Austria. It can be used at any NFC supporting terminal for transactions of unlimited amount however for transactions over the floor limit of €25 a PIN is required to confirm the transaction.

In 2016, contactless payments start to become even broader with wearable technology devices also offering this payment feature.

=== 2020s ===
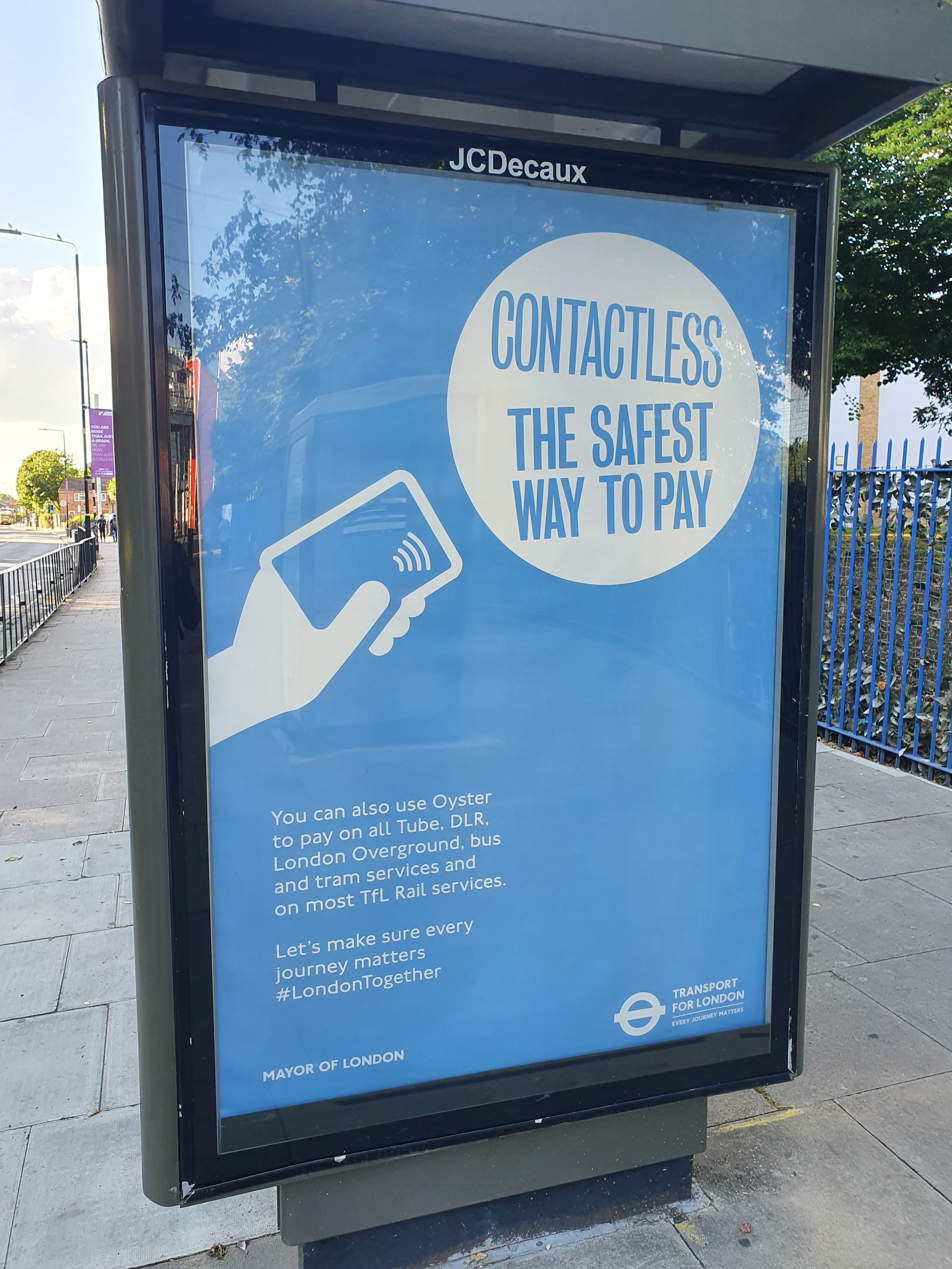
A Transport for London bus stop advertisement recommending contactless payment as safe during the COVID-19 pandemic.

During the COVID-19 pandemic, several banks raised their contactless payment limits. In the United Kingdom, the limit was increased from £30 to £45 in March 2020. Contactless payments were recommended as a safer payment method compared to Chip and PIN card payments and cash transactions. It was later raised to £100.

In 2022, Apple Inc. announced Tap to Pay, a feature which allows merchants to use iPhone devices as payment terminals for contactless cards.

== Adoption and usage ==
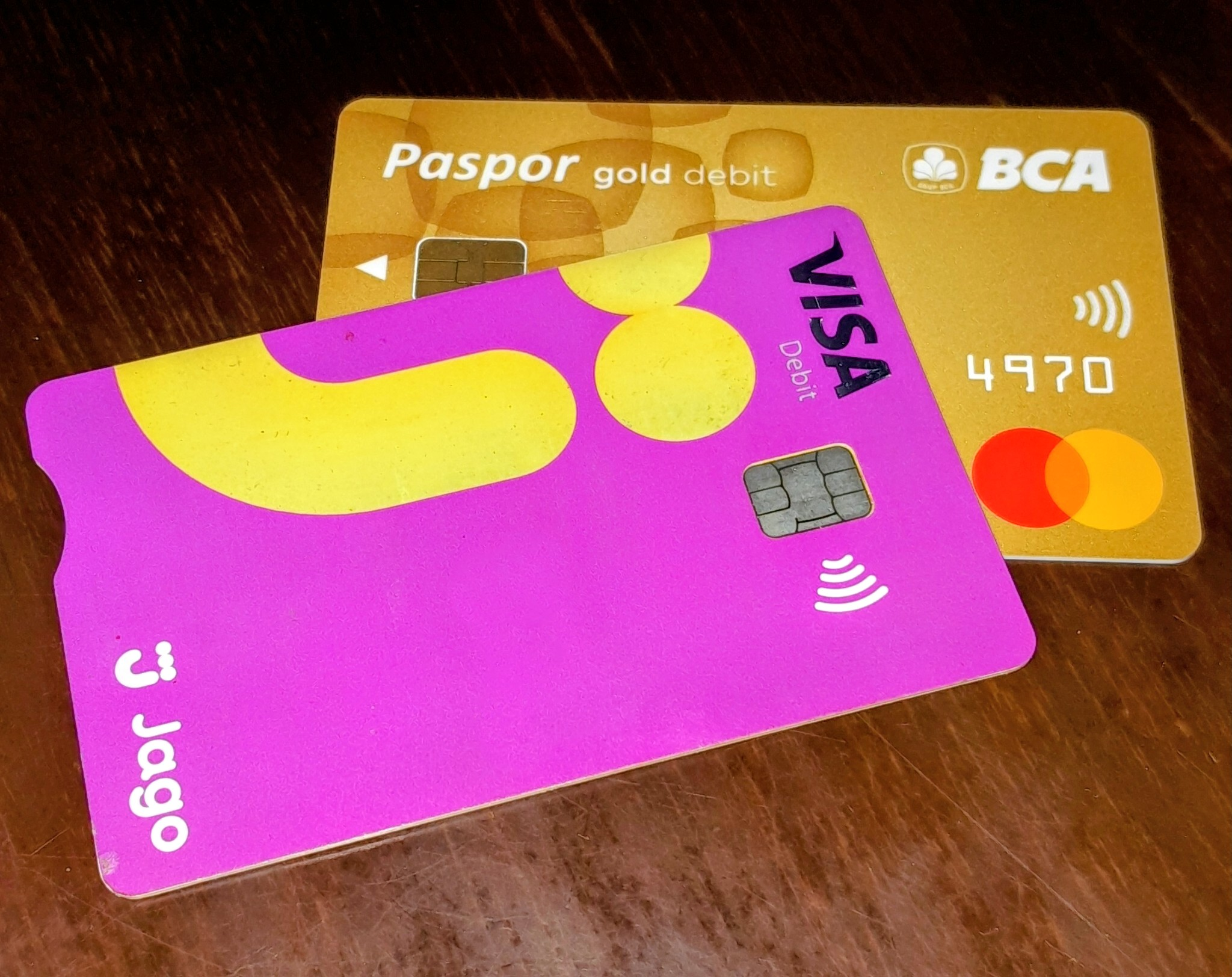
Debit cards with EMV Contactless, one is Visa payWave and the other is Mastercard Contactless

Google Pay is an application for devices running Google's Android OS, which allows users to make purchases using NFC, which initially required a physical secure element but this was replaced by host card emulation which was introduced in Android 4.4 (KitKat). Softcard (formerly known as Isis mobile wallet), Cityzi and Quick Tap wallets for example, use a secure SIM card to store encrypted personal information. Contactless payments with enabled mobile phones still occur on a small scale, but every month an increasing number of mobile phones are certified.

In 2012, Mastercard Advisors wrote that consumers are likely to spend more money using their cards due to the ease of small transactions. Mastercard Canada says it has seen "about 25 percent" higher spending by users of its Mastercard Contactless-brand RFID credit cards.

As of December 2014, there were approximately 58 million contactless-enabled cards in use in the UK, and over 147,000 terminals in use. By June 2017 purchases made by card surpassed those made by cash. This was reported to have been driven by the rise in contactless payments, which accounted for approximately one third of all card transactions in the UK. The number of payments by this method had increased significantly since the spending limit was raised from £20 to £30. In 2018, contactless payments made up around 19% of transactions in the UK.

In 2018, the Westpac Banking Corporation in Australia revealed contactless payment statistics from 2017 and claimed in the report that contactless payments approached saturation point by being used in over 90% of purchases. The Australian St.George Bank reported 94.6% usage for the same period.

Recent statements by Visa and other US card issuers indicate that they will increase the availability of contactless cards to US consumers. Visa estimates there will be 300 million contactless cards issued in the US by the end of 2020, up from the predicted 100 million at the end of 2019 as announced on its 2018 Q4 earnings call.

Telecom operators are starting to get involved in contactless payments via the use of NFC-enabled phones. Belgacom's Pingping, for example, has a stored value account and via a partnership with Alcatel-Lucent's Touchatag provides contactless payment functionalities.

Major financial entities now offering contactless payment systems include Mastercard, China UnionPay, Citibank, JPMorgan Chase, American Express, KeyBank, Barclays, Barclaycard, HSBC, Lloyds Banking Group, FreedomPay, RuPay, The Co-operative Bank, Nationwide Building Society and NatWest Group. Visa payWave, Mastercard Contactless, and American Express Expresspay are examples of contactless credit cards which have become widespread in the US and UK.

== Technology ==
There are three main standard usages for contactless payments adopted throughout payment terminals with the EMV standard.

EMV Chip

On issued bank cards a smart chip or cryptographic chip is placed on the card known as a smart card which allows wireless payments to be made from the EMV chip in range of a payment terminal using RFID technology following the EMVCo standard. When the smart card is tapped against a payment terminal that authenticates the card issuer's details through a series of PIN interactions the payment for the interaction will succeed.

Tokenization

A newer approach to smart card technology is achieved by linking a smart card to a hardware device, such as through the Apple Pay application on an iPhone mobile phone, thereby allowing mobile devices the ability to make payments using RFID technology against a payment terminal on behalf of a smart card using a token generated by the card issuer, a process known as tokenization. A Device Account Number (DAN) similar to a Private Account Number (PAN) in traditional payment stripe and chip cards, is generated along with a private key and sent to the card issuer during initial setup of the smart card on the hardware device. When payments are made via the respective approved application on the hardware device the DAN and relevant details such as expiry date and CVV are sent to the card issuer via a payment terminal for cryptography where the associated private key is then used to authorise the transaction.

NFC

The near field communication (NFC, compliant with ISO/IEC 14443 standard) technology in contactless cards uses a 13.56Mhz radio frequency technology that only transmits digital data within a concise range.

Typically the optimum distance is 4 centimetres or less - beyond, the signal is rapidly decreasing and can never exceed 10 centimetres.

== Security ==
In 2006 security researchers found that the cardholder's name, credit card number, and expiration date may be transmitted by contactless payment cards without encryption. They were able to use information leaked from a contactless credit card to make a purchase online, without opening the envelope in which the card was sent.

Depending on the economic space, there may be a payment limit on single transactions without the need to input the PIN, and some contactless cards can only be used a certain number of times before customers are asked for their PIN. Contactless debit and credit transactions use the same chip and PIN network as older cards and are protected by the same fraud guarantees. Where PIN is supported, the contactless part of the card may remain non-functional until a standard chip and PIN transaction has been executed. This provides some verification that the card was delivered to the actual cardholder.

Under fraud guarantee standards, U.S. banks are liable for any fraudulent transactions charged to the contactless cards.

=== CVM limit ===
Because no signature or PIN verification is typically required, contactless purchases are often limited to a maximum amount per transaction, known as a Cardholder Verification Limit (CVM limit). Limits vary between banks. For transactions over the defined CVM limit a verification is usually required (e.g. PIN, signature, or biometric authentication).

Transactions under the floor limit, in addition to not requiring consumer authentication, are also accepted without sending the transaction online for verification by the acquiring host.

Note that these limits typically do not apply when CDCVM verification (such as in Apple Pay) is used.

Economic space	CVM limit	Comment
Argentina	ARS 80000	Transactions above ARS 8000 may require PIN verification.
Australia	A$200	For transactions over A$200 a PIN or biometric authentication is required.
Austria	€25	For transactions exceeding €25 a PIN is required. Additionally for cards produced before 2017 only five transactions can be made without a PIN. Cards issued after December 2016 need a PIN code for transactions over €25 or a contactless total of €125.
Azerbaijan	₼100	For transactions of ₼100 and above using a physical card a PIN is required. There's no mandatory PIN requirement when CDCVM (Apply Pay, Garmin Pay, or Google Pay) is used.
Bahrain	20 BHD	
Bangladesh	BDT5000.00	For transactions over BDT 5000.00 a PIN is required.
Belgium	€50	Since the COVID crisis, transaction limits in Belgium were increased. For transactions over €50 a PIN is required. When several contactless payments in a row reach the amount of €125, the PIN is required.
Brazil	R$200	For transactions over R$200,00 a PIN is required.
Bulgaria	€50	For transactions over €50, a PIN is required. 50 BGN (~€25) until March 25, 2020. 25 BGN (~€12) until April 12, 2019.
Bosnia and Herzegovina	60 KM	For transactions exceeding 60 KM a PIN is required.
Canada	No limit De facto C$250	Limits are completely at the discretion of the merchant's acquiring bank and the consumer's bank. There is no law limiting the amounts. Since 2020, the standard contactless payment limit in Canada has been increased to C$250, with widespread adoption across major card networks and financial institutions.
Chile	$12.000 CLP	
China	CN¥1000	UnionPay QuickPass. PIN required unless disabled with bank.
Colombia	COP 100.000	For transactions over COP 100.000 PIN is required.
Costa Rica	₡30000	For transactions over ₡30000 signature is required. Beginning July 1, 2022, PIN will be required instead.
Croatia	€40	For transactions over €40 PIN is required.
Curaçao	ANG 45	For transactions over ANG 45 a PIN is required. When several contactless payments in a row reach the amount of ANG 100, the PIN is required.
Czech Republic	500 CZK	For transactions over 500 CZK PIN is needed. After 5 consecutive contactless transactions below 500 CZK and/or after reaching the cumulative limit in CZK equal to €150, PIN is required.
Denmark	350 DKK	For transactions over 350 DKK PIN is needed. Sometimes PIN is needed anyway to ensure the card is used by its owner.
Dominican Republic	No limit	
Egypt	EGP 600	Transactions above EGP 600 requires a PIN.
Estonia	€50	
Finland	€50	€25 up until April 12, 2019. After that it will be €50.
France	€50	For contactless cards, up to three times a day, then a PIN is required. CDCVM payments are exempt from this. Merchants may set their own limits.
Germany	€25/€50	For each transaction over €25 or €50 (some Visa cards) a PIN or CDCVM verification is required.
Greece	€50	For transactions over €50 a PIN is required
Hong Kong	No limit	Initially banks, not government, set it for $500 or under, then (for some banks) under $1000 (HKD), until the limits were removed.
Hungary	15000 HUF	For transactions over 5000 HUF PIN is needed. For every 10 consecutive contactless transactions or if you reach 10.000 HUF PIN is needed. Due the COVID-19 pandemic, the 5000 HUF limit is increased to 15 000 HUF. No limit for Apple Pay or similar contactless purchases.
Iceland	ISK 5.000	Íslandsbanki has a lower limit of ISK 4.200. For each transaction over the limit, Chip and PIN are required. Also, a cumulative limit of ISK 10.000 between Chip and PIN uses.
India	₹5000	For transactions above ₹5000, a PIN is required.
Indonesia	Rp1.000.000	Transactions above Rp1.000.000, must require 6-digits PIN authorization.
Ireland	€50	Increased from €30 to €50 on 1 April 2020. There is no transaction limit when using contactless with two-factor authentication (e.g. Apple Pay), although some merchants still apply a €50 transaction limit
Israel	300 ILS	For transactions over 300 ILS PIN is needed
Italy	€50	For transactions over €50 PIN is needed
Japan	JP¥20000	JCB QUICPay and QUICPay+ Under Visa brand rules, the CVM limit for all card transactions is 15,000 yen Under Mastercard brand rules, the CVM limit for contactless IC card transactions is 15,000 yen
Latvia	€50	
Lithuania	€50	
North Macedonia	750 MKD	
Malaysia	RM250	Cumulative limits (total amount and/or consecutive transactions) differ between card issuers. By default, for each transaction above RM250 PIN is required. But the limit is customizable.
Netherlands	€25	For card payments of more than €25 at once or €50 in a row a PIN is required. Some older cards only allow five transactions in a row without a PIN. Most if not all retailers have, by now, terminals that support CDCVM as verification (i.e. Apple Pay). Most banks have had Android NFC/Tap&Pay through their mobile banking apps for a few years now. While Apple Pay was launched (unofficially) by bunq on March 20, 2018, through a workaround, and to be joined officially by ING on June 11, 2019, followed by the official launch for bunq on Sept. 3rd and the announcement that banks ABN AMRO and Rabobank will also start to offer Apple Pay in The Netherlands sometime in 2019. Also note that broad acceptance of credit cards isn't commonplace yet, so that's up to the individual merchant. Maestro by Mastercard is the dominant card type and accepted everywhere.
New Zealand	NZ$200	For each transaction over NZ$200 a PIN is required. In response to the COVID-19 pandemic, this amount was temporarily raised from NZ$80 to NZ$200, in an effort to further reduce unnecessary contact.
Norway	500 NOK	For each transactions over 500 NOK a PIN is required. Sometimes PIN is needed anyway to ensure the card is used by its owner.
Pakistan	Rs 3000	Transactions above Rs 3000 require pin verification.
Philippines	₱5000	Increased from ₱2000 to ₱5000 in 2020.
Poland	100 PLN	For transactions over or equal to 100 PLN PIN is required.
Portugal	€50	For more than €50 PIN verification is mandatory
Romania	100 lei	For transactions over or equal to 100 lei PIN is required.
Russia	₽1000-₽5000	CVM limit ranges from ₽1000 to ₽5000 depending on the acquirer and card payment system (in some cases, the issuer). In the terminals of the largest russian bank, Sberbank, the CVM limit is ₽3000 for all payment systems, this same limit is the most common in Russia. In some terminals of other banks (for example, VTB, Promsvyazbank, Russian Standard Bank), the CVM limit for Mastercard is ₽5000. In NSPC (operator of the national payment system Mir), the CVM limit is ₽3000.
Saudi Arabia	300 SAR	For transactions over 300 SAR, PIN is required.
Serbia	4000 RSD	For transactions over 4000 RSD, PIN verification is required.
Singapore	S$200	Transaction limit for NETS contactless payments in Singapore was initially set at S$100, although some banks offer higher. For mobile contactless payments, there are no transaction limits. Most banks and payment processors set a S$200 limit.
Slovakia	€50 PIN	For transactions over €50 PIN is needed (limit raised from €20 in 2020). After reaching the cumulative limit of €150, PIN is required.
Slovenia	€25 PIN	For transactions over €25 PIN is needed.
South Africa	200/500 ZAR	Increased to R500 in May 2017 (except for ABSA Bank which remained at R200)
Spain	€50 PIN	For more than €50 PIN verification is mandatory except using mobile payments sometimes. It was increased from €20 to €50 to avoid contact because of the COVID-19 pandemic.
Sri Lanka	LKR 5000	For more than LKR 5000 PIN/signature verification is required
Sweden	200 SEK	For each transaction over 200 SEK a PIN is required.
Switzerland	80 CHF	For transactions over 80 CHF a PIN is required.
Taiwan	No limit	Signatures may be required for large purchases.
Thailand	฿1500	
Turkey	₺750	For transactions over ₺750 PIN is required.
Ukraine	₴1,500	For transactions over ₴1,500 a PIN is required
United Arab Emirates	Dh500	
United Kingdom	No limit	Although unlimited contactless payments were authorised from 19 March 2026, no bank has yet raised their limit from the previous maximum of £100. Previous limits: £10 (1 September 2007 – 28 February 2010); £15 (1 March 2010 – 31 May 2012); £20 (1 June 2012 – 31 August 2015); £30 (1 September 2015 – 31 March 2020); £45 (1 April 2020 – 14 October 2021); £100 (15 October 2021 – 18 March 2026); There is no transaction limit when using contactless with two-factor authentication (e.g. Apple Pay), although some merchants who have not updated their card terminals' software apply a £250 limit as if there was no authentication; this is gradually improving.
United States	No limit	A signature may be required for large purchases. Banks may set their own limits or require a PIN.

== See also ==
- Apple Pay
- BHIM
- Digital currency
- Contactless smart card
- Cashless society
- Dashtop mobile
- Google Pay
- Microsoft Pay
- Mobile payment
- Near field communication
- Proximity card
- Octopus card
- Opus card
- Oyster card
- Opal card
- Presto card
- Rav-Kav
- Ventra
- Samsung Pay
- Softcard (formerly Isis mobile wallet)
- Vicinity cards
