= Stanley Dashew =

Stanley A. Dashew
- Born: September 16, 1916; Harlem, New York
- Died: April 25, 2013 (aged 96); Los Angeles
- Other names: Stan Dashew
- Occupations: Entrepreneur, inventor, industrialist, photojournalist
- Known for: Inventor of the plastic credit card

Stanley Aaron Dashew (September 16, 1916 – April 25, 2013) was an American inventor who developed many devices in diverse industries, but remains best known as one of the founders of the plastic credit card industry during the 1950s. Working alongside Joseph P. Williams, then Vice President of Bank of America, Dashew introduced the Databosser, which embossed numbers read from an IBM punch card onto a credit card, originally aluminum alloy, then plastic.

Dashew has been issued fourteen U.S. patents directly, and more than fifty assigned to his many companies. He has created mechanical systems in the business data, banking, shipping, mining, transportation, marine recreation, water purification, and medical-health industries. These included the Databosser and Datawriter under Dashew Business Machines, the single point mooring buoy in Imodco (SBM Offshore), the Dashaveyor mining cars and people transport, a ship bow thruster under the Omnithruster Company, liquid aeration and oxygenation treatments through Omniphaser, wastewater purification system for Biomixer, Inc., and personal spinal decompression mobility devices under the title Dashaway on YouTube—the latter developed and marketed under his oversight, while in his nineties, from 2005 to 2010.

== Early life ==
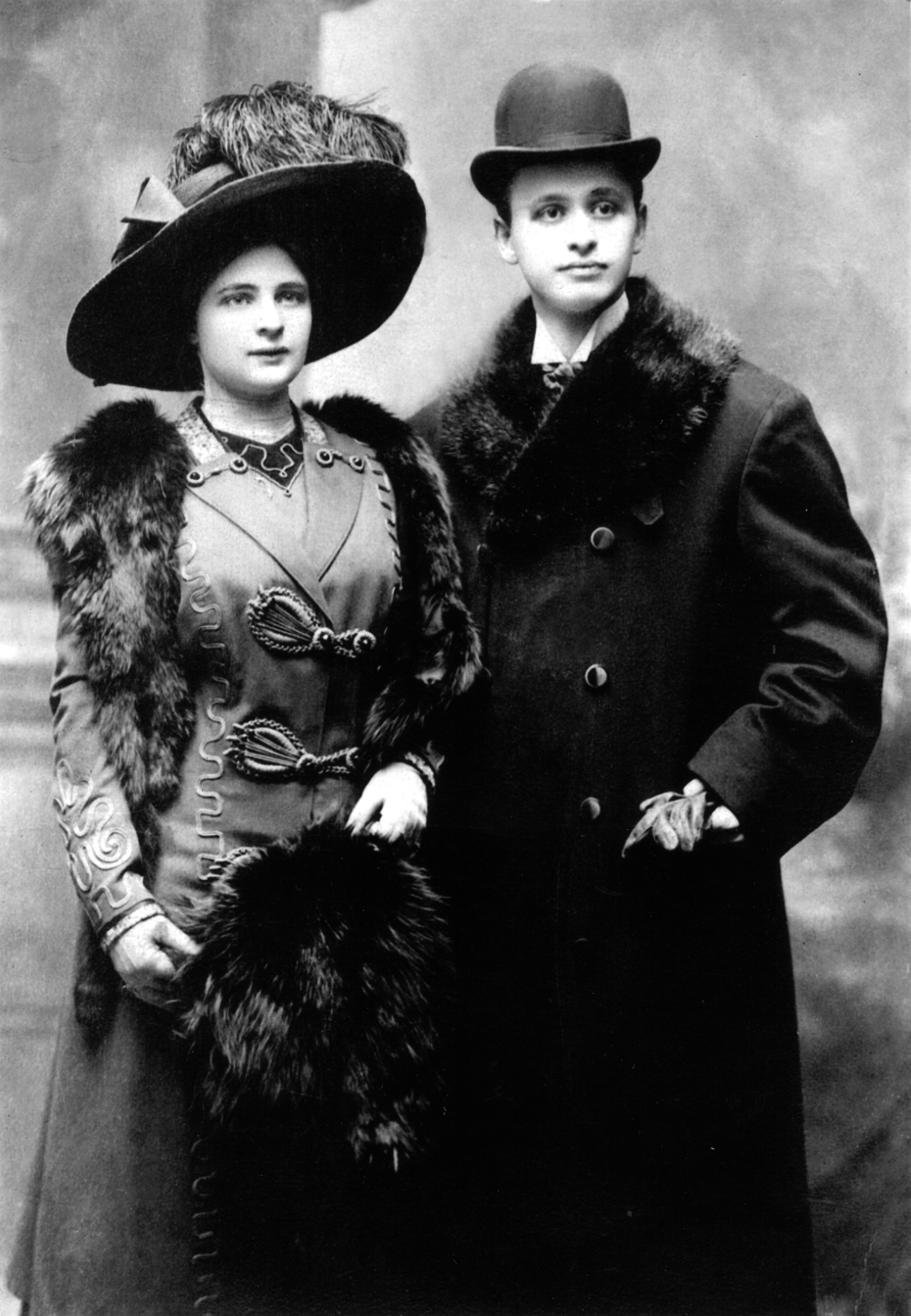
Parents Esther (Turits) and Leon Dashew, circa 1900 after emigration from Russia to America, at time of marriage.

Dashew's mother and father emigrated from Russia and Lithuania, respectively, during the pogroms and poverty caused by the Cossack uprising that eventually led to the Bolshevik or Red Revolution.

Dashew was the middle child of the family, born in the Harlem district in New York City. He spent most of his childhood on a sixty-five-acre agricultural property his parents owned in Pomona, New York, with his two sisters. The Dashew family ran their homestead as a summer resort—first for family and friends, and later year-round for vacationers and residents. Dashew's first foray into business at age eight was a soda pop bottle redemption service, and his first endeavor at direct customer sales came at age twelve (door-to-door bushels of peaches). By age fifteen, he had also become a Hires Root Beer reseller and sold at a roadway stand with the family's produce and fruit. During his teenage and high school years, at the height of The Great Depression, he also helped manage his family's properties; he secured the first business bank loan for the family enterprise, by himself.

== Early career ==
Dashew did not feel he had the mathematic and mechanical aptitude required for architecture or engineering. Instead, he steered himself toward law, by working part-time in his father's office. However, he eventually became disenchanted with the law and thrust himself into pursuit of a writing career by moving to New York City, where he lived for a short time with his grandmother and paternal aunts. He accepted a position as a sales representative after exaggerating his age on the job application. In his initial career position with Addressograph-Multigraph, makers of business addressing machinery, the first task Dashew set himself to was to change his business cards to read "Special Representative" because he disliked the reputation of "Sales". Although Dashew had a distaste for selling product, he excelled at designing systems that helped customers find solutions for their business challenges, which employed his company's products. Within two years, he had made it into the top sales bracket Hundred Club as a lifetime member—the only employee or agency manager, and youngest, to maintain the standing for ten consecutive years. He never had the opportunity to transfer to the Advertising Department. In 1942, he took a promotion from Addressograph-Multigraph to move to Grand Rapids, Michigan where he established a successful business machines sales agency.

Shortly after marrying Martha Grossman in March 1938, Dashew took an interest in sailboat ownership and cruising. At the same time, from the late 1940s to early 1950s, he started writing short magazine articles about the sailor's skills and travels, published in magazines such as Outdoor Life and Motor Boating & Sailing. In 1949, he and his wife, Martha, outfitted a 76-foot schooner, Constellation, and set sail with his young family. They sailed from the Great Lakes, up the St. Lawrence Seaway, down the East Coast, through the Caribbean and West Indies, though the Panama Canal, and up the Mexican Pacific to finally arrive and settle in Los Angeles, California. Their voyage was notable—making headlines across the Americas—because of its duration, the tall-ship's masts and sails, their visit to a Haitian voodoo ceremony, and the fact that crew included their seven-year-old son, Skip (Stephen), and their three-month-old baby daughter, Leslie.

== Return to business ==
Rather than return to his old company as a field agency head or central office manager when he returned from sailing, Dashew formed his own business machines company in Los Angeles, California. He started by importing calculators and moved into data automation, hoping to eventually to compete with his former employer. Dashew Business Machines produced a variety of machines that embossed identification tags for the military and other industrial uses, including imprinters, which, when combined with the unique embossing machines, formed the foundation for today's credit card industry. Hughes Dynamics, a subsidiary of Hughes Tool Company, bought a controlling interest in Dashew Business Machines in 1963. Dashew was looking to garner additional monies with which to expand his business, but the relationship with Hughes did not go well and Dashew Business Machines went into bankruptcy in 1965.

Dashew's work with Bank of America led to the creation of the BankAmericard, the first plastic bank credit card system. Diners Club and other bank and credit card programs quickly followed. His further work with Joe Williams, retired from Bank of America, led to the introduction of Uni-card (taken over from Chase Manhattan Bank), which was later renamed Visa. To pitch his company's unique position to American Express to emboss more variable data faster than his competitors, he printed the name of each board executive on each man's sample card, along with a date and the catchphrase he created, "Member Since…”

Dashew then took the helm of a fledgling Swedish enterprise and facilitated the worldwide introduction of single-point mooring systems for offshore oil production developed through the IMODCO Company. The Dashaveyor Company, a people-mover system builder, gained many worldwide patents under Dashew's direction, as did Omnithruster Company, maker of a bow-thruster system to help maneuver ships and military vessels. Other start-up companies followed, including most recently the Dashaway Company, a personal mobility and exercise device for elderly, spinal surgery, Parkinson's disease sufferers (like himself), and other patients.

== Personal life ==
Dashew's son, Steve, is a well-known naval architect and cruising yachtsman. Steve's daughter, Sarah, is a successful singer-songwriter.

== Philanthropy ==
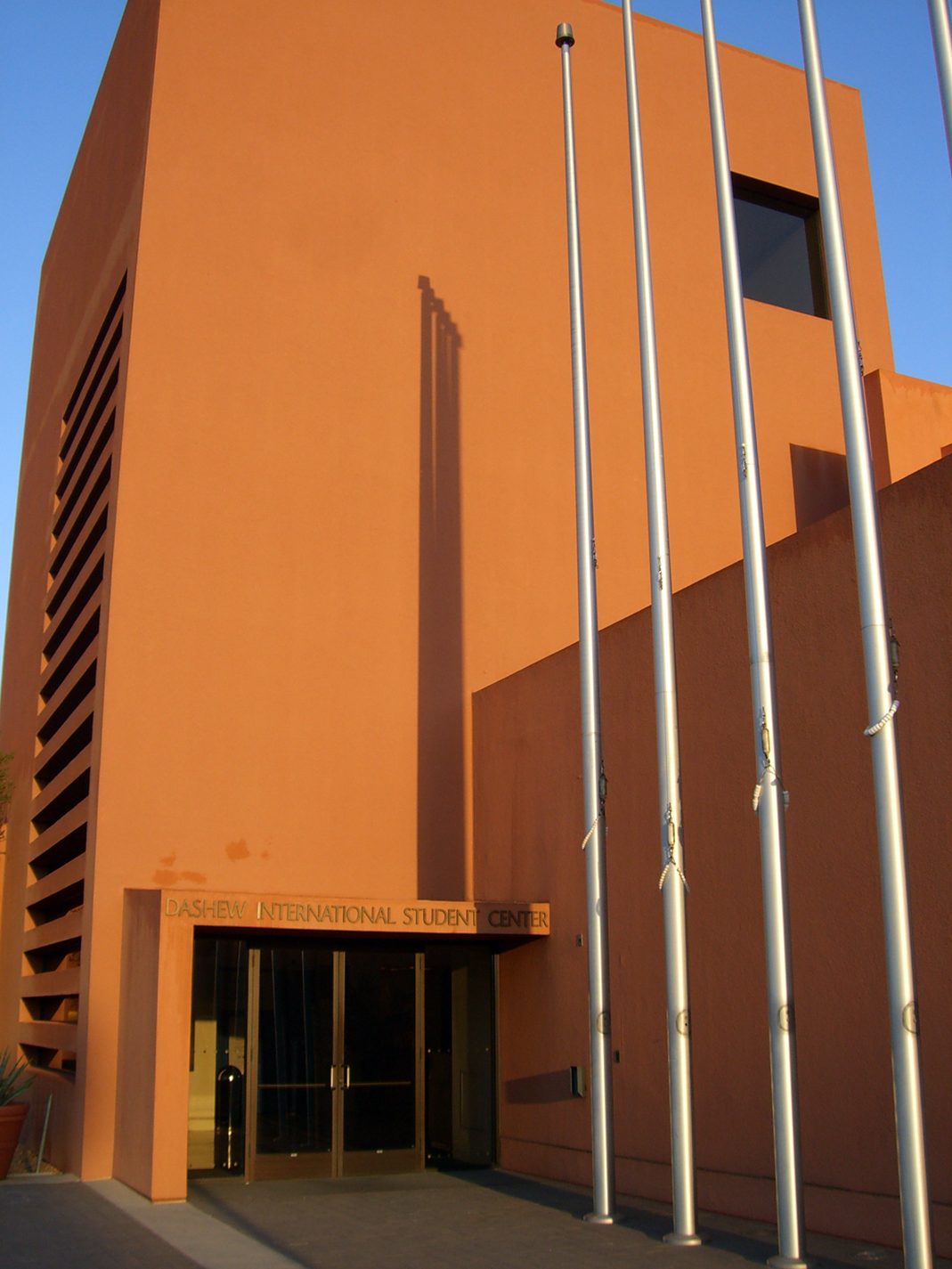
The Dashew Center for International Students and Scholars at UCLA.

During the 1970s, Dashew with the support of his second wife, Rita, initiated and conceived the plan to build the UCLA International Student Center that bears their name.

In 2000, Chancellor Albert Carnesale presented Dashew the UCLA Medal, the university's highest honor. Dashew dedicated the medal to the student volunteers, the community volunteers, and the board of directors at the center.

== Publications ==
In January 2011, at age 94, Dashew published his memoir, You Can Do It: Inspiration and Lessons from an Inventor, Entrepreneur, and Sailor (ISBN 978-0982927502). The book was written over a ten-year period with co-author Josef S. Klus.
