= Joseph P. Williams =

American banker

- Born: Joseph Patrick Williams; March 22, 1915; Newark, New Jersey, U.S.
- Died: November 9, 2003 (aged 88); Atlantis, Florida, U.S.
- Education: University of Pennsylvania
- Occupation: Banker
- Employer: Bank of America
- Known for: Father of the BankAmericard (now Visa)

Joseph P. Williams (February 2, 1915 – November 8, 2003) was the creator of the BankAmericard, the first nationwide bank credit card, which later evolved into the VISA brand.

== Early life ==
Williams was born in Newark, New Jersey. He attended the University of Pennsylvania and served as an infantry officer in the United States Army during World War II.

== Career ==
As an admirer of A.P. Giannini's aggressive banking approach at the Bank of America, he drove to San Francisco after completing his military service and approached Giannini for a job at the bank.

Diners Club, the first major travel and entertainment charge card, had been introduced in 1950, and American Express and Carte Blanche followed in 1958, but all of these offerings had to have bills repaid in 30 days and were accepted by a limited number of vendors. By the mid-1950s, Williams was the senior vice president in charge of a group that had the unofficial task of creating the nation's first all-purpose credit card. Studying previous failures and analyzing the successes by Sears, Roebuck and Company and Mobil in offering credit to their customers, the team led by Williams conceived of a set of features — an 18% interest rate applied after a 25-day grace period, credit limits and floor limits — that became the standards for the credit card industry since.

In 1958 the bank sent 60,000 BankAmericard offers to residents of Fresno, California, followed by Bakersfield, California with two million more offers sent statewide in the subsequent 15 months, marking what was called by The New York Times as "the official dawn of the bank credit card". The cards had preapproved credit lines ranging from US$300 to US$500 and floor limits of US$25 to US$100.

Resentment from merchants and customer delinquencies started almost immediately, and Williams left Bank of America two months before the bank's statewide rollout was complete. The bank lost almost US$9 million in just over a year after the cards were introduced. More than 20% defaulted on payment ... a blip (in total revenue).

During the 1962 New York City newspaper strike, Williams published The New York Standard, one of several alternative newspapers that were published during the 114-day strike that hit the city's major newspapers.

He formed the Uni-Serve Corporation in 1962 and bought the credit card operations from Chase Manhattan Bank for US$9 million, the value of the unit's unpaid billings. Uni-Serve was sold to American Express in 1965, with Williams remaining as president of the unit until 1966 and as the unit's chairman until 1968.

== Death ==
Williams died at age 88 on November 8, 2003 at his home in Atlantis, Florida.

== See also ==
- Banking in the United States
- Credit
- MasterCard
