= Visa Buxx =

Line of prepaid cards offered by Visa

Visa Buxx is a prepaid card available in the United States and intended for use by teenagers.

== Overview ==
The program was Visa's first prepaid card product and was launched in 2000. Visa Buxx is not a credit card; instead, it debits a prepaid account, which enables parents to load the card's account online or over the phone and monitor spending, so parents can work with their teen to review their spending habits and avoid unexpected debt and interest charges. The face of a current Buxx card identifies it as a debit card.

A child must be at least 13 years old to obtain the card (and the account must be set up by an adult).

The current distributors of the Visa Buxx card offer the Visa Buxx card only to existing account holders.

== Current distributors ==
- Navy Federal Credit Union
- TD Bank

== History ==
Shortly after its 2000 launch, a number of banks and other financial institutions issued Visa Buxx cards, including Bank of America, Capital One, and US Bank. Although Visa's rules for issuing the Visa Buxx card require that all Visa Buxx cards meet certain program requirements, the issuers determine the fees for use of their Visa Buxx cards. The fees varied significantly among different issuers.

The most common fees for Visa Buxx cards were purchase or activation fees, monthly fees, and reload fees. Activation fees ranged from $4 - 12. Monthly fees ranged from $0 - $5. Reload fees--fees for transferring money to the Buxx card--ranged from $0 - 2.50. Other fees varied as well, but depending on the issuer, could include fees for ATM transactions, card replacement, or an account-closing refund.

Of the more than 12 banks, credit unions, and other financial institutions that have issued the Visa Buxx card, only two remain. US Bank, the first Visa Buxx issuer, discontinued its Visa Buxx card in 2015.

== Fees ==
Fees charged by the remaining two issuers include a purchase or activation fee of $0 - $4.95. Neither charge monthly fees. Both charge some other fees (e.g., for paper statement delivery, ATM cash withdrawals and balance inquiries, foreign-currency transactions, card replacement, or an account-closing refund).
