= Dee Hock =

Founder and former CEO of Visa Inc.

- Dee Hock in 2018
- Born: Dee Ward Hock; March 21, 1929; North Ogden, Utah, U.S.
- Died: July 16, 2022 (aged 93); Olympia, Washington, U.S.
- Education: Weber College
- Occupations: Entrepreneur, founder & CEO of the Visa credit card association (1970s–1984)
- Spouse: Ferol Cragun (died 2018)
- Children: 3

Dee Ward Hock (March 21, 1929 – July 16, 2022) was an American entrepreneur who was the founder and CEO of the Visa credit card association.

== Early life and education ==
Hock was born in North Ogden, Utah, in 1929. His father, Alma, was a utility lineworker, and his mother, Cecil, was a homemaker. He participated in high school debate and received a scholarship to Weber College where he graduated with a two-year degree in 1949.

== Career ==
After graduation, Hock began working various jobs in the financial services industry. He served as the manager of two Pacific Finance branches, an assistant manager of public relations and advertising for Pacific Finance, a general manager of Columbia Investment Company, and then as a supervisor at CIT Financial. In 1966, he was hired by National Bank of Commerce, a local bank in Seattle, Washington. In 1967, he began managing the bank's credit card brand, BankAmericard, which was being licensed from Bank of America. Through a series of unlikely accidents, Hock helped invent and became chief executive of the credit system that became Visa Inc. Early on, he convinced Bank of America to give up ownership and control of its BankAmericard credit card licensing program, forming a new company, National BankAmerica, which was owned by its member banks. The name was changed to Visa in 1976.

In May 1984, Hock resigned his management role with Visa, retiring to spend almost ten years in relative isolation working a 200-acre (0.81 km^{2}) ranch on the Pacific coast to the west of Silicon Valley in Pescadero, California. He was inducted into Junior Achievement's U.S. Business Hall of Fame in 1991, and the Money magazine hall of fame in 1992.

In his 1991 Business Hall of Fame acceptance speech, Hock explained:

Through the years, I have greatly feared and sought to keep at bay the four beasts that inevitably devour their keeper – Ego, Envy, Avarice, and Ambition. In 1984, I severed all connections with business for a life of isolation and anonymity, convinced I was making a great bargain by trading money for time, position for liberty, and ego for contentment – that the beasts were securely caged.

Hock had built Visa as a deliberately decentralized organization. In March 1993, Hock gave a dinner speech at the Santa Fe Institute where, based on his experiences founding and operating Visa International, he described systems that are both chaotic and ordered, using the term "chaordic" from the words "chaos" and "order".

In February 1994, Hock accepted a grant from the Joyce Foundation for his travel expenses to study the possibilities of implementing chaordic organizations. The non-profit Alliance for Community Liberty was formed in 1994 by Hock to develop, disseminate and implement these new concepts of organization, and was renamed The Chaordic Alliance in 1996. In spring 2001, The Chaordic Commons, a 501(c)3 nonprofit organization, was formed to supersede the Chaordic Alliance.

== Impact on organization development ==
In addition to his career in the financial industry, Hock has been active in developing new models of social and business organization. He has been particularly interested in forms of organization that are neither rigidly controlled nor anarchic, a hybrid form he terms chaordic.

Hock has authored a book on the subject, Birth of the Chaordic Age (1999) with an edition named One from Many: VISA and the Rise of Chaordic Organization (2005) which includes two new chapters.

== Personal life ==
Hock married his high school girlfriend, Ferol Delors Cragun, when he was 20. She died in 2018. Hock died on July 16, 2022, at the age of 93. He was survived by two children, seven grandchildren, and seven great grandchildren.
