= Sarah Dashew =

American singer-songwriter

Sarah Dashew is an American singer-songwriter, known for her background of sailing around the world and her work with producer Chuck Plotkin.

== Early life ==
She was born Sarah Jo Dashew on October 24, 1972, in Los Angeles, California. Her parents are Stephen and Linda Dashew, and her sister is Elyse Dashew. Her grandfather was Stanley Dashew, well known for creating the plastic credit card industry in the 1950s. When Dashew was four years old, her family left California and spent seven years sailing around the world. Music was almost always playing on the boat, either on the stereo or with locals piled on board playing instruments and singing. Her parents are well known boat designers and authors. When Dashew was 11, the family moved to Ojai, California where she attended public schools and graduated valedictorian from her high school. She graduated from Wesleyan University, where she formed her first band and sang in a gospel choir.

After five years of living in Austin, Texas, playing locally and touring in Europe, she moved back to Los Angeles where she met and began to work with Chuck Plotkin.

== Career ==
In 2006, Dashew released her debut album produced by Chuck Plotkin, Jealous Girl. The songs "Jealous Girl" and "Hash it Out" were featured on the NBC show My Name is Earl. Of working on her songs with Plotkin, Dashew said “We would sit on the floor of his boat, slapping our knees and figuring out how to tap into the universe’s navel." The album received critical accolades from Sing Out! and the Austin Chronicle, among others.

In 2008, Dashew wrote two songs for the independent film "Blues" starring Ari Graynor, which became the starting point for her next album.

In 2010 Dashew released the album Where I Belong. America Ferrera chose two songs, "Take Me In" and "Morningtime" to be on her celebrity iTunes playlist. During an interview with the Huffington Post about the album and describing her music, Dashew noted "I would describe my music as lyrically driven: I'm a lover of words. But not too many words. The music is earthy, a little raw. My voice is not classically trained--there's smoke in there (though I'm not a smoker) and some ache, hopefully some soul. I started out singing in a gospel choir, which explains my love of harmony. I like major keys and I like resolution, so the melodies are usually light. I've been compared to Janis Joplin and Sheryl Crow and Carole King, all of which I take as compliments."

In 2013, Dashew released a self-titled album on which she played every instrument, including piano, percussion, accordion, harmonica, bass, acoustic and electric guitars.

On March 25, 2014, she released an EP titled Something in the Weather, recorded in her old hometown of Ojai, CA, featuring high school friend and well known drummer Mario Calire. In 2016, Dashew released Roll Like A Wheel, a full-length album recorded at the historic London Bridge Studio in Seattle, WA. Singles followed in 2017, 2019, and 2020.

In December 2019, Dashew self-published a picture book featuring the lyrics to her song "Do You Hear the Call".

In February, 2020, Sarah Dashew was invited to speak at Wake Forest University's TedX Conference, where she gave a 19-minute speech on re-defining success as a creative, childhood, freedom and more.

In January 2022, Sarah Dashew released her first full-length album in six years, titled The Snowmass Sessions, recorded at the legendary Mad Dog Ranch + Studios in Snowmass, Colorado.

Dashew is also known for physically, emotionally intense live performances, with storytelling woven throughout. She traditionally ends every show with ad-libbing and free-styling over a song, culminating in a call for love.

Dashew is also known for physically, emotionally intense live performances. She ends every show with adlibbing and free-styling over a song, culminating in a call for love.

== Personal life ==
Dashew currently lives in Phoenix, Arizona. She is married to interior designer Denise LaVey and has two dogs. She is an avid reader, citing Hemingway as a favorite writer. She is fond of yoga, and is still very involved with boating.
