= Visa Inc. =

American payment card services corporation

- Logo used since 2021 (Note: Current "Visa" wordmark used since 2014.)

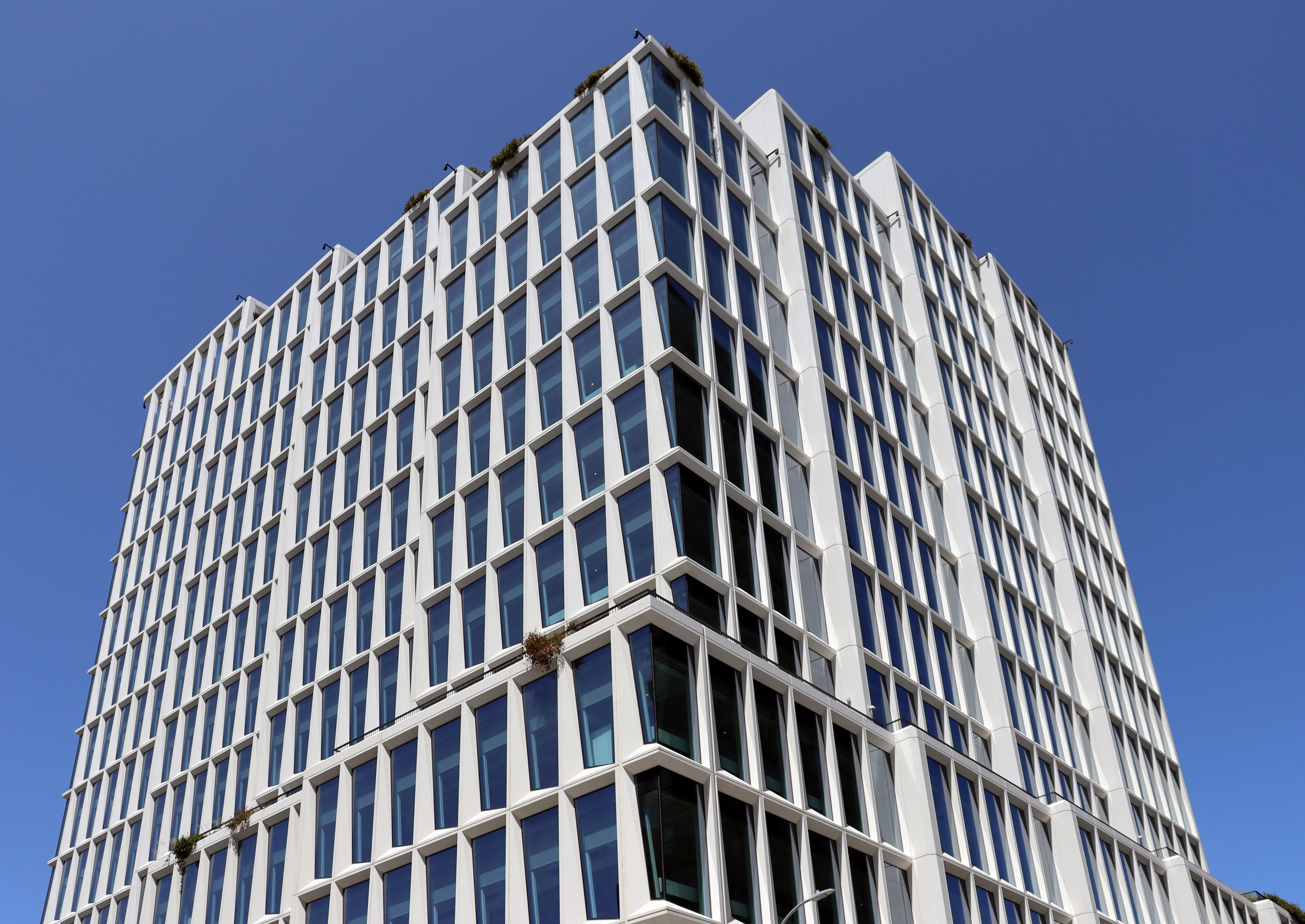
- Market Support Center (de facto headquarters) in San Francisco
- Formerly: BankAmericard (1958–1976)
- Type: Public
- Traded as: NYSE: V (Class A); DJIA component; S&P 100 component; S&P 500 component
- Industry: Payment cards services
- Founded: September 18, 1958; 68 years ago (as BankAmericard in Fresno, California, U.S.)
- Founder: Bank of America (as BankAmericard); Dee Hock (as Visa)
- Headquarters: San Francisco, California, U.S.
- Area served: Worldwide
- Key people: Ryan McInerney (CEO); John F. Lundgren (chairman); Oliver Jenkyn (group president & Global Markets); Kelly Mahon Tullier (vice chair & CPO)
- Products: Credit cards; Debit cards; Payment systems
- Revenue: ▲US$40.00 billion (2025)
- Operating income: ▲US$23.99 billion (2025)
- Net income: ▲US$20.06 billion (2025)
- Total assets: ▲US$99.63 billion (2025)
- Total equity: ▼US$37.91 billion (2025)
- Number of employees: 34,100 (2025)
- Website: visa.com
- Footnotes; Financials as of September 30, 2025.

Visa Inc. (/ˈviːzə, ˈviːsə/) is an American multinational payment card services corporation headquartered in San Francisco, California, United States. It facilitates electronic funds transfers worldwide, most commonly through Visa-branded credit cards, debit cards and prepaid cards.

Visa does not issue cards, extend credit, or set rates and fees for consumers; rather, Visa provides financial institutions with Visa-branded payment products that they then use to offer credit, debit, prepaid and cash access programs to their customers. In 2025, Visa's global network (known as VisaNet) processed 257.5 billion transactions worth US$14.2 trillion.

Visa was founded in 1958 by Bank of America (BofA) as the BankAmericard credit card program. In response to competitor Master Charge (now Mastercard), BofA began to license the BankAmericard program to other financial institutions in 1966. Growing friction over BofA's licensing of the program outside its own network led Dee Hock, who had joined to manage the card's Pacific Northwest rollout in 1968, to persuade the bank that BankAmericard could succeed as an independent operation. By 1970, BofA had placed control of the program with card issuer banks, who established National BankAmericard with Hock as president and CEO. National BankAmericard was then renamed Visa in 1976.

Nearly all Visa transactions worldwide are processed through the company's directly operated VisaNet at one of four secure data centers, located in Ashburn, Virginia, and Highlands Ranch, Colorado, in the United States; London, England; and in Singapore. These facilities are heavily secured against natural disasters, crime, and terrorism; can operate independently of each other and from external utilities if necessary; and can handle up to 30,000 simultaneous transactions and up to 100 billion computations every second.

Visa is the world's second-largest card payment organization (debit and credit cards combined), after being surpassed by China UnionPay in 2015, based on annual value of card payments transacted and number of issued cards. However, because UnionPay's size is based primarily on the size of its domestic market in China, Visa is still considered the dominant bankcard company in the rest of the world, where it commands a 50% market share of total card payments.

== History ==
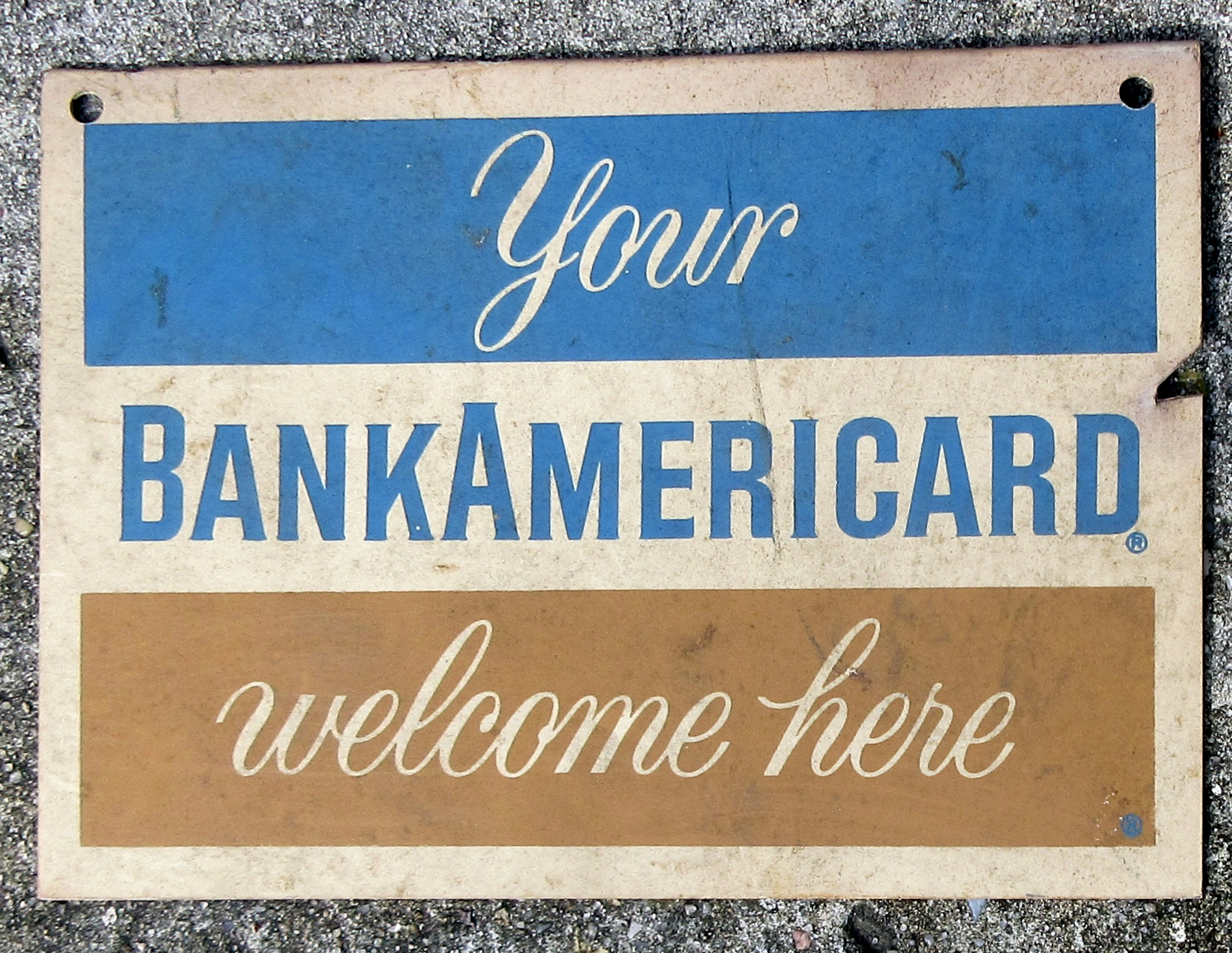
Old "Your BankAmericard Welcome Here" sign

A 1976 ad promoting the change of name to "Visa". An early Visa card is shown in the ad, as well as the BankAmericard that it replaced.

On September 18, 1958, Bank of America (BofA) officially launched its BankAmericard credit card program in Fresno, California. In the weeks leading up to the launch of BankAmericard, BofA had saturated Fresno mailboxes with an initial mass mailing (or "drop", as they came to be called) of 65,000 unsolicited credit cards. BankAmericard was the brainchild of BofA's in-house product development think tank, the Customer Services Research Group, and its leader, Joseph P. Williams. Williams convinced senior BofA executives in 1956 to let him pursue what became the world's first successful mass mailing of unsolicited credit cards (actual working cards, not mere applications) to a large population.

Williams' pioneering accomplishment was that he brought about the successful implementation of the all-purpose credit card (in the sense that his project was not canceled outright), not in coming up with the idea. By the mid-1950s, the typical middle-class American already maintained revolving credit accounts with several different merchants, which was clearly inconvenient and inefficient due to the need to carry so many cards and pay so many separate bills each month. The need for a unified financial instrument was already evident to the American financial services industry, but no one could figure out how to do it. There were already charge cards like Diners Club (which had to be paid in full at the end of each billing cycle), and "by the mid-1950s, there had been at least a dozen attempts to create an all-purpose credit card." However, these prior attempts had been carried out by small banks which lacked the resources to make them work. Williams and his team studied these failures carefully and believed they could avoid replicating those banks' mistakes; they also studied existing revolving credit operations at Sears and Mobil Oil to learn why they were successful. Fresno was selected for its population of 250,000 (big enough to make a credit card work, small enough to control initial startup cost), BofA's market share of that population (45%), and relative isolation, to control public relations damage in case the project failed. According to Williams, Florsheim Shoes was the first major retail chain which agreed to accept BankAmericard at its stores.

Visa logo used from July 1, 1992 to 2000

Visa logo used from August 1998 to 2005

Visa logo used from late 2005 to January 2014

Visa logo used from January 2014 to July 2021

Visa logo used since July 2021

Visa acceptance logo from early 2015 (used only in certain Asian, American and European markets)

The 1958 test at first went smoothly, but then BofA panicked when it confirmed rumors that another bank was about to initiate its own drop in San Francisco, BofA's home market. By March 1959, drops began in San Francisco and Sacramento; by June, BofA was dropping cards in Los Angeles; by October, the entire state of California had been saturated with over 2 million credit cards and BankAmericard was being accepted by 20,000 merchants. However, the program was riddled with problems, as Williams (who had never worked in a bank's loan department) had been too earnest and trusting in his belief in the basic goodness of the bank's customers, and he resigned in December 1959. Twenty-two percent of accounts were delinquent, not the 4% expected, and police departments around the state were confronted by numerous incidents of the brand new crime of credit card fraud. Both politicians and journalists joined the general uproar against Bank of America and its newfangled credit card, especially when it was pointed out that the cardholder agreement held customers liable for all charges, even those resulting from fraud. BofA officially lost over $8.8 million on the launch of BankAmericard, but when the full cost of advertising and overhead was included, the bank's actual loss was probably around $20 million.

However, after Williams and some of his closest associates left, BofA management realized that BankAmericard was salvageable. They conducted a "massive effort" to clean up after Williams, imposed proper financial controls, published an open letter to 3 million households across the state apologizing for the credit card fraud and other issues its card raised and eventually were able to make the new financial instrument work. By May 1961, the BankAmericard program became profitable for the first time. At the time, BofA deliberately kept this information secret and allowed then-widespread negative impressions to linger in order to ward off competition. This strategy worked until 1966, when BankAmericard's profitability had become far too big to hide.

The original goal of BofA was to offer the BankAmericard product across California, but in 1966, BofA began to sign licensing agreements with a group of banks outside of California, in response to a new competitor, Master Charge (now Mastercard), which had been created by an alliance of several regional bankcard associations to compete against BankAmericard. BofA itself (like all other U.S. banks at the time) could not expand directly into other states due to federal restrictions not repealed until 1994. Over the following 11 years, various banks licensed the card system from Bank of America, thus forming a network of banks backing the BankAmericard system across the United States. The "drops" of unsolicited credit cards continued unabated, thanks to BofA and its licensees and competitors until they were outlawed in 1970, but not before over 100 million credit cards had been distributed into the American population.

During the late 1960s, BofA also licensed the BankAmericard program to banks in several other countries, which began issuing cards with localized brand names. For example:

- In Canada, an alliance of banks (including Toronto-Dominion Bank, Canadian Imperial Bank of Commerce, Royal Bank of Canada, Banque Canadienne Nationale and Bank of Nova Scotia) issued credit cards under the Chargex name from 1968 to 1977.
- In France, it was known as Carte Bleue (Blue Card). The logo still appears on many French-issued Visa cards today.
- In Japan, The Sumitomo Bank issued BankAmericards through the Sumitomo Credit Service.
- In the UK, the only BankAmericard issuer for some years was Barclaycard. The branding still exists today, but is used not only on Visa cards issued by Barclays, but on its MasterCard and American Express cards as well.
- In Spain until 1979 the only issuer was Banco de Bilbao.

In 1968, a manager at the National Bank of Commerce (later Rainier Bancorp), Dee Hock, was asked to supervise that bank's launch of its own licensed version of BankAmericard in the Pacific Northwest market. Although Bank of America had cultivated the public image that BankAmericard's troubled startup issues were now safely in the past, Hock realized that the BankAmericard licensee program itself was in terrible disarray because it had developed and grown very rapidly in an ad hoc fashion. For example, "interchange" transaction issues between banks were becoming a very serious problem, which had not been seen before when Bank of America was the sole issuer of BankAmericards. Hock suggested to other licensees that they form a committee to investigate and analyze the various problems with the licensee program; they promptly made him the chair of that committee.

After lengthy negotiations, the committee led by Hock was able to persuade Bank of America that a bright future lay ahead for BankAmericard — outside Bank of America. In June 1970, Bank of America gave up control of the BankAmericard program. The various BankAmericard issuer banks took control of the program, creating National BankAmericard Inc. (NBI), an independent Delaware corporation which would be in charge of managing, promoting and developing the BankAmericard system within the United States. In other words, BankAmericard was transformed from a franchising system into a jointly controlled consortium or alliance, like its competitor Master Charge. Hock became NBI's first president and CEO.

However, Bank of America retained the right to directly license BankAmericard to banks outside the United States and continued to issue and support such licenses. By 1972, licenses had been granted in 15 countries. The international licensees soon encountered a variety of problems with their licensing programs, and they hired Hock as a consultant to help them restructure their relationship with BofA as he had done for the domestic licensees. As a result, in 1974, the International Bankcard Company (IBANCO), a multinational member corporation, was founded in order to manage the international BankAmericard program.

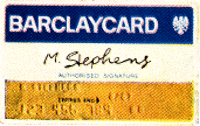
Sample Barclaycard (left), as issued in the UK in the 1960s/70s. Co-branded cards were also issued by affiliates, such as The Co-operative Bank and Yorkshire Bank. The Chargex logo (right) used in Canada.

In 1976, the directors of IBANCO determined that bringing the various international networks together into a single network with a single name internationally would be in the best interests of the corporation; however, in many countries, there was still great reluctance to issue a card associated with Bank of America, even though the association was entirely nominal in nature. For this reason, in 1976, BankAmericard, Barclaycard, Carte Bleue, Chargex, Sumitomo Card, and all other licensees united under the new name, "Visa", which retained the distinctive blue, white and gold flag. NBI became Visa USA and IBANCO became Visa International.

The term Visa was conceived by the company's founder, Dee Hock. He believed that the word was instantly recognizable in many languages in many countries and that it also denoted universal acceptance.

The announcement of the transition came on December 16, 1976, with VISA cards to replace expiring BankAmericard cards starting on March 1, 1977 (initially with both the BankAmericard name and the VISA name on the same card), and the various Bank of America issued cards worldwide being phased out by the end of October 1979.

In October 2007, Bank of America announced it was resurrecting the BankAmericard brand name as the "BankAmericard Rewards Visa".

In March 2022, following the Russian invasion of Ukraine, Visa announced that it would suspend all business operations in Russia.

=== Corporate structure ===
Prior to October 3, 2007, Visa comprised four non-stock, separately incorporated companies that employed 6,000 people worldwide: the worldwide parent entity Visa International Service Association (Visa), Visa USA Inc., Visa Canada Association, and Visa Europe Ltd. The latter three separately incorporated regions had the status of group members of Visa International Service Association.

The unincorporated regions Visa Latin America (LAC), Visa Asia Pacific and Visa Central and Eastern Europe, Middle East and Africa (CEMEA) were divisions within Visa.

=== Billing and finance charge methods ===
Initially, signed copies of sales drafts were included in each customer's monthly billing statement for verification purposes—an industry practice known as "country club billing". By the late 1970s, however, billing statements no longer contained these enclosures, but rather a summary statement showing posting date, purchase date, reference number, merchant name, and the dollar amount of each purchase. At the same time, many issuers, particularly Bank of America, were in the process of changing their methods of finance charge calculation. Initially, a "previous balance" method was used—calculation of finance charge on the unpaid balance shown on the prior month's statement. Later, it was decided to use "average daily balance" which resulted in increased revenue for the issuers by calculating the number of days each purchase was included on the prior month's statement. Several years later, "new average daily balance"—in which transactions from previous and current billing cycles were used in the calculation—was introduced. By the early 1980s, many issuers introduced the concept of the annual fee as yet another revenue enhancer.

=== IPO and restructuring ===
On October 11, 2006, Visa announced that some of its businesses would be merged and become a publicly traded company, Visa Inc. Under the IPO restructuring, Visa Canada, Visa International, and Visa USA were merged into the new public company. Visa's Western Europe operation became a separate company, owned by its member banks who will also have a minority stake in Visa Inc. In total, more than 35 investment banks participated in the deal in several capacities, most notably as underwriters.

On October 3, 2007, Visa completed its corporate restructuring with the formation of Visa Inc. The new company was the first step towards Visa's IPO. The second step came on November 9, 2007, when the new Visa Inc. submitted its $10 billion IPO filing with the U.S. Securities and Exchange Commission (SEC). On February 25, 2008, Visa announced it would go ahead with an IPO of half its shares. The IPO took place on March 18, 2008. Visa sold 406 million shares at US$44 per share ($2 above the high end of the expected $37–42 pricing range), raising US$17.9 billion in what was then the largest initial public offering in U.S. history. On March 20, 2008, the IPO underwriters (including JP Morgan, Goldman Sachs & Co., Bank of America Securities LLC, Citi, HSBC, Merrill Lynch & Co., UBS Investment Bank and Wachovia Securities) exercised their overallotment option, purchasing an additional 40.6 million shares, bringing Visa's total IPO share count to 446.6 million, and bringing the total proceeds to US$19.1 billion. Visa now trades under the ticker symbol "V" on the New York Stock Exchange.

=== Visa Europe ===
Visa Europe Ltd. was a membership association and cooperative of over 3,700 European banks and other payment service providers that operated Visa branded products and services within Europe. Visa Europe was a company entirely separate from Visa Inc. having gained independence of Visa International Service Association in October 2007 when Visa Inc. became a publicly traded company on the New York Stock Exchange. Visa Inc. announced the plan to acquire Visa Europe on November 2, 2015, creating a single global company. On April 21, 2016, the agreement was amended in response to the feedback of European Commission. The acquisition of Visa Europe was completed on June 21, 2016.

=== Failed acquisition of Plaid ===
On January 13, 2020, Plaid announced that it had signed a definitive agreement to be acquired by Visa for $5.3 billion. The deal was double the company's most recent Series C round valuation of $2.65 billion, and was expected to close in the next 3–6 months, subject to regulatory review and closing conditions. According to the deal, Visa would pay $4.9 billion in cash and approximately $400 million of retention equity and deferred equity, according to a presentation deck prepared by Visa.

On November 5, 2020, the United States Department of Justice filed a lawsuit seeking to block the acquisition, arguing that Visa is a monopolist trying to eliminate a competitive threat by purchasing Plaid. Visa said it disagreed with the lawsuit and "intends to defend the transaction vigorously." On January 12, 2021, Visa and Plaid announced they had abandoned the deal.

=== Digital currencies ===
On February 3, 2021, Visa announced a partnership with First Boulevard, a neobank promoting cryptocurrency, which has been touted as a means of building generational wealth for Black Americans. The partnership would allow their users to buy, sell, hold, and trade digital assets through Anchorage Digital.

On March 29, 2021, Visa announced the acceptance of stablecoin USDC to settle transactions on its network.

In September 2026, Visa announced plans to provide companies lending to stablecoin-linked card issuers with additional settlement data, allowing lenders to assess the financial performance of digital-asset-focused fintech companies and card issuers. The initiative uses on-chain lending infrastructure and smart contracts to facilitate access to financing.

=== Visa Foundation ===
Registered in the United States as a 501(c)(3) entity, the Visa Foundation was created with the mission of supporting inclusive economies. In particular, economies in which individuals, businesses and communities can thrive with the support of grants and investments. Supporting resiliency, as well as the growth, of micro and small businesses that benefit women is a priority of the Visa Foundation. Furthermore, the Foundation prioritizes providing support to the community from a broad standpoint, as well as responding to disasters during crisis.

=== Other initiatives ===
In December 2020, Visa Announced the launch of a new accelerator program across Asia Pacific to further develop the region's financial technology ecosystem. The accelerator program aims to find and partner with startup companies providing financial and payments technologies that could potentially leverage on Visa's network of bank and merchant partners in the region.

In August 2026, Visa agreed to acquire Israeli fraud-prevention company BioCatch for $2.4 billion in cash. BioCatch develops behavioral biometric technology used by financial institutions to detect fraud, account takeovers, scams and other financial crimes. The acquisition is expected to close by the end of Visa's fiscal second quarter of 2027, subject to regulatory approval.

== Finance ==
Sales by region (2023)
Region	Sales in billion $	share
United States	14.1	43.3%
International	18.5	56.7%

For the fiscal year 2025, Visa reported net income of US$20.1 billion and net revenue of US$40 billion, an increase of 11% in revenue from the previous fiscal year. As of 2022, the company ranked 147th on the Fortune 500 list of the largest United States corporations by revenue. Visa's shares traded at over $143 per share, and its market capitalization was valued at over US$280.2 billion in September 2018.

Year	Revenue in million US$	Net income in million US$	Employees
2005	2,665	360	
2006	2,948	455	
2007	3,590	−1,076	5,479
2008	6,263	804	5,765
2009	6,911	2,353	5,700
2010	8,065	2,966	6,800
2011	9,188	3,650	7,500
2012	10,421	2,144	8,500
2013	11,778	4,980	9,600
2014	12,702	5,438	9,500
2015	13,880	6,328	11,300
2016	15,082	5,991	11,300
2017	18,358	6,699	12,400
2018	20,609	10,301	15,000
2019	22,977	12,080	19,500
2020	21,846	10,866	20,500
2021	24,105	12,311	21,500
2022	29,310	14,957	26,500
2023	32,653	17,273	28,800
2024	35,926	19,743	31,600

== Criticism and controversy ==
=== WikiLeaks ===
Visa Europe began suspending payments to WikiLeaks on December 7, 2010. The company said it was awaiting an investigation into 'the nature of its business and whether it contravenes Visa operating rules' – though it did not go into details. In return DataCell, the IT company that enables WikiLeaks to accept credit and debit card donations, announced that it would take legal action against Visa Europe. On December 8, the group Anonymous performed a DDoS attack on visa.com, bringing the site down. Although the Norway-based financial services company Teller AS, which Visa ordered to look into WikiLeaks and its fundraising body, the Sunshine Press, found no proof of any wrongdoing, Salon reported in January 2011 that Visa Europe "would continue blocking donations to the secret-spilling site until it completes its own investigation".

In March 2012, Navi Pillay, the United Nations High Commissioner for Human Rights, stated that Visa may be "violating WikiLeaks' right to freedom of expression" by withdrawing their services. In July 2012, the Reykjavík District Court in Iceland decided that Valitor (the Icelandic partner of Visa and MasterCard) was violating the law when it prevented donations to the site by credit card. It was ruled that the donations be allowed to return to the site within 14 days or they would be fined in the amount of US$6,000 per day.

=== Litigation and regulatory actions ===
==== United States ====
===== Antitrust lawsuit by ATM operators =====
In 2011, MasterCard and Visa were sued in a class action by ATM operators claiming the credit card networks' rules effectively fix ATM access fees. The suit claimed that this is a restraint on trade in violation of US federal law. The lawsuit was filed by the National ATM Council and independent operators of automated teller machines. More specifically, it is alleged that MasterCard's and Visa's network rules prohibit ATM operators from offering lower prices for transactions over PIN-debit networks that are not affiliated with Visa or MasterCard. The suit says that this price-fixing artificially raises the price that consumers pay using ATMs, limits the revenue that ATM-operators earn, and violates the Sherman Act's prohibition against unreasonable restraints of trade.

Johnathan Rubin, an attorney for the plaintiffs said, "Visa and MasterCard are the ringleaders, organizers, and enforcers of a conspiracy among U.S. banks to fix the price of ATM access fees in order to keep the competition at bay."

In 2017, a US district court denied the ATM operators' request to stop Visa from enforcing the ATM fees.

===== Debit card swipe fees =====
In 1996, a class of U.S. merchants, including Walmart, brought an antitrust lawsuit against Visa and MasterCard over their "Honor All Cards" policy, which forced merchants who accepted Visa and MasterCard branded credit cards to also accept their respective debit cards (such as the "Visa Check Card"). Over 4 million class members were represented by the plaintiffs. According to a website associated with the suit, Visa and MasterCard settled the plaintiffs' claims in 2003 for a total of $3.05 billion. Visa's share of this settlement is reported to have been the larger.

===== U.S. Justice Department actions =====
In 1998, the U.S. Department of Justice sued Visa over rules prohibiting its issuing banks from doing business with American Express and Discover. The Department of Justice won its case at trial in 2001 and the verdict was upheld on appeal. American Express and Discover filed suit as well.

In October 2010, Visa and MasterCard reached a settlement with the Department of Justice in another antitrust case. The companies agreed to allow merchants displaying their logos to decline certain types of cards (because interchange fees differ), or to offer consumers discounts for using cheaper cards.

===== Payment card interchange fee and merchant discount antitrust litigation =====
On November 27, 2012, a federal judge entered an order granting preliminary approval to a proposed settlement to a class-action lawsuit filed in 2005 by merchants and trade associations against Mastercard and Visa. The suit was filed due to alleged price-fixing practices employed by Mastercard and Visa. About one-quarter of the named class plaintiffs have decided to opt "out of the settlement". Opponents object to provisions that would bar future lawsuits and even prevent merchants from opting out of significant portions of the proposed settlement.

Plaintiffs allege that Visa and Mastercard fixed interchange fees, also known as swipe fees, that are charged to merchants for the privilege of accepting payment cards. In their complaint, the plaintiffs also alleged that the defendants unfairly interfere with merchants from encouraging customers to use less expensive forms of payment such as lower-cost cards, cash, and checks.

A settlement of US$6.24 billion was scheduled for the court to approve or deny, on November 7, 2019.

Separately, in October 2025, merchants agreed to a $231.7 million settlement beforea U.S. District Judge, as B & R Supermarket, Inc., et al v. Visa, Inc. et al, for costs imposed in frauds related to counterfeit, lost, or stolen cards, with Visa agreeing to pay $119.7 million of the total settlement.

===== Confrontation with Walmart over high fees =====
In June 2016, the Wall Street Journal reported that Walmart threatened to stop accepting Visa cards in Canada. Visa objected saying that consumers should not be dragged into a dispute between the companies. In January 2017, Walmart Canada and Visa reached a deal to allow the continued acceptance of Visa.

===== Dispute with Kroger over high credit card fees =====
In March 2019, U.S. retailer Kroger announced that its 250-strong Smith's chain would stop accepting Visa credit cards as of April 3, 2019, due to the cards' high swipe fees. Kroger's California-based Foods Co stores stopped accepting Visa cards in August 2018. Mike Schlotman, Kroger's executive vice president/chief financial officer, said Visa had been "misusing its position and charging retailers excessive fees for a long time." In response, Visa issued a statement saying it was "unfair and disappointing that Kroger is putting shoppers in the middle of a business dispute." As of October 31, 2019, Kroger has settled its dispute with Visa and is now accepting the payment method.

===== 2020 Antitrust lawsuit challenging acquisition of Plaid =====
In January 2020 Visa announced it would acquire Plaid for $5.3 billion. In November 2020, the United States Department of Justice (DOJ) sued to block Visa's acquisition of fintech startup Plaid, claiming that the merger would violate antitrust laws. The DOJ argues that the merger would eliminate Plaid's potential ability to compete in the online debit market, thereby creating a monopoly for Visa. Visa CEO at the time Alfred Kelly described the acquisition bid as an "insurance policy" to neutralize a "threat to our important US debit business." In January 2021, Visa along with Plaid both mutually agreed to abandon its proposed acquisition.

===== 2021 Antitrust investigation over debit card practices =====
In March 2021, the United States Justice Department announced its investigation with Visa to discover if the company is engaging in anticompetitive practices in the debit card market. The main question at hand is whether or not Visa is limiting merchants' ability to route debit card transactions over card networks that are often less expensive, focusing more so on online debit card transactions. The probe highlights the role of network fees, which are invisible to consumers and place pressure on merchants, who mitigate the fees by raising prices of goods for customers. The probe was confirmed through a regulatory filing on March 19, 2021, stating it will be cooperating with the Justice Department. Visa's shares fell more than 6% following the announcement. On September 24, 2024, the Justice Department sued Visa, alleging that Visa used illegal tactics to maintain a monopoly in debit-card payments.

==== Outside of the United States ====
===== Anti-competitive conduct in Australia =====
In 2015, the Australian Federal Court ordered Visa to pay a pecuniary penalty of $20 million (including legal fees) for engaging in anti-competitive conduct against dynamic currency conversion operators, in proceedings brought by the Australian Competition and Consumer Commission.

===== Antitrust issues in Europe =====
In 2002, the European Commission exempted Visa's multilateral interchange fees from Article 81 of the EC Treaty that prohibits anti-competitive arrangements. However, this exemption expired on December 31, 2007. In the United Kingdom, Mastercard has reduced its interchange fees while it is under investigation by the Office of Fair Trading.

In January 2007, the European Commission issued the results of a two-year inquiry into the retail banking sector. The report focuses on payment cards and interchange fees. Upon publishing the report, Commissioner Neelie Kroes said the "present level of interchange fees in many of the schemes we have examined does not seem justified." The report called for further study of the issue.

On March 26, 2008, the European Commission opened an investigation into Visa's multilateral interchange fees for cross-border transactions within the EEA as well as into the "Honor All Cards" rule (under which merchants are required to accept all valid Visa-branded cards).

The antitrust authorities of EU member states (other than the United Kingdom) also investigated Mastercard's and Visa's interchange fees. For example, on January 4, 2007, the Polish Office of Competition and Consumer Protection fined twenty banks a total of PLN 164 million (about $56 million) for jointly setting Mastercard's and Visa's interchange fees.

In December 2010, Visa reached a settlement with the European Union in yet another antitrust case, promising to reduce debit card payments to 0.2 percent of a purchase. A senior official from the European Central Bank called for a break-up of the Visa/Mastercard duopoly by creation of a new European debit card for use in the Single Euro Payments Area (SEPA). After Visa's blocking of payments to WikiLeaks, members of the European Parliament expressed concern that payments from European citizens to a European corporation could apparently be blocked by the US, and called for a further reduction in the dominance of Visa and Mastercard in the European payment system.

===== High swipe fees in Poland =====
Visa's interchange fee of 1.5–1.6% in Poland started discussion about the need for increased government regulation surrounding the topic. The high fees encouraged merchants to create new payment systems, which avoid using Visa as a middleman. For example, mobile applications were created by major banks, proprietary payment systems were created by franchises, and public transport authorities created ticketing systems.

===== UK Payment System Regulator =====
In May 2024, the UK Payment Systems Regulator (PSR) proposed new rules requiring Visa and Mastercard to increase transparency regarding the fees they charge merchants. The proposed regulations mandate that the two companies, regularly disclose detailed financial information to the PSR. The regulations also require Visa and Mastercard to consult with merchants and retailers before implementing any fee changes.

The proposal followed a PSR review revealing that Visa and Mastercard had raised their scheme and processing fees by more than 30% in real terms over the previous five years. Despite these increases, the PSR found limited evidence that service quality had improved proportionately.

===== European Commission investigation into scheme fees =====
In November 2024, the European Commission launched a further investigation into whether the scheme fees imposed by Visa and Mastercard impact negatively on retailers. Some retailers had in recent years complained about the fees, citing a lack of transparency. The Commission took its investigation further in June 2025, asking for a retailer view and for comments from the card operators about whether "a standardized summary of fees" would help to promote transparency.

== Corporate affairs ==
=== Headquarters ===
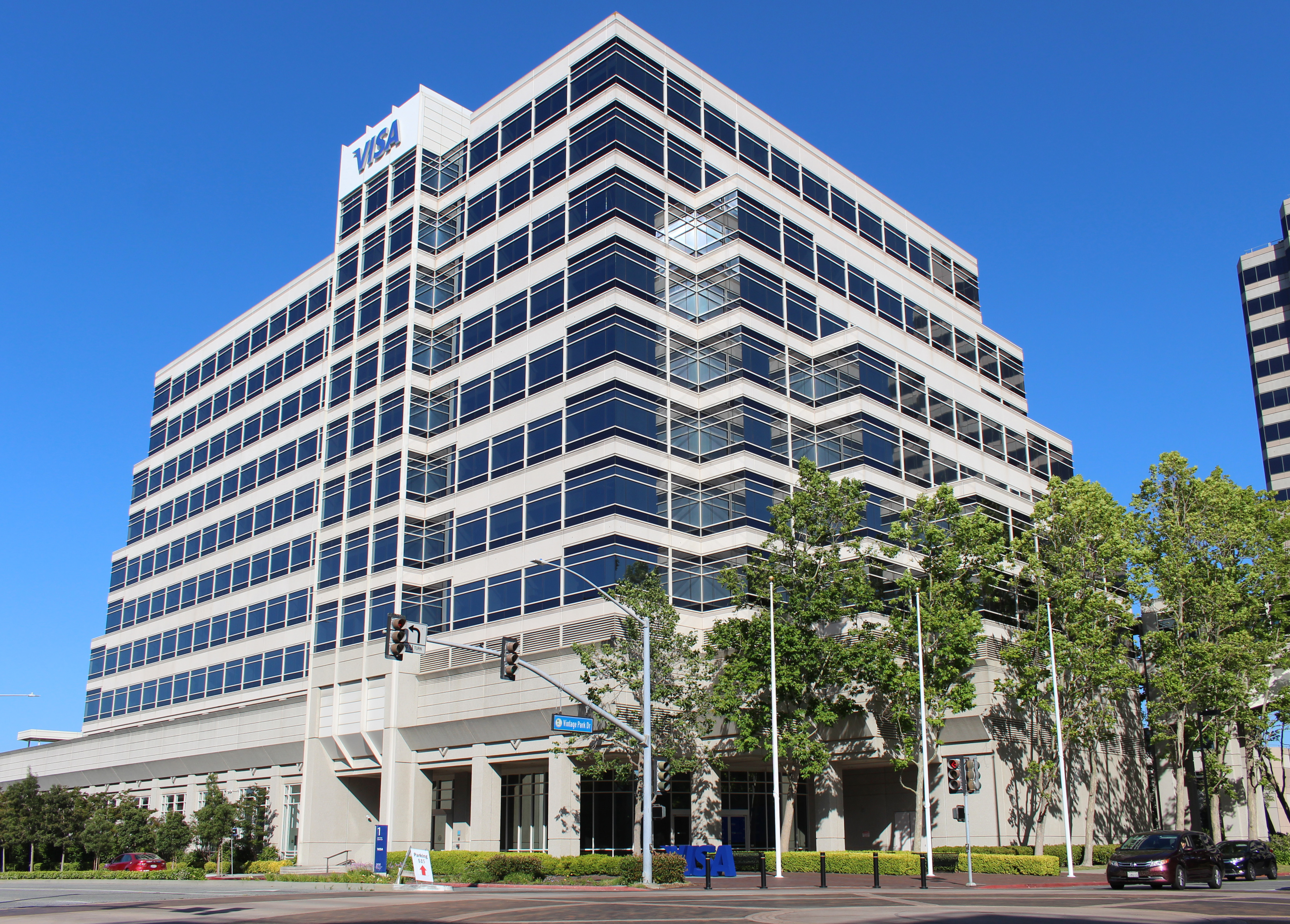
Former headquarters building in Foster City, now a branch office campus

Visa was traditionally headquartered in San Francisco until 1985, when it moved to San Mateo. Around 1993, Visa began consolidating various scattered offices in San Mateo to a location in nearby Foster City. Visa became Foster City's largest employer.

In 2009, Visa moved its corporate headquarters back to San Francisco when it leased the top three floors of the 595 Market Street office building, although most of its employees remained at its Foster City campus. In 2012, Visa decided to consolidate its headquarters in Foster City where 3,100 of its 7,700 global workers are employed. Visa owns four buildings at the intersection of Metro Center Boulevard and Vintage Park Drive.

As of October 1, 2012, Visa's headquarters were located in Foster City. In December 2012, Visa Inc. confirmed that it will build a global information technology center off of the US 183 Expressway in northwest Austin, Texas. By 2019, Visa had leased space in four buildings near Austin and employed nearly 2,000 people.

On November 6, 2019, Visa announced plans to move its headquarters back to San Francisco by 2024 upon completion of a new "13-story, 300,000-square-foot building". Visa also announced that it would redesign its current four-building complex in Foster City to 575,000 square feet, for offices for 3,000 employees in its product and technology teams. The existing complex has over 970,000 square feet of space, but Visa declined to explain how it would dispose of almost 400,000 square feet of excess space.

On June 6, 2024, Visa opened its new headquarters building at 300 Toni Stone Crossing in the Mission Rock development in San Francisco's Mission Bay neighborhood. The building was officially designated as the Market Support Center on its opening date, rather than a "headquarters" building as indicated in its original 2019 announcement. The company's 2024 filings with the U.S. Securities and Exchange Commission designate a post office box as its official address. Despite that ambiguity, the office of Visa's chief executive officer is based in the Market Support Center. The building features outdoor terraces, a rooftop deck, and views of San Francisco Giants baseball games and other events at Oracle Park across McCovey Cove.

In July 2026, Visa announced plans to reduce approximately 7% of its global workforce as part of an organizational restructuring.

== Operations ==
Visa offers through its issuing members the following types of cards:

- Debit cards (pay from a checking/savings account)
- Credit cards (pay monthly payments with or without interest depending on a customer paying on time)
- Prepaid cards (pay from a cash account that has no check writing privileges)

Visa operates the Plus automated teller machine network and the Interlink EFTPOS point-of-sale network, which facilitate the "debit" protocol used with debit cards and prepaid cards. They also provide commercial payment solutions for small businesses, midsize and large corporations, and governments. In October 2026, Visa got approval from China's central bank to set up a business that would allow it to process bank card payments within the country.

Visa teamed with Apple in September 2014, to incorporate a new mobile wallet feature into Apple's new iPhone models, enabling users to more readily use their Visa, and other credit/debit cards.

=== Operating regulations ===
Visa has a set of rules that govern the participation of financial institutions in its payment system. Acquiring banks are responsible for ensuring that their merchants comply with the rules.

Rules address how a cardholder must be identified for security, how transactions may be denied by the bank, and how banks may cooperate for fraud prevention, and how to keep that identification and fraud protection standard and non-discriminatory. Other rules govern what creates an enforceable proof of authorization by the cardholder.

The rules generally prohibit merchants from imposing a minimum or maximum purchase amount in order to accept a Visa card and from charging cardholders a fee for using a Visa card, but rules and laws vary by country.

==== Rules in the United States ====
Court decisions, legal settlements, and state statutes regulating surcharges and fees vary across the United States. It is illegal in three U.S. states and one territory (Connecticut, Massachusetts, Maine, and Puerto Rico) for merchants to impose surcharges for the use of a credit card. In those U.S. states where surcharges are permitted by law, merchants wishing to apply surcharges are required to abide by rules set by Visa.

Visa permits merchants to ask for photo ID, although the merchant rule book states that merchants are not generally allowed to require photo ID to complete a transaction. However, Visa may grant a merchant permission to require photo ID for purposes of fraud control.

The Dodd–Frank Act allows U.S. merchants to set a minimum purchase amount on credit card transactions, not to exceed $10.

==== Rules outside the United States ====
Some countries have banned the no-surcharge rule, most notably in Australia retailers may apply surcharges to any credit-card transaction, Visa or otherwise. In the UK the law was changed in January 2018 to prevent retailers from adding a surcharge to a transaction as per 'The Consumer Rights (Payment Surcharges) Regulations 2012'.

==== Transaction security ====
Other complications include the addition of exceptions for non-signed purchases by telephone or on the Internet and an additional security system called "Verified by Visa" for purchases on the Internet.

In September 2014, Visa Inc, launched a new service to replace account information on plastic cards with tokens – a digital account number.

== Products ==
=== Visa Credit Cards ===
Depending on the geographical location, Visa card issuers issue the following tiers of cards, from the lowest to the highest:

- Traditional/Classic/Standard
- Gold
- Platinum
- Premier (France only)
- Signature (Worldwide except Canada)
- Infinite
- Infinite Privilege (Canada, Brazil, Kuwait, UAE only)
- Infiinite Private (Brazil only)

=== Visa Debit ===
This is the standard Visa-branded debit card.

=== Visa Electron ===
A Visa-branded debit card issued worldwide since the 1990s. Its distinguishing feature is that it does not allow "card not present" transactions while its floor limit is set to zero, which triggers automatic authorisation of each transaction with the issuing bank and effectively makes it impossible for the user to overdraw the account. The card has often been issued to younger customers or those who may pose a risk of overdrawing the account. Since mid-2000s, the card has mostly been replaced by Visa Debit.

=== Visa Cash ===
A Visa-branded stored-value card.

=== Visa Contactless (Visa payWave) ===
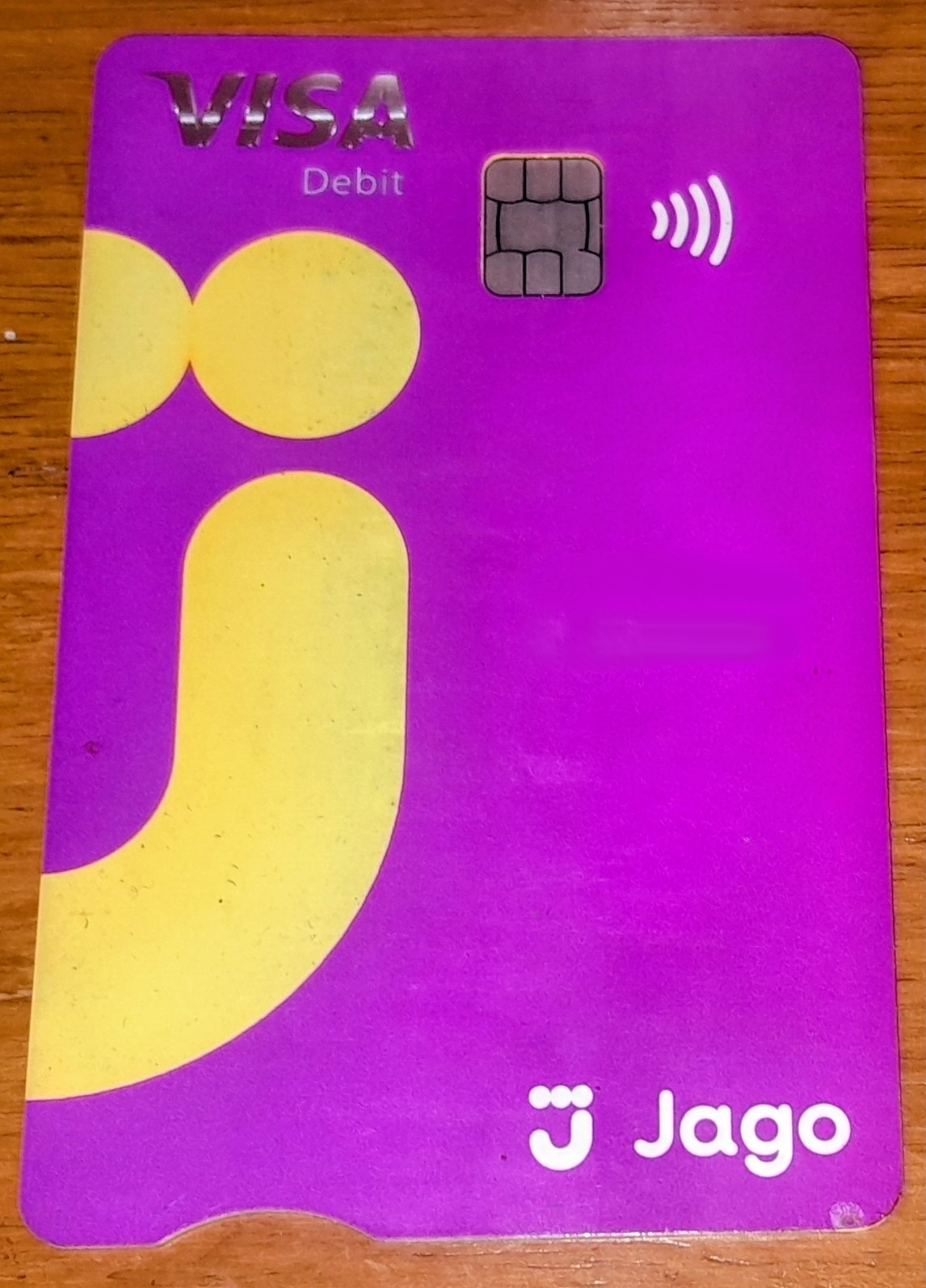
Visa Debit card with Contactless capability

In September 2007, Visa introduced Visa payWave (later known as Visa Contactless), a contactless payment technology feature that allows cardholders to wave their card in front of contactless payment terminals without the need to physically swipe or insert the card into a point-of-sale device. This is similar to the Mastercard Contactless service and the American Express ExpressPay, with both using RFID technology. All of them uses the same EMV Contactless logo to denote the capability of the card.

In Europe, Visa has introduced the V Pay card, which is a chip-only and PIN-only debit card. In Australia, take up has been the highest in the world, with more than 50% of in store Visa transactions made by Visa payWave in 2016.

=== mVisa ===
mVisa is a mobile payment app allowing payment via smartphones using QR code. This QR code payment method was first introduced in India in 2015. It was later expanded to a number of other countries, including in Africa and South East Asia.

=== Visa Checkout ===
In 2013, Visa launched Visa Checkout, an online payment system that removes the need to share card details with retailers. The Visa Checkout service allows users to enter all their personal details and card information, then use a single username and password to make purchases from online retailers. The service works with Visa credit, debit, and prepaid cards. On November 27, 2013, V.me went live in the UK, France, Spain and Poland, with Nationwide Building Society being the first financial institution in Britain to support it, although Nationwide subsequently withdrew this service in 2016.

=== Visa Commerce Network ===
After Visa's acquisition of TrialPay on February 27, 2015, Visa created the Visa Commerce Network. Visa Commerce Network provides businesses the ability to provide rewards, through the use of loyalty programs.

=== Value-Added Services (VAS) ===
Visa’s Value-Added Services (VAS) are technology-based products addressing the security and efficiency of digital payments. These services include fraud protection, transaction authentication, dispute management, and payment data analysis.

== Trademark and design ==
=== Logo design ===
The blue and gold in Visa's logo were chosen to represent the blue sky and gold-colored hills of California, where the Bank of America was founded.

In 2005, Visa changed its logo, removing the horizontal stripes in favor of a simple white background with the name Visa in blue with an orange flick on the 'V'. The orange flick was removed in favor of the logo being a solid blue gradient in 2014 and solid blue in 2021. In 2015, the gold and blue stripes were restored as card branding on Visa Debit and Visa Electron, although not as the company's logotype.

=== Card design ===
The hologram

In 1983, most Visa cards around the world began to feature a hologram of a dove on its face, generally under the last four digits of the Visa number. This was implemented as a security feature – true holograms would appear three-dimensional and the image would change as the card was turned. At the same time, the Visa logo, which had previously covered the whole card face, was reduced in size to a strip on the card's right incorporating the hologram. This allowed issuing banks to customize the appearance of the card. Similar changes were implemented with MasterCard cards. Today, cards may be co-branded with various merchants, airlines, etc., and marketed as "reward cards".

On older Visa cards, holding the face of the card under an ultraviolet light will reveal the dove picture, dubbed the Ultra-Sensitive Dove, as an additional security test. (On newer Visa cards, the UV dove is replaced by a small V over the Visa logo.)

Beginning in 2005, the Visa standard was changed to allow for the hologram to be placed on the back of the card, or to be replaced with a holographic magnetic stripe ("HoloMag"). The HoloMag card was shown to occasionally cause interference with card readers, so Visa eventually withdrew designs of HoloMag cards and reverted to traditional magnetic strips.

== Signatures ==
Visa made a statement on January 12, 2018, that the signature requirement would become optional for all EMV contact or contactless chip-enabled merchants in North America starting in April 2018. It was noted that the signatures are no longer necessary to fight fraud and the fraud capabilities have advanced allowing this elimination leading to a faster in-store purchase experience. Visa was the last of the major credit card issuers to relax the signature requirements. The first to eliminate the signature was MasterCard Inc. followed by Discover Financial Services and American Express Co.

== Sponsorships ==
=== Olympics and Paralympics ===
- Visa has been a worldwide sponsor of the Olympic Games since 1986 and the International Paralympic Committee since 2002. Visa is the only card accepted at all Olympic and Paralympic venues. Its current contract with the International Olympic Committee and International Paralympic Committee as the exclusive services sponsor will continue through 2032 and 2020 respectively. This includes the Singapore 2010 Youth Olympic Games, London 2012 Olympic Games, the Sochi 2014 Olympic Winter Games, the Rio de Janeiro 2016 Olympic Games, the 2018 PyeongChang Olympic Winter Games, the Tokyo 2020 Olympic Games, the Beijing 2022 Olympic Winter Games and the Paris 2024 Olympic Games.
- In 2002, Visa became the first global sponsor of the IPC. Visa extended its partnership with the International Paralympic Committee through 2020, which includes the 2010 Vancouver Paralympic Winter Games, the 2012 London Paralympic Games, 2014 Sochi Paralympic Games, 2018 Pyeongchang Paralympic Games, 2020 Tokyo Paralympic Games, 2022 Beijing Paralympic Games and 2024 Paris Paralympic Games.

=== Others ===
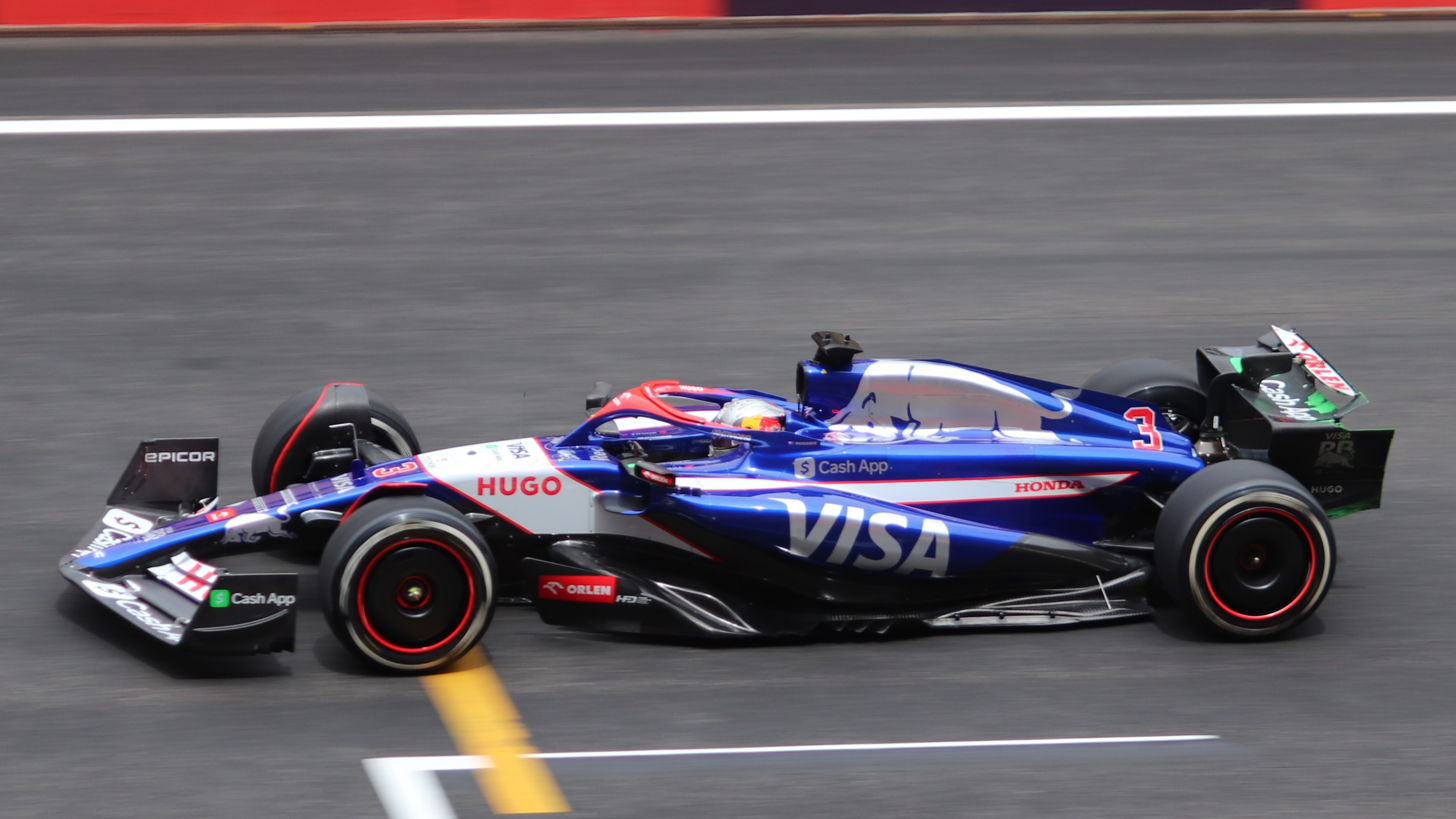
Visa Cash App RB Formula One Team

- Visa was the jersey sponsor of Argentina's national basketball team at the 2015 FIBA Americas Championship in Mexico City.
- Visa is the shirt sponsor for the Argentina national rugby union team, nicknamed the Pumas. Also, Visa sponsors the Copa Libertadores and the Copa Sudamericana, the most important football club tournaments in South America.
- Since 1995, Visa has sponsored the U.S. National Football League (NFL) and a number of NFL teams, including the San Francisco 49ers whose practice jerseys display the Visa logo. Visa's sponsorship of the NFL extended through the 2014 season.
- Until 2005, Visa was the exclusive sponsor of the Triple Crown thoroughbred tournament.
- Visa sponsored the Rugby World Cup first from the 1995 Rugby World Cup was held in South Africa until 12 years later, when the 2007 Rugby World Cup, was held in France.
- In 2007, Visa became the sponsor of the 2010 FIFA World Cup in South Africa. The FIFA partnership provides Visa with global rights to a broad range of FIFA activities – including both the 2010 and 2014 FIFA World Cup and the FIFA Women's World Cup.
- Starting from the 2012 season, Visa became a partner of the Caterham F1 Team. Visa is also known for motorsport sponsorship in the past: it sponsored PacWest Racing's IndyCar team in 1995 and 1996, with drivers Danny Sullivan and Mark Blundell respectively.
- Visa was a jersey sponsor of professional gaming (esports) team SK Gaming for 2017
- Visa is the main sponsor of the Argentine Hockey Confederation. The Visa logo is present on both the men's and women's playing kits.
- Visa and Cash App are the co-title sponsors of the rebranded Scuderia AlphaTauri Formula One team as Visa Cash App RB from 2024 onwards and will also appear in the team's F1 Academy entry. Visa also signed a sponsorship deal with Red Bull Racing.

== See also ==
- RuPay
- UnionPay
- CIBIL
- Damage waiver
- Entrust Bankcard
- Visa Buxx
- Visa Debit
- Visa Electron
