= Touchatag =

RFID service

Touchatag (previously TikiTag) was an RFID service for consumers, application developers and operators/enterprises created by Alcatel-Lucent. Consumers could use RFID tags to trigger what touchatag called Applications, which could include opening a webpage, sending a text message, shutting down the computer, or running a custom application created through the software's API, via the application developer network. Touchatag applications were also compatible with NFC enabled phones like the Nokia 6212. TikiTag was launched as an open beta on October 1, 2008. And it was rebranded to touchatag on February 15, 2009. Touchatag also sold RFID hardware, like a starter package with 1 USB RFID reader and 10 RFID tags (stickers), for which the client software was compatible with Windows XP and Vista, along with Mac OS X 10.4 and up. Touchatag was carried by Amazon.com, ThinkGeek, Firebox.com and getDigital.de along with Touchatag's own Online Store. Touchatag also marketed their products' underlying technology for enterprise and operator solutions. Touchatag announced an agreement with Belgacom PingPing on jointly developing the contactless market and announced a commercial pilot with Accor Services. On June 27, 2012, the Touchatag team has announced the shutdown of the project. inviting users to use IOTOPE "a similar open source Internet Of Things service" which itself has no apparent activity since November 2012.

== Service ==
Touchatag's core offering was the touchatag service, based on the "application correlation service" and allowed tag, reader and application management. For consumers, the web interface allowed to link RFID tags (and 2D barcode tags, more precisely QR Code) to applications. Application developers could use the correlation API to use the ACS functionalities to create contactless applications. For businesses, this ACS was extended with an RFID/NFC tag and reader catalogue, and applications like loyalty, interactive advertising and couponing.

== Hardware ==
The reader provided was an ACR122U Tag Reader, from Advanced Card Systems. The tags shipped with the reader were MiFare Ultralight tags.

== Software support ==
=== Official clients ===
Touchatag hardware was supported by its makers on Microsoft Windows and Mac OS X platforms, and required registration on the website to work. An unsupported application was also available for Linux platforms. Like the Mac OS X application, the Linux application used PCSC-Lite for hardware access.

=== Unofficial clients ===
- TagEventor (no apparent activity since 2011) is an open-source client from the Educational Facts association that works on Linux platforms, and does not use the web service from touchatag. It uses the PCSC-Lite daemon and can be run in foreground or daemon mode to make tag events available to user-space applications.

=== Programming libraries ===
- touchatag-processing is a Processing library from Augusto Esteves that allows users to connect and read from multiple touchatag readers on the Windows platform. This library works with simply the reader's drivers, so there's no need to install any official or unofficial clients.

== See also ==
- RFID
- NFC
- contactless payment
- contactless smart card
- Internet of Things
- Future Technology of the world
