= Pingping (payment) =

Pingping is an electronic micropayment system available in Belgium which allows users to make cashless purchases via a near-field communication (NFC) card or a using text messaging on a mobile phone. PingPing was founded by the Belgian telecom operator Belgacom in March 2009 and the technology was developed by Tunz, a mobile payments specialist which Belgacom acquired a 40% stake in PingPing. The system was subsequently acquired by Alfa-Zet Systems, a cashless payment specialist in Belgium and Holland.
