= FreedomPay =

American company

- Type: Private
- Industry: Payments platform as a service
- Genre: Payments Gateway
- Founded: Philadelphia, 2000
- Founder: Tom Durovsik, CEO
- Headquarters: Philadelphia, Pennsylvania, USA
- Key people: Tom Durovsik, CEO; Christopher Kronenthal, President & CTO
- Products: FreedomPay Commerce Platform
- Owner: Tom Durovsik
- Website: www.freedompay.com

FreedomPay is a company that provides payment platform as a service. It was founded in 2000 and is currently located in Philadelphia, Pennsylvania. In early 2000, FreedomPay launched mobile payment "proof of concepts" with enterprises such as McDonald's, Bank of America and Visa. Later in 2004, FreedomPay delivered a closed loop payment system for stored value and voucher systems to the food service industry.

== History ==
FreedomPay was founded by Thomas Durovsik in 2000.

In 2007, FreedomPay developed a gateway for credit card processing (FreeWay) that captures detailed transaction data. That data can be mined for real time intelligence from disparate systems, giving merchants insight into their sales. Using that data, FreedomPay launched a cloud-based platform as a service (PaaS) and a first generation incentive platform.

In 2013, FreedomPay was selected by Microsoft as its commerce platform partner for the global banking and retail sectors.

In 2014, FreedomPay earned PCI validation for its point-to-point encryption solution (P2PE). FreedomPay was the first fully functional platform solution in North America to achieve PCI validation, including support for NFC and EMV payments.

In 2023, Amazon Web Services integrated Amazon One with the company’s commerce technology platform.

Partners with QikServe (since 2018), J.P. Morgan, Elavon (2024), Citi Teams, and WorldPay.

== Products ==
=== FreedomPay Commerce Platform ===
The FreedomPay platform is a commerce solution that includes mobile payment capabilities, high-level security, incentive technologies, and business intelligence that integrates with live POS systems.

=== Mobile payments and incentives ===
The mobile application connects consumers’ smartphones to the FreedomPay commerce platform at physical merchants. In addition to allowing mobile payments through the use of QR codes, the mobile app delivers targeted incentives, replaces loyalty cards, and provides access to electronic copies of receipts.

Merchants utilizing the FreedomPay Commerce Platform have the ability to create offers and loyalty programs. These offers can target users based on a number of criteria, including purchase history as well as user-input information. Users within the merchant-chosen distance can see active incentives within the mobile application and apply them to their bill at checkout.

=== Stored Value ===
FreedomPay Stored Value is a cashless payment solution, that provides corporate clients such as universities, hospitals, and corporate cafeterias with an option for stored value spending. The online portal for Stored Value allows FreedomPay clients to use that information for a number of purposes, from distributing basic monetary-value vouchers to rewards based on eating habits.

== Partnerships ==
FreedomPay maintains partnerships with enterprises including:

- Microsoft
- MICROS
- HID
- Compass Group
- Sodexo
- Aramark
