= RioCard =

Transport smartcard system in Brazil

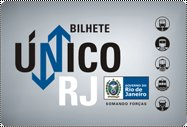
- Location: Rio de Janeiro, Brazil
- Launched: 2005
- Currency: BRL
- Website: www.cartaoriocard.com.br

The RioCard (Bilhete Único) is a smartcard system used in the transport system of Rio de Janeiro state, Brazil. The card is contactless and uses MIFARE technology. It is a form of electronic payment produced and distributed by the Fetranspor company, in cooperation with Itaú bank. Its installation was seen as strengthening Brazil's connection with the Open Standard for Public Transport (OSPT) Alliance.

In October 2013, Rio de Janeiro launched a trial run for this ticket to be run on smartphones, using near field communication (NFC) technology. Around 200 users of the ticket on buses, trains and ferries were selected for the trial, which involves putting a Motorola Razr D3 within a few inches of the reader terminal. Users can then check the balance of their card. Soon, one will be able to prepay fares by using one's phone.

== Conventional transportation (Transporte Convencional) ==
Created for commuters (home-work-home), this card can be requested over the Internet or in person and is free of charge, with the minimum credits value of R$40.00 (approximately US$17). This card can be used for any mode of transportation (bus, ferry, subway, train) but can only be used once per trip at a maximum of eight times per day. Requests to add value to the card can only be done online or in RioCard stores, or in RioCard ATMs. Use of the card is limited to the city in which the card was activated or used at least three times in the past 30 days.

== Rapid transit (Transporte Rápido) ==
This card is intended for infrequent commutes or people who want to acquire their card more quickly. It is sold at Unibanco locations and can only be purchased with cash. It can be loaded with only fixed amounts of R$40 or R$80 (approximately US$17 or US$34) and cannot be re-loaded; repeat users must purchase a new card once the balance is zero or the remaining credit is insufficient for passage. This card is only intended for use on the most inexpensive form of transportation available. Use in other modes of transportation will require complementary payment in another form. It can be used toward any mode of transportation (bus, ferry, subway, train) but can only be used once per trip at a maximum of eight times per day.

== Express (Expresso) ==
This monetary card is intended for passengers who want more flexibility for their transport options. It is accepted on buses, ferries, and SuperVia trains but it is only accepted on subways if the RioCard (Bilhete Único) is activated. Express cards are available for purchase at Itaú locations, banks, pharmacies, and online. Cards come pre-filled with either R$40 or R$80 and value can be re-added online on a card with a zero balance or with insufficient funds for passage. This card is only intended for use on the most inexpensive form of transportation available. Use in other modes of transportation will require complementary payment in another form.

== Integrated (Integração) ==
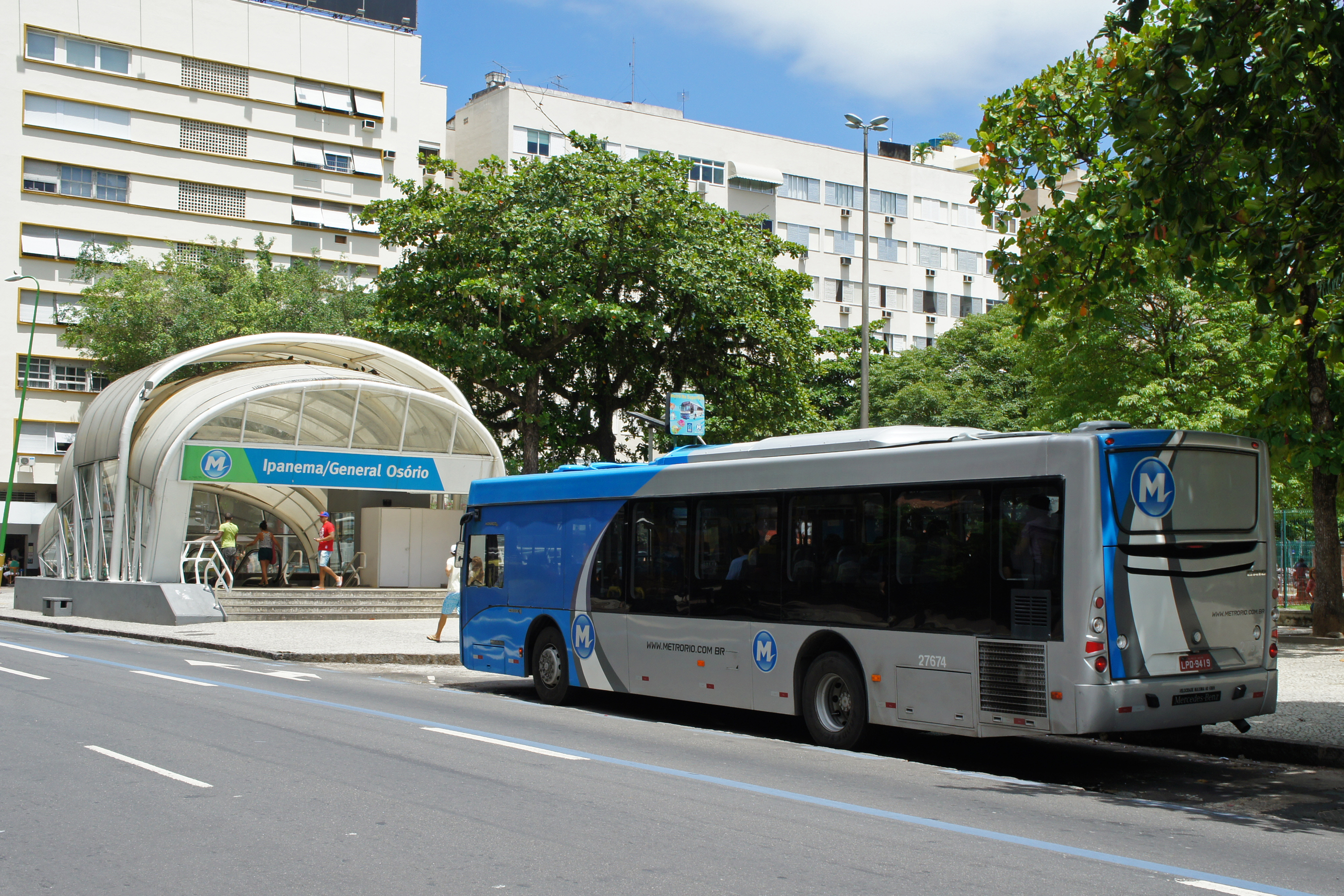
Integrated bus/Metro line in Rio de Janeiro city

Created exclusively for commuters who travel using multiple modes of transportation and don't possess other forms of the RioCard, the integrated card allows the combination of several modes of transit into one route. This card can be used in up to three kinds of transportation while only deducting a single, fixed price.

Route options include:

- Integrated Route A: Commuter Rail > Municipal bus in Rio de Janeiro (from the stations below)
- Integrated Route AB: Cocotá Ferry > Municipal bus in Rio de Janeiro (from Cocotá station)
- Integrated Route AC: Niterói Ferry > Municipal bus in Rio de Janeiro (from Niterói station)
- Integrated Route AD: Commuter Rail > Bus in the Baixada Fluminense (from the stations below)
- Integrated Bus-Bus to Niterói: The use of two buses is permitted in the city of Niterói

Bus lines included in this depart from: Central, São Cristóvão, Cascadura, Madureira, Mercadão de Madureira, Nova Iguaçu, Belford Roxo, Bangu, Campo Grande and Santa Cruz

== Special passengers (Passe Especial) ==
- Students: Service is provided for public school students in the city of Rio de Janeiro (the city of Rio does not provide service for students enrolled in other institutions), and as long as they are wearing a school uniform, the card permits their passage at no cost. This service is suspended when school is not in session and when students cease to be enrolled.
- Senior citizens: Service is provided for the elderly (those above the age of 65) without limitation and their right to free passage is legally mandated and protected.
- Disabled: Service is also provided without charge to those with chronic illnesses or physical disabilities.

== Single ticket (Bilhete Único) in the state of Rio de Janeiro ==
On December 29, 2009, Law 5628 established the Bilhete Único in the Rio de Janeiro Metropolitan Region. The "Bilhete Único RJ" costs R$5.25 (US$2.19) and allows the purchaser to utilize up to two different modes of transportation—bus, van, train, ferry, or subway—within three hours as long as one of them is "integrated" with other municipalities. This program also benefits those using inter-municipal transportation that costs more than the standard fare. The Bilhete Único RJ can be incorporated with any form of the RioCard. Purchase of the Bilhete Único RJ can be made at any ticketing area for trains, subways, and ferries, as well as in Fetranspor locations and Loja Virtual do Bilhete Único RJ. However, the Bilhete Único RJ cannot be used immediately after purchase. Activation requires a verification of the user's CPF and 48 hours before it is enabled. Air-conditioned buses are not included in this program.

== Bilhete Único Carioca (Carioca Single ticket) ==
The Bilhete Único Carioca offers a rate that "integrates" the use of two municipal bus lines within the city of Rio de Janeiro. Users can ride up to two municipal buses within two hours for R$3.00 (US$1.25). The card can be used on municipal bus lines within the city of Rio de Janeiro operated by: Internorte, Intersul, Transcarioca e Santa Cruz. Air-conditioned buses are not included in this program. For trips that are not integrated, the card can be used without restriction, enabling the user to pay for various passages on the same vehicle and the normal fare will be discounted. It can be used in any bus line within the state of Rio de Janeiro, regardless of the cost of the fare.

== Bilhete Único Niterói (Single ticket Niterói) ==
According to the Law 2851 enacted in 2011, the Bilhete Único Niterói offers a discounted rate for the integration of municipal buses in the city of Niterói. The electronic card allows users to ride up to two municipal buses within two hours for R$3.90 (US$1.25). Return trips should be made at a minimum of two hours after the card is first scanned in order to utilize the discounted rate. This card can only be used two times per day. Since 2012 air-conditioned buses are included in this program. If used two times in a row on the same bus line, the card will be debited two normal fares. It is now accepted in other modes of transportation, including the Ferry and the Rio de Janeiro Subway.

== See also ==
- Rio de Janeiro Metro
