= Floor limit =

A floor limit is the amount of money above which debit card or credit card transactions must be authorized online by their Issuing banks. The limit can vary from store to store. Floor limits have become less significant as credit cards & most of the debit cards started being processed electronically, and all transactions are typically authorized online by sending the Authorization request to their issuing banks.

== History ==
The term floor limit comes from the days when it was the maximum amount which could be approved on the floor (of the retailer), beyond which the cash register operator would have to call for approval.

Floor limits were of more significance when most credit card merchants processed transactions by taking a physical imprint of the card rather than electronically swiping the magnetic strip, and obtaining an authorization required time-consuming human intervention. With modern card readers, most merchants and banks will obtain an authorization even on very small charges, as it costs little to do so and helps protect against fraud. However, the concept of a floor limit may still come into play in certain cases. A few merchants still use the older system of taking a physical imprint of the card. Additionally, if the merchant or merchant's bank has trouble contacting the customer's bank due to computer network issues, transactions under a certain floor limit will still be approved electronically immediately.

Floor limits do not apply to certain types of debit card (such as Visa Electron and Solo), as these cards require authorization for every transaction to prevent the cardholder becoming overdrawn.

In India, the majority of the Automated Teller Machines (ATM) have been configured with Zero Floor Limit value, as a result of which all financial request transactions initiated from the ATM will be sent online to their issuing banks for the approval.

== Example ==
If a store has a floor limit of $30.00, a purchase costing $29.99 (or less) would not need to be authorized by the customer's bank through Online transaction at that very moment. However, a transaction of $30.00 (or more) would require Online authorization at that very moment to confirm that the customer has the necessary funds available in their bank account.

== Problems ==
A floor limit may cause an account to become overdrawn, even where the account holder does not have an authorized overdraft. In the EU the Payments Accounts Directive (S.I. No. 482/2016) provides for a basic bank account which is prohibited from having an agreed overdraft facility, however floor limits may force the account into an overdrawn position.
