= U-type =

U-type or Type U may refer to:

- U-type strand exchange, a mechanism for the formation of certain chromosome abnormalities
- the U-type manifold arrangement in plate heat exchanger design
- the Little Dancer Type U, a tram
- type U, a function symbol in formal logic
- unsigned C data types
