= Kagoshima City Transportation Bureau =

Public transportation authority of Kagoshima City, Japan

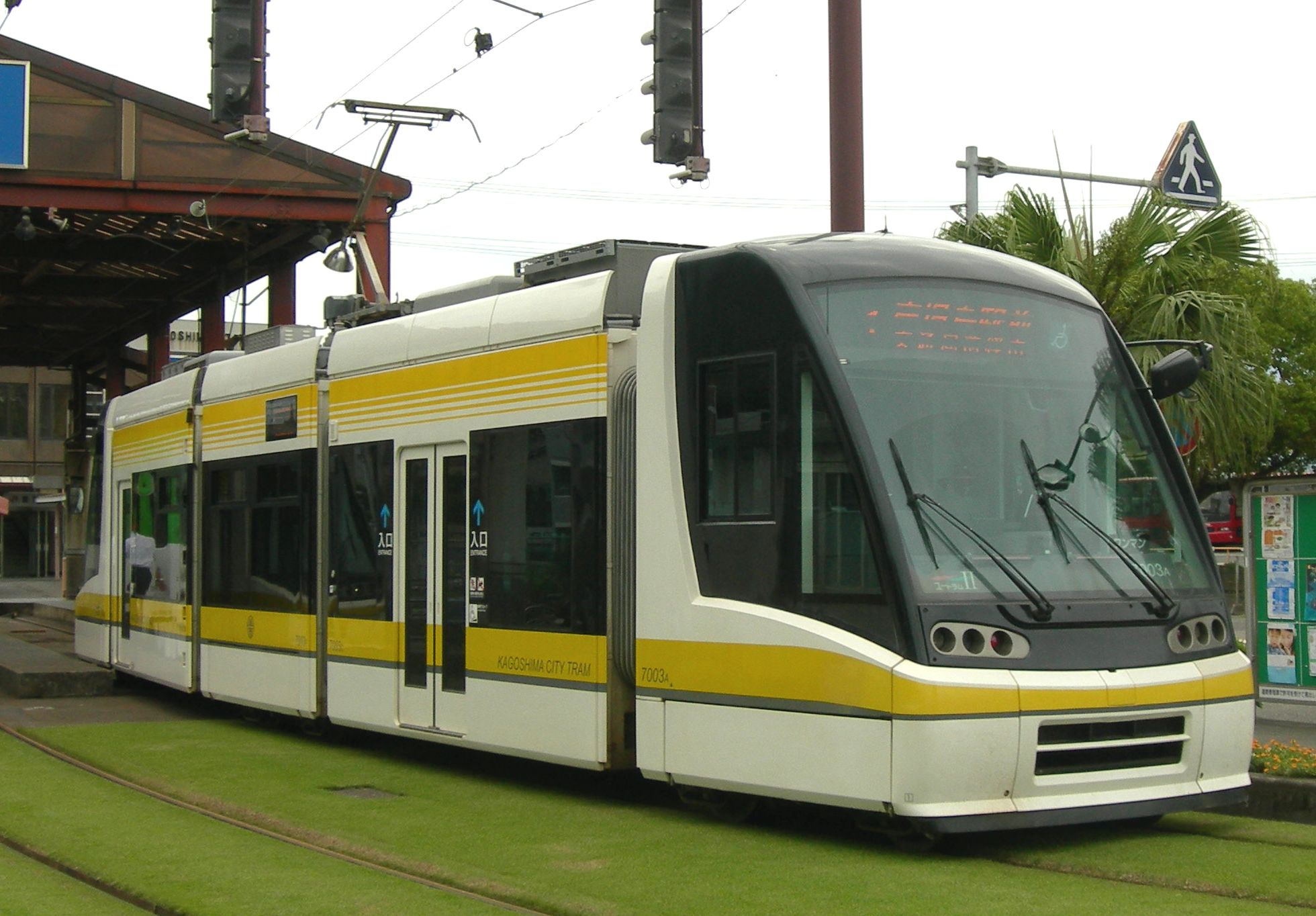
Type 7000 tramcar, known as the U-tram II.

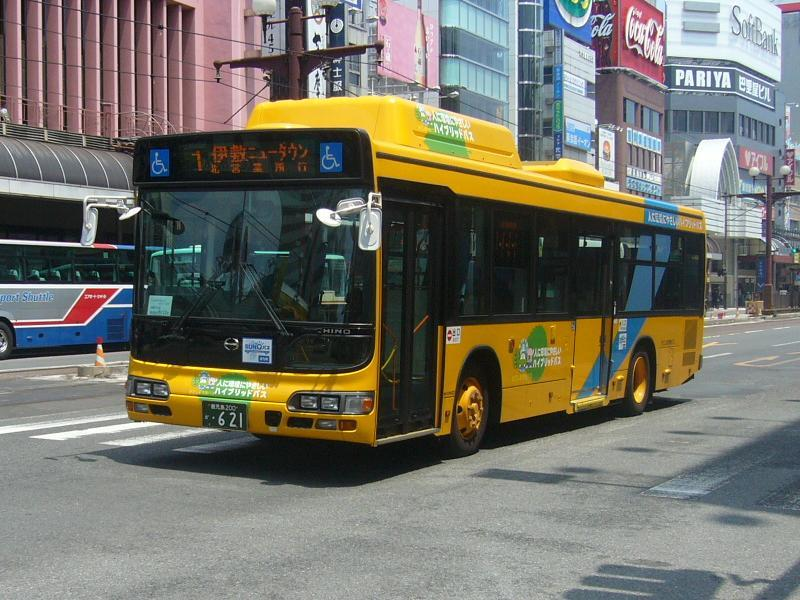
Kagoshima City Bus.

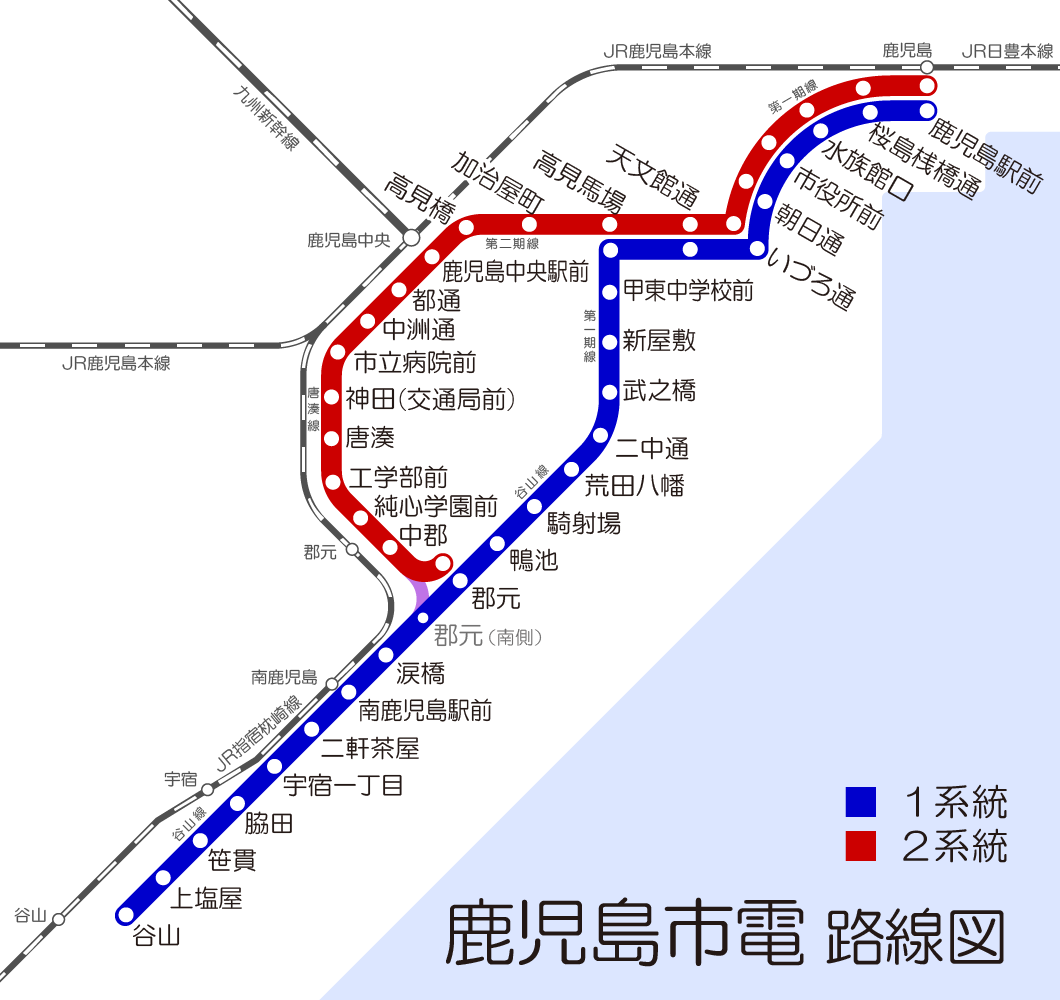
Current Kagoshima City Tram Map

The Kagoshima City Transportation Bureau (鹿児島市交通局, Kagoshima-shi Kōtsūkyoku) is a public transportation authority of Kagoshima City, Japan. The bureau operates trams and bus lines. From April 1, 2005, together with Nangoku Kōtsū and JR Kyūshū Bus, the bureau introduced RapiCa, a smart card ticketing system.

The bureau was founded in 1928 before acquiring control of the Kagoshima Electric Tramway (鹿児島電気軌道株式会社, Kagoshima denki kidō kabushikigaisha) for 4,963,775 yen and 78 sen in 1929. The new organisation inherited 51 electric trains and 3 freight cars.

== Kagoshima City Tram ==
Kagoshima City Tram (鹿児島市電, Kagoshima Shiden) is a modern tramway and heritage tramway. There are more than 10 million users annually.

=== History ===
==== Creation ====
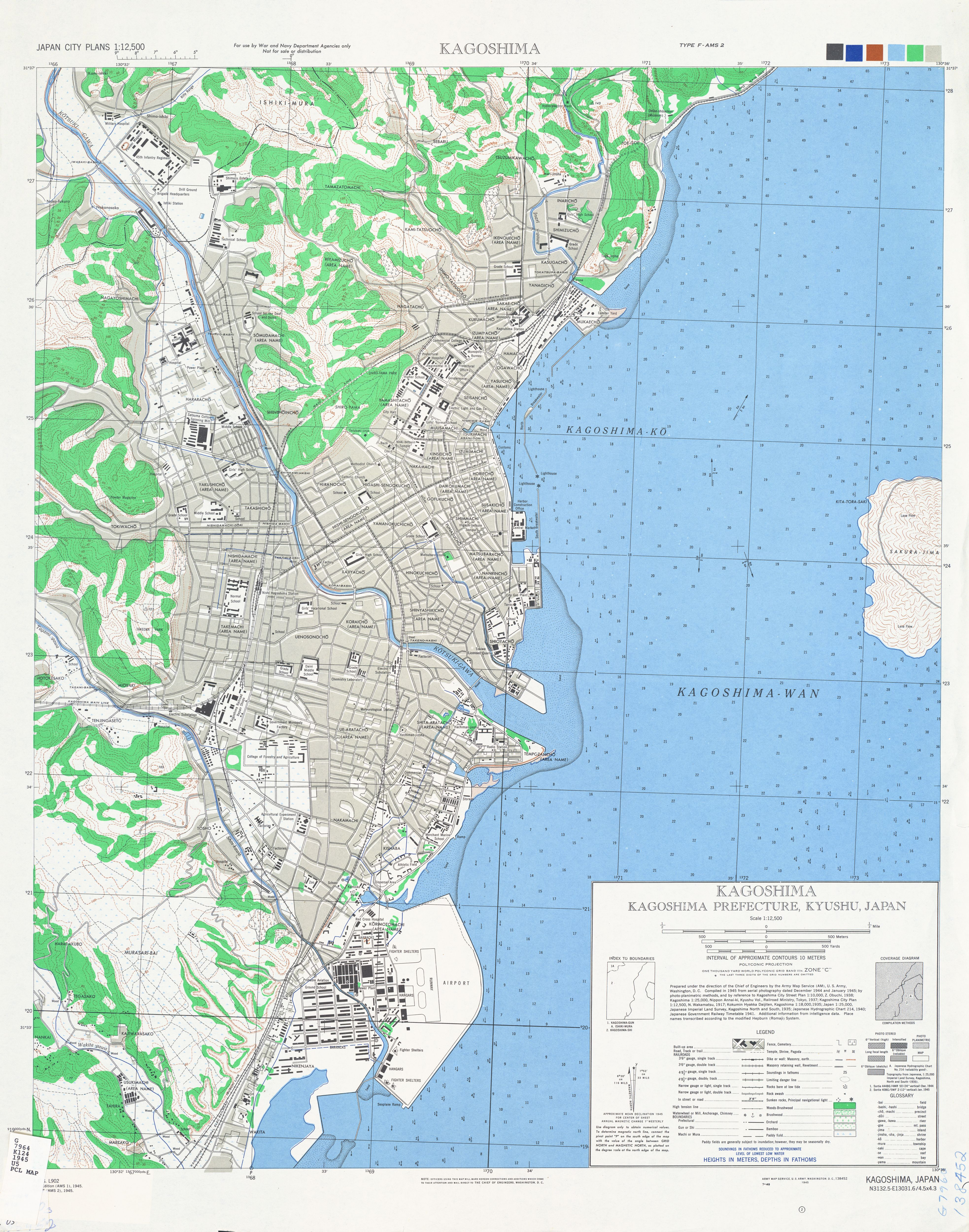
Kagoshima Transport Network in 1945

The first tram line was established in 1912.

In 1929, the Bureau acquired control of the Kagoshima Electric Tramway (鹿児島電気軌道株式会社, Kagoshima denki kidō kabushikigaisha) for 4,963,775 yen and 78 sen, moving towards public ownership.

==== World War Two ====
Due to air raids in 1945, only 3 out of 62 trains were left intact and operational.

==== Postwar ====
The ultra-low-floor train (U-Tram) began operating on January 15, 2002. Initially, three cars were introduced, with a further three vehicles added between May 2004 and March 2005. There are currently a total of nine vehicles on the line in operation.

Two articulated ultra-low-floor trains (Utram II) began operation on April 26, 2007.

On March 30, 2017, two ultra-low-floor trains (Utram III) began operating.

=== Lines and routes ===
- Lines: Officially, there are four lines with the total distance of 13.1 km.
  - Dai-Ikki-Line ("Phase 1 Line", 第一期線): Takenohashi — Kagoshima-Ekimae
  - Dai-Niki-Line ("Phase 2 Line", 第二期線): Takamibaba — Kagoshima-Chūō-Ekimae
  - Taniyama Line (谷山線): Takenohashi — Taniyama
  - Toso Line (唐湊線): Kagoshima-Chūō-Ekimae — Kōrimoto
- Routes: There are two routes regularly in service by using one or more lines above.

■ Route 1 (1系統): Kagoshima-Ekimae — Takamibaba — Takenohashi — Kōrimoto — Taniyama
■ Route 2 (2系統): Kagoshima-Ekimae — Takamibaba — Kagoshima-Chūō-Ekimae — Kōrimoto

Tramcars come once per five minutes generally, once per one minute in busier sections. The fare is ¥170 for all the sections.

=== Rolling Stock ===
Rolling Stock Name	Alternative Name	Capacity	Manufacturer	Number in Service		Started Passenger Operation	Ended Passenger Operation	Image
Rolling Stock Name	Alternative Name	Capacity	Manufacturer	Currently	Historically	Started Passenger Operation	Ended Passenger Operation	Image
Kagoshima Type 500	Tokyo City Electricity Bureau Type 400	96	Toyo Koki	1 (Flower Car)	at least 5, possibly 13	1955	2019	
Kagoshima Type 600	N/A	96	Hitachi Teikoku Sharyo Kogyo Naniwa Koki	10	16	1959	N/A	
Kagoshima Type 9700	N/A	62	Aruna Koki	2	2	1997	N/A	
Kagoshima Type 9500	Osaka City Transportation Bureau Type 2601 Kagoshima Type 800	62	Naniwa Koki Aruna Koki	15	15	1995	N/A	
Kagoshima Type 7000 (Utram II)	Little Dancer Type A5 Utram II	78	Alna Sharyo	4	4	2002	N/A	
Kagoshima Type 2100	N/A	62	Kyushu Railway Company (JR Kyushu)	11	11	1989	N/A	
Kagoshima Type 1000 (Utram)	Little Dancer Type A3 Utram	55	Alna Sharyo	9	9	2002	N/A	
Kagoshima Type 7500	Little Dancer Type X Utram III	68	Alna Sharyo	4	4	2017	N/A	

==== Modern ====
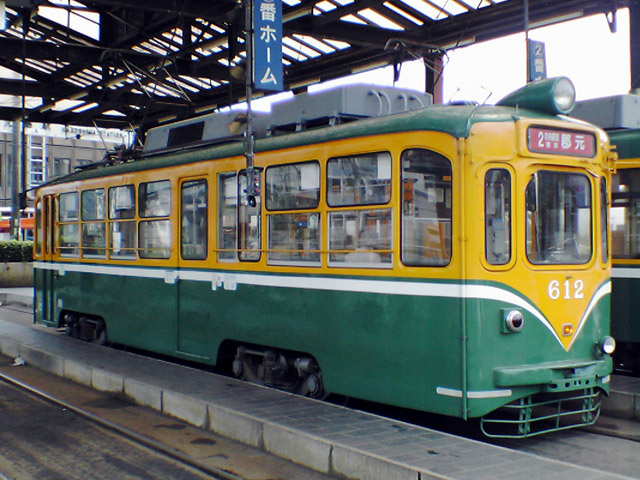
Kagoshima Type 600 (standard livery)

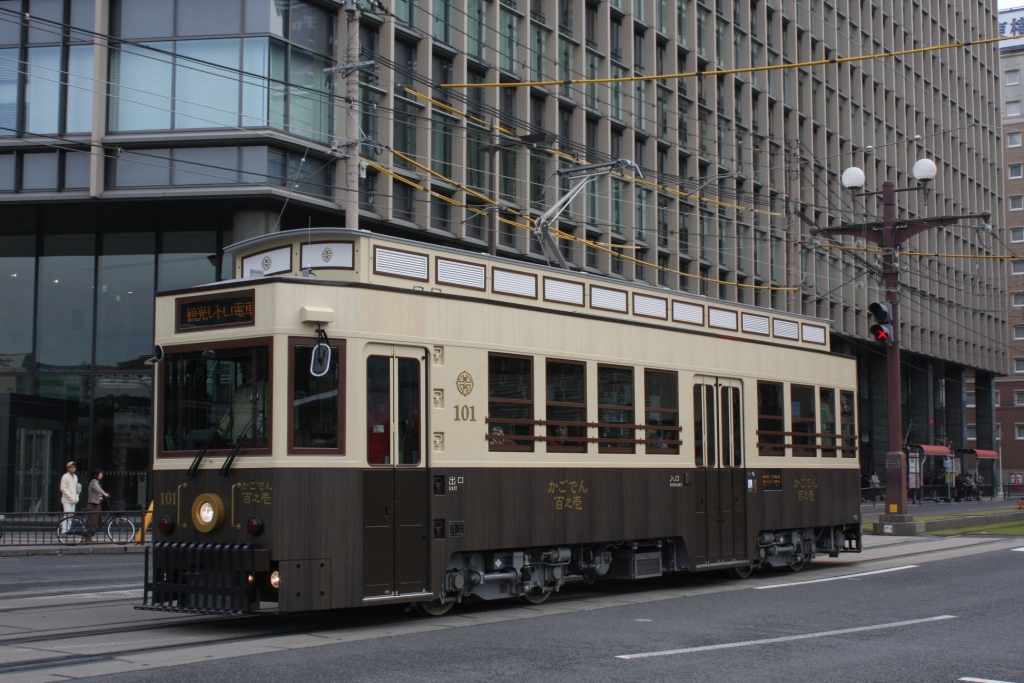
100th Anniversary "Kadogen" Tram

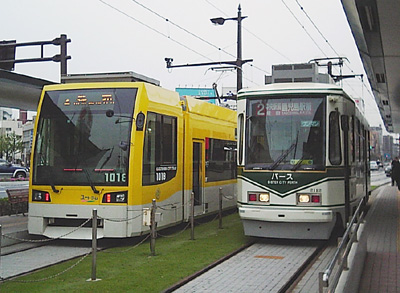
Kagoshima Type 1000 (Little Dancer Type A3) (Left) and Kagoshima Type 2110 (Right)

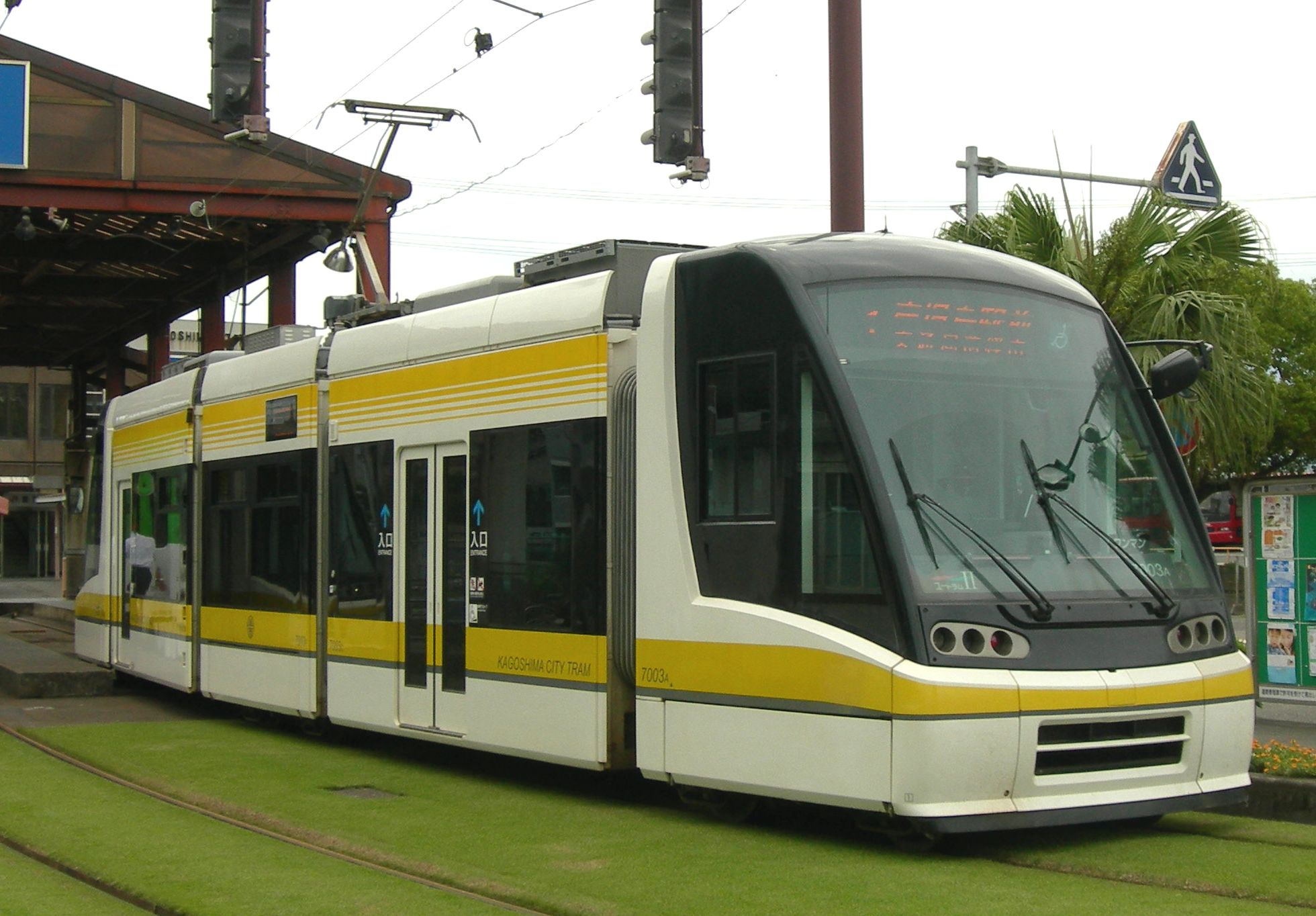
Kagoshima Type 7000 (Utram II) (Little Dancer Type A5)

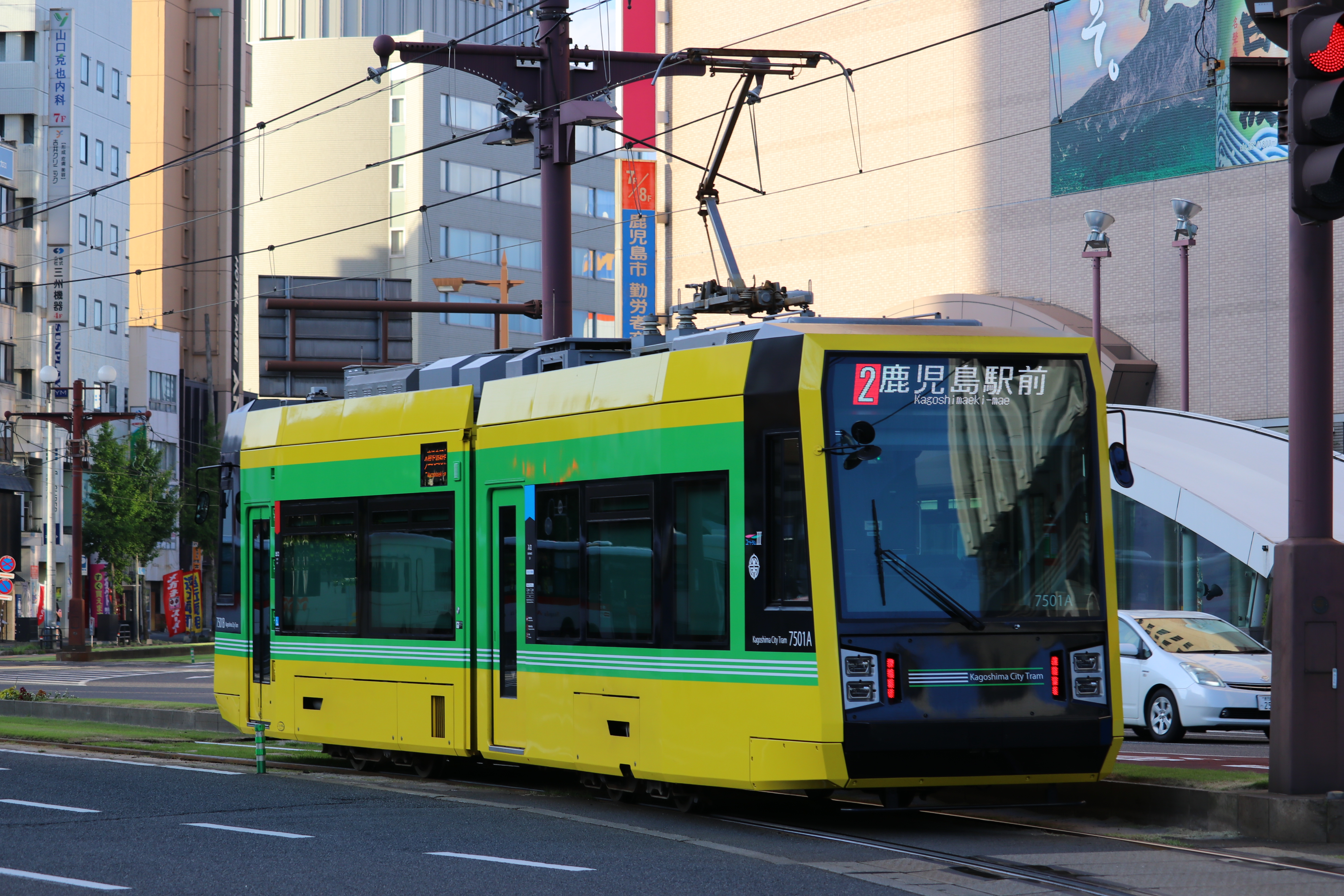
Kagoshima Type 7500 (Little Dancer Type X)

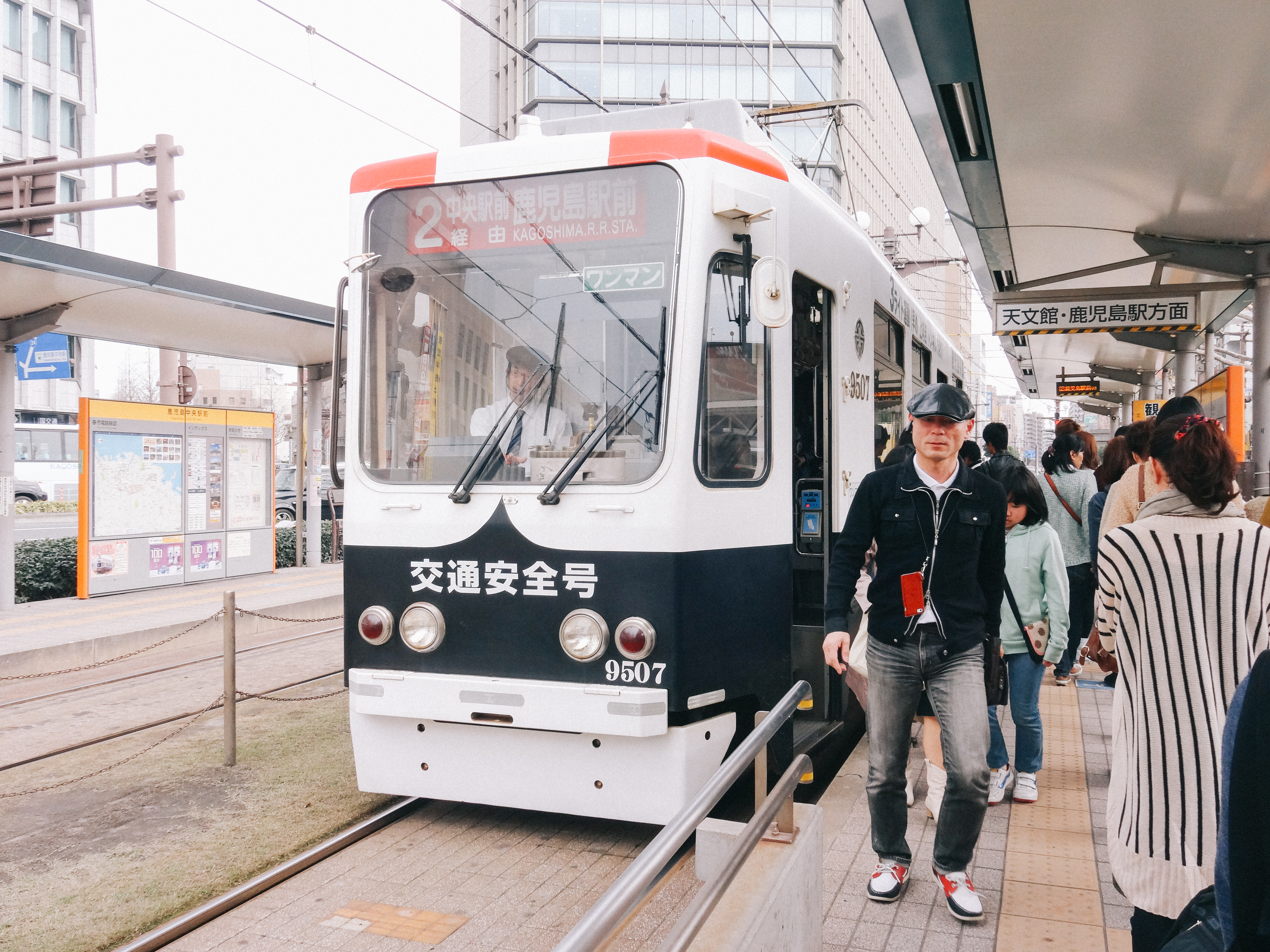
Kagoshima Type 9500 in the Japanese police black and white livery

Current modern rolling stock includes the Little Dancer line of trams, including the Type A3, A5, and X.

==== Historic and Cultural ====
There are a number of historic trams running on the network, as well as unique tourist and community outreach trams.

The sightseeing retro tram, ‘Kagoden’, is a modified modern tram, changed to look like a historic Taisho Era tram. It entered service in December 2012, and was introduced to commemorate the 100th anniversary of the start of streetcar operation in Kagoshima City. However, in December 2021, it was announced that the service would be abolished at the end of 2021 due to slumping passenger numbers. The train has since been operated as a regular service vehicle since January 4, 2022.

The Kagoshima C6 Cafe Tram is a unique tram that is exclusively available for private charters. It is a refurbished vintage car built in 1960 and now features renovated interior, complete with counter tables and chairs.

The 'Kagoshima Machi Meguri Promotion Project' in 2011 involved university students from Kagoshima City who designed a tram, nicknamed 'Denden'. The primary inspiration for the tram's design was the polar bear from the Kagoshima City Hirakawa Animal Park, which was then combined with the design of a black pig, a local speciality. The final design was an even split of both animals.

== Kagoshima City Bus ==
=== History ===
==== Establishment ====
The first automobile transportation lines in Kagoshima City began operating on December 31, 1929 (route length: 15.353 km, 8 vehicles). On April 8, 1930, the city government acquired "Ao Bus'' of Kagoshima Jidosha and began operating all city buses.

==== World War Two ====
During WW2, the national lack of gasoline, firewood and charcoal meant steam powered vehicles appeared. During this time, the first female driver was also introduced. Due to air raids in 1945, only 3 out of 62 trains and 3 out of 45 buses remained.

==== Postwar ====
On October 22nd 1960, the first one-man operation on buses started alongside modern bus rolling stock.

On March 6th 1970, the 'Love' priority seat system was created. The system focused on bettering accessibly for people with physical disabilities, the elderly, and people with small children.

On March 18th 1994, the tourist attraction bus (Kagoshima City View) began operating.

5 Hybrid buses began operations on February 27, 2006. This marked the start of decarbonisation effort of the city fleet.

On October 18, 2011, the Sakurajima Tour Bus (Sakurajima Island View) began operating.

==== Privatisation ====
In 2020, some municipal bus routes (16 routes) were transferred to private operators, marking the end of 90 years of public ownership. Another 4 routes were transferred in April 2021.

=== Lines and Routes ===
Official Bus Routes
Line Number	Route Name	Starting Point (English)	Starting Point (Japanese)	Route	Final Stop (English)	Final Stop (Japanese)
1	Ishiki New Town Line	City Hall	市役所前	Kansei Town - Takami Baba - (Kagoshima Chuo Station) - Shinkamibashi - Nakakusa Muta - Tamae Elementary School - Ishiki Kariya - Ishikidai Junior High School - Ishiki New Town East	Transportation Bureau North Office	交通局北営業所前
3	Yuli Danchi Line	Kagoshima Chuo Station	鹿児島中央駅	(Continuous operation with Line 5) ~ Kajiyamachi ~ Tenmonkan ~ Izuro ~ Aquarium Exit ~ Tatebaba ~ Kamiryuocho ~ Hie Shrine Shimo ~ Tamari Danchi East ~ Tamari Danchi Central	Transportation Bureau North Office	交通局北営業所前
4	Shiroyama/Yamari Line	Kagoshima Chuo Station	鹿児島中央駅	Kajiyamachi - Tenmonkan - City Hall - Prefectural Citizens Exchange Center - Kusamuta Elementary School - Kamiyatani - Tamari Danchi Chuo - (Continuous service with Line 8)	Transportation Bureau North Office	交通局北営業所前
5	Hitohira Line	City Hall	市役所前	(Continuous operation with Line 3) ~ Kinseicho ~ Takami Baba ~ Kagoshima Chuo Station ~ Shinkamibashi ~ Nakakusa Muta ~ Tamae Elementary School ~ Shimoishiki ~ Hitodaira Housing Entrance ~ Wakabacho West	Transportation Bureau North Office	交通局北営業所前
5-3	Hitohira Line (via Tamari Danchi Kita, Satsuma Danchi, Shiroyama Danchi)	City Hall	市役所前	Kanao Town - Takami Baba - Shinkamibashi - Nakakusamuta - Kusamuta Elementary School - Technical High School - Tamae Elementary School - Shimoishiki - Entrance of Hitodaira Housing - Entrance of Satsuma Danchi - Tamasato Danchi North - Wakaba Town West	North Office	北営業所前
8	Nishitamali Danchi Line	City Hall	市役所前	City Hall - Tenmonkan - Kagoshima Chuo Station - Nakakusa Muta to Girls' High School - Tamari Danchi Chuo (continuous service with Line 4)	Transportation Bureau North Office	交通局北営業所前
8-2	Nishi Tamari Danchi Line (departing from Kagoshima Chuo Station)	Kagoshima Chuo Station	鹿児島中央駅	Shinkamibashi - Nakakusa Muta - Ishiki Junior High School - Girls' High School - Tamari Danchi Chuo	Transportation Bureau North Office	交通局北営業所前
10	Komaibashi Line	Kamoike Port	鴨池港	Prefectural office - cavalry range - the Shikadai Main Gate - Koma Bridge - Chuo High School - Shinkami Bridge - Nakakusamuta - Tamae Bridge	Elderly Welfare Center Ishiki	高齢者福祉センター伊敷
11	Kamoike/Reisui Line	Kamoike Port	鴨池港	the baseball stadium - Sanwa Central - Prefectural Office West - the municipal pool - Horse shooting range - the Kadai main gate - Kagoshima Chuo Station - Tenmonkan - Tatebaba - Under Nagata Shrine - Shiroyama Danchi Central - the girls' high school	Elderly Welfare Center Ishiki	高齢者福祉センター伊敷
11-2	Kamoike/Reisui Line (Sakaemachi)	Kamoike Port	鴨池港	the baseball stadium - Sanwa Central - Prefectural Office West - the municipal pool - Horse shooting range - the Kadai main gate - Kagoshima Chuo Station - Tenmonkan - the City Hall - Sakaemachi	Sakaemachi	栄町
12	Coastline	Sakaemachi	栄町	Kagoshima Station - City Hall - Kanseicho - Daimon Exit - Kiyotaki Street - Faculty of Fisheries - Masago Nursery School - Prefectural office - Kamoike Shinmachi - Sanwa Chuo	Sanwa town	三和町
14	Taniyama Line	Taniyama Tram Stop	谷山電停	Taniyama Station (inside Premises) - Taniyama Branch Street - Omido - Jigenji Park - Kagoshima Kindergarten - Jigenji Danchi West	Jigenji Housing Complex	慈眼寺団地
16	Kamoike Port/Culture Hall Line	Aquarium	水族館前	City Hall - Tenmonkan - Kagoshima Chuo Station - Nichudori - Yojiro 1-chome - Civic Culture Hall - Prefectural office - Kamoike Shinmachi - Ryokuchi Koen	Kamoike Port	鴨池港
17	Ujuku Line	Wakita Tram Stop	脇田電停前	Ujuku Elementary School - Sako Kajiwara - Nabegauto - Yasu Danchi - Koyodai Danchi - Yasu Danchi (Shimohiroki)	Koyodai Danchi/Hiroki Agricultural Cooperative	向陽台団地・広木農協前
18	University Hospital Line	Wakita Tram Stop	脇田電停前	Ujuku Elementary School - Kamegahara - Sakuragaoka South - the shopping center - Sakuragaoka North Exit - Sakuragaoka Central Park - Sakuragaoka Higashi Elementary School - Kamegahara - Ujuku Elementary School	Wakita Tram Stop	脇田電停前
20	Midorigaoka/Kamoike Port Line	Kamoike Port	鴨池港	Prefectural office - cavalry range - the Shikadai Main Gate - Kagoshima Chuo Station - Shinkamibashi - Nakakusa Muta - Tamae Elementary School - Shimo-Ishiki - Ishiki Wakita - Ishiki Danchi Chuo - Midorigaoka Danchi Chuo	Midorigaoka Danchi	緑ヶ丘団地
24	Ishiki Line	Aquarium	水族館前	City Hall - Tenmonkan - (Kagoshima Chuo Station) - Sengoku Baba - Nakakusa Muta - Ishiki Junior High School - Shimo-Ishiki - Ishiki Wakita - Ishiki Danchi Chuo - Midorigaoka Danchi Chuo	Midorigaoka Danchi	緑ヶ丘団地
24-2	Ishiki Line (via Nishi-Ishiki 4-chome)	City Hall	市役所前	Kansei Town - Takami Baba - Shinkamibashi - Nakakusa Muta - Tamae Elementary School - Shimo-Ishiki - Ishiki Wakita - Nishi-Ishiki Elementary School Entrance - Nishi-Ishiki 4-chome - Nishi-Ishiki 7-chome East	Ishiki Housing Complex	伊敷団地
27	Prefectural Office/Yojiro Line	Kagoshima Chuo Station	鹿児島中央駅	Kyoken Koen - Kamiarata Town - Shimoarata 4-chome - Yojirogahama - Prefectural office - Kyushu Electric Power Co. Kenkoen	Kagoshima Chuo Station	鹿児島中央駅
28	Ishiki/Kamoike Port Line	Kamoike Port	鴨池港	Prefectural office - cavalry range - Shinyashiki - Sengoku Baba - Kusamuta - Ishiki Junior High School - Shimo-Ishiki - Ishiki Wakita - Nishi-Ishiki 3-chome - Nishi-Ishiki 6-chome	Ishiki Housing Complex	伊敷団地
29	Ishiki New Town/Kamoike Port Line	Kamoike Port	鴨池港	Prefectural office - cavalry range - Shinyashiki - Kajiyamachi - Shinshoin - Gokoku Shrine - Shimo-Ishiki - Ishiki New Town West Entrance - Ishiki New Town - Ishiki New Town East Entrance	Transportation Bureau North Office	交通局北営業所前
31	Tamari/Sanwacho Line	Sanwa town	三和町	Sanwa Central - Prefectural office - the Nisseki - Tempozan - Nanrinji Temple - Izuro - Aquarium Exit - Tatebaba - Kamiryuo Town - Hie Shrine Lower - Tamari Danchi East - Tamari Danchi North Exit	Transportation Bureau North Office	交通局北営業所前
32	Shiroyama/Sanwacho Line	Sanwa town	三和町	Sanwa Central - Honmachi Park -Japan Red Cross Red Cross - Tempozan - Nanrinji Temple - Izuro - Prefectural Community Center - Kusamuta Elementary School - Kamiyadani - Tamari Welfare Center	Elderly Welfare Center Ishiki	高齢者福祉センター伊敷
51	Satsuma Danchi Line	Kagoshima Chuo Station	鹿児島中央駅	Kajiyamachi ~ Izuro ~ Prefectural Community Center ~ Reisui Pass ~ Tamari Community Center ~ Tamari Danchi East ~ Tamari Danchi Welfare Center Bottom ~ Hitodaira Housing ~ Satsuma Danchi ~ Ishiki New Town Tamaridai	Ishiki New Town Chuo	伊敷ニュータウン中央
60	Sakurajima Line (Sakurajima Hospital)	Sakurajima Hospital	桜島病院	Sakurajima Port - Hosaki - Akabuhara - Okubo - Hamadaira - the Sakurajima Chamber of Commerce and Industry - Matsuura - Hot Spring Center - Higashi Shirahama	Higashi Shirahama	東白浜
60	Sakurajima Line (Welfare Center)	Welfare Center	福祉センター	Sakurajima Port - Hosaki - Akabuhara - Okubo - Hamadaira - the Sakurajima Chamber of Commerce and Industry - Matsuura - Hot Spring Center - Higashi Shirahama	Higashi Shirahama	東白浜
60	Sakurajima Line (Sakurajimaen)	Sakurajimaen	桜島苑	Sakurajima Port - Hosaki - Akabuhara - Okubo - Hamadaira - Sakurajima Chamber of Commerce and Industry - Matsuura - Hot Spring Center - Higashi Shirahama (~ Okudaira - Takamen Elementary School - Kurokami Elementary School)	Higashi Shirahama (Shioyagamoto)	東白浜(塩屋ヶ元)
70	Sakurajima Alternative Line	Higashi Shirahama	東白浜	Okudaira - Takamen Elementary School - Nishizonoyama - Nishiuranomae - Kurokami Elementary School - Shioyagamoto	Kurokamiguchi	黒神口
-	Kagoshima City View	Kagoshima Chuo Station	鹿児島中央駅	Meiji Restoration Furusatokan - Astronomical Museum - Shiroyama - Saigo Nanshu Memorial Museum - Sengonen - Kagoshima Station (Kanmachia) - Sakurajima Pier - Water Front Park - Astronomical Museum	Kagoshima Chuo Station	鹿児島中央駅
-	Kagoshima City View (Night view course)	Kagoshima Chuo Station	鹿児島中央駅	Astronomical Museum - Waterfront Park - Minato Odori Park - Shiroyama - Saigo Statue - Astronomical Museum	Kagoshima Chuo Station	鹿児島中央駅

=== Rolling Stock ===
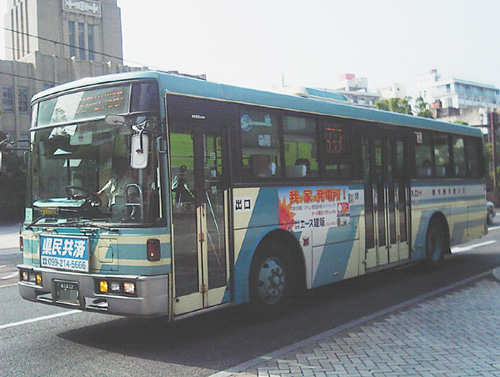
Two-step bus used on general routes with current livery.

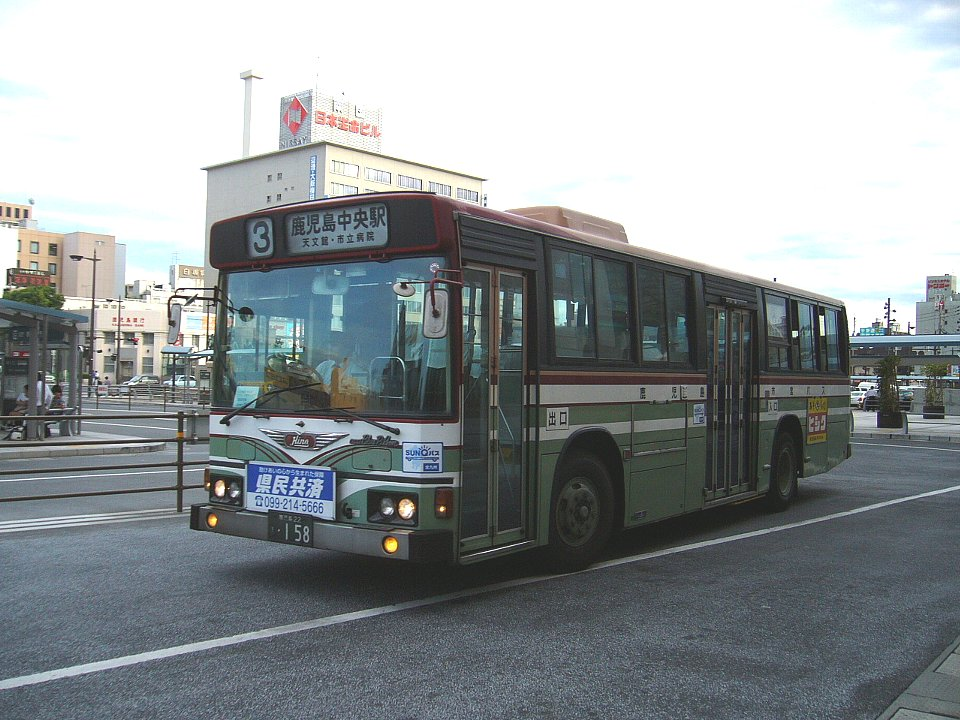
Two-step bus used on general routes, with the 1989 livery.

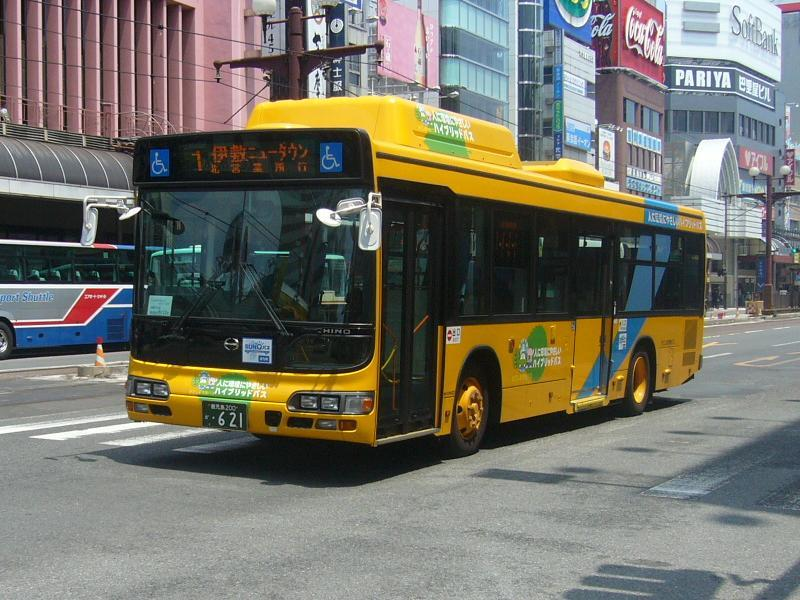
Level-boarding hybrid bus.

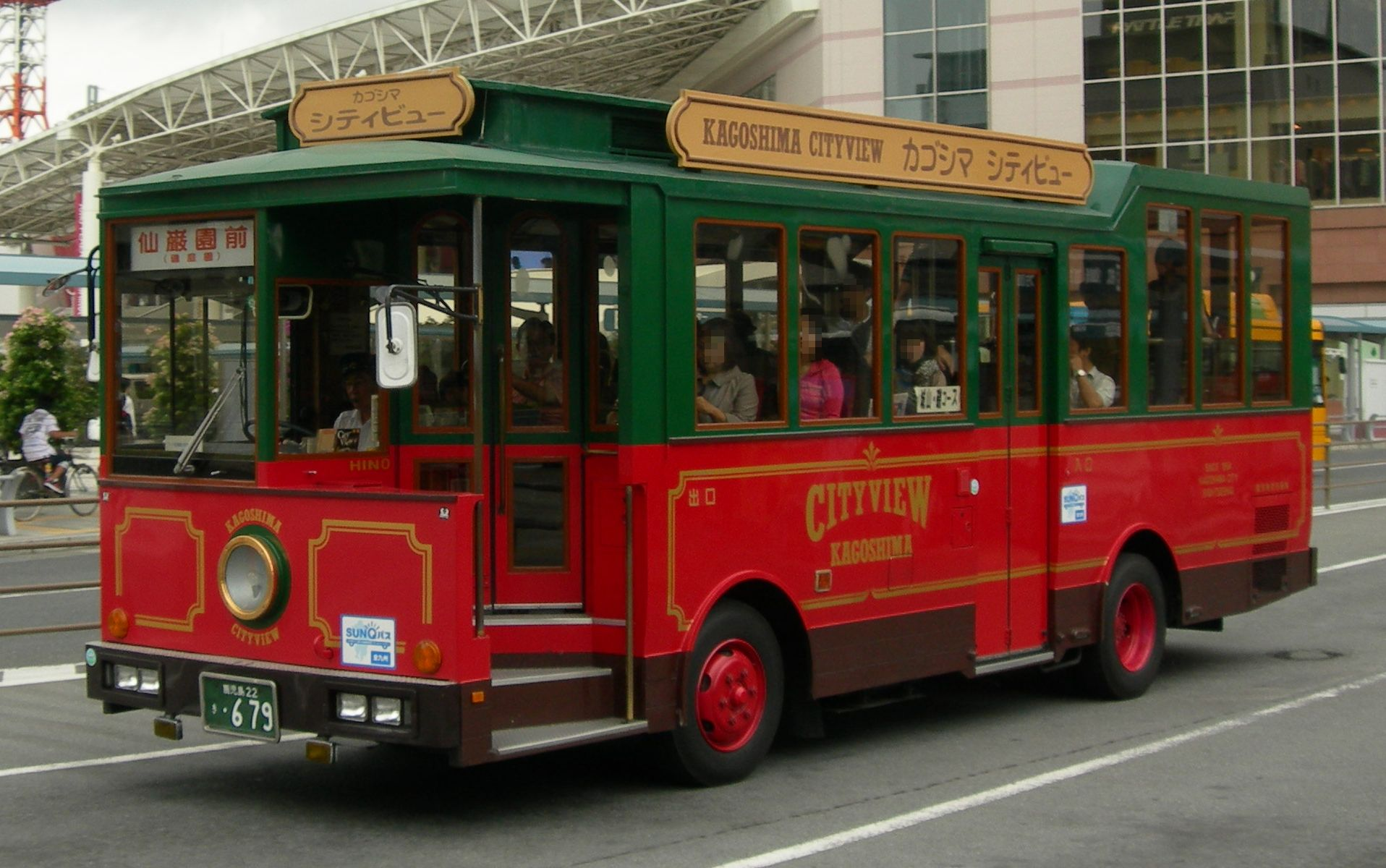
"Kagoshima City View" (Shiroyama/Iso Line), introduced in 1994.

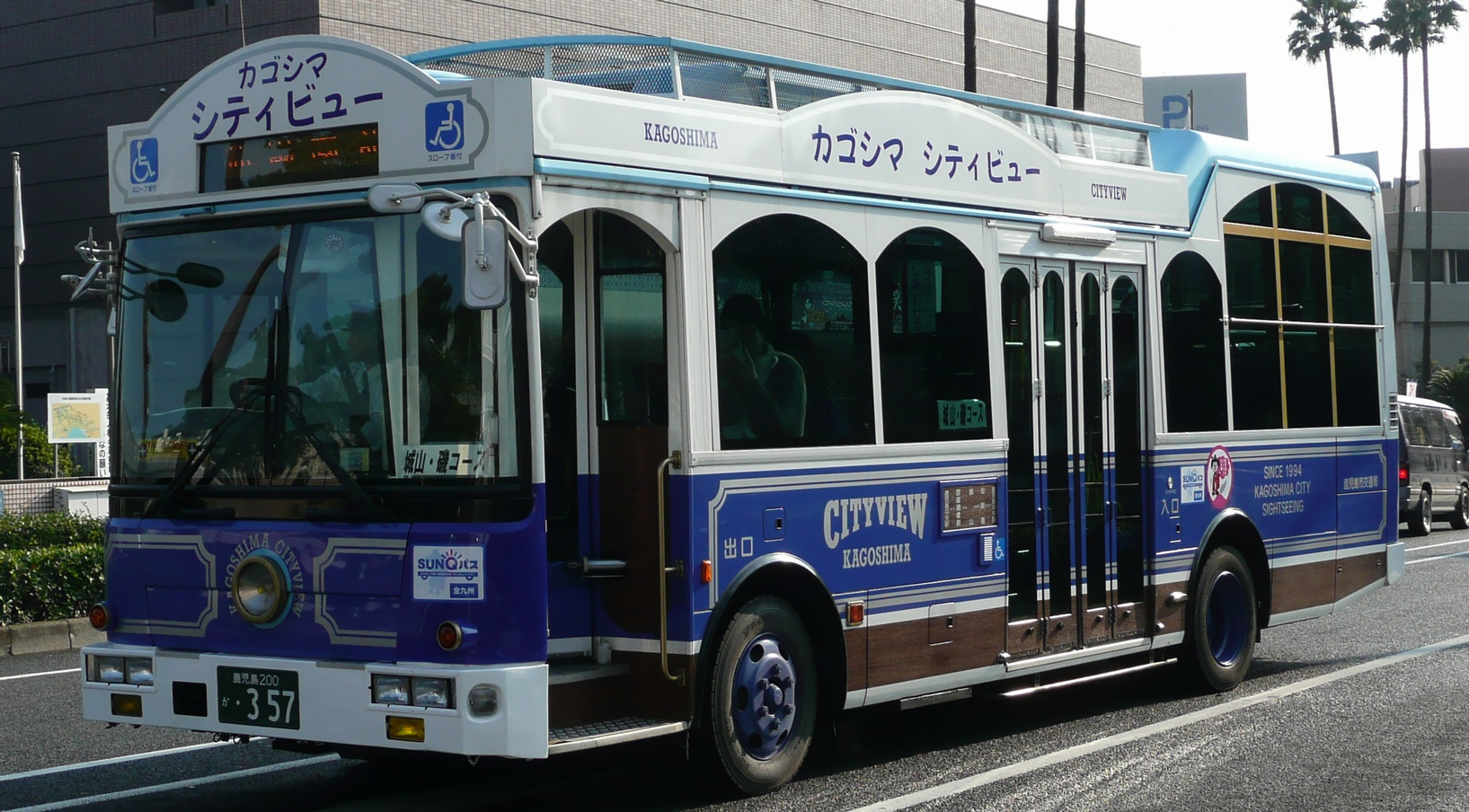
"Kagoshima City View" (Shiroyama/Iso Line), secondary livery.

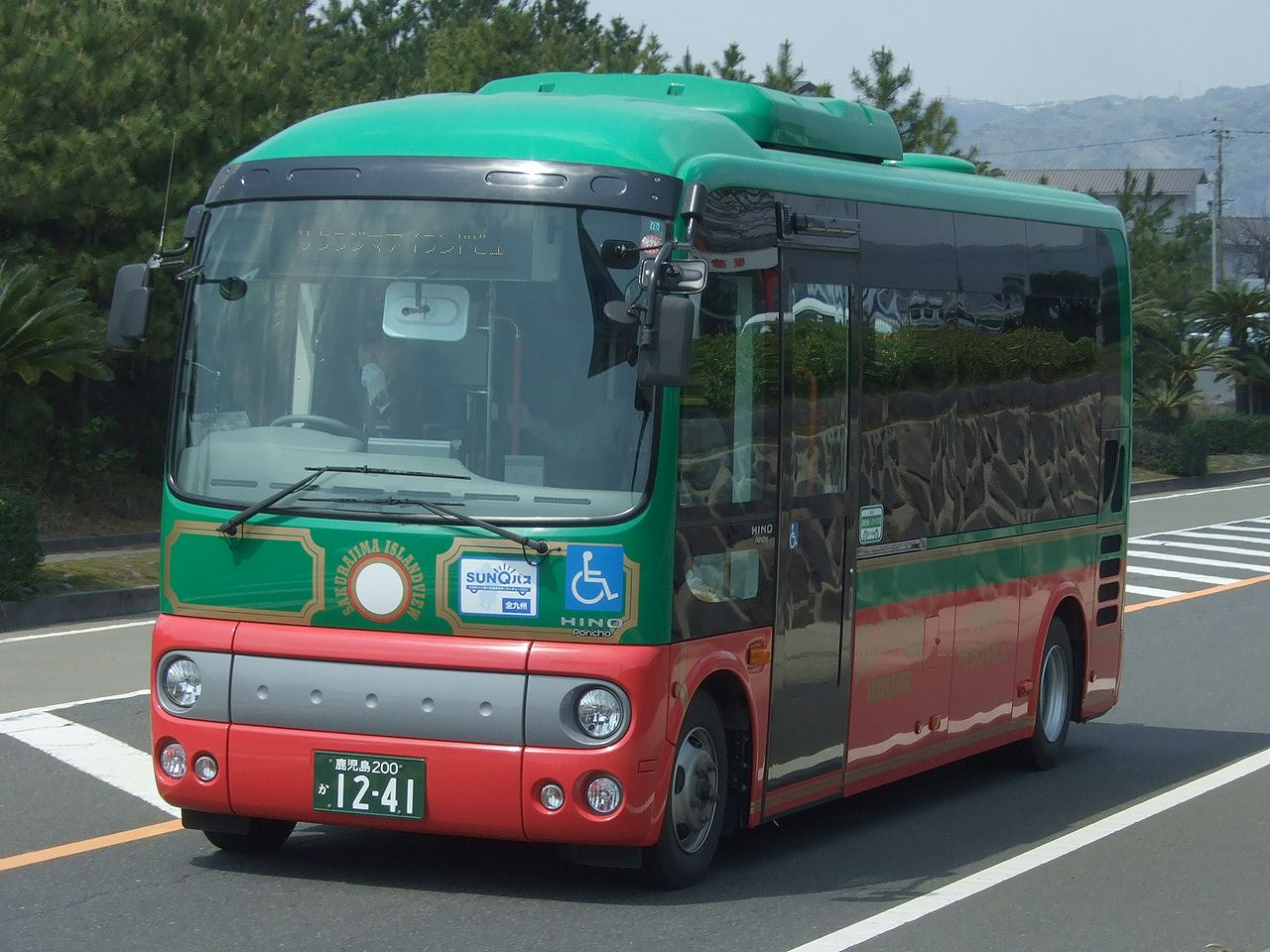
Vehicle for “Sakurajima Island View”

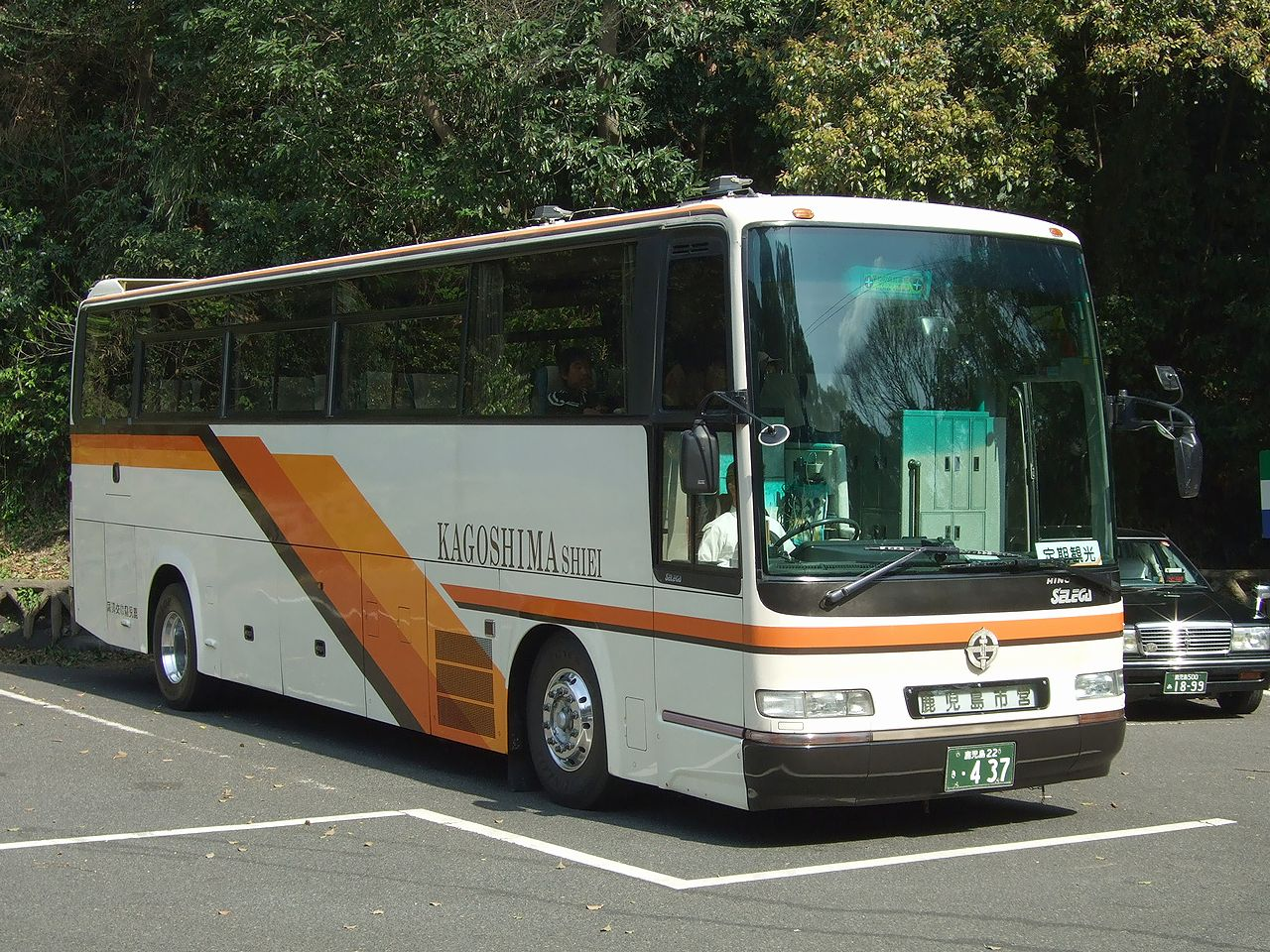
A regular sightseeing bus (Kagoshima History Exploration Course) using a chartered vehicle ordered by the station.

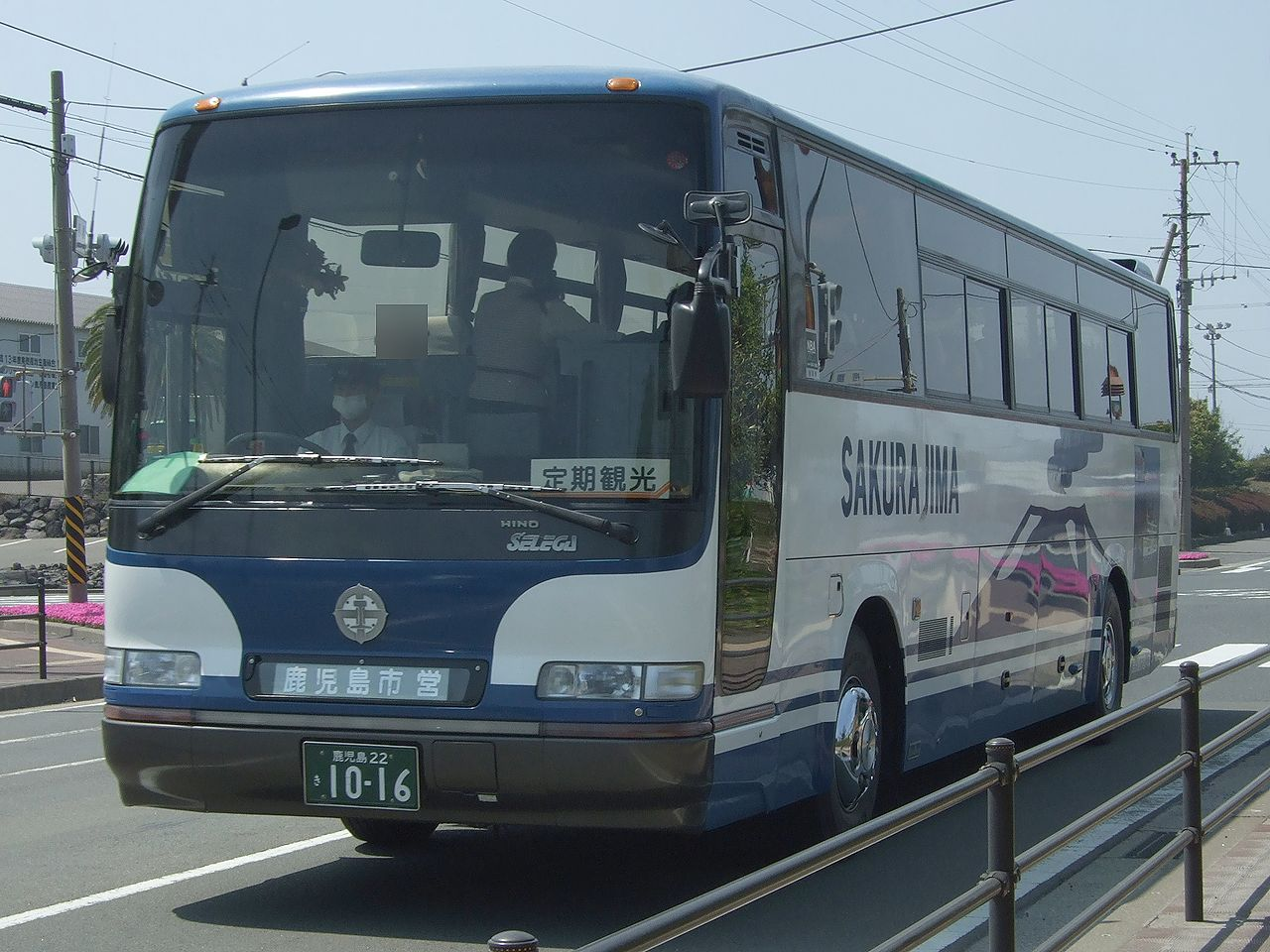
A regular sightseeing bus (Sakurajima nature sightseeing course) that uses chartered cars taken over from Sakurajima Town.

== See also ==
- List of light-rail transit systems
- Little Dancer, one of the LRVs operated on its lines
