= Little Dancer =

Japanese low-floor tram vehicle

The Little Dancer is a low-floor tram brand built by Alna Sharyo, a Japanese manufacturer of trams and light rail vehicles.

== Overview ==
The name "Little Dancer" was chosen by Alna Sharyo for two reasons, firstly to evoke an image of a lively dancer, and secondly for its similarity to the Japanese word "dansa". "Dansa" in Japanese means "step", pertaining to the step-free access that the trams provide. The result is aimed to evoke an image of a lively, cute, and small tram.

Little Dancer trams feature conventional bogies so that it is easier for railway companies and their maintenance staff to adjust to the trams when they are introduced.

== Type ==
There are several variants of the Little Dancer.

=== Type S ===
Type S series are a short body type tram with a single section.

- Iyo Railway - 2100 series. (10 sets)
- Iyo Railway - 5000 series. (12 sets)
- Sapporo Streetcar - 1100 series (2 set)
- Railway Technical Research Institute - LH02 (Test car.) (1 set)
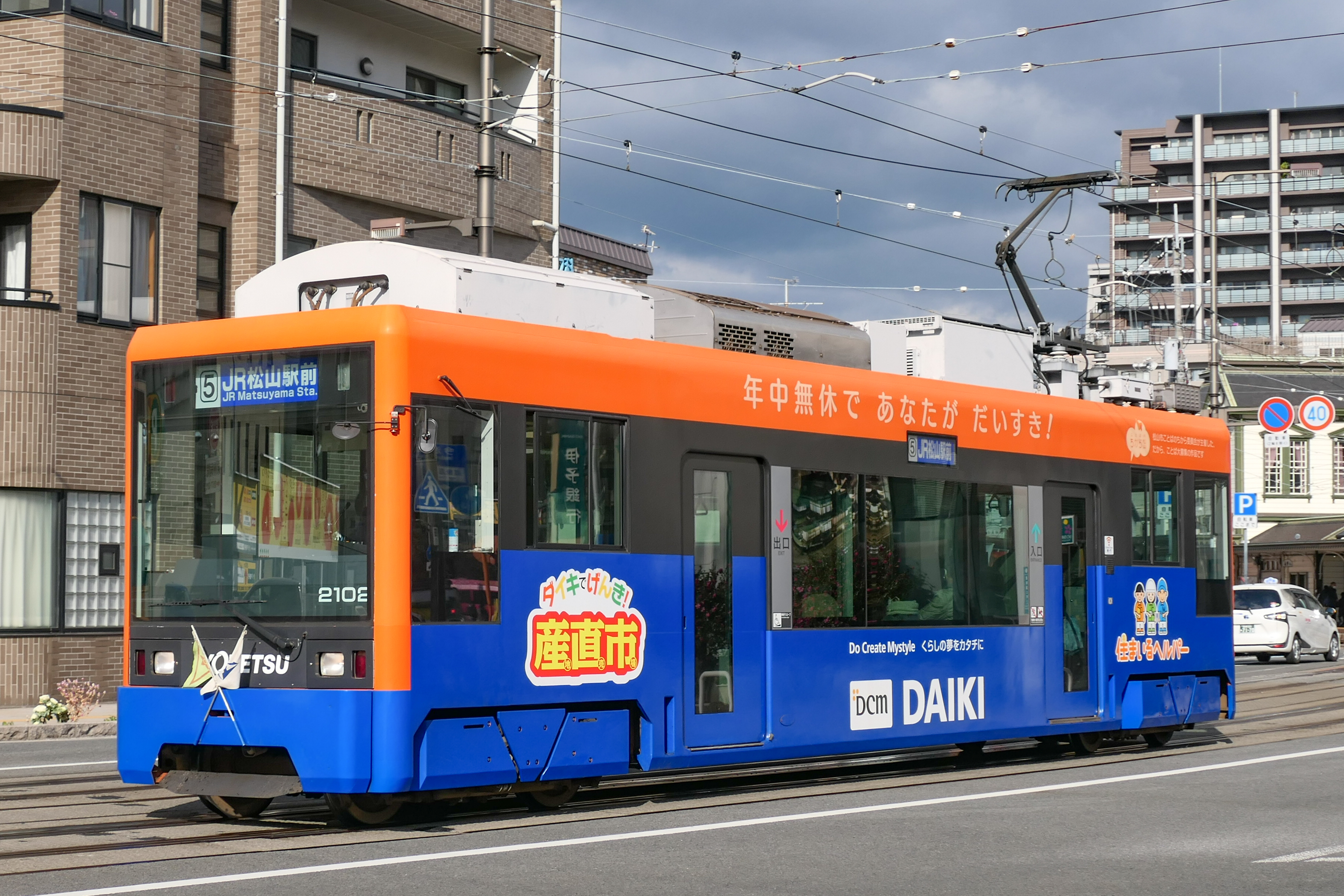
Iyo Railway 2100 series

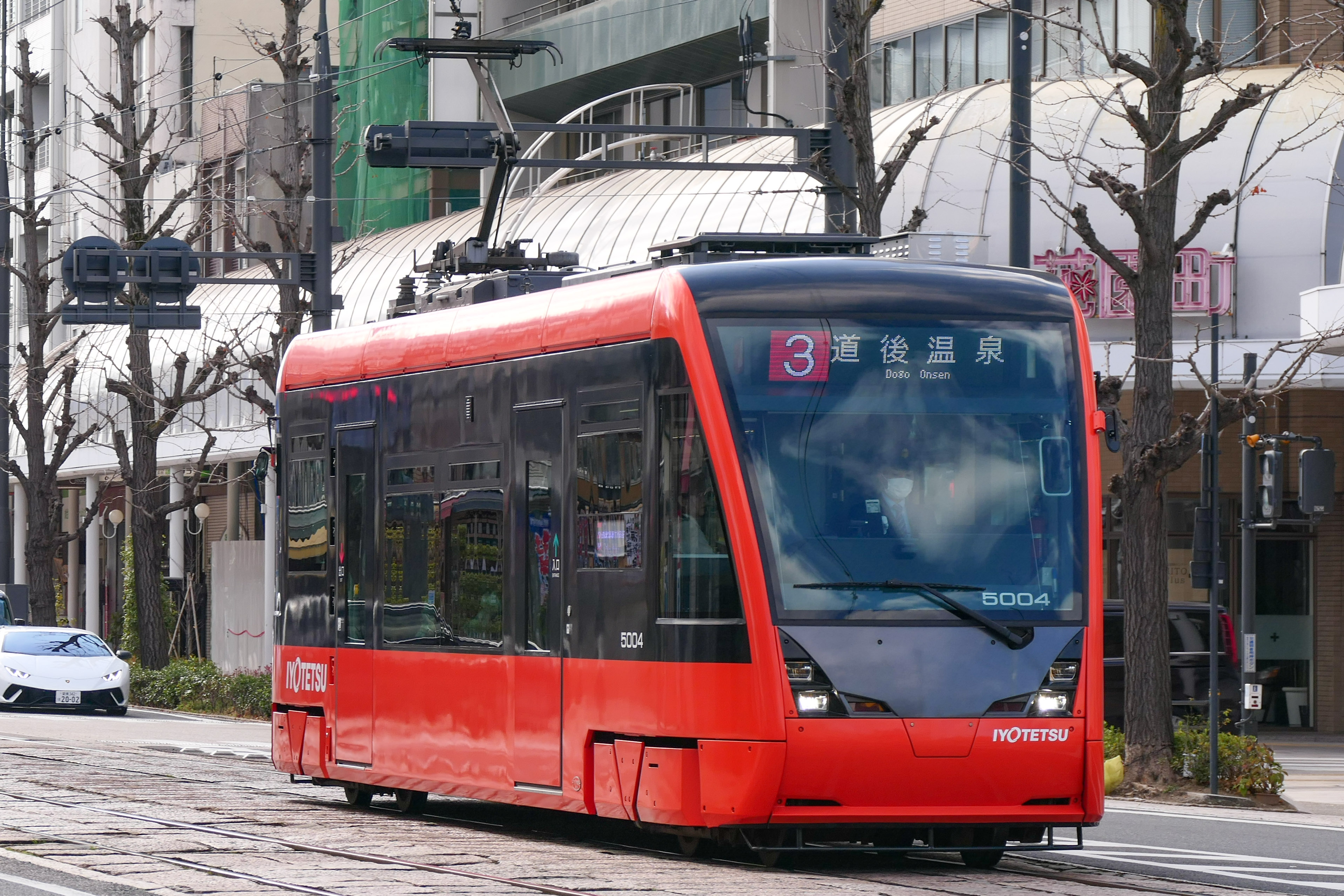
Iyo Railway 5000 series

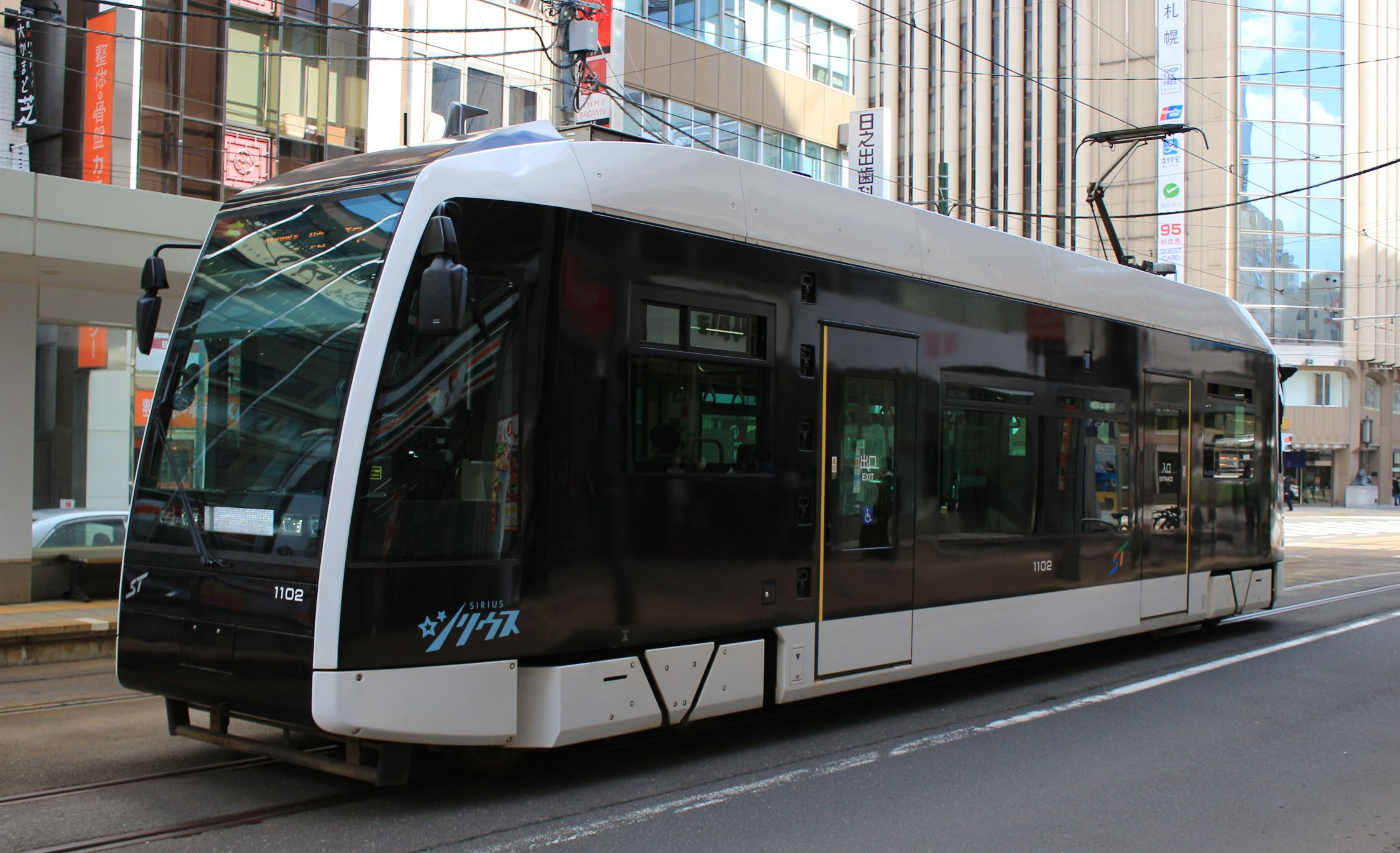
Sapporo 1100 series

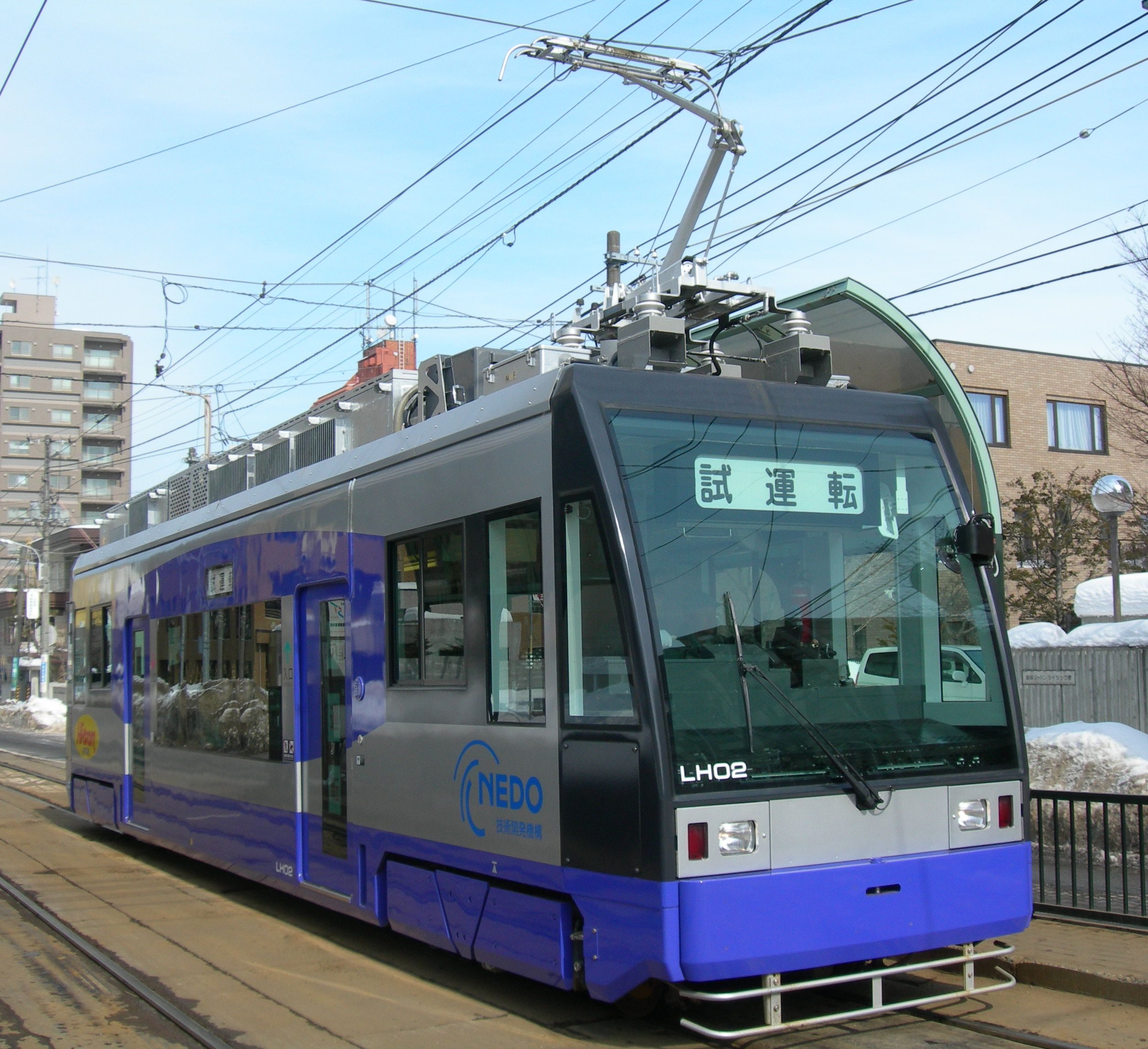
LH02

=== Type L ===
Type L series have an articulated three section body.

- Tosaden Kōtsū - 100 series. (1 set)
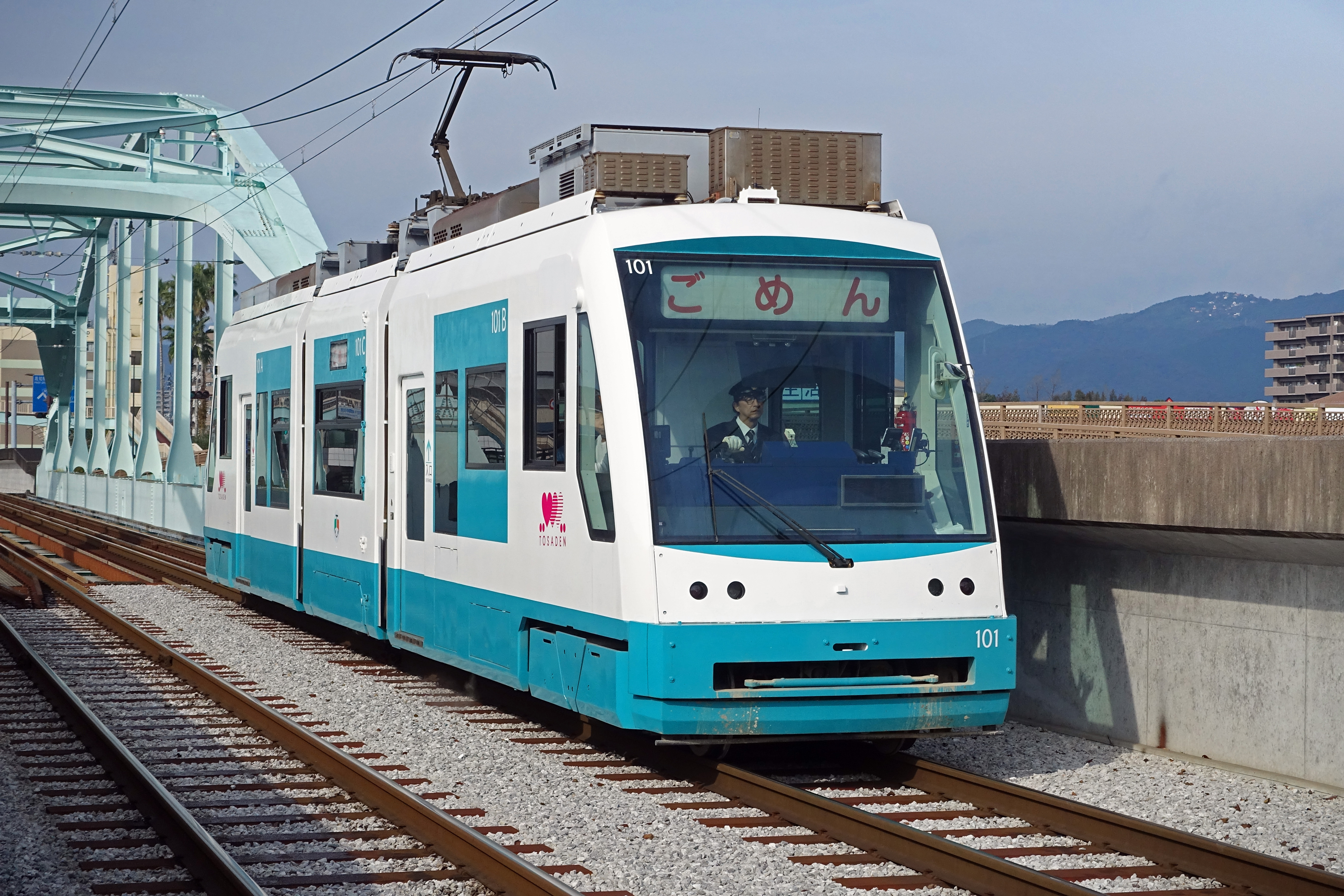
Tosaden 100 series

=== Type A ===
Type A series adopt 3 or 5 articulated bodies. (Some of the articulations have no bogies and are floating.)

- Kagoshima City Transportation Bureau - 1000 series (9 sets) and the first Little Dancer type to enter service.
- Kagoshima City Transportation Bureau - 7000 series (4 sets)
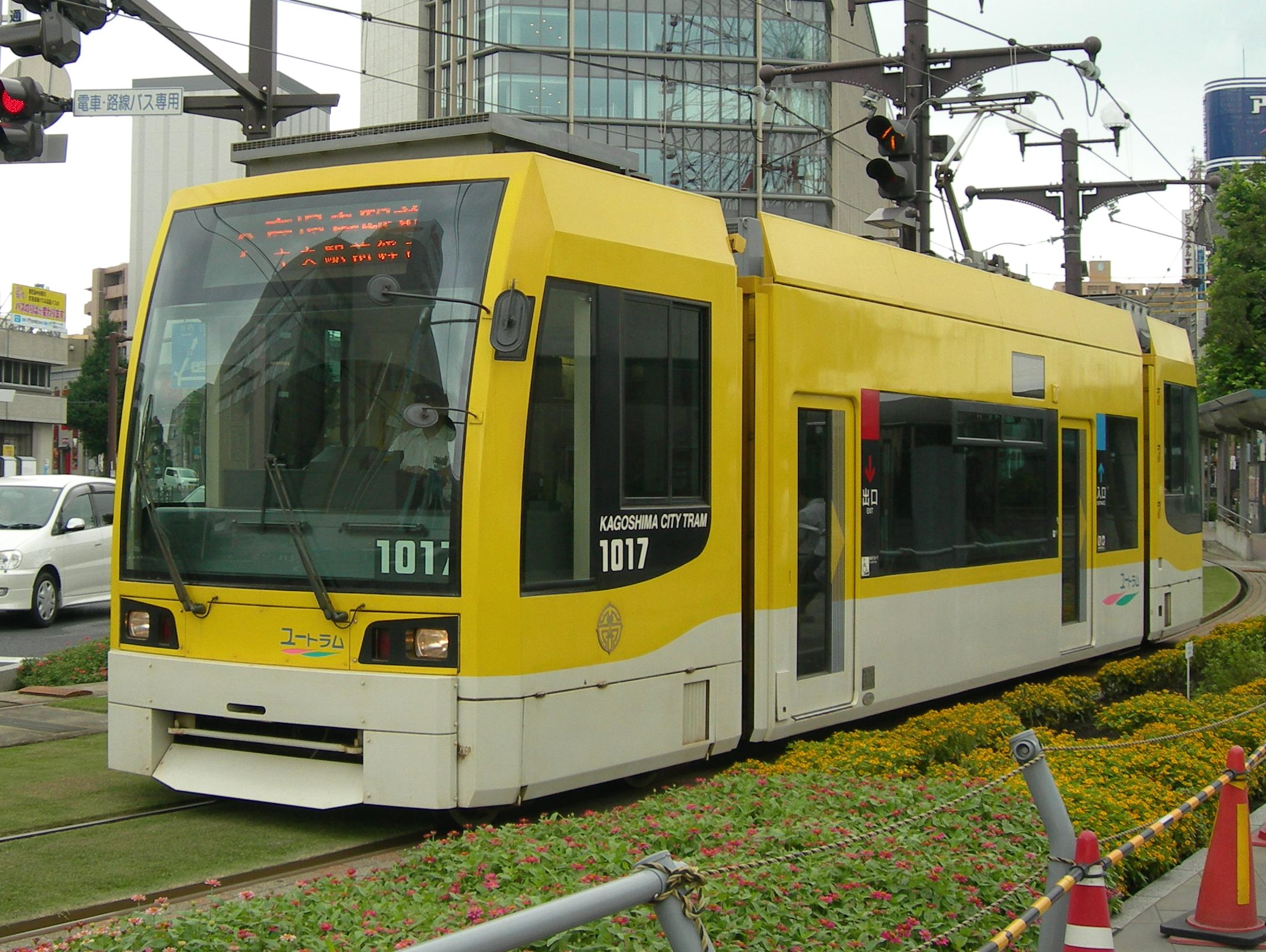
Kagoshima 1000 series (Type A3)

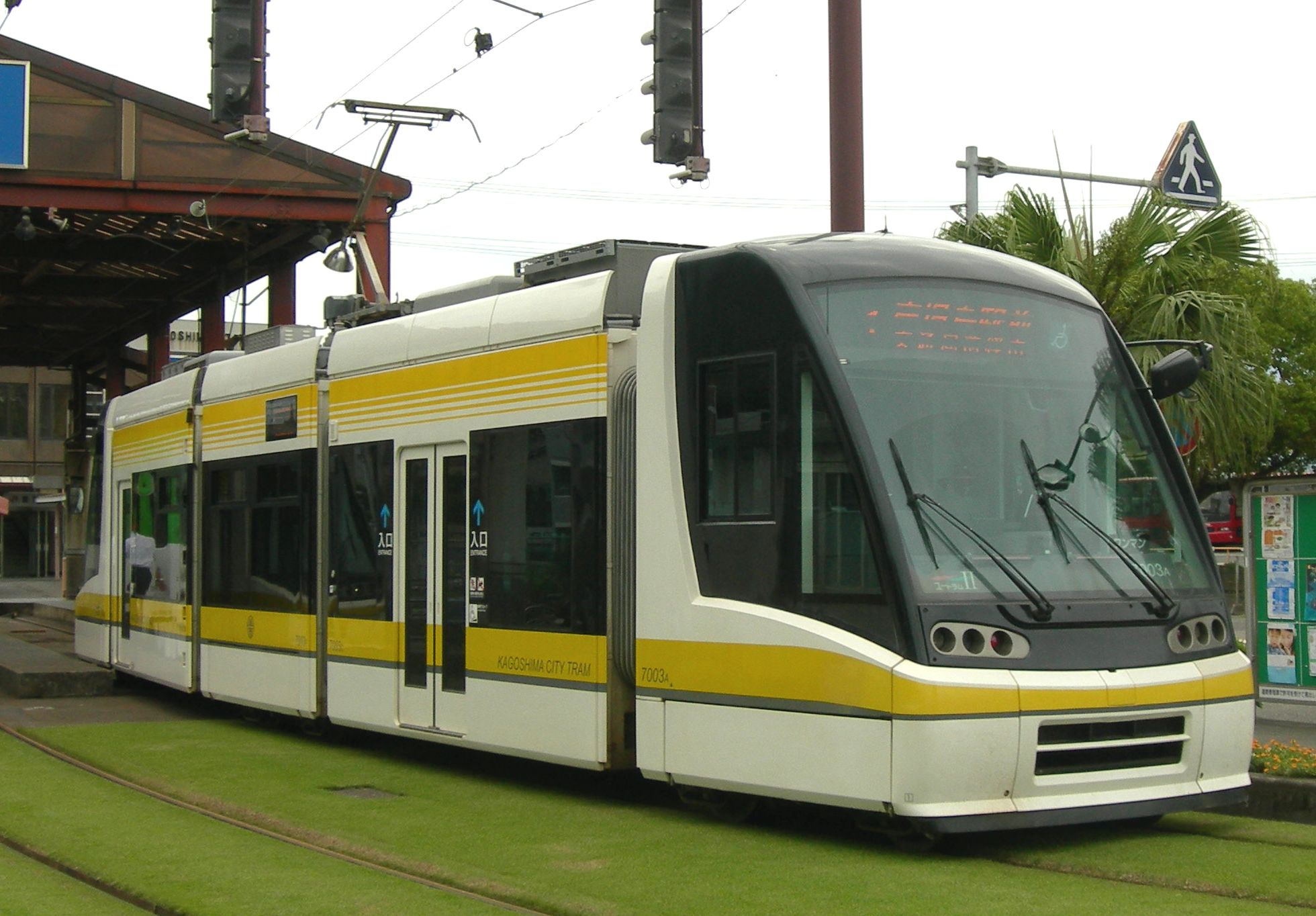
Kagoshima 7000 series (Type A5)

=== Type U, Ua ===
Type S,L,A series weren't 100% low floor, because the motors attached the bogies. U series devises to position the motor. So, U series are 100% low floor. "U" is an initial of "Ultimate".

- Nagasaki Electric Tramway - 3000 series (3 sets) and 5000 series (3 sets)
- Toyohashi Railroad - T1000 series (1 set)
- Toyama Chihō Railway - T100 series (2 sets)
- Sapporo Streetcar - A1200 series (3 sets)
- Hankai Tramway - 1001 series (3 sets)
- Chikuhō Electric Railroad - 5000 series (4 sets)
- Tosaden Kōtsū - 3000 series (3 sets)
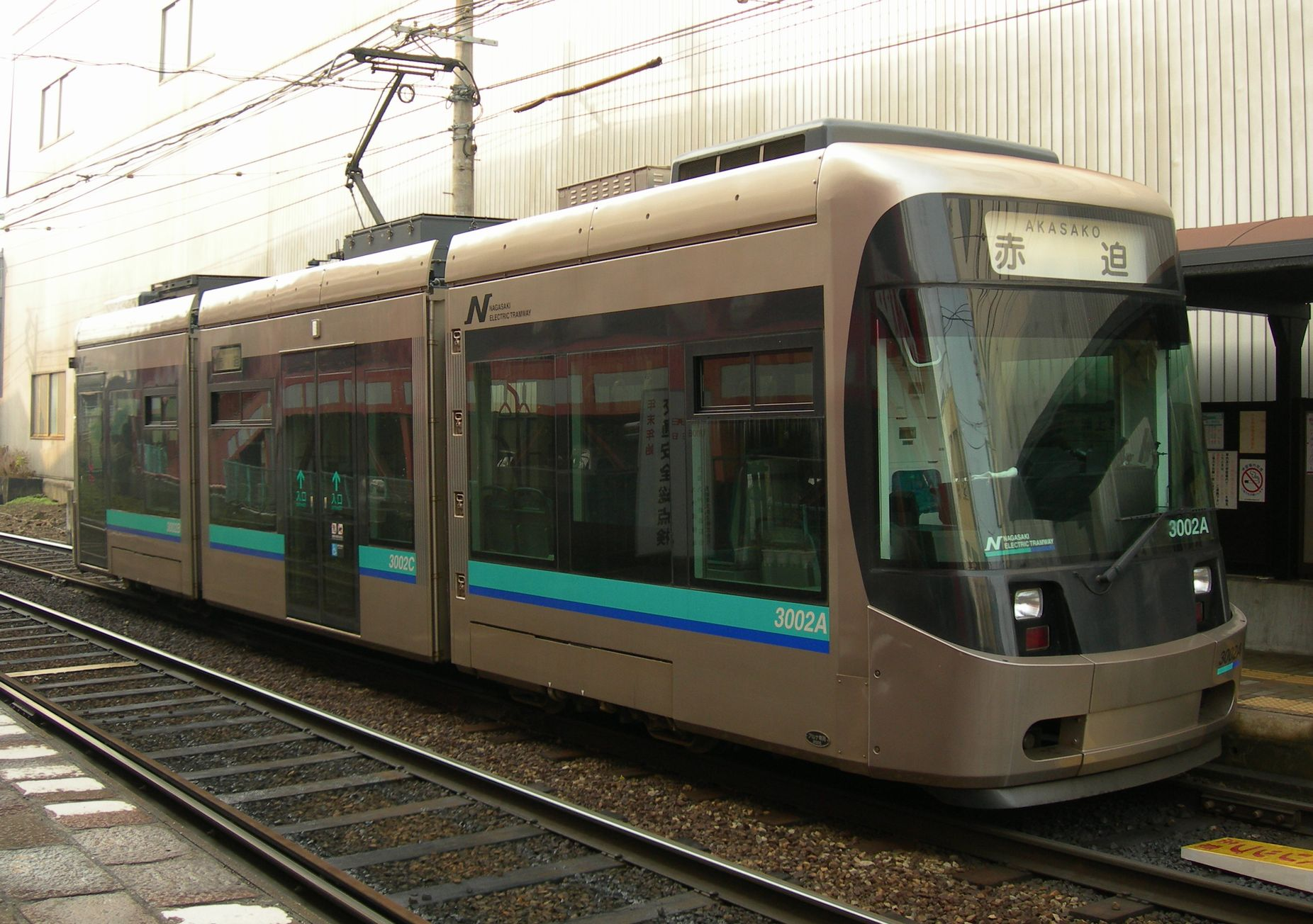
Nagasaki 3000 series (Type U)

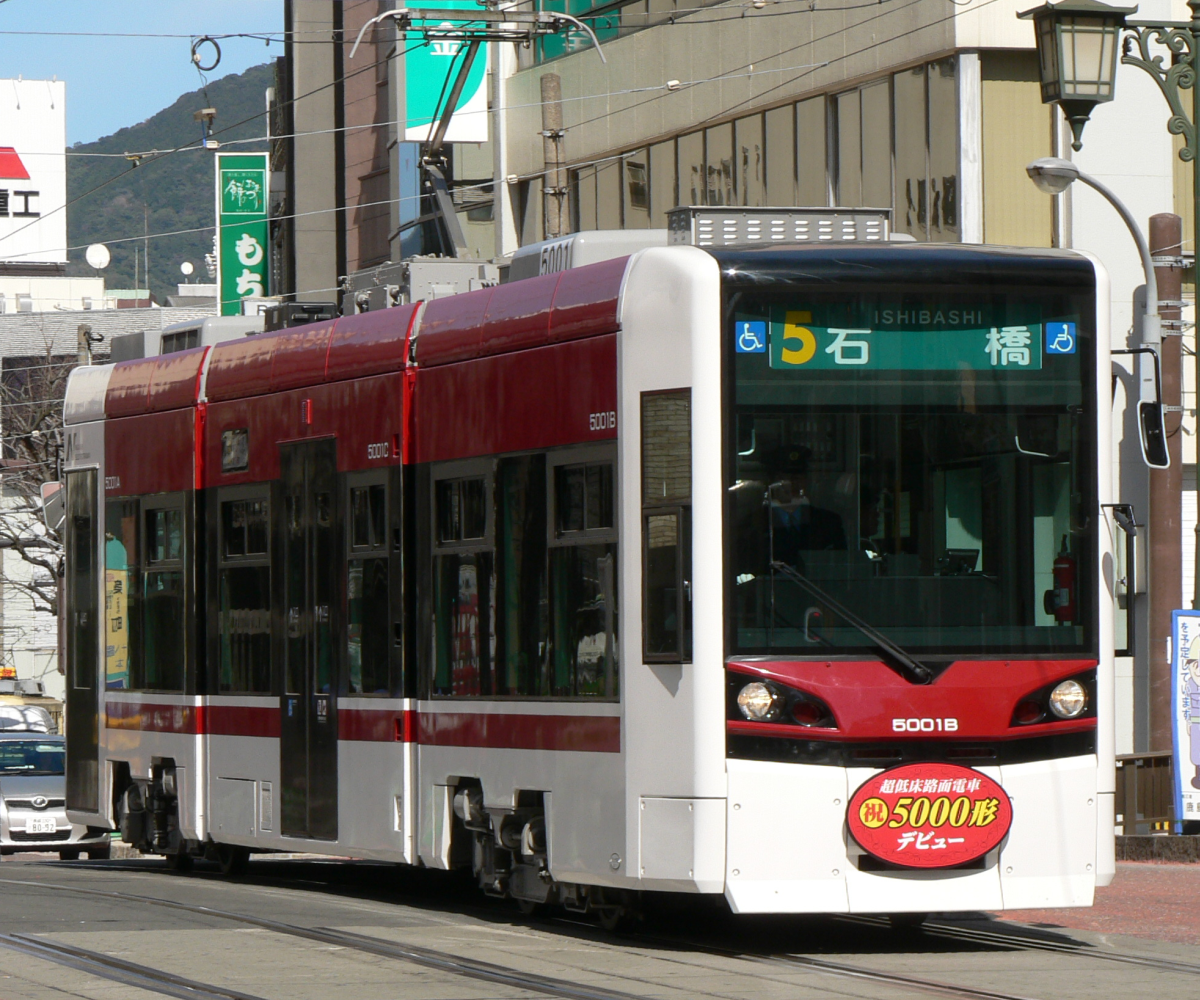
Nagasaki 5000 series (Type Ua)

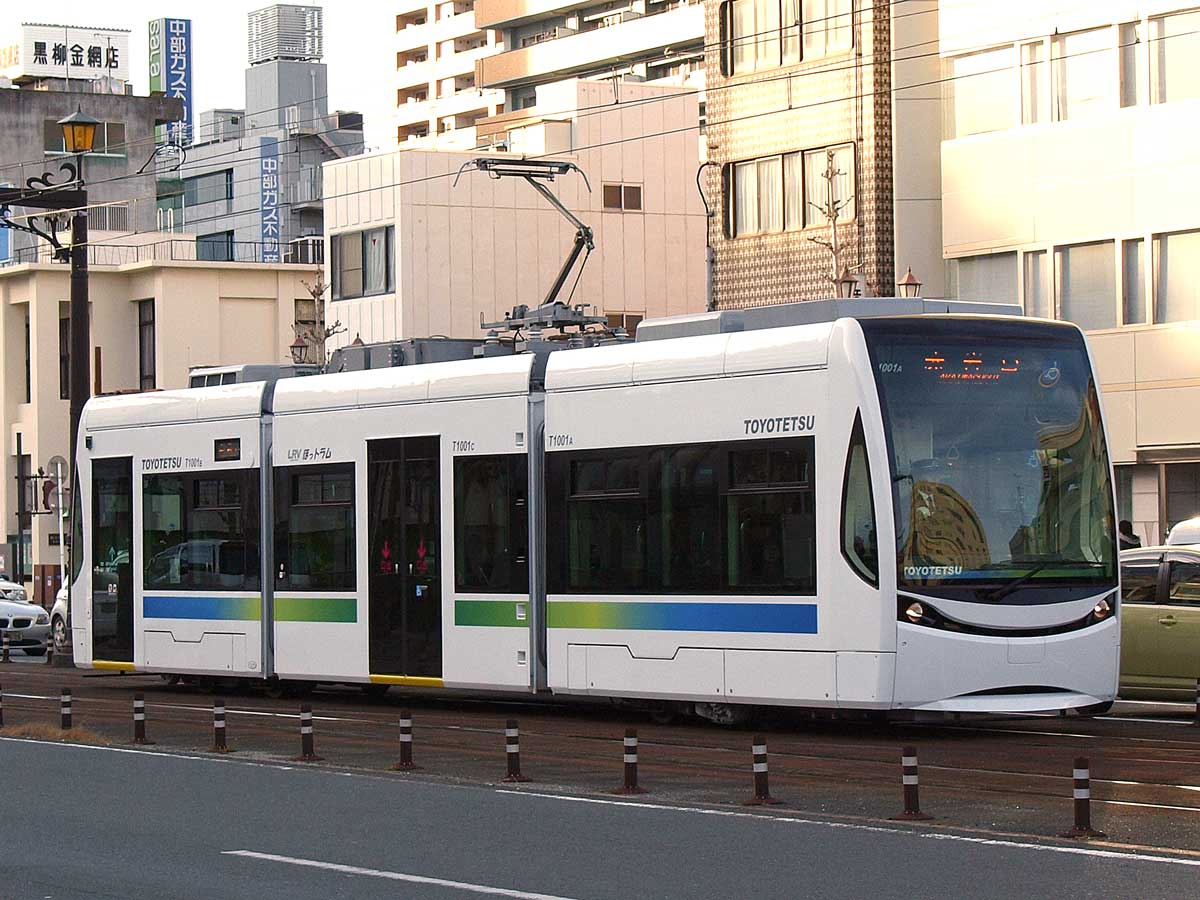
Toyohashi T1000 series (Type Ua)

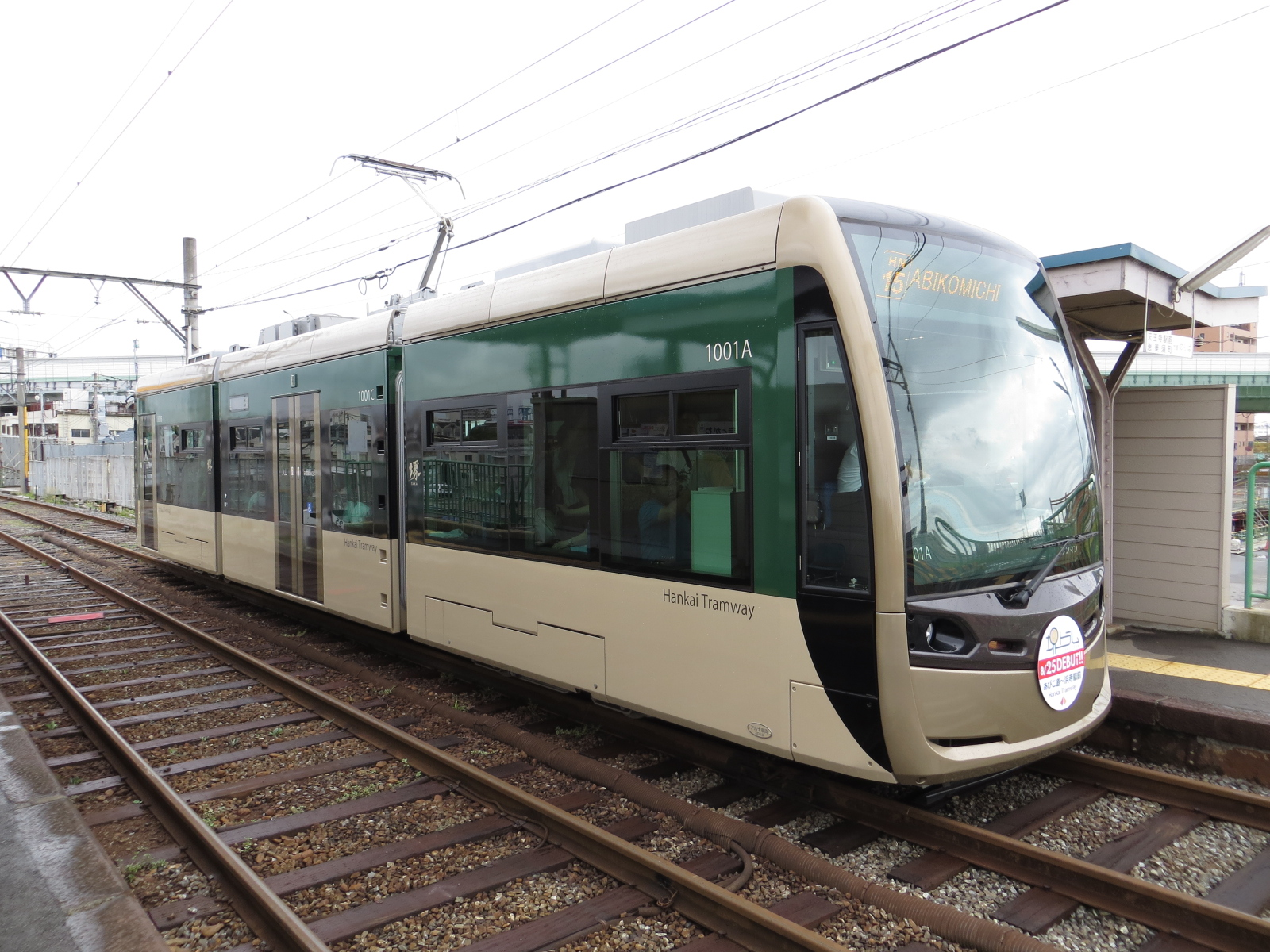
Hankai 1001 series (Type Ua)

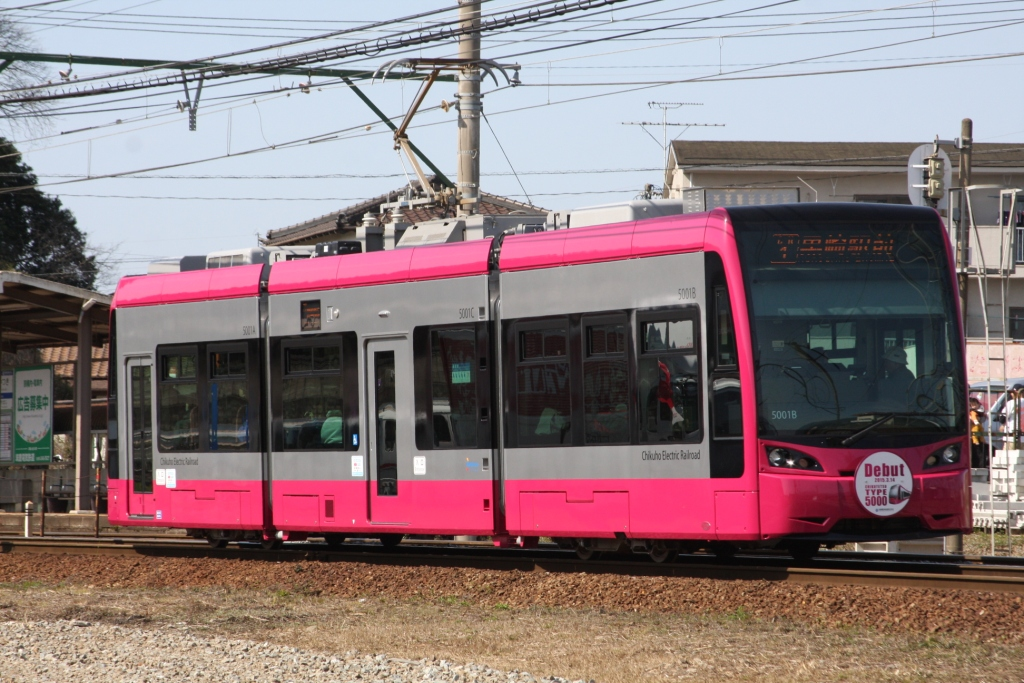
Chikutetsu 5000 series (Type Ua)

=== Type C ===
"C" is an initial of "Combination".

- Hakodate Transportation Bureau - 9600 series (2 sets)
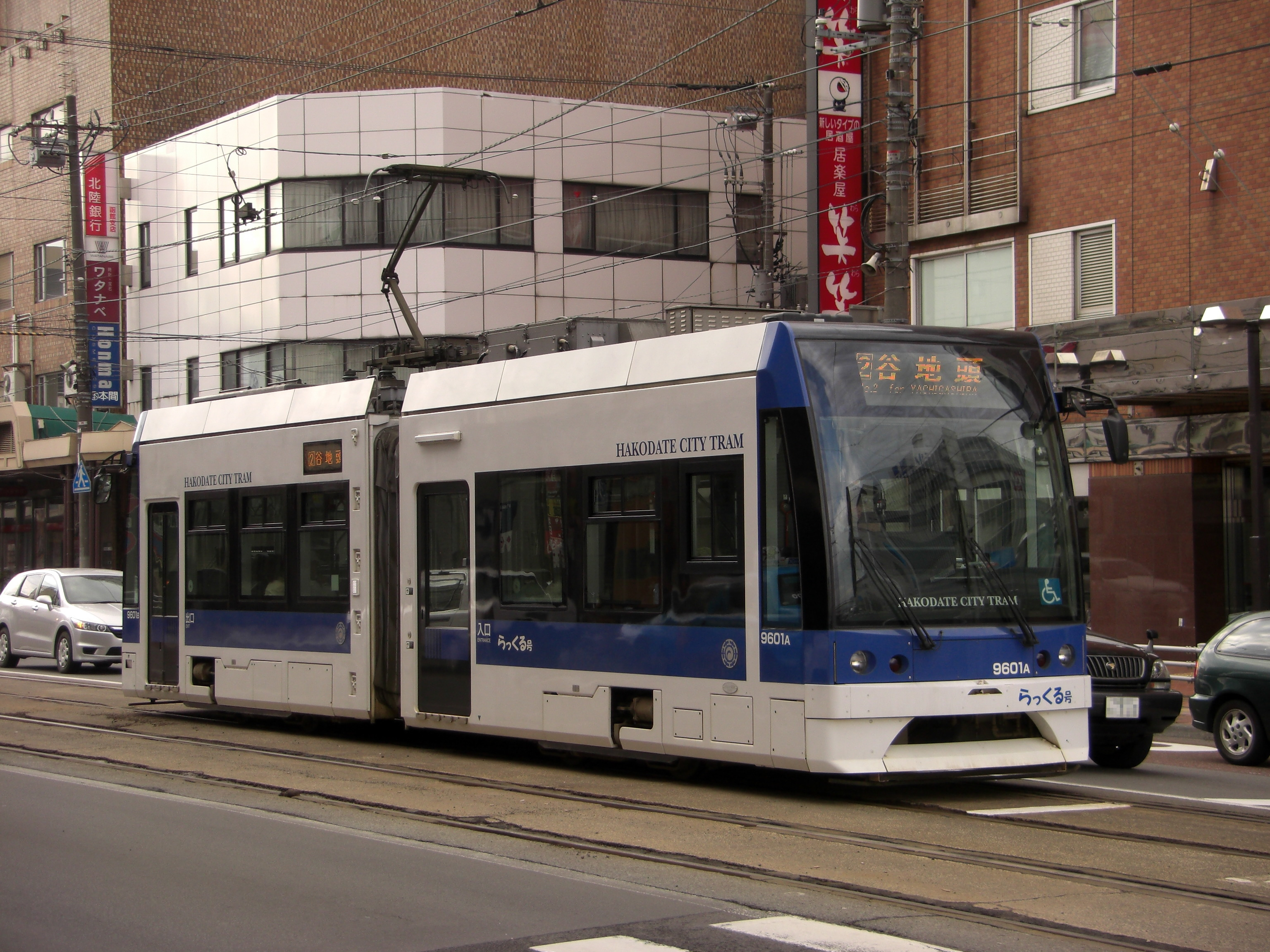
Hakodate 9600 series (Type C2)

=== Type X ===
The traction motor is downsized to the limit, and the same driving system as the conventional vehicle is adopted.

- Kagoshima City Transportation Bureau - 7500 series (unknown)
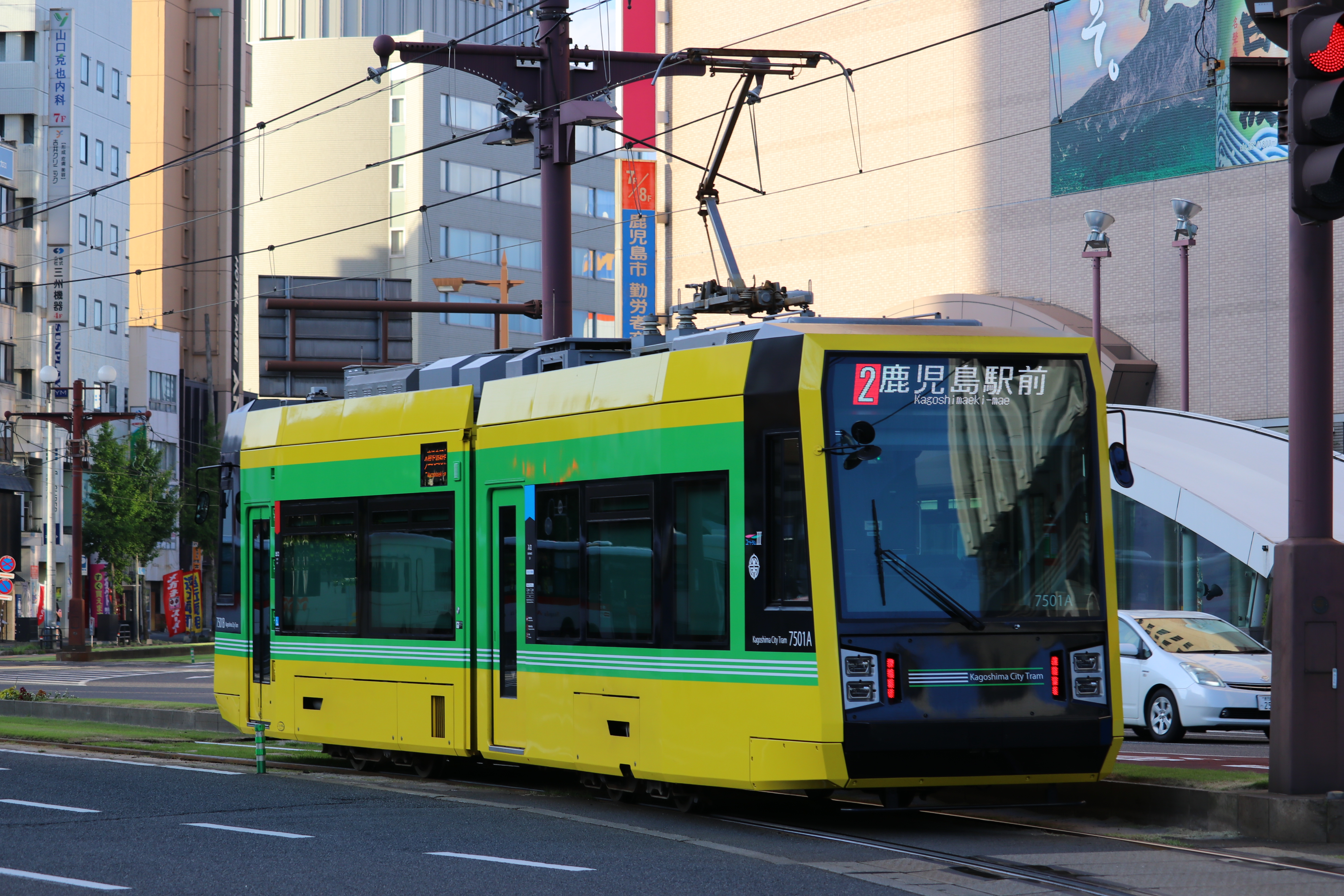
Kagoshima 7500 series (Type X)

=== Type N ===
- Nagasaki Electric Tramway - 6000 series (2 sets)
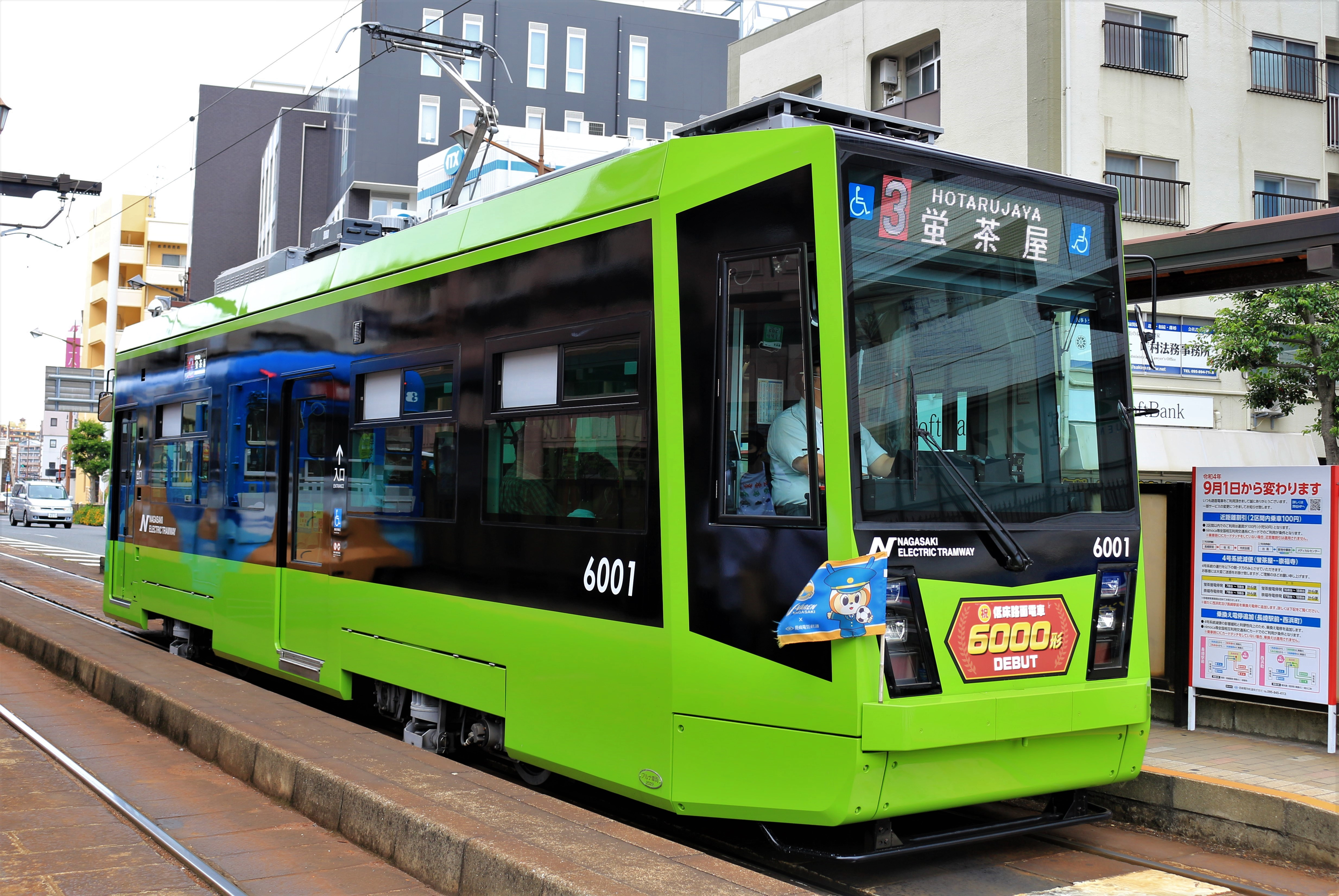
Nagasaki 6000 series (Type N)

== See also ==
In Japan, three brands compete with Little Dancer:

- Bombardier, ADtranz low floor tram - built under license by Niigata Transys.
- Siemens, Combino - Hiroshima Electric Railway, Japan's largest tram operator, purchased 12 Combinos which entered service as the Hiroshima Electric Railway 5000 series, but due to a structural fault the manufacturer issued a product recall and as of 2023 only three were still in use.
- Green Mover Max - Following the recall and other issues with the Siemens Combino trams, a consortium of Japanese companies - Kinki Sharyo, Mitsubishi Heavy Industries (MHI), and Toyo Electric Corporation - designed and constructed a Japanese-manufactured low-floor articulated tram. Hiroshima Electric Railway purchased 10 of these trams between 2004 and 2008 which entered service as the Hiroshima Electric Railway 5100 series.
