= Hiyoshichō Station =

Railway station in Shizuoka, Japan

Hiyoshichō Station 日吉町駅
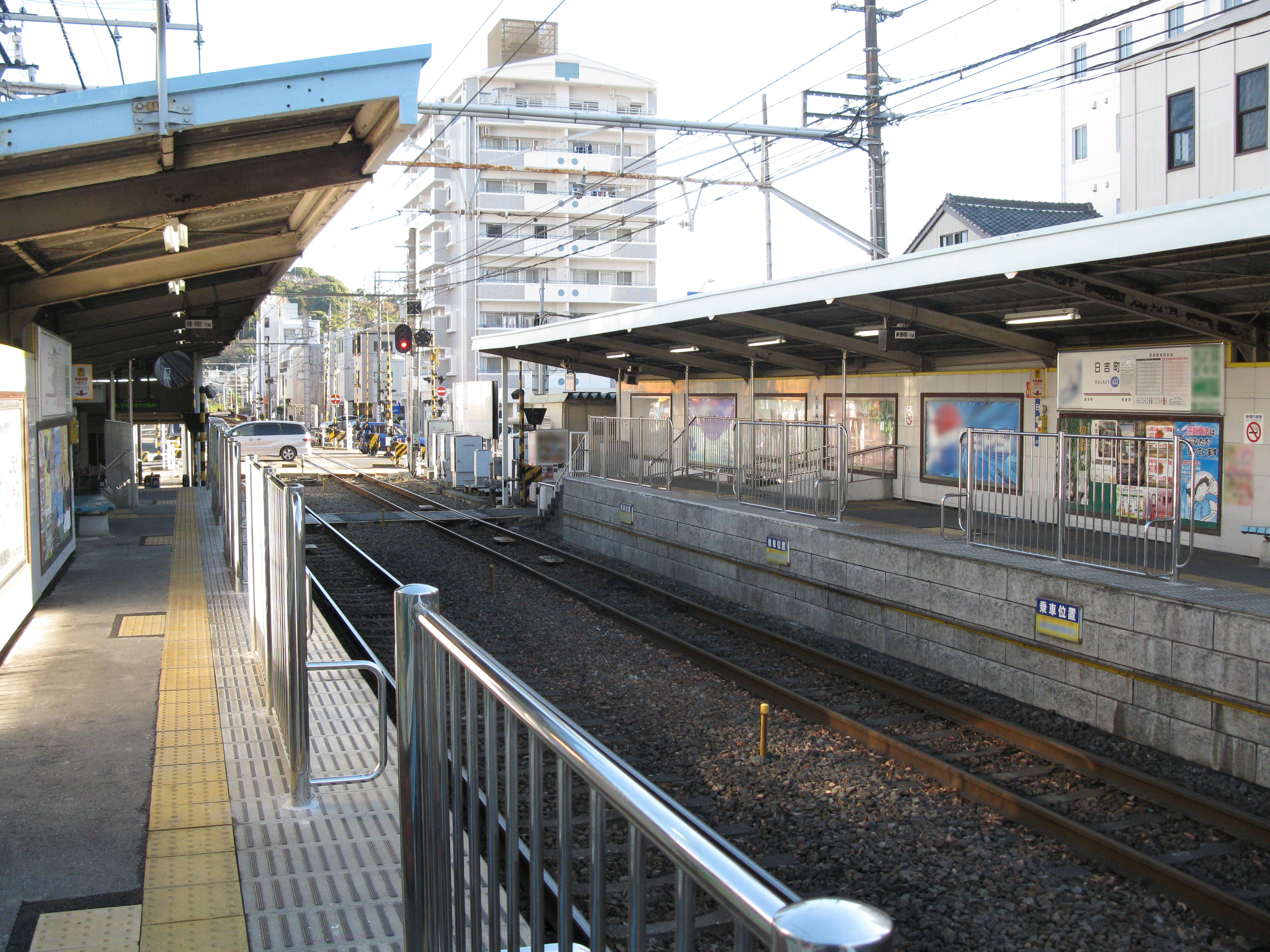
- Hiyoshichō platforms in December 2010

General information
- Location: Takajō 2-chōme, Aoi-ku, Shizuoka-shi, Shizuoka-ken; Japan
- Coordinates: 34.977173°N 138.391523°E
- Operator: Shizuoka Railway
- Line: ■ Shizuoka–Shimizu Line
- Distance: 0.5 km from Shin-Shizuoka
- Platforms: 2 side platforms

Other information
- Status: Unstaffed
- Station code: S02

History
- Opened: December 9, 1908
- Former names: Daidokoromachi (to 1945)

Passengers
- FY2017: 729 (daily)

Services
Preceding station	Shizuoka Railway	Following station
Shin-Shizuoka Terminus	Shizuoka–Shimizu Line Local	Otowachō towards Shin-Shimizu
Location
- Location within Shizuoka Prefecture Location within Japan

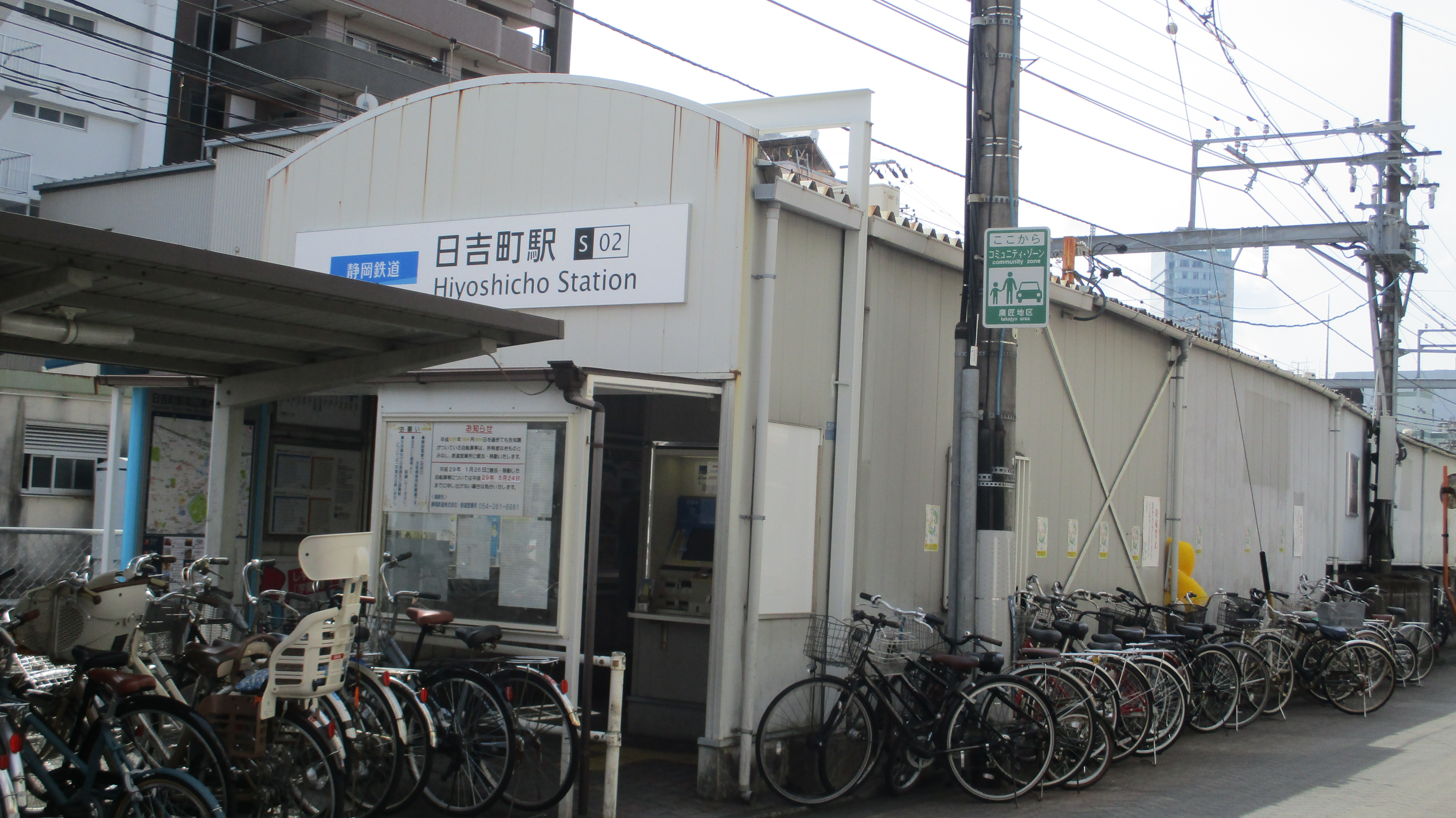
Station building

Hiyoshichō Station (日吉町駅, Hiyoshichō-eki) is a railway station in Aoi-ku, Shizuoka, Shizuoka Prefecture, Japan, operated by the private railway company, Shizuoka Railway (Shizutetsu).

== Lines ==
Hiyoshichō Station is a station on the Shizuoka–Shimizu Line and is 0.5 kilometers from the starting point of the line at Shin-Shizuoka Station.

== Station layout ==
The station has two opposed side platforms with a level crossing at one end. It has automated ticket machines, and automated turnstiles, which accept the LuLuCa smart card ticketing system as well as the PiTaPa and ICOCA IC cards.

=== Platforms ===
1	■ Shizuoka-Shimizu Line	for Shin-Shimizu
2	■ Shizuoka–Shimizu Line	for Shin-Shizuoka

== Station History ==
Hiyoshichō Station was established as Daidokoromachi Station (台所町駅, Daidokoromachi-eki) on December 9, 1908. It was renamed to its present name after World War II.

== Passenger statistics ==
In fiscal year 2017, Hiyoshichō station was used by an average of 729 passengers daily (boarding passengers only).

== Surrounding area ==
- Japan National Route 1

== See also ==
- List of railway stations in Japan
