= Yunoki Station (Shizuoka, Shizuoka) =

Railway station in Shizuoka, Japan

Yunoki Station 柚木駅
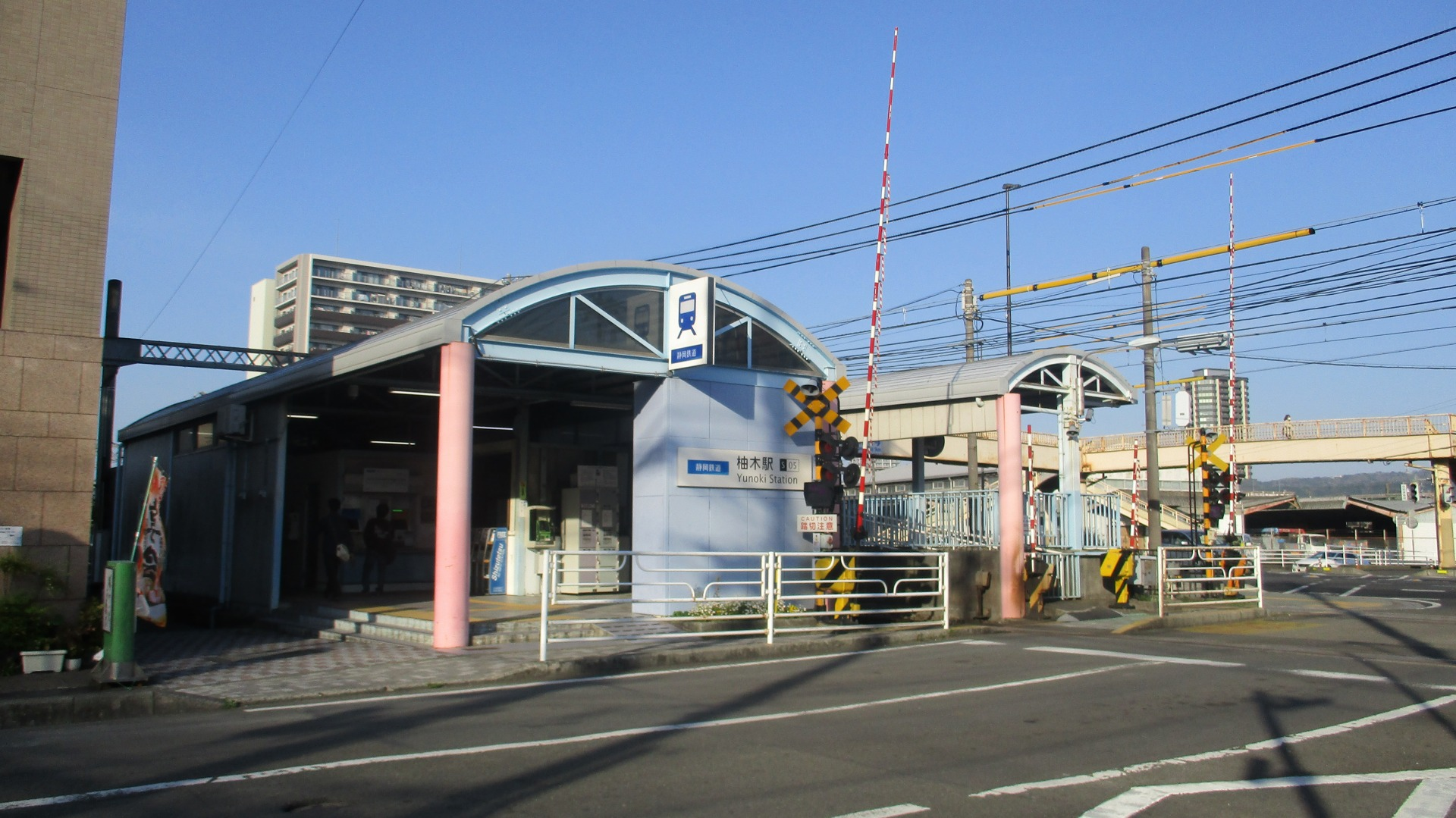
- Yunoki Station, April 2017

General information
- Location: Miyamae-chō, Aoi-ku, Shizuoka-shi, Shizuoka-ken; Japan
- Coordinates: 34°58′54.59″N 138°24′21.86″E
- Operator: Shizuoka Railway
- Line: ■ Shizuoka–Shimizu Line
- Distance: 2.0 km from Shin-Shizuoka
- Platforms: 2 side platforms

Other information
- Status: Unstaffed
- Station code: S05

History
- Opened: December 9, 1908
- Former names: Magarikane (to 1942] Gokoku Jinjamae (to 1945)

Passengers
- FY2017: 1622 (daily)

Services
Preceding station	Shizuoka Railway	Following station
Kasugachō towards Shin-Shizuoka	Shizuoka–Shimizu Line Local	Naganuma towards Shin-Shimizu
Location
- Location within Shizuoka Prefecture Location within Japan

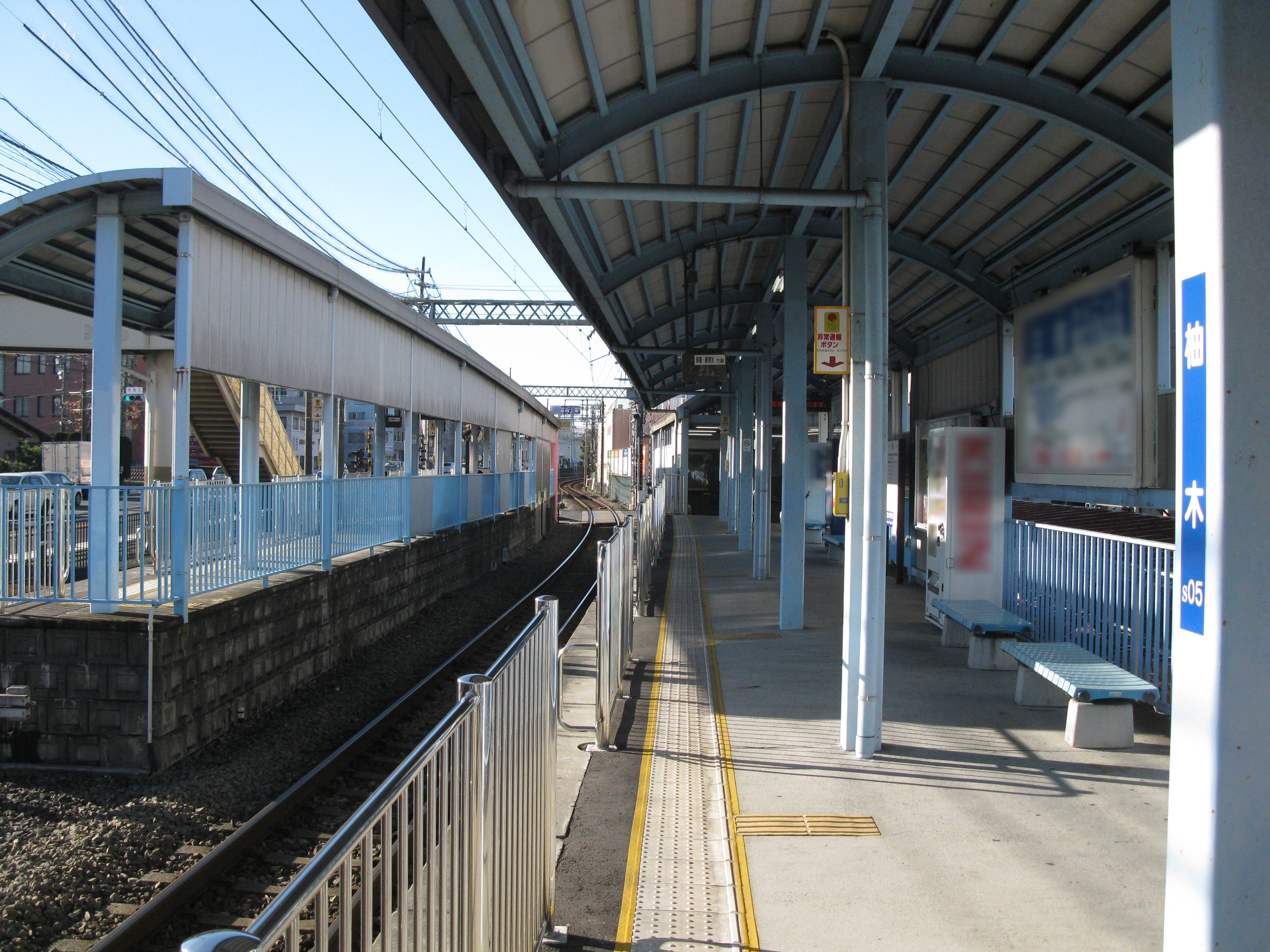
Platform

Yunoki Station (柚木駅, Yunoki-eki) is a railway station in Aoi-ku, Shizuoka, Shizuoka Prefecture, Japan, operated by the private railway company, Shizuoka Railway (Shizutetsu).

== Lines ==
Yunoki Station is a station on the Shizuoka–Shimizu Line and is 2.0 kilometers from the starting point of the line at Shin-Shizuoka Station.

== Station layout ==
The station has two parallel side platforms. The station building is built onto one end of one of the platforms, and has automated ticket machines, and automated turnstiles, which accept the LuLuCa smart card ticketing system as well as the PiTaPa and ICOCA IC cards.

=== Platforms ===
1	■ Shizuoka-Shimizu Line	for Kusanagi and Shin-Shimizu
2	■ Shizuoka–Shimizu Line	for Shin-Shizuoka

== Station History ==
Yunoki Station was established as Magarikane Station (曲金駅, Magarikane-eki) on December 9, 1908. It was renamed to Gokoku Jinjamae Station (護国神社前駅, Gokoku Jinjamae-eki) in 1942, due to its proximity to the Shizuoka Prefectural Gokoku Jinja, a Shinto shrine to the war dead, and branch of Yasukuni Shrine. The station received its present name after World War II.

== Passenger statistics ==
In fiscal 2019, the station was used by an average of 1591 passengers daily (boarding passengers only).

== Surrounding area ==
- Shizuoka Gokoku Jinja
- Tokai University Junior College
- JR Tokai Shizuoka Rail Yard

== See also ==
- List of railway stations in Japan
