= Otowachō Station =

Railway station in Shizuoka, Japan

Otowachō Station 音羽町駅
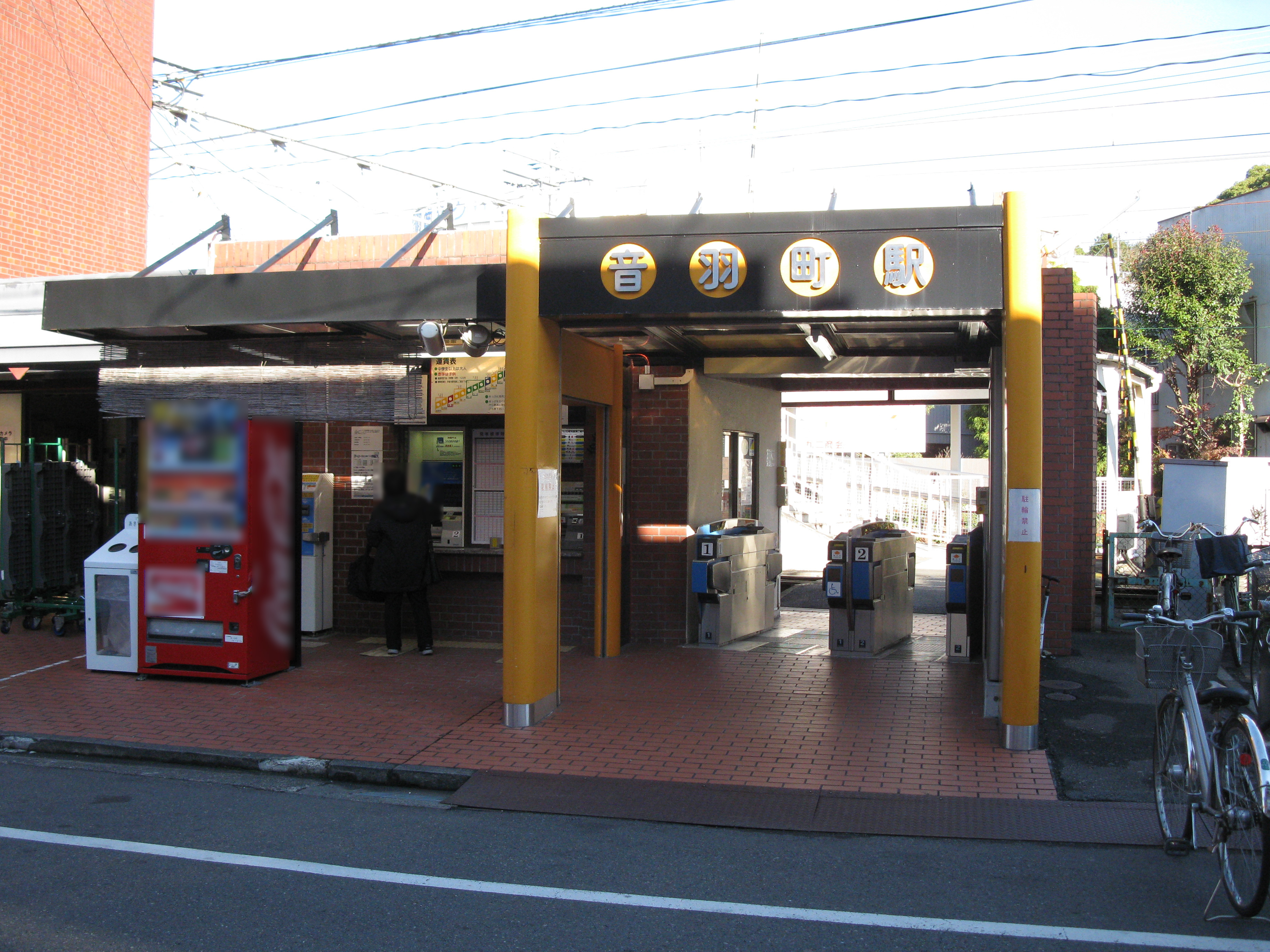
- Otowachō Station in December 2010

General information
- Location: Otowa-chō, Aoi-ku, Shizuoka-shi, Shizuoka-ken; Japan
- Coordinates: 34°58′42.11″N 138°23′45.62″E
- Operator: Shizuoka Railway
- Line: ■ Shizuoka–Shimizu Line
- Distance: 1.0 km from Shin-Shizuoka
- Platforms: 1 island platforms

Other information
- Status: Unstaffed
- Station code: S03

History
- Opened: December 9, 1908
- Former names: Kiyomizukōen (to 1945)

Passengers
- FY2017: 779 (daily)

Services
Preceding station	Shizuoka Railway	Following station
Hiyoshichō towards Shin-Shizuoka	Shizuoka–Shimizu Line Local	Kasugachō towards Shin-Shimizu
Location
- Location within Shizuoka Prefecture Location within Japan

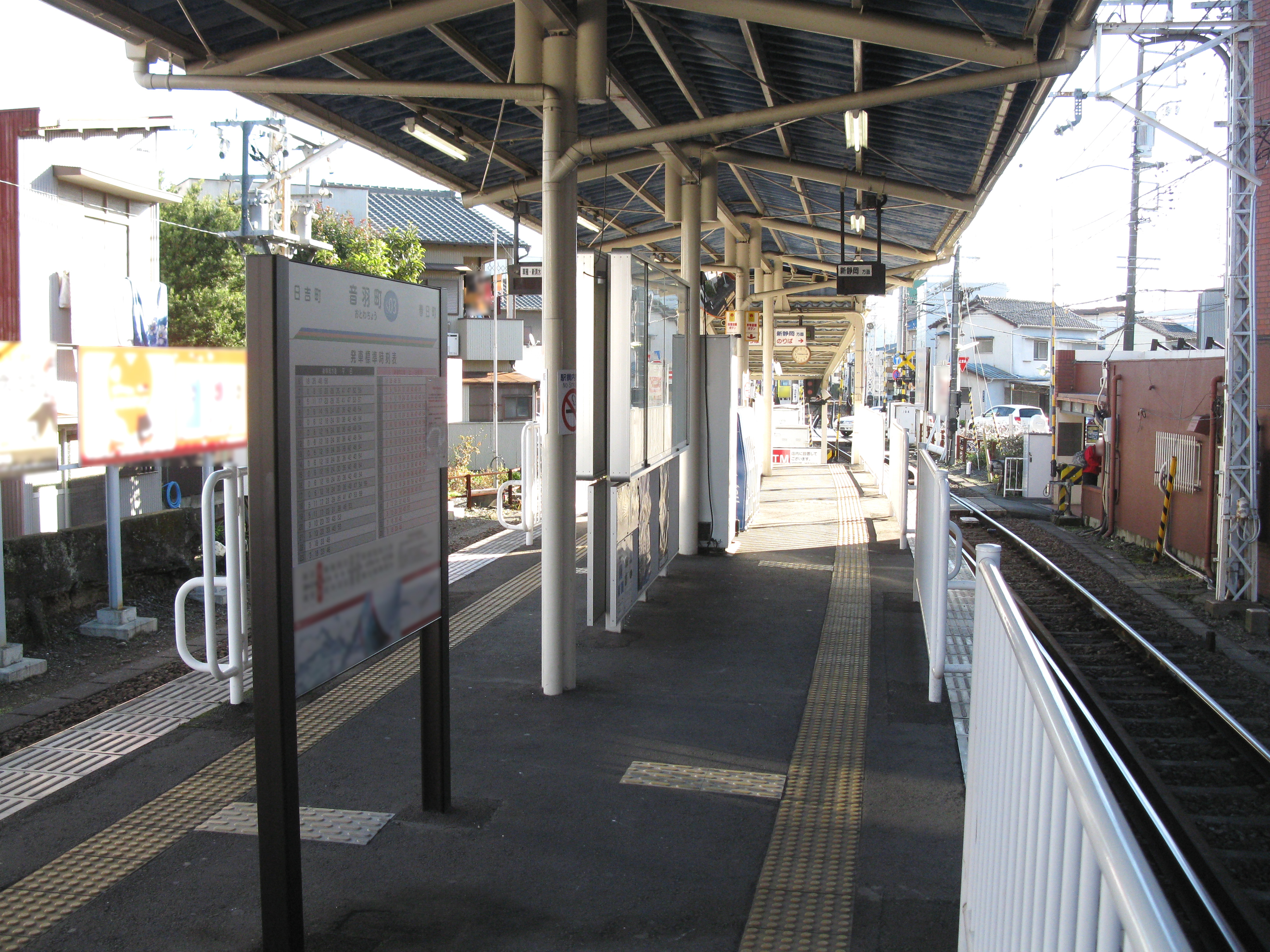
Platform

Otowachō Station (音羽町駅, Otowachō-eki) is a railway station in Aoi-ku, Shizuoka, Shizuoka Prefecture, Japan, operated by the private railway company, Shizuoka Railway (Shizutetsu).

== Lines ==
Otowachō Station is a station on the Shizuoka–Shimizu Line and is 1.0 kilometers from the starting point of the line at Shin-Shizuoka Station.

== Station layout ==
The station has a single island platform with a level crossing at one end. The station has automated ticket machines, and automated turnstiles, which accept the LuLuCa smart card ticketing system as well as the PiTaPa and ICOCA IC cards.

=== Platforms ===
1	■ Shizuoka-Shimizu Line	for Kusanagi and Shin-Shimizu
2	■ Shizuoka–Shimizu Line	for Shin-Shizuoka

== Station history ==
Otowachō Station was established as Kiyomizukōen Station (きよみず公園前駅, Kiyomizukōen-eki) on December 9, 1908. It was renamed to its present name after World War II.

== Passenger statistics ==
In fiscal 2017, the station was used by an average of 779 passengers daily (boarding passengers only).

== Surrounding area ==
- Japan National Route 1
- Shizuoka Gakuen School

== See also ==
- List of railway stations in Japan
