= Kasugachō Station =

Railway station in Shizuoka, Japan

Kasugachō Station 春日町駅
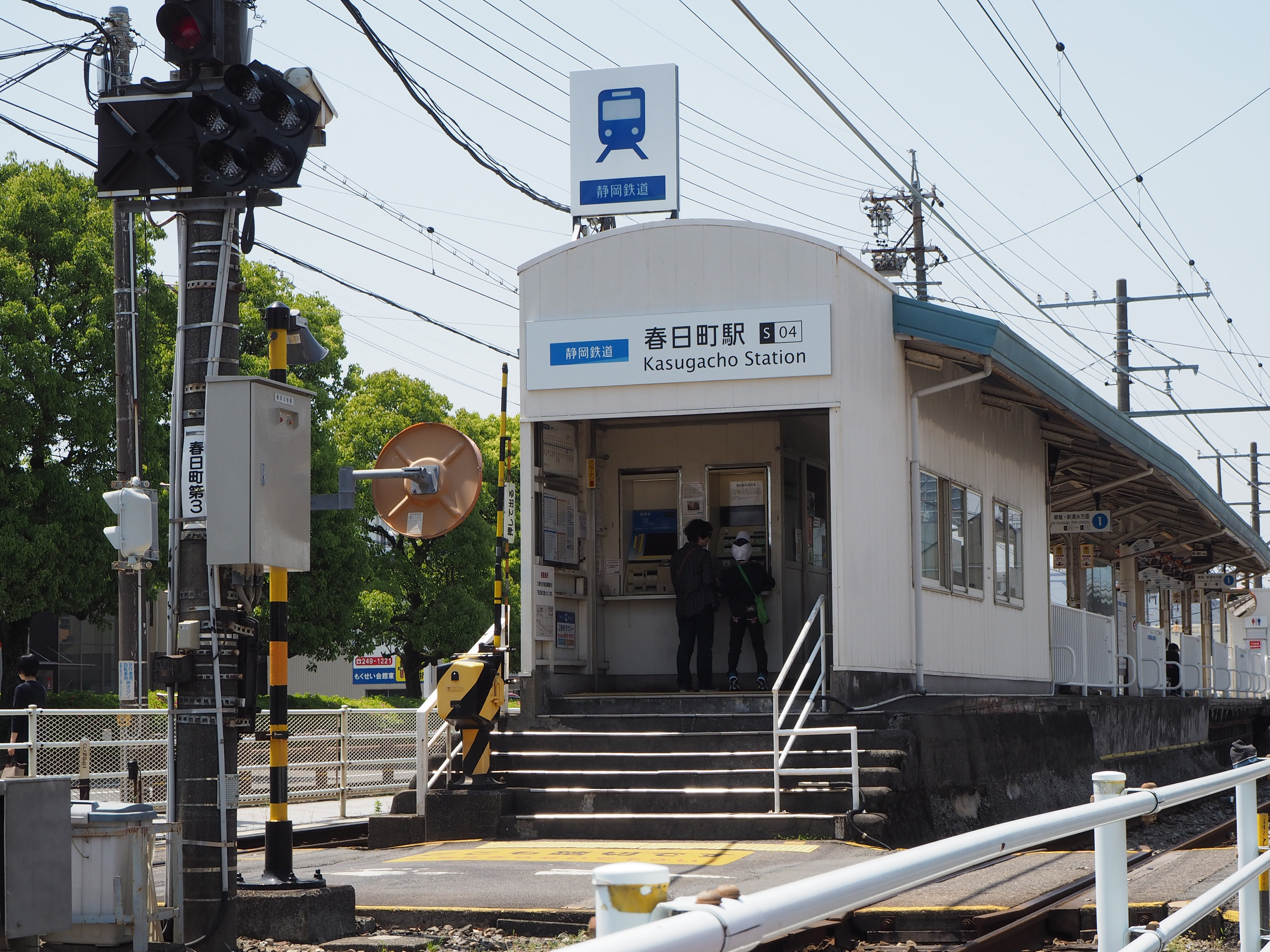
- Kasugachō Station in April 2018

General information
- Location: Kasuga 2-chōme, Aoi-ku, Shizuoka-shi, Shizuoka-ken; Japan
- Coordinates: 34°58′42.35″N 138°24′3.10″E
- Operator: Shizuoka Railway
- Line: ■ Shizuoka–Shimizu Line
- Distance: 1.5 km from Shin-Shizuoka
- Platforms: 1 island platform

Other information
- Status: Unstaffed
- Station code: S04

History
- Opened: April 2, 1930.

Passengers
- FY2017: 852 (daily)

Services
Preceding station	Shizuoka Railway	Following station
Otowachō towards Shin-Shizuoka	Shizuoka–Shimizu Line Local	Yunoki towards Shin-Shimizu
Location
- Location within Shizuoka Prefecture Location within Japan

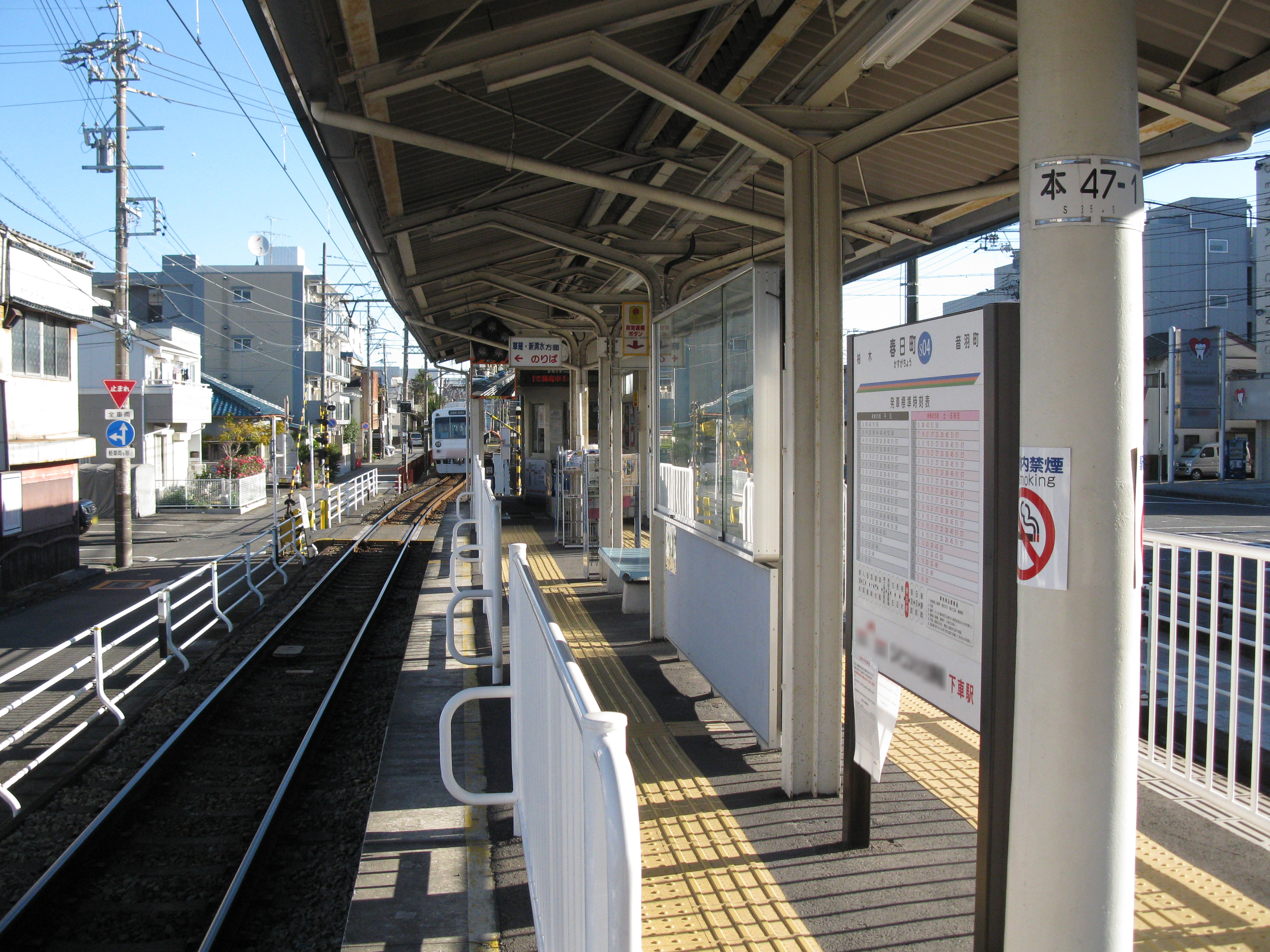
Platform

Kasugachō Station (春日町駅, Kasugachō-eki) is a railway station in Aoi-ku, Shizuoka, Shizuoka Prefecture, Japan, operated by the private railway company, Shizuoka Railway (Shizutetsu).

== Lines ==
Kasugachō Station is a station on the Shizuoka–Shimizu Line and is 1.5 kilometers from the starting point of the line at Shin-Shizuoka Station.

== Station layout ==
The station has a single island platform with a level crossing at one end. The station building is built on one end of the platform, and has automated ticket machines, and automated turnstiles, which accept the LuLuCa smart card ticketing system as well as the PiTaPa and ICOCA IC cards.

=== Platforms ===
1	■ Shizuoka-Shimizu Line	for Kusanagi and Shin-Shimizu
2	■ Shizuoka–Shimizu Line	for Shin-Shizuoka

== Station History ==
Kasugachō Station was established on April 2, 1930.

== Passenger statistics ==
In fiscal 2017, the station was used by an average of 852 passengers daily (boarding passengers only).

== Surrounding area ==
- Japan National Route 1
- Shizuoka Gakuen School

== See also ==
- List of railway stations in Japan
