= Arao (disambiguation) =

Arao, Kumamoto is a city in Kumamoto Province, Japan.

Arão, Portugal is a former parish in Valenca District, Portugal.

Arao or Arão may also refer to:

== People with the surname ==
- Emile Nguza Arao (fl. 2022), Kenyan engineer and executive
- Ford Arao (born 1984), Filipino basketball player and coach
- Okikatsu Arao (1902–1974), Japanese Imperial Army officer
- Souta Arao (born 2005), Japanese racing driver
- Willian Arão (born 1992), Brazilian footballer

== See also ==
- Arao Station (disambiguation)
- Administrative and Recruitment Affairs Organization (ARAO), Iran
- Araos (disambiguation)
