= Tōkaidō Main Line =

Railway line in Japan

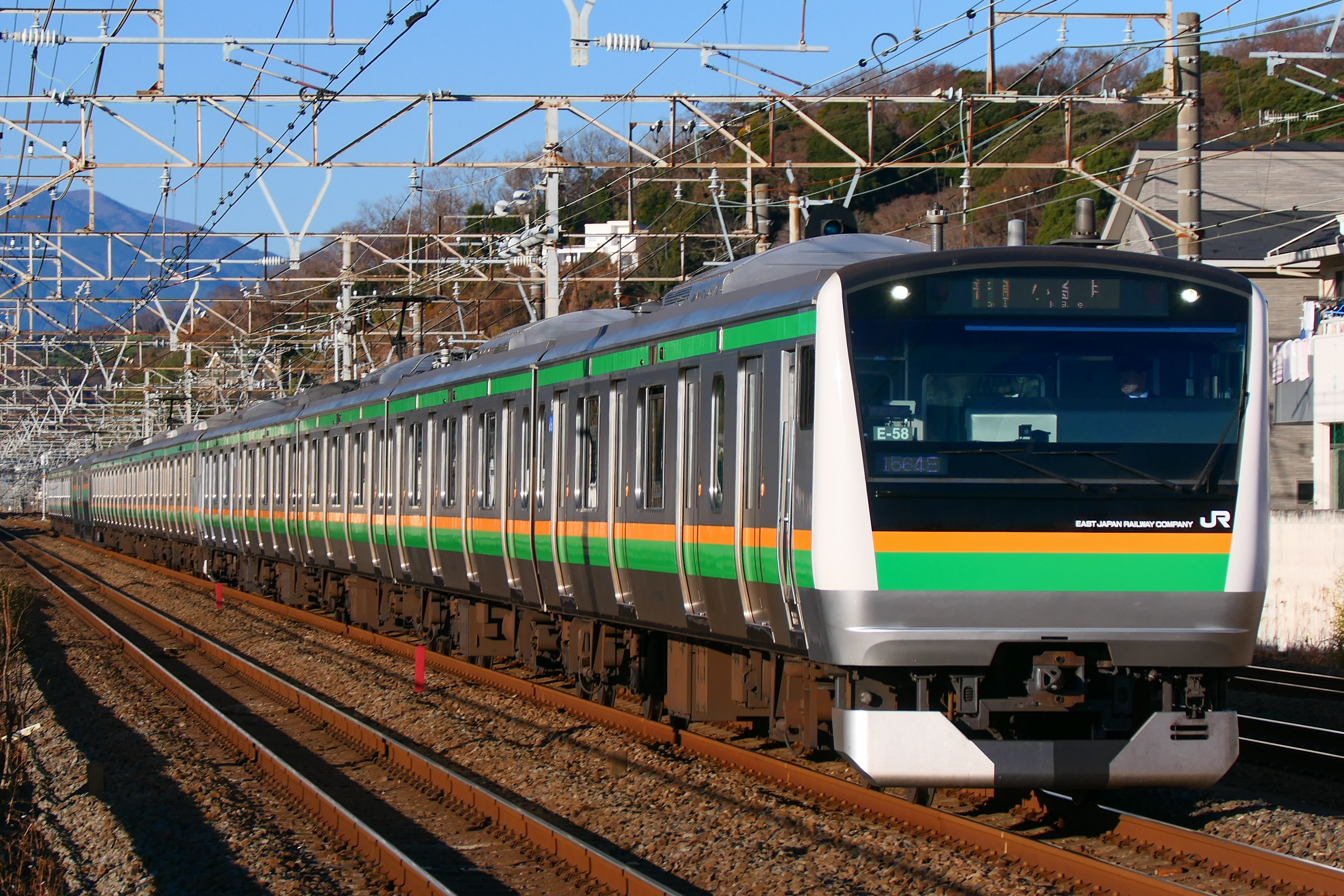
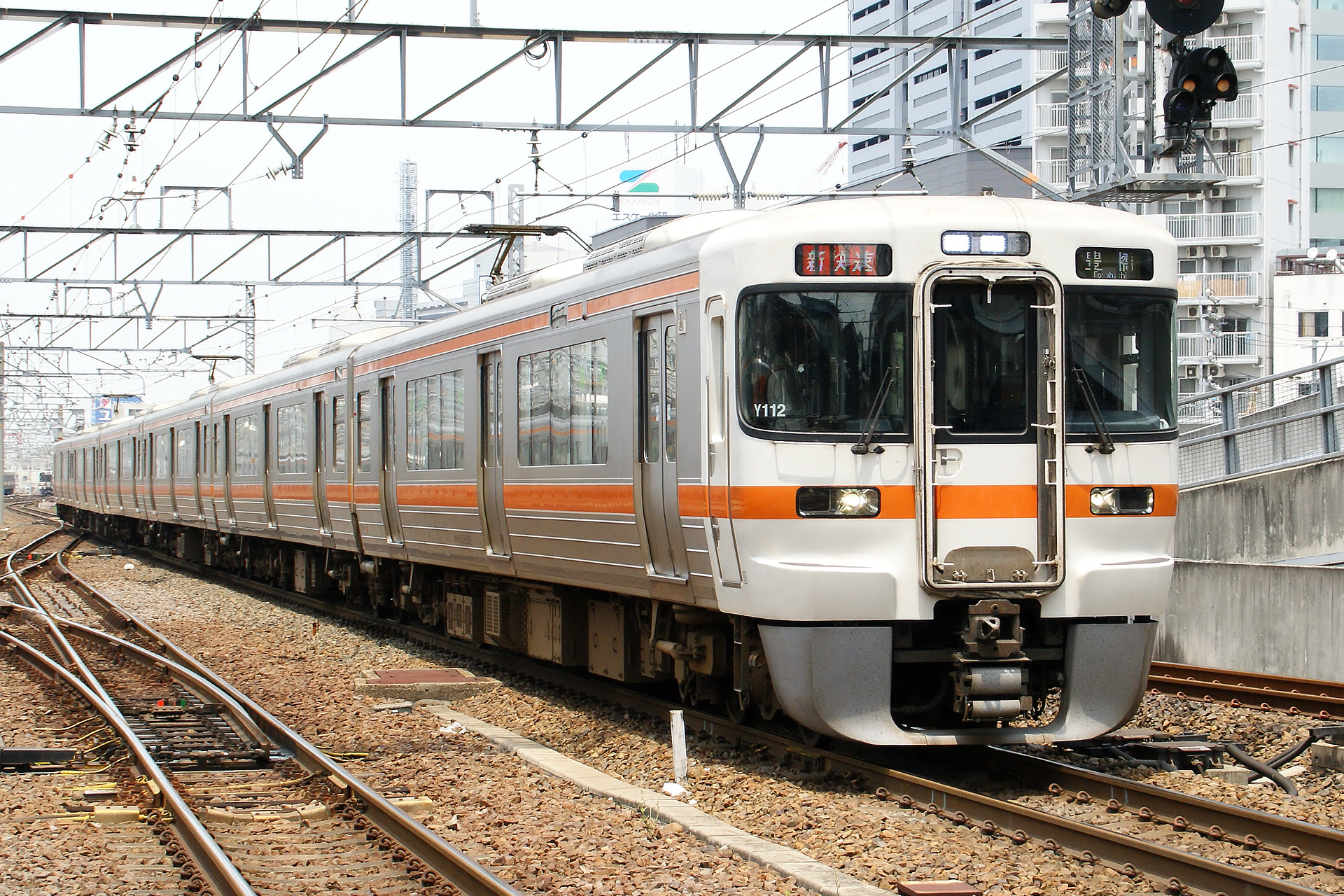
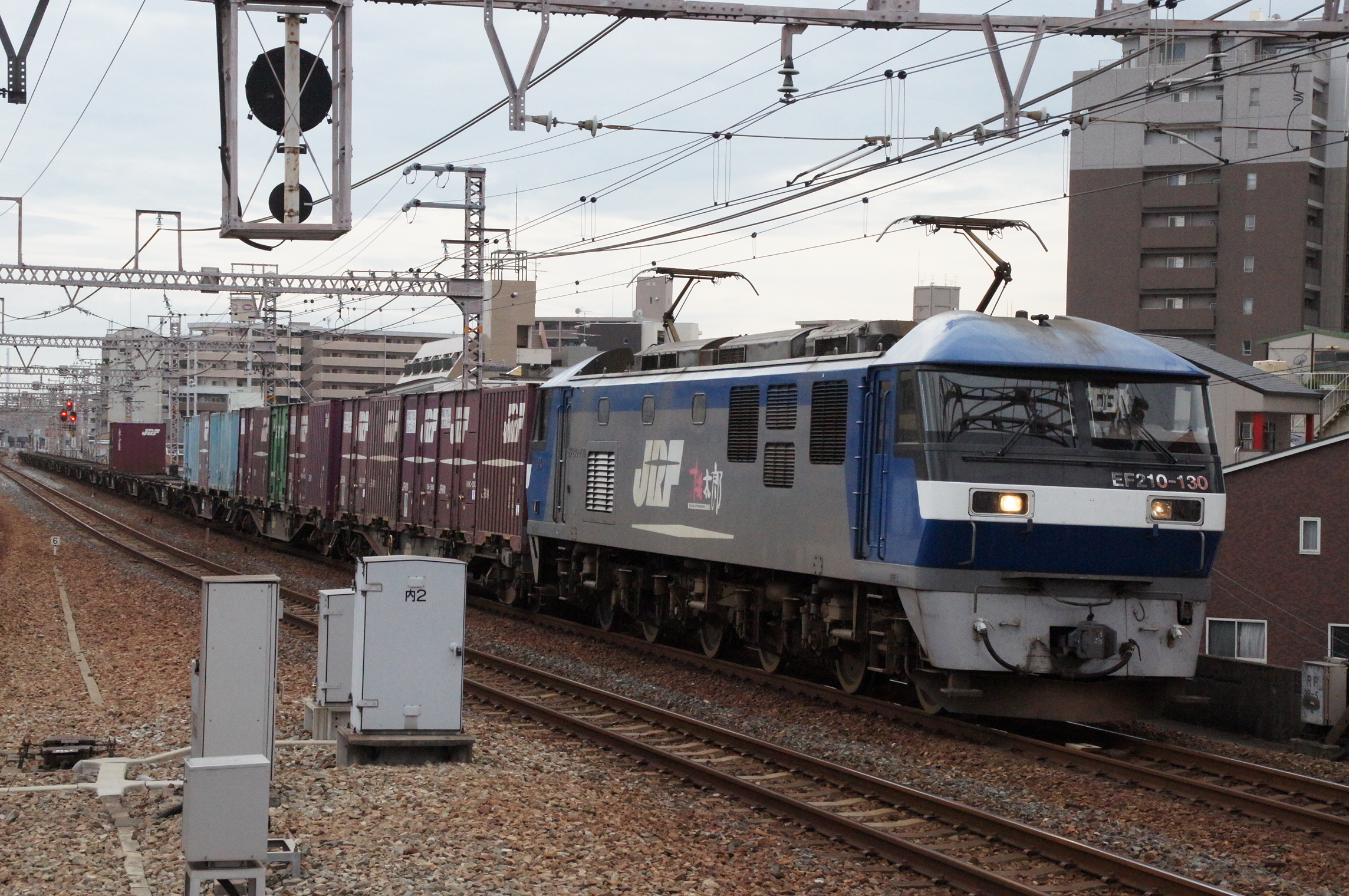
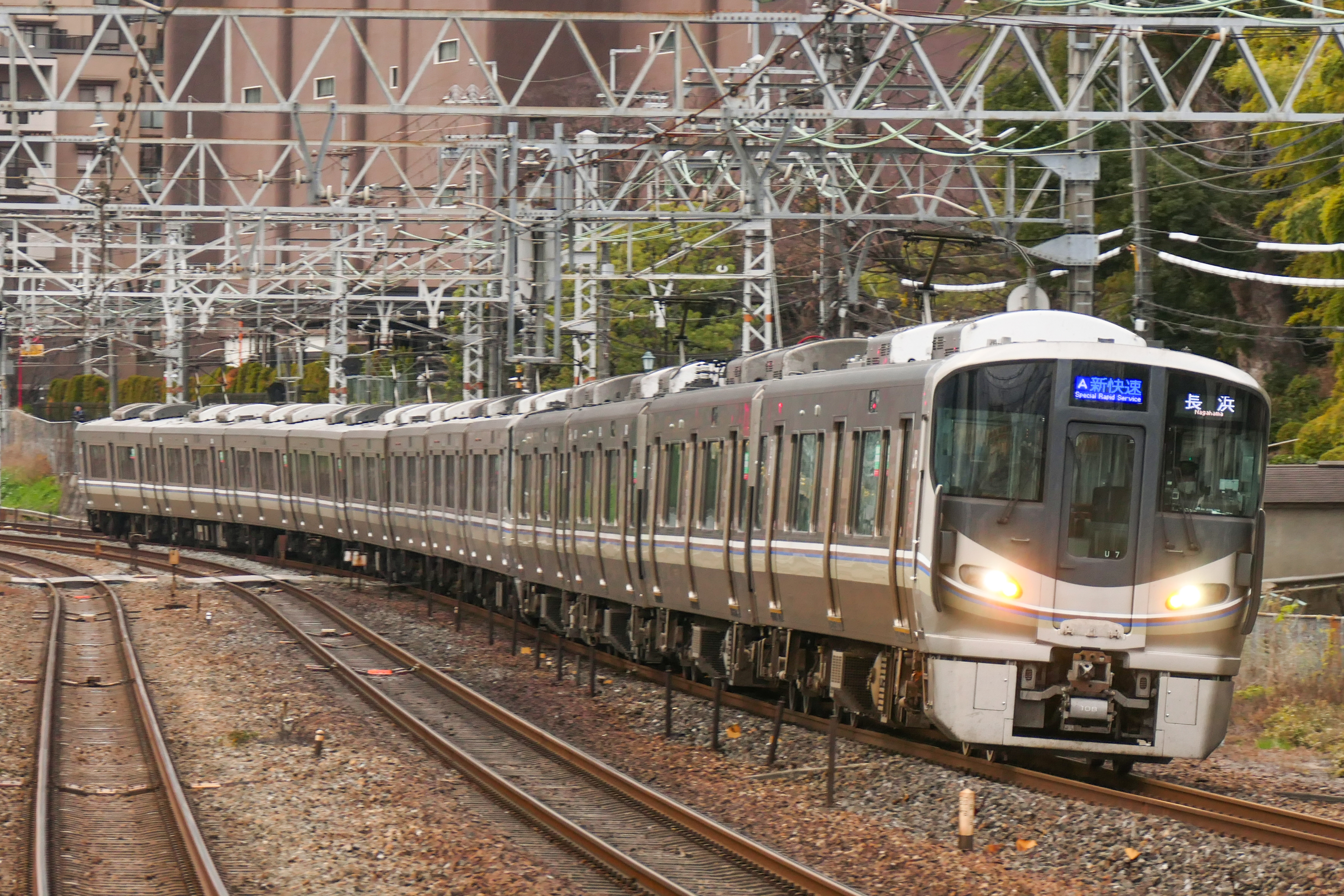
- Trains on the Tōkaidō Line. Clockwise from top left: JR East E233-3000 series; JR Central 313-5000 series; JR West 225-100 series; JR Freight Class EF210

Overview
- Other names: Biwako Line (JR West, Maibara – Kyoto); JR Kyōto Line (JR West, Kyoto – Osaka); JR Kōbe Line (JR-West, Osaka – Kobe)
- Native name: 東海道本線
- Locale: Kantō, Tōkai, Kansai regions
- Termini: Tokyo; Kōbe
- Stations: 166 (passenger only)

Service
- Type: Heavy rail
- Operator(s): JR East; JR Central; JR West; JR Freight

History
- Opened: 14 October 1872; 153 years ago

Technical
- Track length: 589.5 km (366.3 mi)
- Track gauge: 1,067 mm (3 ft 6 in)
- Electrification: Overhead line, 1,500 V DC
- Operating speed: 130 km/h (81 mph)

The Tōkaidō Main Line (Japanese: 東海道本線, romanized: Tōkaidō-honsen) is one of the most important railway corridors in Japan, connecting the major cities of Tokyo and Kobe via Shizuoka, Nagoya, Kyoto and Osaka. The line, with termini at Tokyo and Kobe stations, is 589.5 km (366.3 mi) long, not counting its many freight feeder lines around the major cities. The high-speed Tōkaidō Shinkansen largely parallels the line.

The term "Tōkaidō Main Line" is largely a holdover from pre-Shinkansen days; now various portions of the line have different names which are officially used by JR East, JR Central, and JR West. Today, the only daily passenger train that travels the entire length of the line is the combined Sunrise Izumo/Sunrise Seto service which runs overnight. During the day, longer intercity trips using the line require several transfers along the way. Trips between the same pairs of major cities may instead be made on the Tokaido Shinkansen.

The Tōkaidō Main Line is owned and operated by three Japan Railways Group (JR Group) companies:

- East Japan Railway Company (JR East) (Tokyo - Atami) - Tōkaidō Line
- Central Japan Railway Company (JR Central) (Atami - Maibara) - Tōkaidō Line
- West Japan Railway Company (JR West) (Maibara - Kōbe) - Biwako Line, JR Kyōto Line, JR Kōbe Line

== History ==
=== Completion and early days, 1872–1913 ===
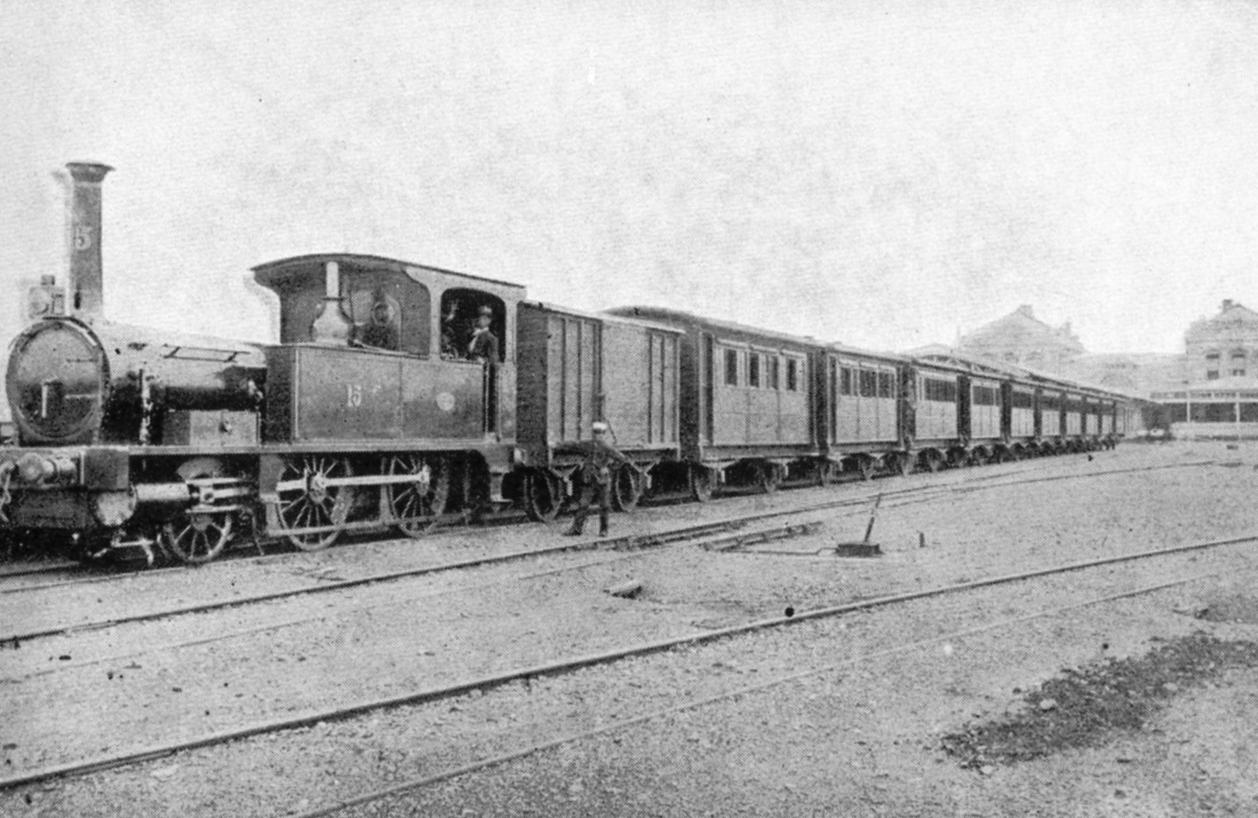
Train hauled by a JGR Class 160 locomotive at Shimbashi Station, c. 1875

The Tōkaidō route takes its name from the ancient road connecting the Kansai region (Kyoto, Osaka) with the Kantō region (Tokyo, then Edo) through the Tōkai region (including Nagoya). Its name meant "Tōkai road", or the road running through Tōkai. The Tōkaidō Line does not follow the old road exactly, since the latter diverges at Nagoya toward the Mie Prefecture coastline; to follow it by train, the Kansai Main Line and Kusatsu Line would have to be followed from Nagoya to Kusatsu. Japan's largest population centers are all along this route: Tokyo, Yokohama, Nagoya, Kyoto, Osaka, and Kobe. Since construction of the line, these centers have since grown to occupy an ever more dominant role in the country's government, financial, manufacturing, and cultural life.

Historically, one of the first priorities of Japanese railway planners was to build a line from Tokyo to the Kansai region, either following the Tōkaidō route or the northern Nakasendō route. This decision remained unresolved as regional needs were addressed. The first railway in Japan was the line from Shimbashi to Sakuragicho in Yokohama, which opened in 1872; another segment of today's Tokaido Main Line, between Kyoto and Kobe, opened in 1877.

In 1883, the government decided to use the Nakasendō route, and construction of several segments commenced (including the modern-day Takasaki Line). Railways were opened between Ogaki and Nagahama (1884) and between Nagoya and Kisogawa (1886) in line with the Nakasendo plan. However, by 1886, it was clear that the Tōkaidō route would be more practical, and so the Nakasendo plan was abandoned.

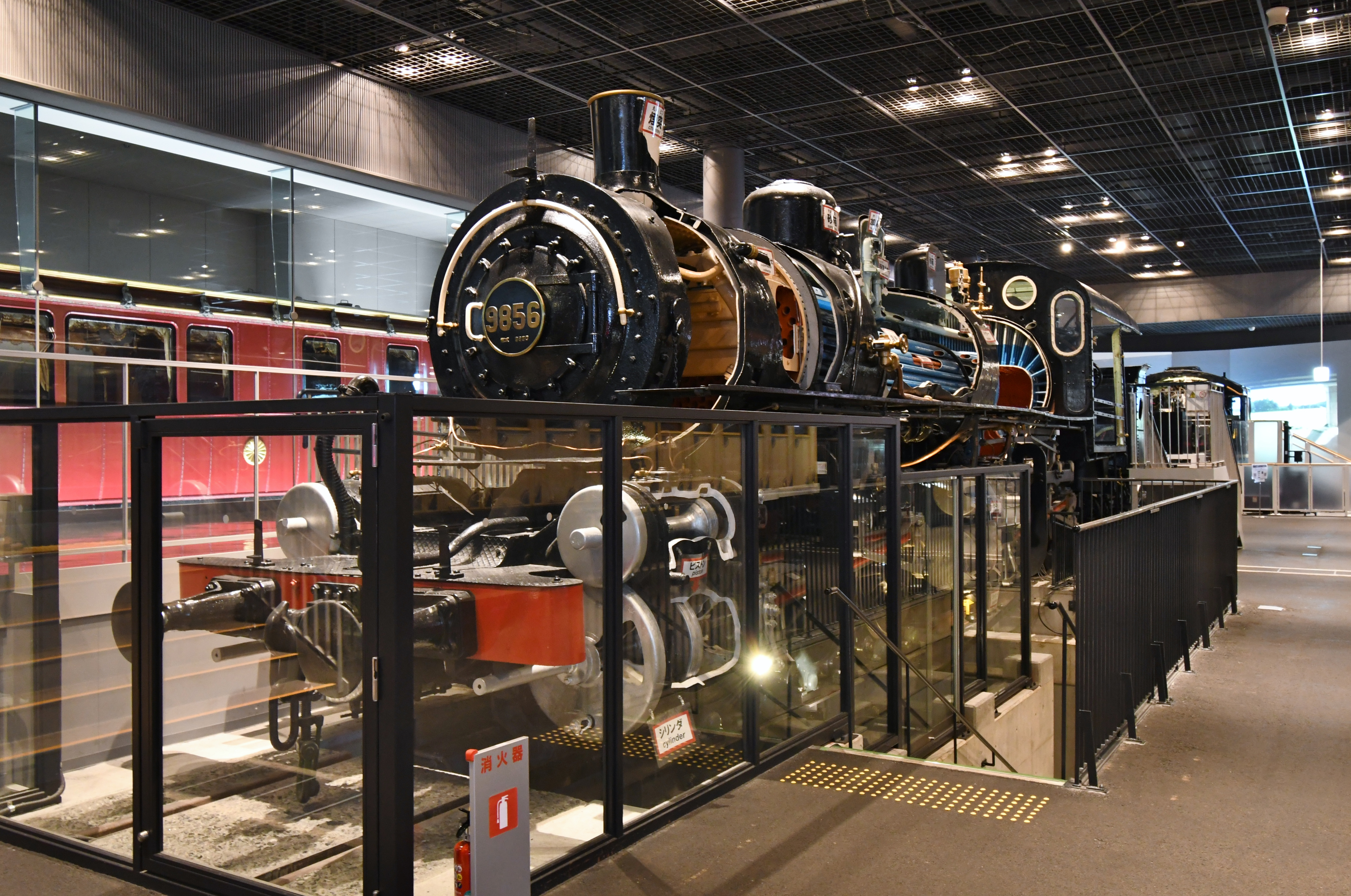
JGR Class 9850 Mallet locomotives (1912) were used as bank engines on the mountainous Gotemba stretch of the line; this example is preserved at the Railway Museum.

The lines between Kisogawa and Ogaki, Yokohama and Kozu, and Hamamatsu and Obu were completed in 1887, and the first line from Tokyo to Kobe was completed in 1889, when Kozu and Hamamatsu were connected through the present-day Gotemba Line corridor. The final segments were completed between Kasumigahara and Otsu. At the time, there was one Tokyo–Kobe train in each direction per day, taking over 20 hours each way. The "Tokaido Line" name was formally adopted in 1895. In October 1895, following the Sino-Japanese War, through service to the Sanyo Railway (now the San'yō Main Line) began.

Express service between Tokyo and Kobe began in 1896, sleeper service in 1900, and dining car service in 1901. In 1906, all privately run main lines were nationalized under the newly created Japanese Government Railways, which at the time had a network of just over 7,000 km (4,300 mi) of track.

=== Capacity expansion and route changes, 1914–1945 ===
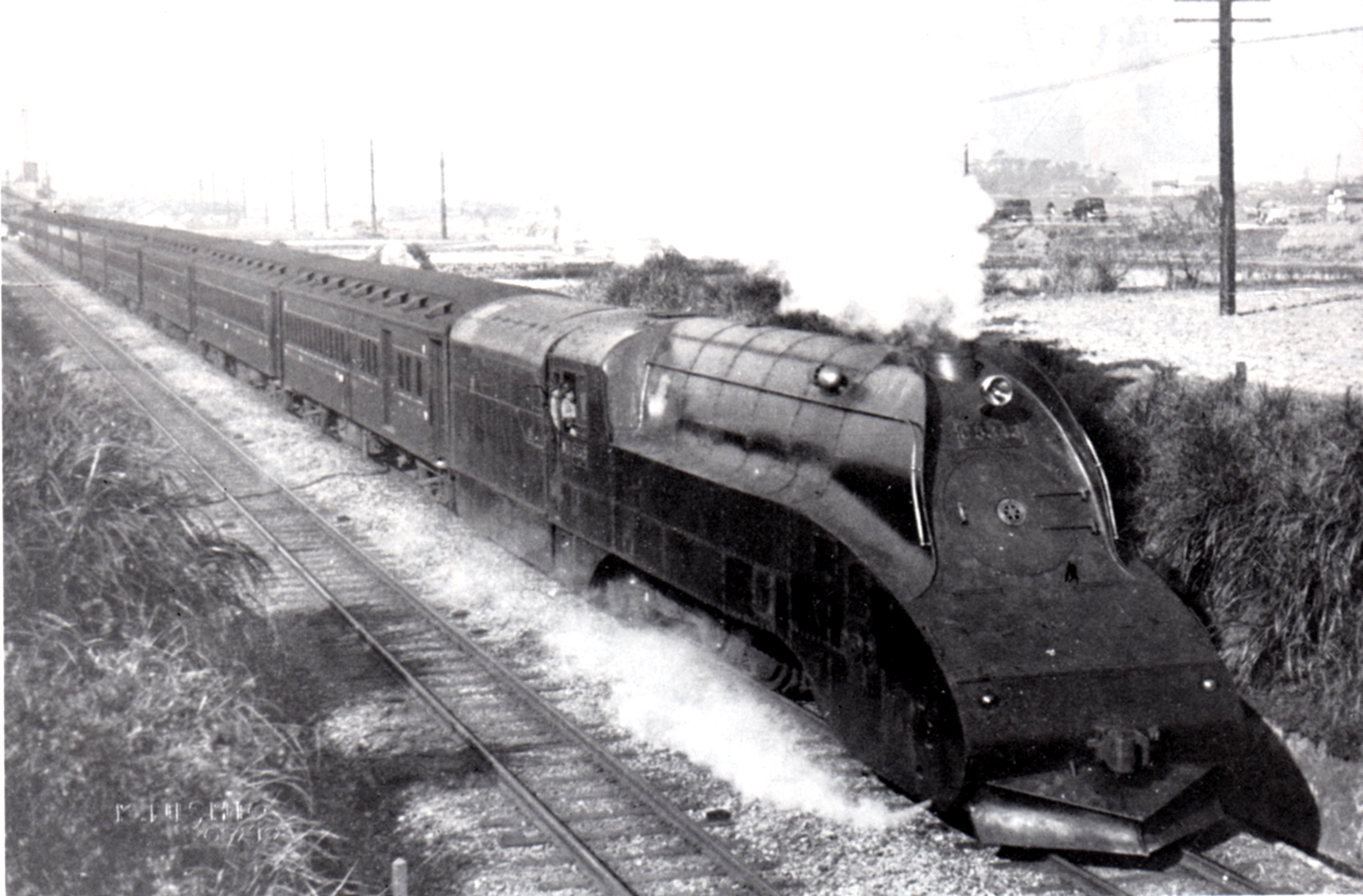
JNR Class C53 hauling the Tsubame near Nishi-Akashi, 9 December 1934

On 20 December 1914, Tokyo Station opened and succeeded Shimbashi Station as the Tokyo-side terminus of the line. On the same day, an electrified commuter line was inaugurated along the section between Tokyo Station and today’s Yokohama Station, which is now part of the Keihin–Tōhoku Line. Automatic couplers were introduced on all freight wagons in 1926. In 1930, the first Tsubame ("swallow") express was introduced, reducing the Tokyo - Kobe travel-time to nine hours - a significant reduction from the twenty hours required in 1889 and fifteen in 1903.

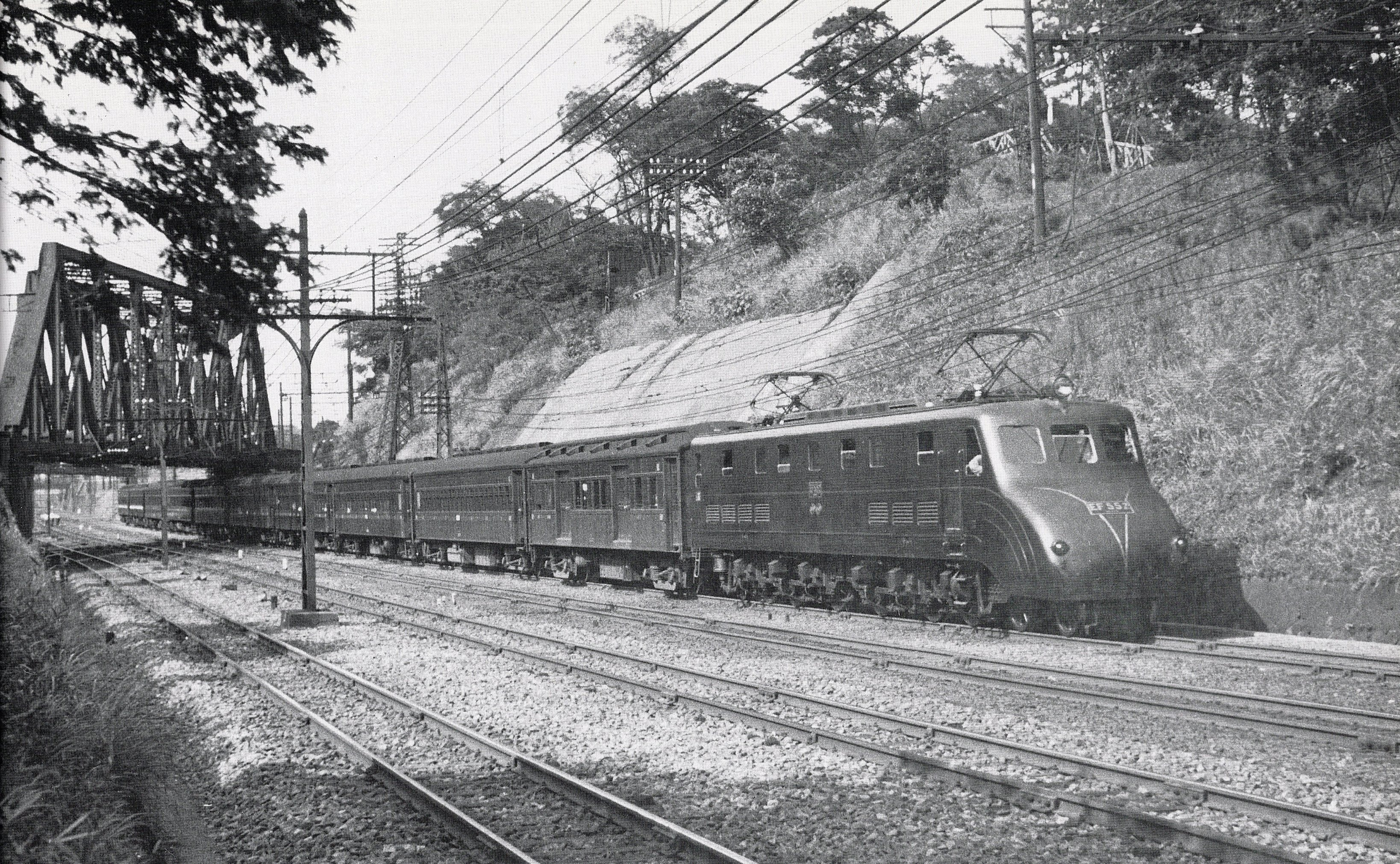
JNR Class EF55 hauling the Fuji (Tokyo–Shimonoseki express) near Shinagawa, 4 August 1936

By the start of the Taishō era, route changes on several stretches of the line were deemed necessary to accommodate growing demand. The route bypassing Osakayama (between Ōtsu and Kyoto Stations), in use since 1878, was closed when the current, less steep route with two long tunnels was completed on 25 September 1919. The mountainous Gotemba stretch required an even larger-scale route change, culminating in the completion of the Tanna Tunnel in 1934 after 15 years of construction. The new route through the tunnel is 11.2 kilometres long, compared to the old Gotemba route, which took a 60.2-kilometre detour around the Tanna Basin. With the opening of the tunnel, the section between Tokyo and Numazu was fully electrified, as steam locomotives were unable to operate through the long tunnel safely.

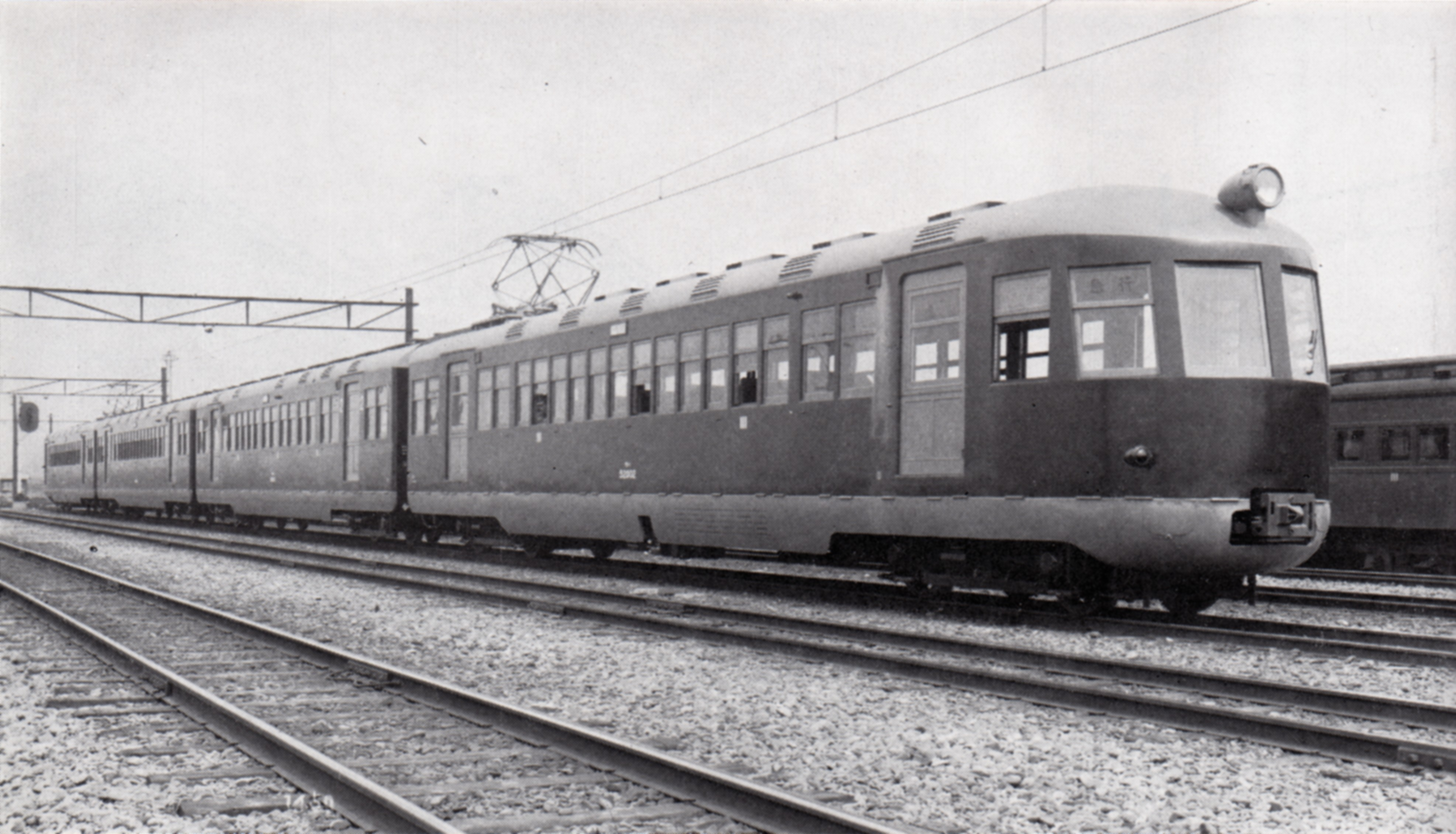
52 Series EMUs were used for commuter services between Kyoto and Kobe following the electrification of the section.

Electrification also progressed on the other end of the line around the same time, in 1934. Commuter rapid services between Kyoto and Kobe, using 52 Series streamliner EMUs, began in 1937. However, further electrification of the line was overshadowed by the Second World War and did not resume until after the war. For security reasons, the army preferred to keep the middle portion of the line unelectrified, as unelectrified tracks were much easier to repair in the event of an enemy attack.

During the war, the line's focus shifted towards freight services. Express services were significantly reduced, and sleepers and restaurant cars were withdrawn from service in 1944. JNR Class D52 locomotives were introduced for wartime freight transport, but their poor manufacturing quality led to several boiler explosion accidents.

=== As the main transport artery of postwar Japan, 1945–1964 ===
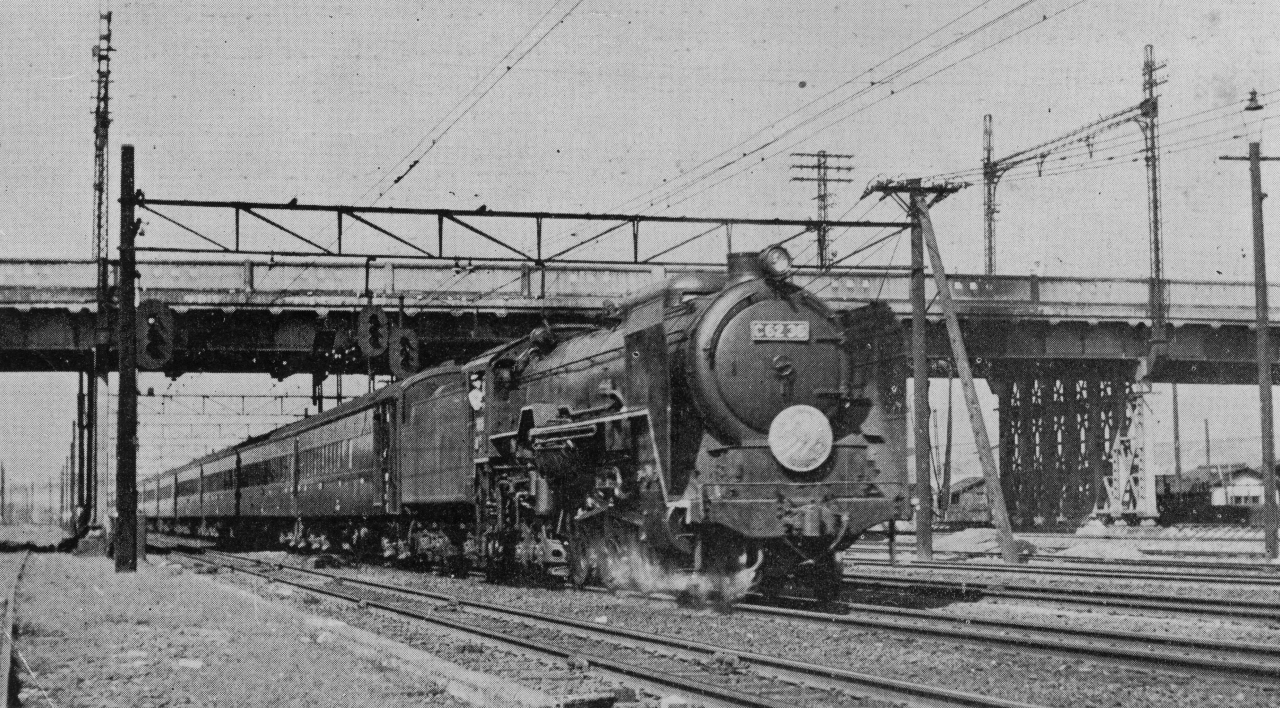
JNR Class C62 hauling the Tsubame near Kyoto, c. 1954

In the immediate aftermath of the war, almost all surviving express train carriages were requisitioned by the Allied Occupation Forces. Services such as the Allied Limited (Tokyo–Moji), Dixie Limited (Tokyo–Hakata), and the BCOF Train (Tokyo–Kure) operated on the Tōkaidō Line. Express trains for Japanese nationals resumed in April 1947, with sleeper services following in July 1948.

In 1949, the Limited Express Heiwa, a successor to the pre-war Tsubame service, and the sleeper express Ginga both began operating between Tokyo and Osaka. In January 1950, Heiwa was renamed Tsubame. Makeshift D52 freight locomotives were converted into C62 express locomotives, the largest and fastest steam engines in Japan's rail history, to haul these services. One of the C62s, C62 17, holds the narrow-gauge steam world speed record, which was achieved on the Tōkaidō Line near Nagoya on 15 December 1954, and is preserved at the SCMaglev and Railway Park.

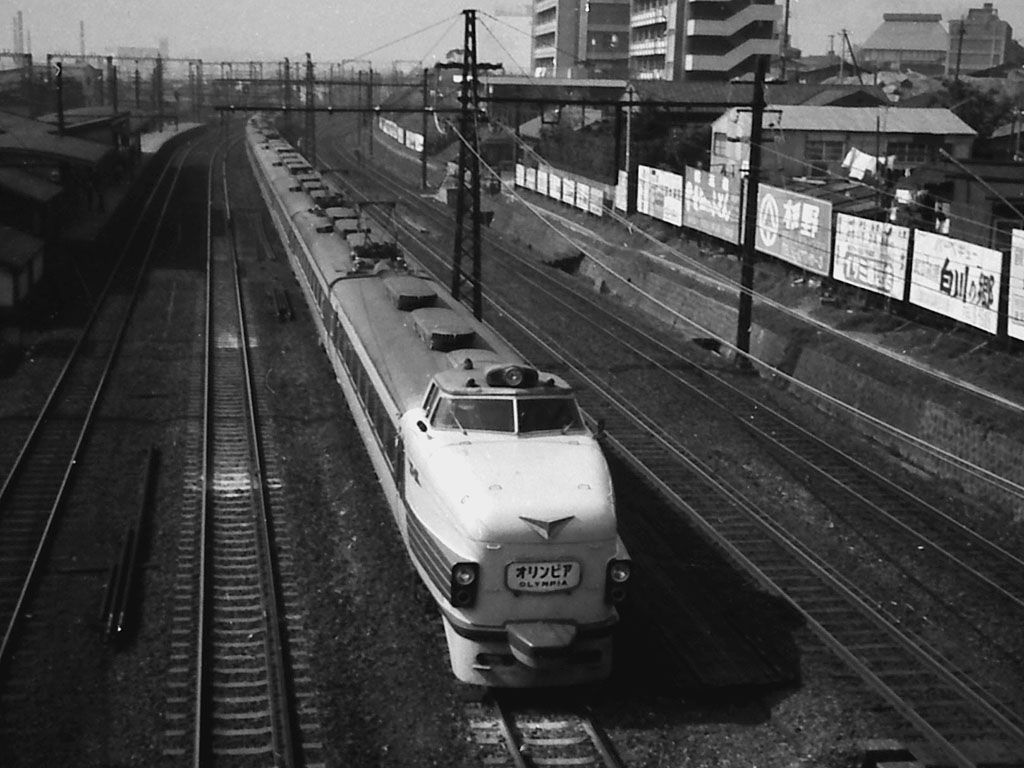
151 series EMUs, which were originally introduced for the Kodama, near Shin-Koyasu, circa 1964.

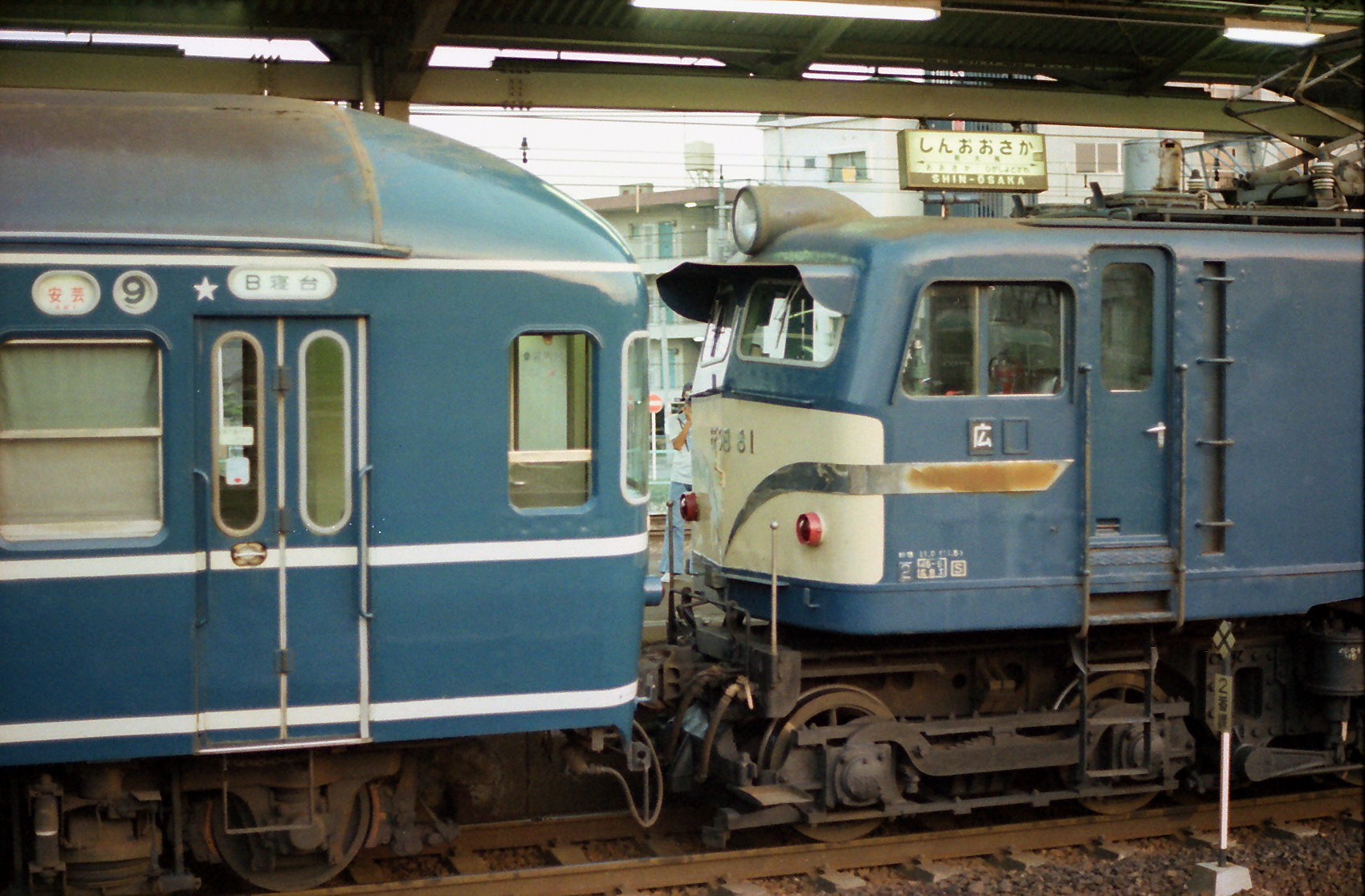
20 series carriages, the first-generation Blue Train carriages, hauled by a Class EF58 locomotive at Shin-Osaka Station, circa 1977

On 19 November 1956, the line was fully electrified. The Tokyo–Osaka express trains, Tsubame and Hato, began to be hauled by JNR EF58 locomotives for the entire length of the route, reducing travel time from 8 hours to 7 hours and 30 minutes. With no concerns about smoke polluting the carriages, these trains were painted light green and nicknamed Aodaishō (green snakes, referring to the Japanese rat snake).

On 1 October 1958, the Kodama, the first limited express service operated by EMUs rather than locomotive-hauled carriages, commenced. This service further reduced travel time to 6 hours and 50 minutes. The Series 151 EMUs marked a significant milestone in railway technology, as EMUs were previously considered unsuitable for high-speed and long-distance services due to issues like noise, vibration, and cost. Since then, all non-sleeper express rolling stock, including the Shinkansen, has been designed as EMUs. On the same day, the Asakaze sleeper express entered service with the newly built Series 20 carriages. These carriages were fully air-conditioned and nicknamed the 'hotel on the rail'. Because these sleeper carriages and their successors were painted blue, sleeper trains in Japan came to be known as Blue Trains.

=== After the opening of the Tōkaidō Shinkansen, 1964–1987 ===
The capacity constraints on the Tōkaidō Main Line had been clear prior to World War II, and work started on a new 1,435 mm (4 ft 8 1/2 in) standard gauge "bullet train" line in 1959. Intercity passenger traffic between Tokyo, Nagoya and Osaka largely transferred to the Tōkaidō Shinkansen after it was completed in 1964. Since then, the Tōkaidō Main Line has been used as a commuter and freight line, serving a very small number of long-distance passenger trains (mainly overnight and sleeper services).

=== Privatisation, 1987–present ===
Following the Hanshin earthquake on 17 January 1995, the line was shut down between Takatsuki and Kobe, with certain segments remaining impassable until 1 April of that year.

On 20 August 2016, station numbering was introduced, with stations between Tokyo and Ōfuna assigned station numbers of JT01 to JT07. Numbers increase towards in the southbound direction towards Ōfuna. Station numbers would be assigned to stations beyond Ōfuna as far as Atami in 2018.

On the evening of 5 August 2023, a JR East Tōkaidō Line service struck a utility pole near Ōfuna and lost power, resulting in a suspension of service. Four people, including the driver, sustained minor injuries. Service was restored on the morning of 6 August 2023.

== Basic data ==
- Total distance: 713.6 km (443.4 mi) (including branch lines; Tokyo – Kōbe is 589.5 km (366.3 mi))
  - East Japan Railway Company (JR East) (Services and tracks)
    - Tokyo – Atami: 104.6 km (65.0 mi)
    - Shinagawa – Shin-Kawasaki – Tsurumi: 17.8 km (11.1 mi)
    - Hamamatsuchō – Tokyo Freight Terminal – Kawasaki Freight Terminal – Hama-Kawasaki: 20.6 km (12.8 mi) (Tōkaidō Freight Line)
    - Tsurumi – Hatchō-Nawate: 2.3 km (1.4 mi) (Tōkaidō Freight Line)
    - Tsurumi – Higashi-Takashima – Sakuragichō: 8.5 km (5.3 mi) (Takashima Line)
    - Tsurumi – Yokohama-Hazawa – Higashi-Totsuka: 16.0 km (9.9 mi) (Tōkaidō Freight Line)
  - Central Japan Railway Company (JR Central) (Services and tracks)
    - Atami – Maibara: 341.3 km (212.1 mi) (3.3 km (2.1 mi) between Kanayama – Nagoya overlaps with Chuo Main Line)
    - Ōgaki – Mino-Akasaka: 5.0 km (3.1 mi) (Mino-Akasaka branch line)
    - Ōgaki – (Shin-Tarui) – Sekigahara: 13.8 km (8.6 mi) (Shin-Tarui Line)
  - West Japan Railway Company (JR West) (Services and tracks)
    - Maibara – Kōbe: 143.6 km (89.2 mi)
    - Kyōto Freight Terminal – Tambaguchi: 3.3 km (2.1 mi) (not in use by passenger trains)
    - Suita – (Miyahara Rail Yard) – Amagasaki: 10.7 km (6.6 mi) (Hoppō Freight Line)
    - Suita – Umeda – Fukushima: 8.5 km (5.3 mi) (Umeda Freight Line, used by Haruka and Kuroshio limited expresses)
  - Japan Freight Railway Company (JR Freight) (Tracks and services)
    - Sannō Signal – Nagoya-Minato: 6.2 km (3.9 mi) (Nagoya-Minato Line)
    - Suita Signal – Osaka Freight Terminal: 8.7 km (5.4 mi) (Osaka Terminal Line)
  - Japan Freight Railway Company (JR Freight) (Services only)
    - Shinagawa – Atami: 97.8 km (60.8 mi)
    - Shinagawa – Shin-Tsurumi Signal: 13.9 km (8.6 mi)
    - Tokyo Freight Terminal – Hama-Kawasaki: 12.9 km (8.0 mi)
    - Tsurumi – Yokohama-Hazawa – Higashi-Totsuka: 16.0 km (9.9 mi)
    - Tsurumi – Hatchō-Nawate: 2.3 km (1.4 mi)
    - Tsurumi – Shinkō – Sakuragichō: 11.2 km (7.0 mi)
    - Atami – Maibara: 341.3 km (212.1 mi)
    - Minami-Arao Signal – Sekigahara: 10.7 km (6.6 mi)
    - Minami-Arao Signal – Mino-Akasaka: 1.9 km (1.2 mi)
    - Maibara – Kōbe: 139.0 km (86.4 mi) (via Hoppō Freight Line)
    - Kyōto Freight Terminal – Tambaguchi: 3.3 km (2.1 mi)
    - Suita – Umeda – Fukushima: 8.5 km (5.3 mi)
- Gauge: 1,067 mm (3 ft 6 in) Narrow gauge railway
- Stations:
  - Passenger: 166 (does not include Shinagawa – Shin-Kawasaki – Tsurumi section or branches other than Mino-Akasaka branch line)
    - JR East: 34
    - JR Central: 82
    - JR West: 50
  - Freight only: 14
- Tracks:
  - Four or more
    - Tokyo – Odawara: 83.9 km (52.1 mi)
    - Nagoya – Inazawa: 11.1 km (6.9 mi)
    - Kusatsu – Kōbe: 98.1 km (61.0 mi)
  - Two
    - Odawara – Nagoya
    - Inazawa – Kusatsu
    - Shinagawa – Shin-Kawasaki – Tsurumi
    - Hamamatsuchō – Tokyo Freight Terminal – Kawasaki Freight Terminal – Hama-Kawasaki
    - Tsurumi – Hatchō-Nawate
    - Tsurumi – Higashi-Takashima
    - Tsurumi – Yokohama-Hazawa – Higashi-Totsuka
    - Suita – Umeda
    - Suita – (Miyahara Rail Yard) – Amagasaki
  - Single-track: All other sections
- Electrification: 1,500 V DC (except for Sannō Signal – Nagoya-Minato)
- Railway signalling: Automatic Train Control
- Maximum speed:
  - Tokyo – Ōfuna, Odawara – Toyohashi: 110 km/h (68 mph)
  - Ōfuna – Odawara, Toyohashi – Maibara: 120 km/h (75 mph)
  - Minami-Arao Signal – Tarui – Sekigahara, Minami-Arao Signal – Mino-Akasaka: 85 km/h (53 mph)
  - Maibara – Kōbe: 130 km/h (81 mph) (Special Rapid Shin-Kaisoku only, local trains max at 120 km/h or 75 mph)

== Station list ==
=== JR East ===
The section between Tokyo and Atami is operated by East Japan Railway Company (JR East) and it is located in the Greater Tokyo Area. It has local services (Japanese: 普通, romanized: Futsū) and a rapid service called Rapid Acty (Japanese: 快速アクティー, romanized: Kaisoku Akutī). It runs on dedicated tracks parallel to the Yamanote Line between Tokyo and Shinagawa, the Keihin–Tōhoku Line between Tokyo and Yokohama, and the Yokosuka Line between Yokohama and Ōfuna. Some Shōnan–Shinjuku Line trains share the segment south of Yokohama to Ōfuna and Odawara. Until 12 March 2021, there were also commuter rapid (Japanese: 通勤快速, romanized: Tsūkin Kaisoku) and Shōnan Liner (Japanese: 湘南ライナー, romanized: Shōnan Rainā) services.

The Ueno–Tokyo Line, a JR East project, extended the services of the Utsunomiya Line, the Takasaki Line, and the Joban Line to Tokyo Station, allowing for through services to and from the Tōkaidō Line from March 2015.

Almost all trains along this section of the line have bi-level "Green Cars" with forward-facing seats, with each set of trains having 2 of them. Green Cars can be used after paying an additional fee.

A new station between Ōfuna and Fujisawa is being planned to serve passengers near the former JR Freight Shōnan Freight Terminal. Construction is expected to start in early 2022. The new station is expected to open for service in 2032.

Legend:

- ● : All trains stop
- ｜ : All trains pass
- ▲ : Shōnan–Shinjuku Line trains use Yokosuka Line platforms

No.	Station	Distance (km)		Local, Rapid Rabbit & Urban	Jōban Line through service	Shōnan–Shinjuku Line		Transfers	Location	
No.	Station	Between Stations	Total	Local, Rapid Rabbit & Urban	Jōban Line through service	Rapid	Special Rapid	Transfers	Location	
Through service from/to:				Ueno-Tokyo Line		Shōnan-Shinjuku Line (for Takasaki Line)				
Through service from/to:				Utsunomiya & Takasaki Line	Jōban Line (Rapid)	Shōnan-Shinjuku Line (for Takasaki Line)				
	Tokyo	-	0	●	●			Tōkaidō Shinkansen; Hokkaido Shinkansen; Tōhoku Shinkansen; Yamagata Shinkansen; Akita Shinkansen; Jōetsu Shinkansen; Hokuriku Shinkansen; Yamanote Line (JY01); Keihin–Tōhoku Line (JK26); Yokosuka Line (JO19); Keiyō Line (JE01); Ueno-Tokyo Line; Chūō Line (JC01); Sōbu Line (Rapid, JO01); Marunouchi Line (M-17); Tōzai Line (Ōtemachi: T-09); Chiyoda Line (Ōtemachi: C-11); Chiyoda Line (Nijubashimae: C-10); Hanzōmon Line (Otemachi: Z-08); Mita Line (Otemachi: I-09)	Chiyoda	Tokyo
	Shimbashi	1.9	1.9	●	●			Yamanote Line; Keihin-Tōhoku Line; Yokosuka Line; Tokyo Metro Ginza Line (G-08); Toei Asakusa Line (A-10); Yurikamome (U-01)	Minato	Tokyo
	Shinagawa	4.7	6.8	●	●			Yamanote Line; Keihin-Tōhoku Line; Yokosuka Line; Tōkaidō Shinkansen; Keikyu Main Line	Minato	Tokyo
	Kawasaki	11.4	18.2	●				Keihin-Tōhoku Line; Nambu Line; Keikyu Main Line; Keikyū Daishi Line	Kawasaki-ku, Kawasaki	Kanagawa
	Yokohama	10.6	28.8	●		▲	▲	Keihin-Tōhoku Line, Negishi Line; Yokohama Line; Shōnan-Shinjuku Line; Yokosuka Line; Tōkyū Tōyoko Line; Keikyu Main Line; Sotetsu Main Line; Yokohama Municipal Subway Blue Line; Minatomirai Line	Nishi-ku, Yokohama	Kanagawa
	Totsuka	12.1	40.9	●		▲	▲	Shōnan-Shinjuku Line; Yokosuka Line; Yokohama Municipal Subway Blue Line	Totsuka-ku, Yokohama	Kanagawa
	Ōfuna	5.6	46.5	●		●	●	Negishi Line (JK01); Yokosuka Line (JO09); Shōnan-Shinjuku Line (JS09); Shonan Monorail (SMR1)	Sakae-ku, Yokohama	Kanagawa
	Ōfuna	5.6	46.5	●		●	●	Negishi Line (JK01); Yokosuka Line (JO09); Shōnan-Shinjuku Line (JS09); Shonan Monorail (SMR1)	Kamakura	Kanagawa
JT08	Fujisawa	4.6	51.1	●		●	●	Odakyū Enoshima Line (OE13); Enoshima Electric Railway (EN01)	Fujisawa	Kanagawa
JT09	Tsujidō	3.7	54.8	●		●	｜		Fujisawa	Kanagawa
JT10	Chigasaki	3.8	58.6	●		●	●	■ Sagami Line	Chigasaki	Kanagawa
JT11	Hiratsuka	5.2	63.8	●		●	●		Hiratsuka	Kanagawa
JT12	Ōiso	4.0	67.8	●		●	｜		Ōiso, Naka District	Kanagawa
JT13	Ninomiya	5.3	73.1	●		●	｜		Ninomiya, Naka District	Kanagawa
JT14	Kōzu	4.6	77.7	●		●	●	Gotemba Line	Odawara	Kanagawa
JT15	Kamonomiya	3.1	80.8	●		●	｜		Odawara	Kanagawa
JT16	Odawara	3.1	83.9	●		●	●	Tōkaidō Shinkansen; Odakyū Odawara Line (OH47); Hakone Tozan Line (OH47); Izu-Hakone Railway Daiyūzan Line (ID01)	Odawara	Kanagawa
JT17	Hayakawa	2.1	86.0	●					Odawara	Kanagawa
JT18	Nebukawa	4.4	90.4	●					Odawara	Kanagawa
JT19	Manazuru	5.4	95.8	●					Manazuru, Ashigarashimo District	Kanagawa
JT20	Yugawara	3.3	99.1	●					Yugawara, Ashigarashimo District	Kanagawa
JT21	Atami	5.5	104.6	●				Itō Line (Some through trains for Ito); Tōkaidō Shinkansen	Atami	Shizuoka
Local: Some operate through service from/to Numazu or Ito

- Some trains run through services beyond Atami, as far as Numazu.
- With the Ueno–Tokyo Line, Utsunomiya Line Rapid Rabbit and Takasaki Line Rapid Urban services now run along the Tōkaidō Line, and stop at all stations on this line. As such, the two services are classified as 'Local' service trains within the Tōkaidō Line.
- Tōkaidō Line Rapid Acty services operate only evening services from Tokyo to Odawara. Rapid Acty services will be discontinued effective the timetable revision on 18 March 2023 after 34 years of operation.
- Shōnan Limited Express services are special, all-reserved commuter express trains with comfortable seating. They operate from Odawara to Tokyo on weekday mornings, with a few services terminating in Shinagawa. Return services run from Tokyo to Odawara on weekday evenings. Like commuter rapid trains, Shōnan Liner services normally make no stops between Shinagawa and Fujisawa. Between Fujisawa and Odawara, varying stops are made. In addition to the standard fare, a reserved seat fee of ¥500 is required to use the Shōnan Liner.
- Keihin-Tōhoku Line stations between Tokyo and Yokohama officially are a part of the Tōkaidō Main Line. These stations are: Yūrakuchō, Hamamatsuchō, Tamachi, Takanawa Gateway, Ōimachi, Ōmori, Kamata, Tsurumi, Shin-Koyasu, and Higashi-Kanagawa.
- Yokosuka Line stations between Tokyo and Ōfuna officially are a part of the Tōkaidō Main Line. These stations are: Nishi-Ōi, Musashi-Kosugi, Shin-Kawasaki, Hodogaya, and Higashi-Totsuka. The route of the Yokosuka Line between Shinagawa and Tsurumi is separate from the main line and is referred to as the Hinkaku Line, on which Nishi-Ōi, Musashi-Kosugi, and Shin-Kawasaki stations are located.
- The Shōnan–Shinjuku Line operates through services to the Tōkaidō Main Line. Trains operate from the Takasaki Line to Ōsaki and enter the Yokosuka Line at Nishi-Ōi to Totsuka then switches tracks to the Tōkaidō Main Line towards Odawara, and vice versa. Rapid Service stop at all stations on the Tōkaidō Main Line (Totsuka - Odawara), while Special Rapid Service operate the same pattern as a Rapid Acty Service.

=== JR Central ===
The point between JR East and JR Central operation is divided at Atami Station. The section of the line between Atami and Maibara is operated by JR Central, and covers the Tōkai region: Shizuoka Prefecture, Aichi Prefecture, and Gifu Prefecture. Some services from Odawara on the JR East section continues to travel on this section until Numazu Station.

==== Shizuoka Block ====
No.	Station	Japanese	Distance (km)		Rapid Services				Home Liner	Transfers	Location	
No.	Station	Japanese	Between Stations	Total (From Tokyo)	Semi Rapid	Rapid	New Rapid	Special Rapid	Home Liner	Transfers	Location	
CA00	Atami	熱海		104.6						Tōkaidō Shinkansen; Itō Line	Atami	Shizuoka
CA01	Kannami	函南	9.9	114.5							Kannami, Tagata District	Shizuoka
CA02	Mishima	三島	6.2	120.7		●				Tōkaidō Shinkansen ■ Izuhakone Railway Sunzu Line (some morning/evening through services)	Mishima	Shizuoka
CA03	Numazu	沼津	5.5	126.2		●			●	Gotemba Line	Numazu	Shizuoka
CA04	Katahama	片浜	4.1	130.3		●			｜		Numazu	Shizuoka
CA05	Hara	原	2.5	132.8		●			｜		Numazu	Shizuoka
CA06	Higashi-Tagonoura	東田子の浦	4.6	137.4		●			｜		Fuji	Shizuoka
CA07	Yoshiwara	吉原	3.9	141.3		●			｜	■ Gakunan Railway Line	Fuji	Shizuoka
CA08	Fuji	富士	4.9	146.2		●			●	Minobu Line	Fuji	Shizuoka
CA09	Fujikawa	富士川	3.5	149.7		｜			｜		Fuji	Shizuoka
CA10	Shin-Kambara	新蒲原	2.8	152.5		｜			｜		Shimizu-ku, Shizuoka	Shizuoka
CA11	Kambara	蒲原	2.4	154.9		｜			｜		Shimizu-ku, Shizuoka	Shizuoka
CA12	Yui	由比	3.5	158.4		｜			｜		Shimizu-ku, Shizuoka	Shizuoka
CA13	Okitsu	興津	5.9	164.3		｜			｜		Shimizu-ku, Shizuoka	Shizuoka
CA14	Shimizu	清水	4.7	169.0		●			●		Shimizu-ku, Shizuoka	Shizuoka
CA15	Kusanagi	草薙	5.2	174.2		｜			｜	Shizuoka Railway Shizuoka-Shimizu Line	Shimizu-ku, Shizuoka	Shizuoka
CA16	Higashi-Shizuoka	東静岡	3.5	177.7		｜			｜		Aoi-ku, Shizuoka	Shizuoka
CA17	Shizuoka	静岡	2.5	180.2		●			●	Tōkaidō Shinkansen; Shizuoka Railway Shizuoka-Shimizu Line (Shin-Shizuoka)	Aoi-ku, Shizuoka	Shizuoka
CA18	Abekawa	安倍川	4.3	184.5					｜		Suruga-ku, Shizuoka	Shizuoka
CA19	Mochimune	用宗	2.1	186.6					｜		Suruga-ku, Shizuoka	Shizuoka
CA20	Yaizu	焼津	7.1	193.7					｜		Yaizu	Shizuoka
CA21	Nishi-Yaizu	西焼津	3.3	197.0					｜		Yaizu	Shizuoka
CA22	Fujieda	藤枝	3.3	200.3					●		Fujieda	Shizuoka
CA23	Rokugō	六合	4.6	204.9					｜		Shimada	Shizuoka
CA24	Shimada	島田	2.9	207.8					●		Shimada	Shizuoka
CA25	Kanaya	金谷	5.1	212.9					｜	Oigawa Railway Oigawa Main Line	Shimada	Shizuoka
CA26	Kikugawa	菊川	9.3	222.2					●		Kikugawa	Shizuoka
CA27	Kakegawa	掛川	7.1	229.3					●	Tōkaidō Shinkansen; Tenryū Hamanako Railroad	Kakegawa	Shizuoka
CA28	Aino	愛野	5.3	234.6					｜		Fukuroi	Shizuoka
CA29	Fukuroi	袋井	3.5	238.1					●		Fukuroi	Shizuoka
CA30	Mikuriya	御厨	4.6	242.7					｜		Iwata	Shizuoka
CA31	Iwata	磐田	3.2	245.9					●		Iwata	Shizuoka
CA32	Toyodachō	豊田町	2.9	248.8					｜		Iwata	Shizuoka
CA33	Tenryūgawa	天竜川	3.9	252.7					｜		Chūō-ku, Hamamatsu	Shizuoka
CA34	Hamamatsu	浜松	4.4	257.1			●	●	●	Tōkaidō Shinkansen; Enshū Railway Line (Shin-Hamamatsu)	Chūō-ku, Hamamatsu	Shizuoka
CA35	Takatsuka	高塚	5.3	262.4			●	●			Chūō-ku, Hamamatsu	Shizuoka
CA36	Maisaka	舞阪	5.1	267.5			●	●			Chūō-ku, Hamamatsu	Shizuoka
CA37	Bentenjima	弁天島	2.3	269.8			●	●			Chūō-ku, Hamamatsu	Shizuoka
CA38	Araimachi	新居町	3.1	272.9			●	●			Kosai	Shizuoka
CA39	Washizu	鷲津	3.7	276.6			●	●			Kosai	Shizuoka
CA40	Shinjohara	新所原	5.8	282.4			●	●		Tenryū Hamanako Railroad	Kosai	Shizuoka
CA41	Futagawa	二川	4.3	286.7			●	●			Toyohashi	Aichi
CA42	Toyohashi	豊橋	6.9	293.6			●	●		Tōkaidō Shinkansen; Iida Line; NH Meitetsu Nagoya Main Line; Toyohashi Railroad Atsumi Line (Shin-Toyohashi), Toyohashi Railroad Azumada Main Line (Ekimae)	Toyohashi	Aichi

==== Nagoya Block Main Line ====
No.	Station	Japanese	Distance (km)		Rapid Services				Home Liner	Transfers	Location	
No.	Station	Japanese	Between Stations	Total (From Tokyo)	Semi Rapid	Rapid	New Rapid	Special Rapid	Home Liner	Transfers	Location	
CA42	Toyohashi	豊橋	6.9	293.6	●	●	●	●	●	Tōkaidō Shinkansen; Iida Line; NH Meitetsu Nagoya Main Line; Toyohashi Railroad Atsumi Line (Shin-Toyohashi), Toyohashi Railroad Azumada Main Line (Ekimae)	Toyohashi	Aichi
CA43	Nishi-Kozakai	西小坂井	4.8	298.4	●	｜	｜	｜	｜		Toyokawa	Aichi
CA44	Aichi-Mito	愛知御津	3.7	302.1	●	｜	｜	｜	｜		Toyokawa	Aichi
CA45	Mikawa-Ōtsuka	三河大塚	3.1	305.2	●	｜	｜	｜	｜		Gamagori	Aichi
CA46	Mikawa-Miya	三河三谷	3.1	308.3	●	▲	▲	｜	｜		Gamagori	Aichi
CA47	Gamagōri	蒲郡	2.3	310.6	●	●	●	●	●	GN Meitetsu Gamagōri Line	Gamagori	Aichi
CA48	Mikawa-Shiotsu	三河塩津	2.3	312.9	●	｜	｜	｜	｜	GN Meitetsu Gamagōri Line (Gamagōri-Kyōteijō-Mae)	Gamagori	Aichi
CA49	Sangane	三ヶ根	2.6	315.5	●	｜	｜	｜	｜		Kōta, Nukata District	Aichi
CA50	Kōda	幸田	3.0	318.5	●	▲	▲	｜	｜		Kōta, Nukata District	Aichi
CA51	Aimi	相見	3.1	321.6	●	｜	｜	｜	｜		Kōta, Nukata District	Aichi
CA52	Okazaki	岡崎	7.4	325.9	●	●	●	●	●	■ Aichi Loop Line	Okazaki	Aichi
CA53	Nishi-Okazaki	西岡崎	4.2	330.1	｜	｜	｜	｜	｜		Okazaki	Aichi
CA54	Anjō	安城	3.6	333.7	●	●	●	●	●		Anjō	Aichi
CA55	Mikawa-Anjō	三河安城	2.6	336.3	●	●	｜	｜	｜	Tōkaidō Shinkansen	Anjō	Aichi
CA56	Higashi-Kariya	東刈谷	1.8	338.1	｜	｜	｜	｜	｜		Kariya	Aichi
CA57	Noda-Shimmachi	野田新町	1.6	339.7	｜	｜	｜	｜	｜		Kariya	Aichi
CA58	Kariya	刈谷	1.9	341.6	●	●	●	●	●	MU Meitetsu Mikawa Line	Kariya	Aichi
CA59	Aizuma	逢妻	1.9	343.5	｜	｜	｜	｜	｜		Kariya	Aichi
CA60	Ōbu	大府	3.0	346.5	●	●	●	｜	●	Taketoyo Line	Ōbu	Aichi
CA61	Kyōwa	共和	3.0	349.5	●	●	｜	｜	｜		Ōbu	Aichi
CA62	Minami-Ōdaka	南大高	2.3	351.8	｜	｜	｜	｜	｜		Midori-ku, Nagoya	Aichi
CA63	Ōdaka	大高	1.8	353.6	｜	｜	｜	｜	｜		Midori-ku, Nagoya	Aichi
CA64	Kasadera	笠寺	3.2	356.8	｜	｜	｜	｜	｜		Minami-ku, Nagoya	Aichi
CA65	Atsuta	熱田	4.0	360.8	｜	｜	｜	｜	｜		Atsuta-ku, Nagoya	Aichi
CA66	Kanayama	金山	1.9	362.7	●	●	●	●	●	Chūō Main Line; NH Meitetsu Nagoya Main Line; Nagoya Municipal Subway: Meijō Line (M01); Meikō Line (E01)	Naka-ku, Nagoya	Aichi
CA67	Otōbashi	尾頭橋	0.9	363.6	｜	｜	｜	｜	｜		Nakagawa-ku, Nagoya	Aichi
CA68	Nagoya	名古屋	2.4	366.0	●	●	●	●	●	Tōkaidō Shinkansen; Kansai Main Line; Chūō Main Line; E Kintetsu Nagoya Line (Kintetsu-Nagoya); NH Meitetsu Nagoya Main Line (Meitetsu-Nagoya); Nagoya Municipal Subway: Higashiyama Line (H08); Sakura-dōri Line (S02); AN Aonami Line (AN01)	Nakamura-ku, Nagoya	Aichi
CA69	Biwajima	枇杷島	4.0	370.0	｜	｜	｜	｜	｜	■ JR-Central Transport Service Jōhoku Line	Kiyosu	Aichi
CA70	Kiyosu	清洲	3.8	373.8	｜	｜	｜	｜	｜		Inazawa	Aichi
CA71	Inazawa	稲沢	3.3	377.1	｜	｜	｜	｜	｜		Inazawa	Aichi
CA72	Owari-Ichinomiya	尾張一宮	6.0	383.1	●	●	●	●	●	NH Meitetsu Nagoya Main Line, BS Meitetsu Bisai Line (Meitetsu-Ichinomiya)	Ichinomiya	Aichi
CA73	Kisogawa	木曽川	3.5	388.6	｜	｜	｜	｜	｜		Ichinomiya	Aichi
CA74	Gifu	岐阜	7.7	396.3	●	●	●	●	●	Takayama Main Line; NH Meitetsu Nagoya Main Line, KG Meitetsu Kagamihara Line (Meitetsu Gifu)	Gifu	Gifu
CA75	Nishi-Gifu	西岐阜	3.2	399.5	●	●	●	●	｜		Gifu	Gifu
CA76	Hozumi	穂積	1.0	400.5	●	●	●	●	●		Mizuho	Gifu
CA77	Ōgaki	大垣	9.5	410.0	●	●	●	●	●	Tōkaidō Main Line (Mino-Akasaka, Shin-Tarui branch lines) ■ Yōrō Railway Yōrō Line ■ Tarumi Railway Tarumi Line	Ōgaki	Gifu
CA78	Tarui	垂井	8.1	418.1	●	●	●	●	●		Tarui, Fuwa District	Gifu
CA79	Sekigahara	関ヶ原	5.7	423.8	●	●	●	●	●	Tōkaidō Main Line (Shin-Tarui branch line)	Sekigahara, Fuwa District	Gifu
CA80	Kashiwabara	柏原	7.1	430.9	●	●	●	●			Maibara	Shiga
CA81	Ōmi-Nagaoka	近江長岡	4.3	435.2	●	●	●	●			Maibara	Shiga
CA82	Samegai	醒ヶ井	4.6	439.8	●	●	●	●			Maibara	Shiga
CA83	Maibara *	米原	6.1	445.9	●	●	●	●		Tōkaidō Shinkansen; Hokuriku Main Line; Biwako Line (Tōkaidō Main Line) ■ Ohmi Railway Main Line	Maibara	Shiga

Maibara is shared by JR Central and JR West; JR West manages the station

Before March 2016, JR West operated trains from Maibara as far as Ogaki on JR Central territory. From 25 March 2016, all JR West departures were changed to JR Central trains to Maibara station.

==== Branch lines ====
Track diagram around Minami-arao Junction

Track diagram between Ōgaki and Sekigahara

Both the Mino-Akasaka and Tarui branch lines separate from the Main Line at Minami-Arao Junction, located 3.1 km west of Ōgaki Station.

===== Mino-Akasaka Branch Line =====
Station	Japanese	Distance (km)		Transfers	Location	
Station	Japanese	Between Stations	Total (from Ōgaki)	Transfers	Location	
Ōgaki	大垣	-	0.0	Tōkaidō Main Line	Ōgaki	Gifu
Arao	荒尾	3.4	3.4		Ōgaki	Gifu
Mino-Akasaka	美濃赤坂	1.6	5.0		Ōgaki	Gifu

All trains on the Mino-Akasaka Branch Line operate as a shuttle service between Ogaki and Mino-Akasaka. Services operate approximately every 45 minutes during morning and evening peak hours, but there are large gaps between services of 2-3 hours during the day. Running time is 7 minutes.

===== Tarui Branch Line =====
Between Ōgaki and Sekigahara, there is a 25 per mil grade. In 1944, a single track bypass (in orange on the diagram) was built to avoid this steep slope of the main line. The old section, informally referred to as the "Shin-Tarui Line", remains largely unused, and Shin-Tarui Station was closed in 1986. Today, the only rail vehicles that travel on this section of track are freight trains and westbound express trains (the Shirasagi, Hida #36, and Sunrise Seto/Izumo services).

Station	Japanese	Distance (km)		Transfers	Location	
Station	Japanese	Between Stations	Total (from Ōgaki)	Transfers	Location	
Ōgaki	大垣	-	0.0	Tōkaidō Main Line	Ōgaki	Gifu
Tarui	垂井	8.1	8.1		Tarui, Fuwa District	Gifu
Sekigahara	関ヶ原	5.7	13.8	JR Central: Tōkaidō Main Line	Sekigahara	Gifu

=== JR West ===
The western part of the Tōkaidō Main Line from Maibara to Kōbe is operated by JR West and forms the main trunk of the company's Urban Network in the Osaka-Kobe-Kyoto metropolitan area. Although the line is divided into three segments, known as the Biwako Line, JR Kyoto Line, and JR Kobe Line, they are part of a single contiguous network, with many services traversing multiple sections. The Biwako Line includes a segment of the Hokuriku Main Line. Some services on the Kosei, JR Takarazuka and Gakkentoshi lines run through onto the Tōkaidō Main Line.

==== Biwako Line ====
The section between Maibara and Kyoto is known as the Biwako Line.

- ●: Trains stop.
- ○: Limited stop, early morning and late night only
- |: Trains pass.
- Local (4-door Commuter trains): JR Kyoto Line local trains
- Local (3-door Suburban trains): Operate as Rapid service trains west of Takatsuki (west of Kyoto in the morning)

Official line name	No.	Station	Japanese	Distance (km)		Stop			Transfers	Location	
Official line name	No.	Station	Japanese	Between Stations	Total (from Tokyo)	Local (Commuter)	Local (Suburban)	Special Rapid	Transfers	Ward, City	Prefecture
Through service from/to Hokuriku Main Line
Tōkaidō Main Line	A12	Maibara	米原	-	445.9		●	●	Hokuriku Main Line for Ōmi-Shiotsu and Tsuruga JR Central: Tōkaidō Shinkansen; Tōkaidō Line for Gifu and Nagoya (CA83); ■ Ohmi Railway Main Line	Maibara	Shiga
Tōkaidō Main Line	A13	Hikone	彦根	6.0	451.9		●	●	■ Ohmi Railway Main Line	Hikone	Shiga
Tōkaidō Main Line	A14	Minami-Hikone	南彦根	3.3	455.2		●	|		Hikone	Shiga
Tōkaidō Main Line	A15	Kawase	河瀬	3.1	458.3		●	|		Hikone	Shiga
Tōkaidō Main Line	A16	Inae	稲枝	3.7	462.0		●	|		Hikone	Shiga
Tōkaidō Main Line	A17	Notogawa	能登川	3.7	465.7		●	●		Higashiōmi	Shiga
Tōkaidō Main Line	A18	Azuchi	安土	5.1	470.8		●	|		Ōmihachiman	Shiga
Tōkaidō Main Line	A19	Ōmi-Hachiman	近江八幡	3.5	474.3		●	●	■ Ohmi Railway Yōkaichi Line	Ōmihachiman	Shiga
Tōkaidō Main Line	A20	Shinohara	篠原	4.0	478.3		●	|		Ōmihachiman	Shiga
Tōkaidō Main Line	A21	Yasu	野洲	5.6	483.9	○	●	●		Yasu	Shiga
Tōkaidō Main Line	A22	Moriyama	守山	3.1	487.0	○	●	●		Moriyama	Shiga
Tōkaidō Main Line	A23	Rittō	栗東	2.1	489.1	○	●	|		Rittō	Shiga
Tōkaidō Main Line	A24	Kusatsu	草津	2.3	491.4	●	●	●	Kusatsu Line	Kusatsu	Shiga
Tōkaidō Main Line	A25	Minami-Kusatsu	南草津	2.5	493.9	●	●	●		Kusatsu	Shiga
Tōkaidō Main Line	A26	Seta	瀬田	2.7	496.6	●	●	|		Ōtsu	Shiga
Tōkaidō Main Line	A27	Ishiyama	石山	2.5	499.1	●	●	●	Keihan Ishiyama Sakamoto Line (OT03: Keihan Ishiyama Station)	Ōtsu	Shiga
Tōkaidō Main Line	A28	Zeze	膳所	2.8	501.9	●	●	|	Keihan Ishiyama Sakamoto Line (OT09: Keihan Zeze Station)	Ōtsu	Shiga
Tōkaidō Main Line	A29	Ōtsu	大津	1.7	503.6	●	●	●		Ōtsu	Shiga
Tōkaidō Main Line	A30	Yamashina	山科	4.5	508.1	●	●	●	Kosei Line (JR-B30); Kyoto Municipal Subway Tōzai Line (T07); Keihan Keishin Line (OT31: Keihan Yamashina Station)	Yamashina-ku, Kyoto	Kyoto
Tōkaidō Main Line	A31	Kyoto	京都	5.5	513.6	●	●	●	Tōkaidō Shinkansen; JR Kyoto Line; Nara Line (JR-D01); Sagano Line (Sanin Main Line) (JR-E01); Kintetsu Kyoto Line (B01); Kyoto Municipal Subway Karasuma Line (K11)	Shimogyo-ku, Kyoto	Kyoto
Through service from/to JR Kyoto Line
Within JR Kyoto Line:						Local (Northbound only)	Rapid	Special Rapid			

==== JR Kyoto Line ====
The section between Kyoto and Osaka is known as the JR Kyoto Line. Trains from the Biwako and Kosei lines travel through onto the JR Kyoto Line and continue west towards the JR Kobe Line at Osaka.

Legend:

- ● : All trains stop
- | : All trains pass
- ▲ : Trains only after morning rush stop

Local trains stop at all stations. Rapid trains in the morning skip some stops between Kyoto and Takatsuki.

Official Line Name	No.	Station	Japanese	Distance (km)	Stops		Transfers	Location	
Official Line Name	No.	Station	Japanese	Distance (km)	Rapid	Special Rapid	Transfers	Ward, City	Prefecture
Through services from Biwako Line and Kosei Line
Tōkaidō Main Line	A31	Kyoto	京都	0.0	●	●	Tōkaidō Shinkansen; Biwako Line; Kosei Line ( B31 ) Nara Line ( D01 ) Sagano Line ( E01 ) Kintetsu Kyoto Line (B01); Kyoto Municipal Subway Karasuma Line (K11)	Shimogyō-ku, Kyoto	Kyoto
Tōkaidō Main Line	A32	Nishiōji	西大路	2.5	▲	|		Minami-ku, Kyoto	Kyoto
Tōkaidō Main Line	A33	Katsuragawa	桂川 (久世)	5.3	▲	|		Minami-ku, Kyoto	Kyoto
Tōkaidō Main Line	A34	Mukōmachi	向日町	6.4	▲	|		Mukō	Kyoto
Tōkaidō Main Line	A35	Nagaokakyō	長岡京	10.1	●	|		Nagaokakyō	Kyoto
Tōkaidō Main Line	A36	Yamazaki	山崎	14.1	▲	|		Ōyamazaki	Kyoto
Tōkaidō Main Line	A37	Shimamoto	島本	16.3	▲	|		Shimamoto	Osaka
Tōkaidō Main Line	A38	Takatsuki	高槻	21.6	●	●		Takatsuki	Osaka
Tōkaidō Main Line	A39	Settsu-Tonda	摂津富田	24.5	|	|		Takatsuki	Osaka
Tōkaidō Main Line	A40	JR-Sōjiji	JR総持寺	26.2	|	|		Ibaraki	Osaka
Tōkaidō Main Line	A41	Ibaraki	茨木	28.2	●	|		Ibaraki	Osaka
Tōkaidō Main Line	A42	Senrioka	千里丘	31.1	|	|		Settsu	Osaka
Tōkaidō Main Line	A43	Kishibe	岸辺	32.8	|	|		Suita	Osaka
Tōkaidō Main Line	A44	Suita	吹田	35.2	|	|		Suita	Osaka
Tōkaidō Main Line	A45	Higashi-Yodogawa	東淀川	38.3	|	|		Yodogawa-ku, Osaka	Osaka
Tōkaidō Main Line	A46	Shin-Ōsaka	新大阪	39.0	●	●	Tōkaidō Shinkansen; San'yō Shinkansen; Osaka Higashi Line ( F02 ) Osaka Metro Midōsuji Line (M13)	Yodogawa-ku, Osaka	Osaka
Tōkaidō Main Line	A47	Ōsaka	大阪	42.8	●	●	JR Kōbe Line; JR Takarazuka Line ( G47 ) Osaka Loop Line ( O11 ) Osaka Higashi Line ( F01 ) JR Tōzai Line ( H44 :Kitashinchi Station); Hankyū Kōbe Main Line, Hankyu Takarazuka Main Line, Hankyu Kyoto Main Line (HK-01:Osaka-umeda Station); Hanshin Main Line (HS 01:Osaka-Umeda Station); Osaka Metro: Midōsuji Line (M16: Umeda Station); Tanimachi Line (T20: Higashi-Umeda Station); Yotsubashi Line (Y11: Nishi-Umeda Station)	Kita-ku, Osaka	Osaka
Through services on JR Kobe Line Through services on JR Takarazuka Line (Local only)

==== JR Kobe Line ====
The westernmost section between Osaka and Kōbe is part of the JR Kobe Line, which continues west to Himeji on the San'yō Main Line. Although Kōbe is the official terminus of the Tōkaidō Main Line, most trains continue to Nishi-Akashi, Himeji and beyond.

●: Trains stop at all times
｜: Trains pass at all times

Official line name	No.	Station	Japanese	Distance (km)		Stop			Transfers	Location	
Official line name	No.	Station	Japanese	Between stations	from Osaka	Local	Rapid	Special Rapid	Transfers	Ward, City	Prefecture
Through service to/from the JR Kyoto Line
Tōkaidō Main Line	A47	Osaka	大阪	-	0.0	●	●	●	JR Kyoto Line (Tōkaidō Main Line); JR Takarazuka Line (JR-G47); Osaka Loop Line (JR-O11); Osaka Higashi Line (JR-F01); JR Tōzai Line (JR-H44:Kitashinchi Station); Hankyu Kobe Main Line, Hankyu Takarazuka Main Line, Hankyu Kyoto Main Line (HK-01:Osaka-umeda Station); Hanshin Main Line (HS 01:Osaka-Umeda Station); Osaka Metro: Midōsuji Line (M16: Umeda Station); Tanimachi Line (T20: Higashi-Umeda Station); Yotsubashi Line (Y11: Nishi-Umeda Station)	Kita-ku, Osaka	Osaka
Tōkaidō Main Line	A48	Tsukamoto	塚本	3.4	3.4	●	|	|		Yodogawa-ku, Osaka	Osaka
Tōkaidō Main Line	A49	Amagasaki	尼崎	4.3	7.7	●	●	●	JR Takarazuka Line (Fukuchiyama Line) (JR-G49); JR Tōzai Line (JR-H49)	Amagasaki	Hyōgo
Tōkaidō Main Line	A50	Tachibana	立花	3.0	10.7	●	|	|		Amagasaki	Hyōgo
Tōkaidō Main Line	A51	Kōshienguchi	甲子園口	2.2	12.9	●	|	|		Nishinomiya	Hyōgo
Tōkaidō Main Line	A52	Nishinomiya	西宮	2.5	15.4	●	●	|		Nishinomiya	Hyōgo
Tōkaidō Main Line	A53	Sakura Shukugawa	さくら夙川	1.5	16.9	●	|	|		Nishinomiya	Hyōgo
Tōkaidō Main Line	A54	Ashiya	芦屋	2.3	19.2	●	●	●		Ashiya	Hyōgo
Tōkaidō Main Line	A55	Kōnan-Yamate	甲南山手	1.4	20.6	●	|	|		Higashinada-ku, Kobe	Hyōgo
Tōkaidō Main Line	A56	Settsu-Motoyama	摂津本山	1.5	22.1	●	|	|		Higashinada-ku, Kobe	Hyōgo
Tōkaidō Main Line	A57	Sumiyoshi	住吉	1.6	23.6	●	●	|	Kobe New Transit Rokko Island Line (R01)	Higashinada-ku, Kobe	Hyōgo
Tōkaidō Main Line	A58	Rokkōmichi	六甲道	2.2	25.9	●	●	|		Nada-ku, Kobe	Hyōgo
Tōkaidō Main Line	A59	Maya	摩耶	1.4	27.3	●	|	|		Nada-ku, Kobe	Hyōgo
Tōkaidō Main Line	A60	Nada	灘	0.9	28.2	●	|	|		Nada-ku, Kobe	Hyōgo
Tōkaidō Main Line	A61	Sannomiya	三ノ宮	2.4	30.6	●	●	●	Hankyu Kobe Line, Kobe Kosoku Line (HK-16: Kobe Sannomiya Station); Hanshin Main Line (HS 32: Kobe Sannomiya Station); Kobe New Transit Port Island Line (P01); Kobe Municipal Subway Seishin-Yamate Line (S03: Sannomiya Station); Kobe Municipal Subway Kaigan Line (K01: Sannomiya-Hanadokeimae Station)	Chuo-ku, Kobe	Hyōgo
Tōkaidō Main Line	A62	Motomachi	元町	0.8	31.4	●	●	|	Hanshin Main Line, Kobe Kosoku Line (HS 33)	Chuo-ku, Kobe	Hyōgo
Tōkaidō Main Line	A63	Kobe	神戸	1.7	33.1	●	●	●	Hanshin Kobe Kosoku Line, Hankyu Kobe Kosoku Line (HS 35: Kōsoku Kōbe Station); Kobe Municipal Subway Kaigan Line (K04: Harborland Station)	Chuo-ku, Kobe	Hyōgo
Through service to/from the San'yō Main Line and the Ako Line

=== Former connecting lines ===
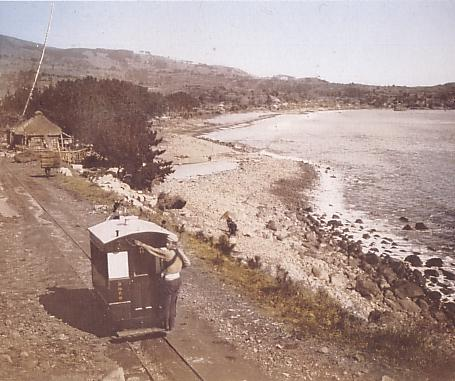
The handcar line near Yoshihama (see Atami Station)

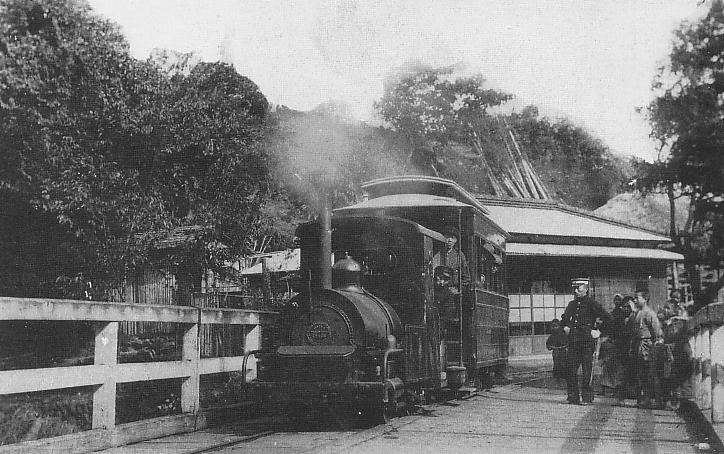
The Yoshihama line after conversion to steam power, circa 1920

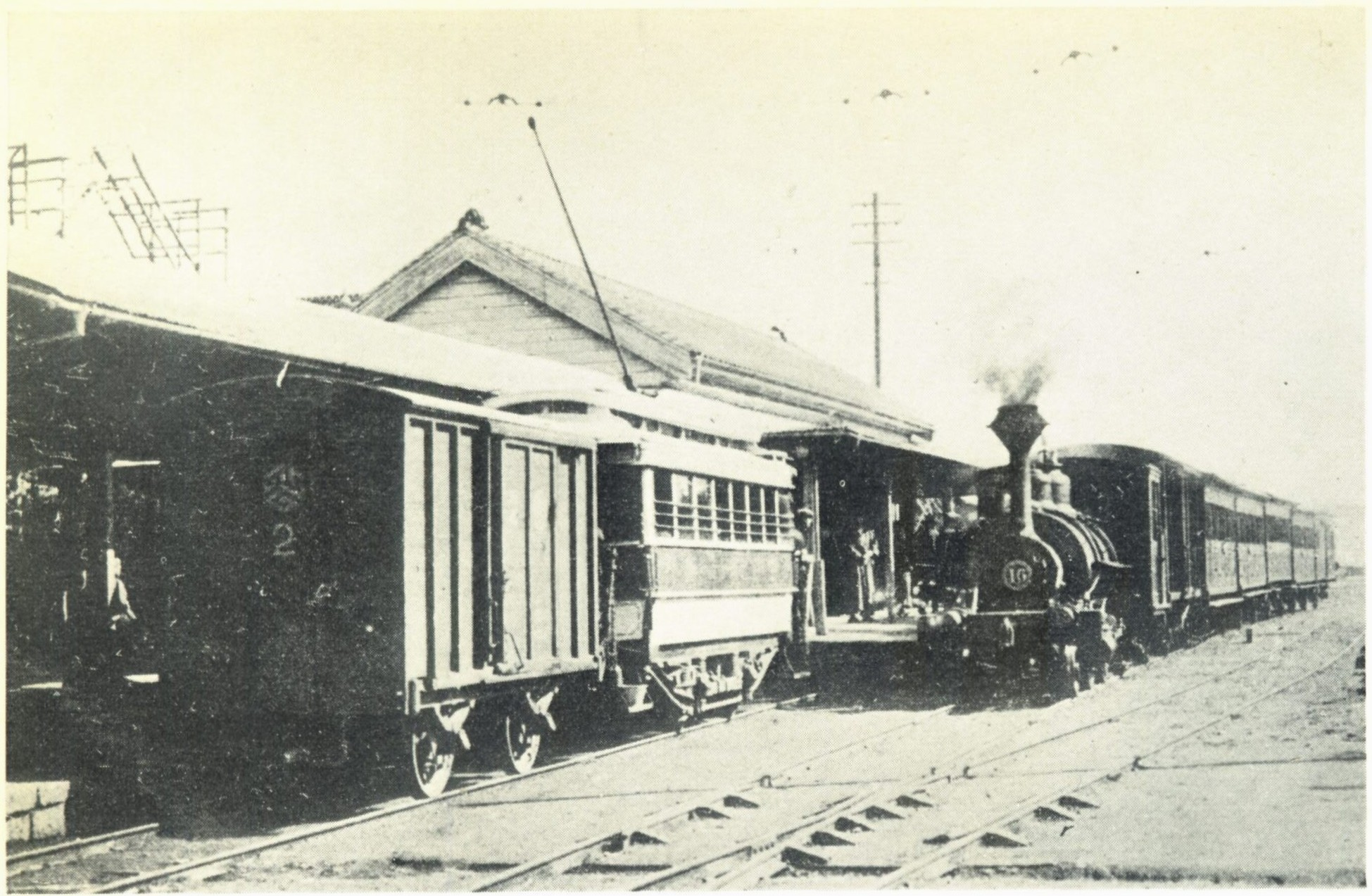
Mishima-Tamachi Station circa 1914 (see Numazu Station)

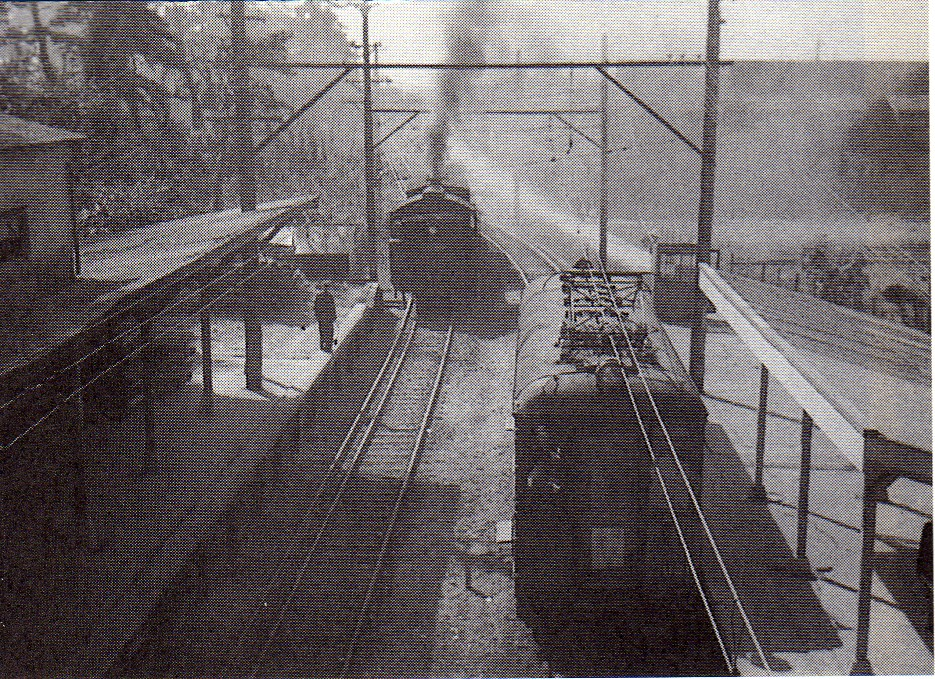
Mukogawa Station in 1944, note the dual-gauge track (see Nishinomiya Station)

==== Kanagawa Prefecture ====
- Ninomiya Station: The Shonan Horse-drawn Tramway opened a 10 km (6.2 mi) line to Hatano in 1906 to haul tobacco. Steam locomotion was introduced in 1913. Passenger services ceased in 1933, and the line closed in 1935.
- Odawara Station: The Japan Tobacco and Salt Public Corporation operated an approximately 1 km line to its factory, electrified at 1,500 V DC, between 1950 and 1984. The line was also serviced by the adjoining Odakyu Odawara Line from its Ashigara station.

==== Shizuoka Prefecture ====
- Atami Station: In 1895, a 10 km (6.2 mi) 610 mm (2 ft) gauge handcar line opened to Yoshihama, and was extended 4 km (2.5 mi) to Odawara the following year. In 1907, the line was converted to 762 mm (2 ft 6 in) gauge and steam locomotives were introduced. The line closed in 1923 as a result of the Great Kanto earthquake.
- Numazu Station: The Sunzu Electric Railway opened a 7 km (4.3 mi) line to Mishima-Tamachi on the Izuhakone Railway Sunzu Line in 1906. In 1915, the line was truncated 1 km to connect at Mishima-Hirokoji, and the line was electrified at 600 V DC in 1919. The line closed in 1961 following the destruction of the Kisegawa bridge during a flood.
- Yoshiwara Station: The Fuji Horse Tramway (富士馬車鉄道, Fuji Basha Tetsudō) opened a 610 mm (2 ft) gauge line to Ōmiya (presentday Fujinomiya) in 1890. The Fuji Minobu Railway (富士身延鉄道, Fuji Minobu Tetsudō) purchased the tramway in 1912, converted it to a 1,067 mm (3 ft 6 in) gauge steam railway the following year and gradually extended it (eventually becoming the Minobu Line). In 1924, the company built a new alignment which connected to Fuji station on the Tōkaidō Main Line, at which time the original section from Omiya to Yoshiwara closed.
- Shimizu Station: Shimizukō Line from 1916 to 1984.
- Shizuoka Station:
  - The Abe Railway opened a 9 km (5.6 mi) 762 mm (2 ft 6 in) gauge line from Inomiya (approximately 2 km from Shizuoka) to Ushizuma in 1914 to haul timber. Plans to extend the line to Shizuoka did not eventuate and the line closed in 1934.
  - The Shizuoka Electric Railway opened a 2 km (1.2 mi) line to Anzai, connecting to its Shimizu Line, electrified at 600 V DC, between 1922 and 1926. The line closed in 1962.
- Yaizu Station: A 5 km (3.1 mi) 610 mm (2 ft) handcar line operated to Fujieda between 1891 and 1900.
- Fujieda Station: The Tōsō Railway opened a 4 km (2.5 mi) 762 mm (2 ft 6 in) gauge line to Ote in 1913, and by 1926 had extended the line progressively in both directions for a length of 38 km (24 mi) from Jitogata to Suruga-Okabe, although in 1936 the 5 km (3.1 mi) section from Suruga-Okabe to Ote was closed. In 1943, the company merged with the Shizuoka Railway (see Fujiroi Station below), and in 1948, a 7 km (4.3 mi) line between Mitsumata and Jitogata opened, linking the two sections. This section of the combined line closed between 1964 and 1970.
- Shimada Station: The Fuji Prefectural Government opened a 3 km (1.9 mi) 610 mm (2 ft) gauge handcar line in 1898 to haul timber. In 1944, following the destruction of the nearby Tōkaidō Line bridge over the Oigawa, it was proposed to use the alignment of this line as a replacement, including a 930 m (3,050 ft) wooden bridge over the river. The bridge was about 25% completed when the end of the war resulted in the termination of the proposal. A diesel locomotive was introduced in 1955 to haul construction material for the construction of the adjacent national highway, and the line closed in 1959.
- Kikukawa Station: The Joto horse-drawn tramway opened a 15 km (9.3 mi) 2 ft (610 mm) gauge line to Ikeshinden in 1899. In 1923, the line was converted to 762 mm (2 ft 6 in) gauge, and a single-cylinder diesel locomotive introduced. The line closed in 1935.
- Fukuroi Station:
  - The Akiba horse-drawn tramway opened a 12 km (7.5 mi) 762 mm (2 ft 6 in) gauge line to Enshumori-Cho in 1902. In 1926, the company renamed itself the Shizuoka Electric Railway, converted the line to 1,067 mm (3 ft 6 in) gauge and electrified it at 600 V DC. The line closed in 1962.
  - The Shizuoka Railway opened a 10 km (6.2 mi) 762 mm (2 ft 6 in) gauge line to Yokosuka in 1914, extending it 7 km (4.3 mi) to Mitsumata in 1927. The company merged with the Fuji-sho Railway in 1943 (see Fujieda Station above), and in 1948, a 7 km (4.3 mi) line between Mitsumata and Jitogata opened, linking the two sections. This section of the combined line closed between 1964 and 1967.
- Hamamatsu Station: The Dainippon Railway opened a 7 km (4.3 mi), 762 mm (2 ft 6 in) gauge line to Kuniyoshi in 1909. In 1919, the line was acquired by the Enshu Railway Line, which closed the first 1 km (0.62 mi) of the line in 1925, so the new connecting station became Enshu-Magome. The line closed in 1937 while the section to Enshu-Magome would close in 1985.

==== Aichi Prefecture ====
- Okazaki Station:
  - The Nishio Railway opened a 762 mm (2 ft 6 in) gauge line to Nishio in 1911, and extended it to Kira-Yoshida on the Meitetsu Gamagōri Line between 1915 and 1916. In 1926, the company merged with the Aichi Electric Railway, which between 1928 and 1929 converted the line to 1,067 mm (3 ft 6 in) gauge, electrified it at 600 V DC, and connected it to the line from Shin-Anjō on the Meitetsu Nagoya Main Line at Nishioguchi. The line to Nishio closed in 1962.
  - A 6 km (3.7 mi) tram line connected to the Meitetsu Koromo line at Okazaki-Ida Station, which between 1929 and 1962 connected to the Meitetsu Mikawa Line at Uwagoromo, the tramway also closing in 1962.
- Owari-Ichinomiya Station: The 6 km (3.7 mi) Meitetsu line to Okoshi, electrified at 600 V DC, opened in 1924. When the voltage on the Meitetsu main line was increased to 1,500 V DC in 1952, services were suspended on this line. The substitute bus service proved so popular the line was closed rather than upgraded.

==== Gifu Prefecture ====
- Ogaki Station: The Seino Railway opened a 3 km (1.9 mi) line from Mino-Akasaka to Ichihashi in 1928, and operated a passenger service from 1930 to 1945.
- Arao Station (on the Mino Akasaka branch): A 2 km (1.2 mi) freight-only line to the Mino Okubo limestone quarry operated between 1928 and 1990.

==== Hyōgo Prefecture ====
- Nishinomiya Station: A 2 km (1.2 mi) freight-only line was opened in 1944 to connect to Mukogawa Station on the Hanshin Main Line. As the former was 1,067 mm (3 ft 6 in) gauge, and the latter 1,435 mm (4 ft 8 1/2 in) gauge, some tracks at Mukogawa were dual gauge. Service on the line ceased in 1958, but it was not formally closed until 1970.
- Rokkomichi Station: A 6 km (3.7 mi) line to Kobe Port opened in 1907, electrified at 1,500 V DC. Passenger services ceased in 1974, and the line closed in 2003.

== Limited express services ==
In addition to standard local, rapid, and special rapid service trains, the Tōkaidō Main Line also hosts a number of limited express services.

=== Daytime trains ===
- Biwako Express: Maibara – Osaka
- Fujikawa: Shizuoka – Fuji – (Minobu Line) – Kōfu
- Haruka: Yasu - Kyoto – Shin-Osaka – (Osaka Loop Line) – Tennōji – (Hanwa Line) – Hineno – (Kansai Airport Line) – Kansai International Airport
- Hida: Nagoya / Osaka – Gifu – (Takayama Main Line) – Toyama
- Odoriko: Tokyo – Atami – (Itō Line) – Itō – (Izu Kyūkō) – Shimoda; Tokyo – Mishima – (Izuhakone Railway Sunzu Line) – Shuzenji
- Thunderbird: Osaka – Kyoto – (Kosei Line) – Tsuruga
- Saphir Odoriko: Tokyo – Atami – (Itō Line) – Itō – (Izu Kyūkō) – Izukyu-Shimoda
- Shirasagi: Nagoya – Maibara – (Hokuriku Main Line) – Tsuruga
- Shōnan: Tokyo – Odawara

=== Overnight trains ===
Overnight trains on the Tōkaidō Line go from Tokyo to western Honshū and Shikoku.

- Sunrise Izumo (Tokyo – Izumo via Okayama) (Operates daily)
- Sunrise Seto (Tokyo – Takamatsu) (Operates daily)

=== Discontinued trains ===
- Overnight limited express Sakura (Tokyo – Nagasaki (discontinued March 2005), Tokyo – Sasebo (discontinued 1999))
- Overnight limited express Izumo (Tokyo – Izumo via Tottori), discontinued March 2006
- Limited express Wide View Tōkai (Tokyo – Shizuoka), discontinued March 2007
- Overnight express Ginga (Tokyo – Osaka), discontinued March 2008
- Overnight limited express Fuji (Tokyo – Ōita), discontinued March 2009
- Overnight limited express Hayabusa (Tokyo – Kumamoto), discontinued March 2009
- Overnight limited express Sunrise Yume (Tokyo – Hiroshima), discontinued March 2009
- Moonlight Nagara (Tokyo – Ōgaki) (Operates seasonally - rapid service with reserved seats), discontinued March 2020
- Super View Odoriko, Resort Odoriko, Fleur Odoriko (Tokyo – Izukyu-Shimoda), discontinued March 2020

== Rolling stock for local and rapid services ==
=== JR East ===
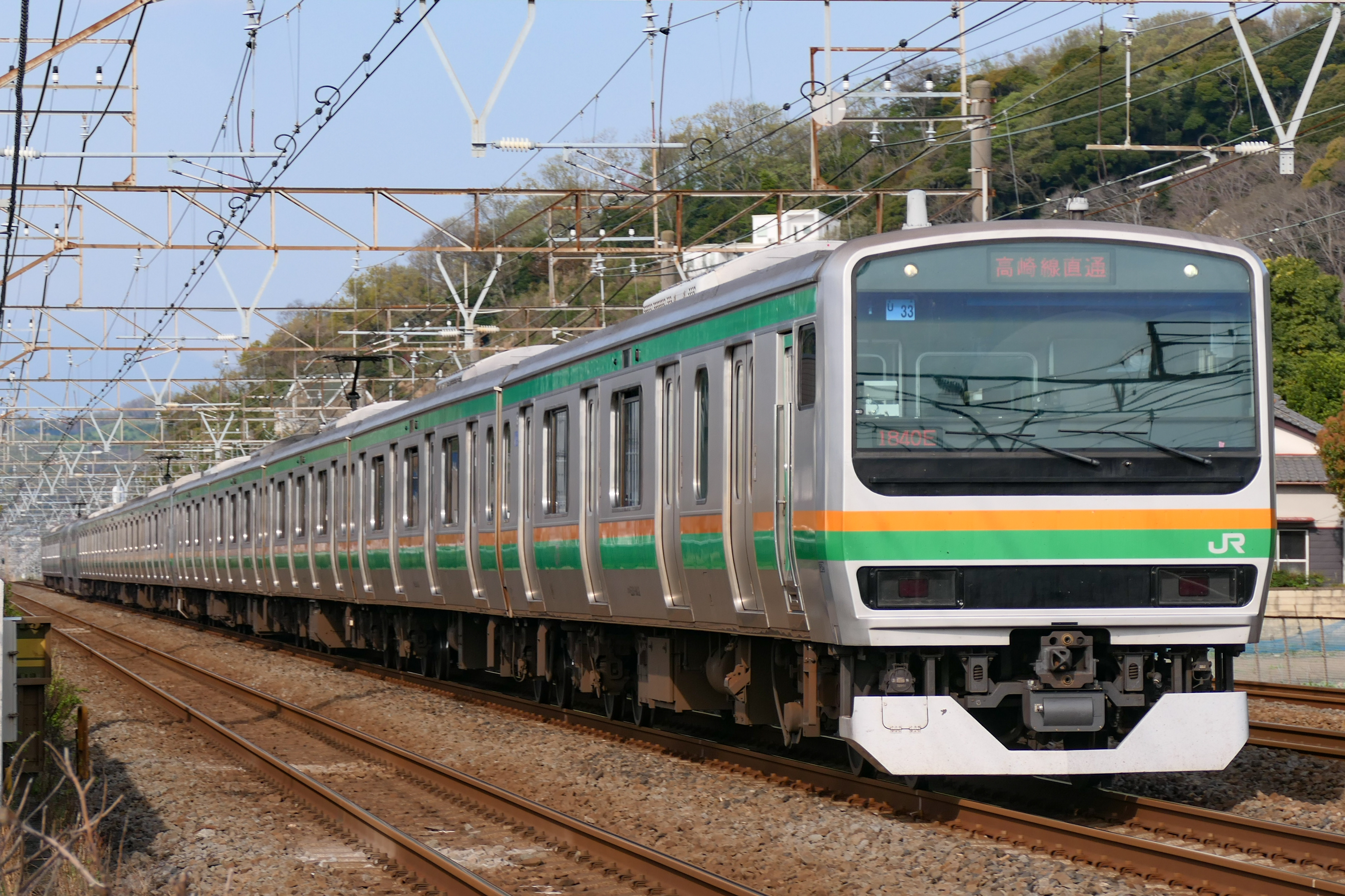
JR East E231-1000 series

- E231-1000 series (Tokyo – Atami – Numazu, through services onto the Itō Line)
- E233-3000 series (Tokyo – Atami – Numazu, through services onto the Itō Line)
- E257-2000/2500 series (Odoriko, Shōnan: Ikebukuro/Tokyo – Atami, through service onto the Itō Line)
- E261 series (Saphir Odoriko: Shinjuku/Tokyo – Atami, through service onto the Itō Line)

=== JR Central ===
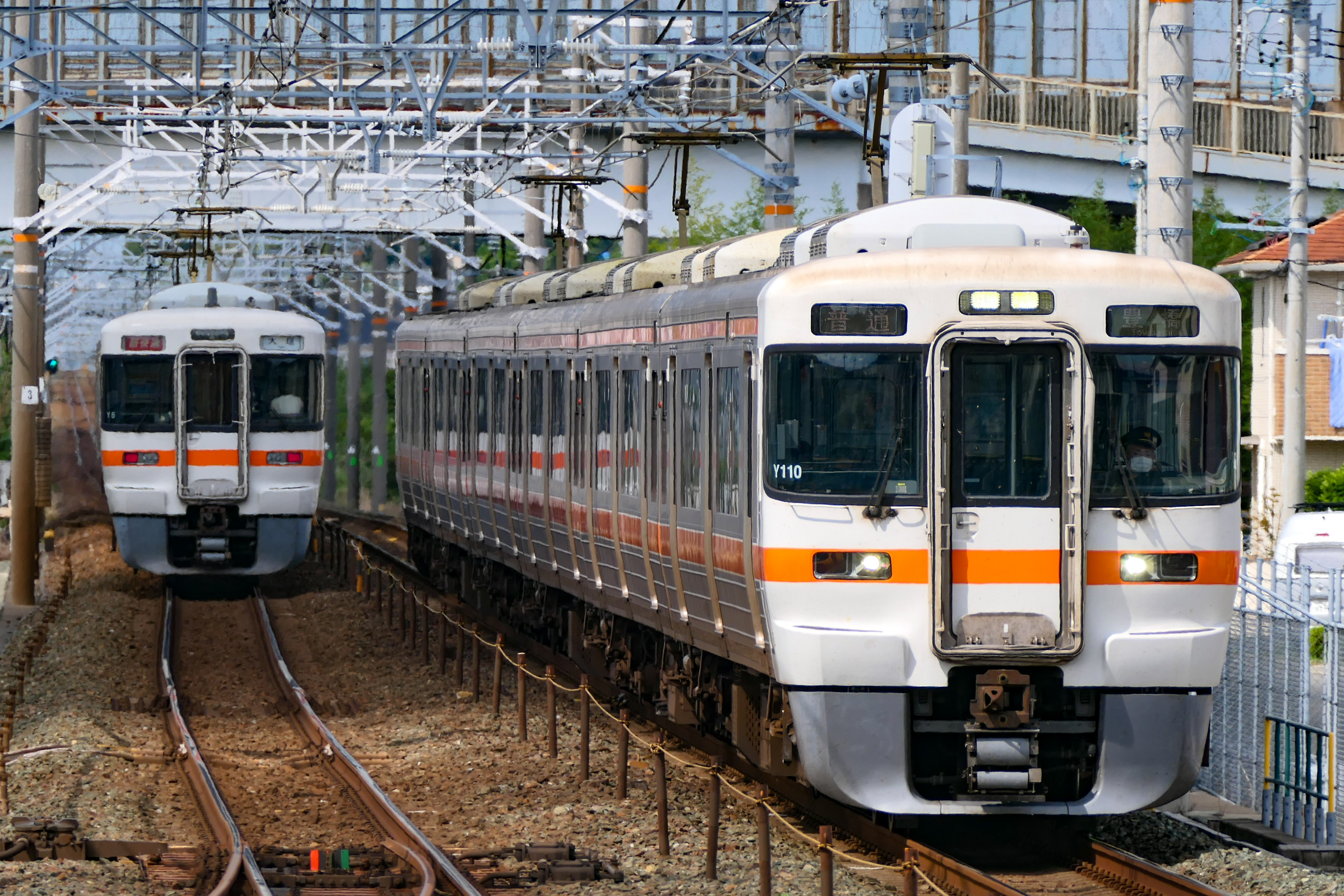
JR Central 313 series

- 211-5000 series (Atami – Toyohashi, through services onto the Gotemba Line)
- 211-6000 series (Atami – Toyohashi, through services onto the Gotemba Line, through services onto the Minobu Line)
- 313-0 series (Hamamatsu – Toyohashi – Gifu – Ōgaki)
- 313-300 series (Hamamatsu – Toyohashi – Gifu – Ōgaki, Ōgaki – Mino-Akasaka)
- 313-2300 series (Atami – Toyohashi, through services onto the Gotemba Line, through services onto the Minobu Line)
- 313-2500 series (Atami – Toyohashi, through services onto the Gotemba Line, through services onto the Minobu Line)
- 313-2600 series (Atami – Toyohashi, through services onto the Gotemba Line, through services onto the Minobu Line)
- 313-3000 series (through services onto the Gotemba Line, through services onto the Minobu Line)
- 313-3100 series (through services onto the Gotemba Line, through services onto the Minobu Line)
- 313-5000 series (Hamamatsu – Toyohashi – Gifu – Ōgaki – Maibara)
- 373 series (Atami – Shizuoka, Hamamatsu – Toyohashi, Ōgaki – Maibara)
- HC85 series (Nagoya / Osaka – Gifu, through service on the Takayama Main Line)

=== JR West ===
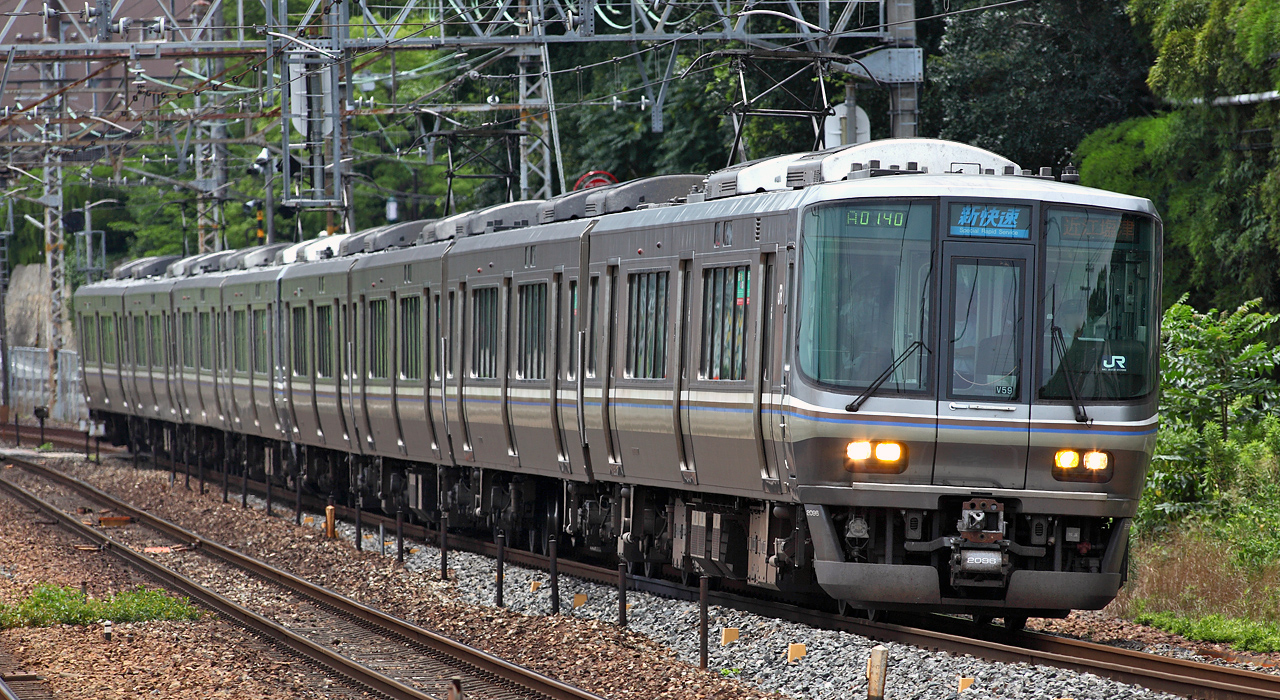
JR West 223-2000 series

- 681 series (Nagoya – Ōgaki – Sekigahara)
- 683-8000 series (Nagoya – Ōgaki – Sekigahara)
- 271 series (Yasu – Shin-Osaka)
- 281 series (Yasu – Shin-Osaka)
- 207 series (Kusatsu – Kobe)
- 321 series (Kusatsu – Kobe)
- 221 series (Maibara – Kobe)
- 223 series (Maibara – Kobe)
- 225 series (Maibara – Kobe)

=== Former rolling stock ===
- KiHa 75 (through services onto the Taketoyo Line, 1999 - March 2015)
- KiHa 85 series (Nagoya / Osaka – Gifu, through service on the Takayama Main Line, 1989 – 9 July 2023)
- 113-1000 series (April 1972 - March 2006)
- 185 series (Tokyo – Atami, Misima through services onto the Itō Line, March 1981 - March 2021)
- 211 series (Tokyo – Atami – Numazu, through services onto the Itō Line, 1985 - April 2012)
- 215 series (Tokyo – Atami, 1992 - March 2021)
- E217 series (Tokyo – Atami, March 2006 - March 2015)
- 251 series (Ikebukuro/Tokyo, Atami, through service onto the Itō Line, April 1990 - March 2020)
- 311 series (Shizuoka – Kakegawa – Hamamatsu – Toyohashi – Gifu, until 2025)
- 651 series (Izu Craile services: Odawara – Atami, through service onto the Itō Line, July 2016 - June 2020)
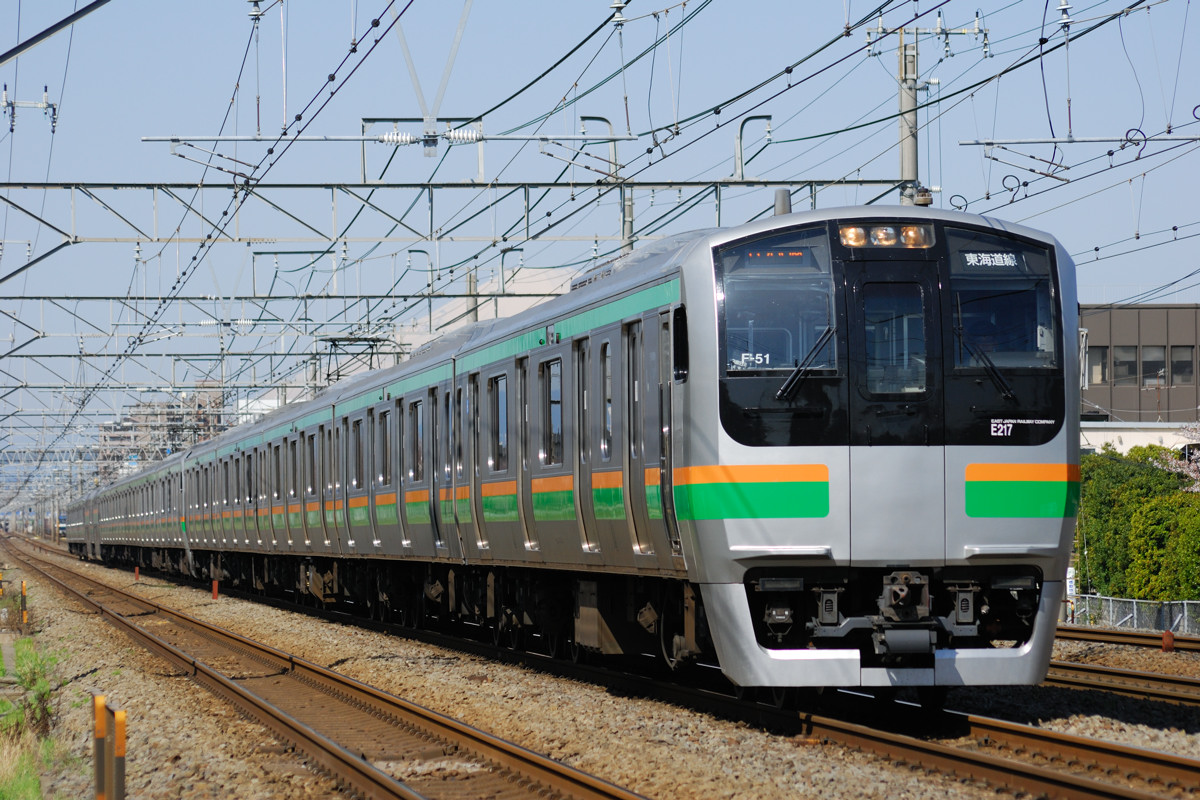
E217 series in Tōkaidō Line Shōnan livery, April 2007

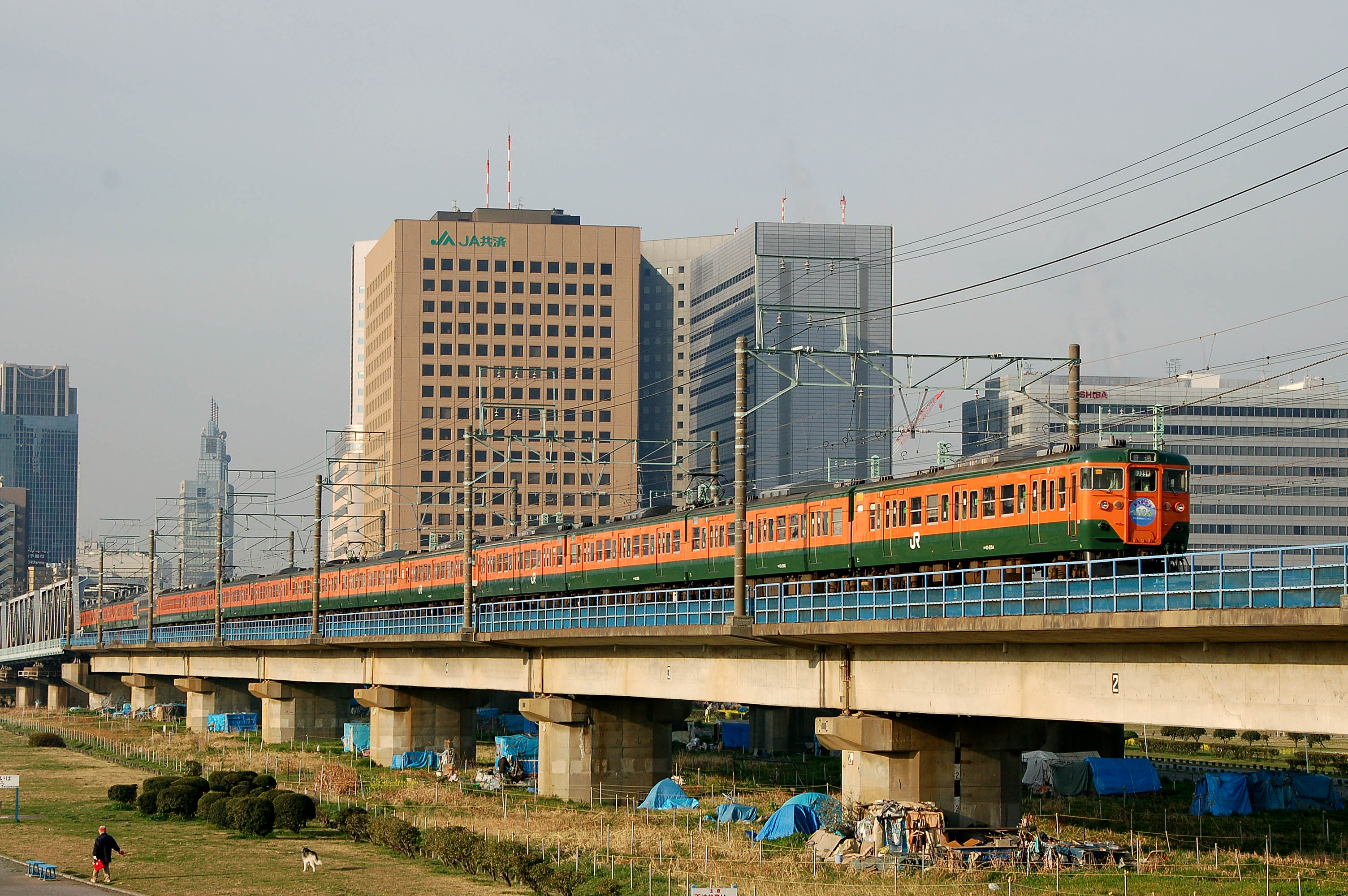
A 113 series approaching Yokohama, March 2006.
