= Arão =

Arão may refer to:

- Arão, Portugal, former parish in Valenca
- Willian Arão (born 1992), Brazilian footballer
