= Araos =

Araos or Araós may refer to:

== Places ==
- Araós, Catalonia, Spain

== People with the surname ==
- Ángelo Araos (born 1997), Chilean footballer
- Jerry Araos (1944–2012), Filipino artist and activist
- Jorge Araos (1904–1992), Chilean naval officer
- Phillip Araos (born 1990), Chilean footballer

== See also ==
- Arao (disambiguation)
