= Arao Station =

Arao Station (荒尾駅) is the name of two train stations in Japan:

- Arao Station (Gifu)
- Arao Station (Kumamoto)
