= Mino-Akasaka Station =

Railway station in Ōgaki, Gifu Prefecture, Japan

Mino-Akasaka Station 美濃赤坂駅
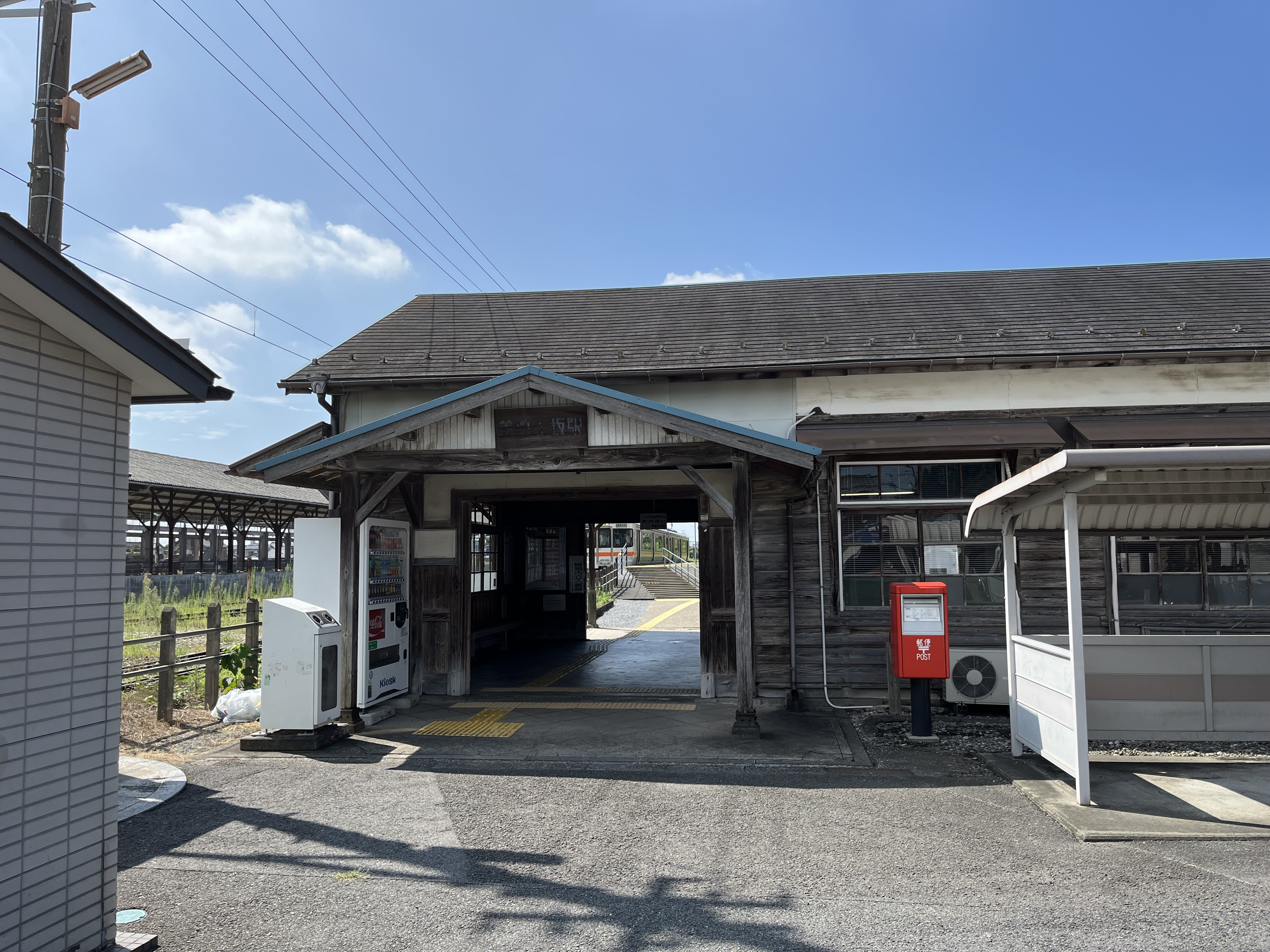
- Mino-Akasaka Station in August 2023

General information
- Location: Akasaka-cho, Ōgaki-shi, Gifu-ken 503-2213; Japan
- Coordinates: 35°23′12″N 136°34′56″E
- Operator: JR Central; JR Freight; Seinō Railway
- Line: ■ Tōkaidō Main Line (Mino-Akasaka Branch Line)
- Distance: 415.0 km from Tokyo
- Platforms: 1 side platform
- Tracks: 1

Other information
- Status: Unstaffed

History
- Opened: August 1, 1919
Location
- Location within Gifu Prefecture Location within Japan

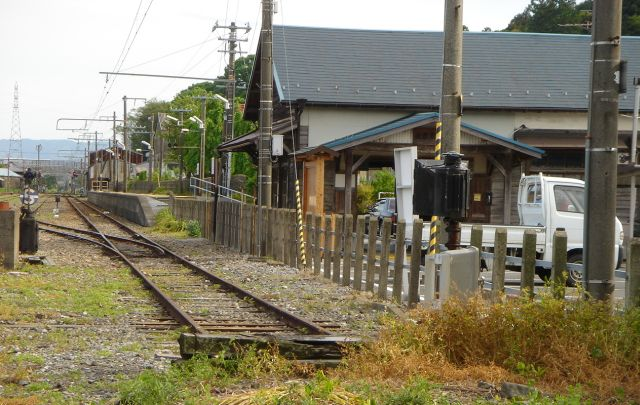
from the end of the line

Mino-Akasaka Station (美濃赤坂駅, Mino-Akasaka-eki) is a train station in the city of Ōgaki, Gifu Prefecture, Japan operated by the Central Japan Railway Company (JR Tōkai). It is also a freight terminal for the Japan Freight Railway Company.

== Lines ==
Mino-Akasaka Station is the terminal station for the JR Tōkai Tōkaidō Main Line (Mino-Akasaka Branch Line), and is located 3.4 from the start of the spur line at Ōgaki and 415.0 rail kilometers from Tokyo. The station is also served by the all-freight Seinō Railway's Ichihashi Line.

== Layout ==
Mino-Akasaka Station has one side platform serving a single bi-directional line. The station is unattended.

== Services ==
All trains operate as a shuttle service between Ogaki and Mino-Akasaka.

Services operate approximately every 45 minutes during morning and evening peak hours, but there are large gaps between services of 2–3 hours during the day. Running time is 7 minutes.

== Adjacent stations ==
«	Service	»
Central Japan Railway Company
Mino-Akasaka Branch Line
Arao	-	Terminus
Seinō Railway Company
Ichihashi Line
Terminus	-	Otomezaka

== History ==
Mino-Akasaka Station opened on August 1, 1919. The station was absorbed into the JR Tōkai network upon the privatization of the Japanese National Railways (JNR) on April 1, 1987.

== Surrounding area ==
- Kanabusan Jinja
- O-chaya yashiki site

== See also ==
- List of railway stations in Japan
