= Arao Station (Gifu) =

Railway station in Ōgaki, Gifu Prefecture, Japan

Arao Station 荒尾駅
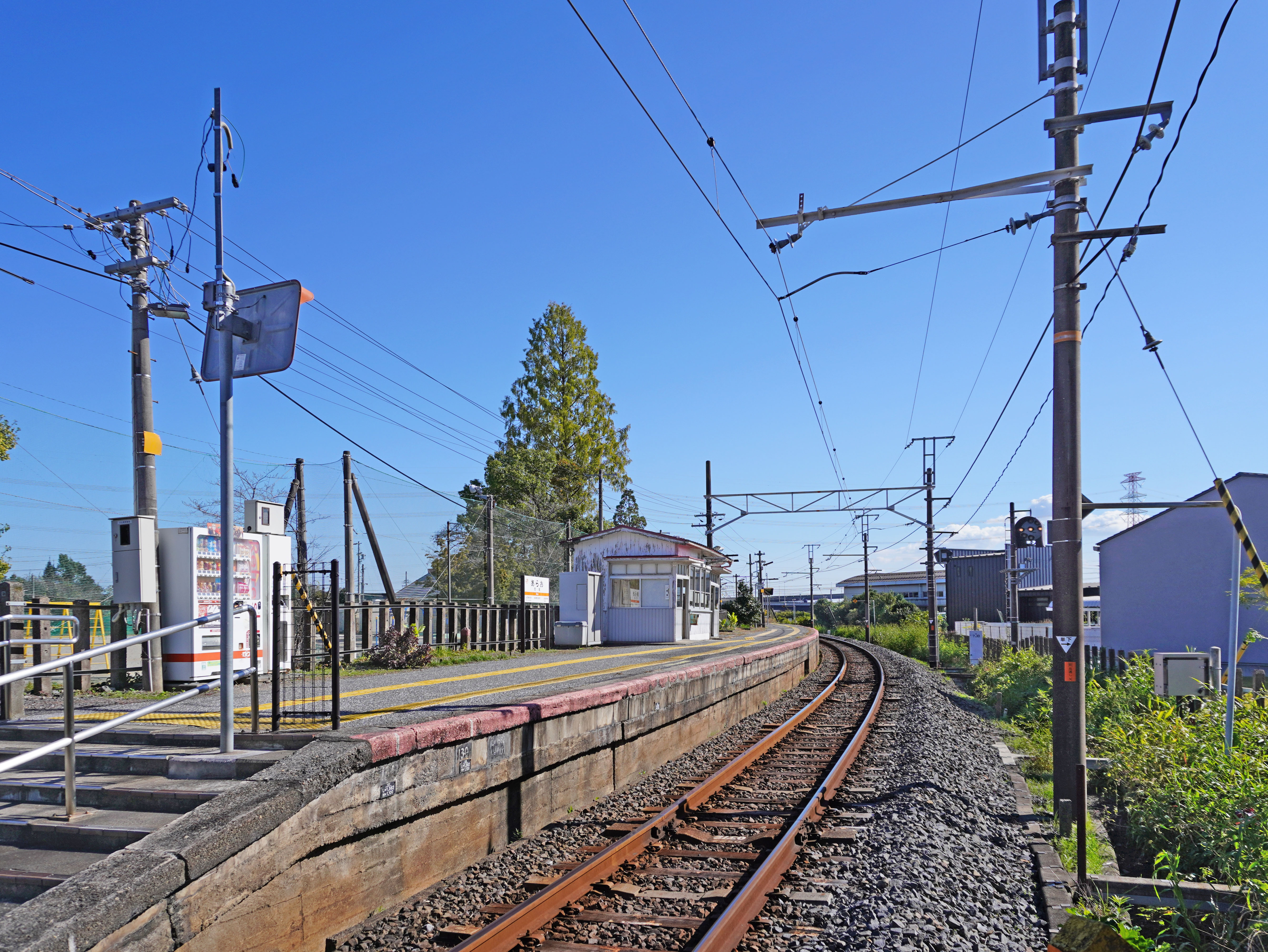
- Arao Station in November 2022

General information
- Location: Arao-cho, Ōgaki-shi, Gifu-ken 503-0034; Japan
- Coordinates: 35°22′25″N 136°35′00″E
- Operator: JR Central
- Line: ■ Tōkaidō Main Line (Mino-Akasaka Branch Line)
- Distance: 413.4 km from Tokyo
- Platforms: 1 side platform
- Tracks: 1

Other information
- Status: Unstaffed

History
- Opened: December 1, 1930
Location
- Location within Gifu Prefecture Location within Japan

Arao Station (荒尾駅, Arao-eki) is a train station in the city of Ōgaki, Gifu Prefecture, Japan operated by the Central Japan Railway Company (JR Tōkai).

== Lines ==
Arao Station is served by the JR Tōkai Tōkaidō Main Line (Mino-Akasaka Branch Line), and is located 3.4 from the start of the spur line at Ōgaki and 413.4 rail kilometers from Tokyo.

== Layout ==
Arao Station has one side platform serving a single bi-directional line. The station is unattended.

== Adjacent stations ==
«	Service	»
Central Japan Railway Company
Mino-Akasaka Branch Line
Ōgaki	-	Mino-Akasaka

== History ==
Arao Station opened on December 1, 1930. The station was absorbed into the JR Tōkai network upon the privatization of the Japanese National Railways (JNR) on April 1, 1987.

== Surrounding area ==
- Mikubi Jinja
- National Route 21

== See also ==
- List of railway stations in Japan
