= Seinō Railway =

Freight railway company in Gifu, Japan

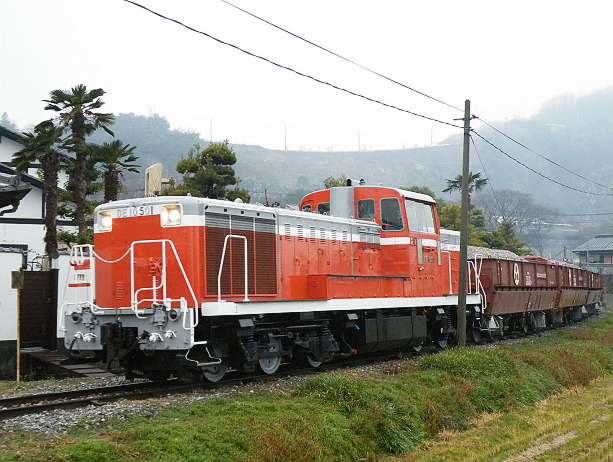
- Seino Railway DE10 501, January 2009

Overview
- Locale: Ōgaki, Gifu, Japan
- Dates of operation: 1927; 98 years ago–2013; 12 years ago

Technical
- Length: 3km

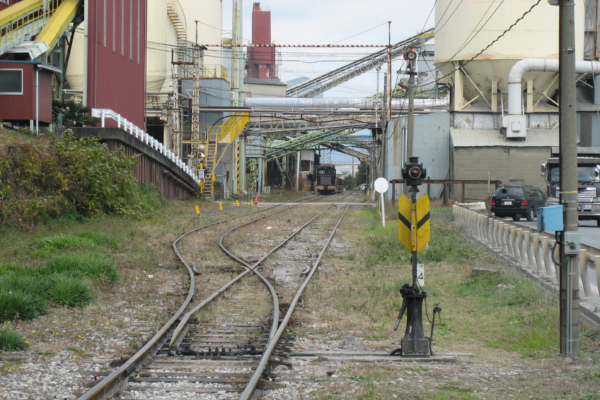
Otomezaka Station

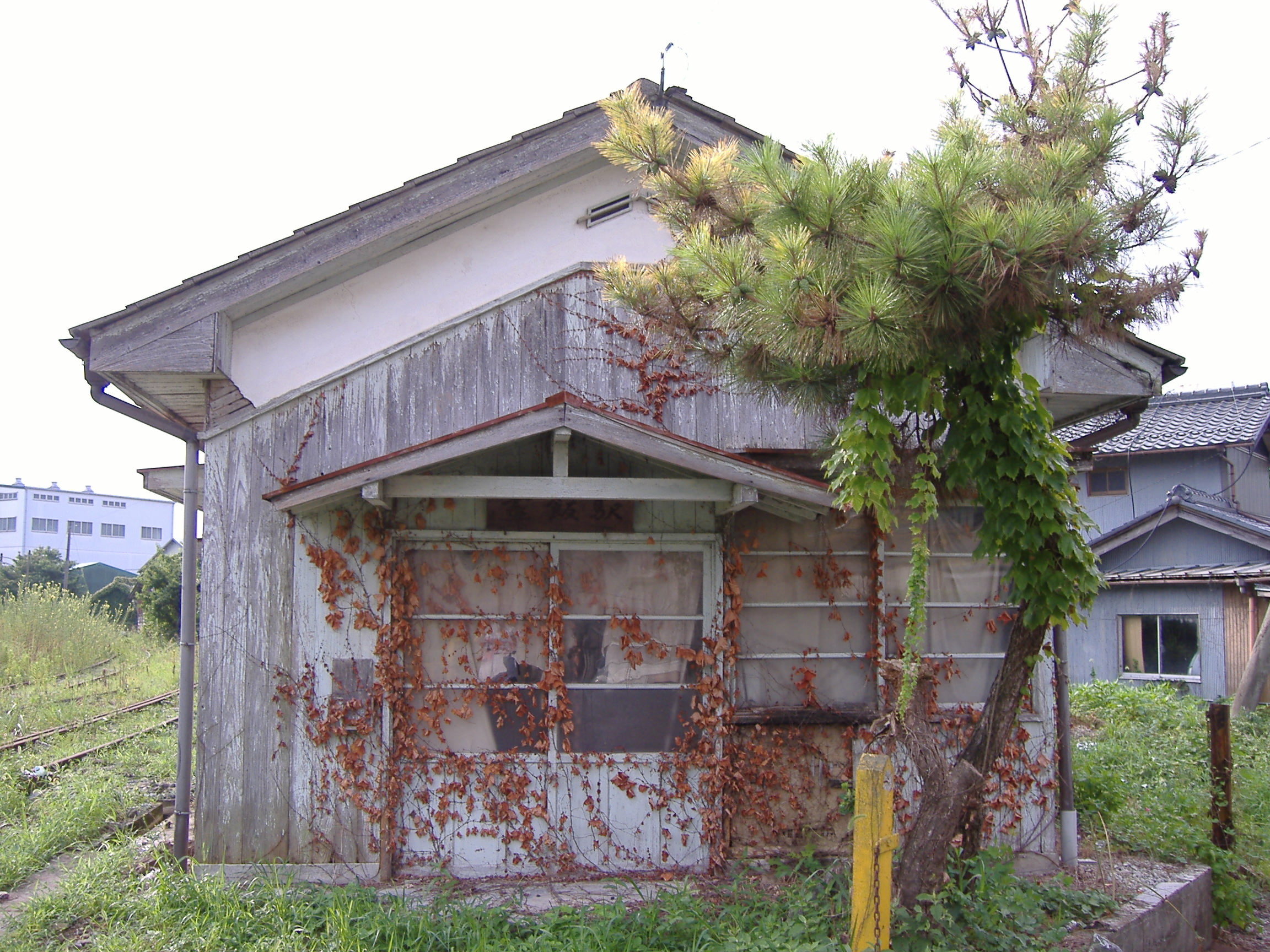
Hirui Station, virtually abandoned

The Seinō Railway (西濃鉄道, Seinō Tetsudō) is a freight only railway company in Ōgaki, Gifu, Japan. The company was founded in 1927. Its line mainly transports limestone. The company is not related to Seinō Transportation (西濃運輸), a transportation company with similar name, also based in Ōgaki. The company was reported as being dissolved in 2013.

== History ==
The 3km line from Mino-Akasaka to Ichihashi opened in 1928, and a passenger service operated from 1930 to 1945.

== Lines ==
- Ichihashi Line (市橋線)
  - Mino-Akasaka — Otomezaka: 1.3 km / 0.8 mi.

3 freight trains every day on the Ichihashi Line (市橋線). Hirui Line no longer in service.

Ichihashi Line (市橋線)

  - Otomezaka — Ichihashi: 1.3 km / 0.8 mi.
- Hirui Line (昼飯線)
  - Mino-Akasaka — Hirui: 1.9 km / 1.2 mi.

== See also ==
- List of railway companies in Japan
