= Emile Nguza Arao =

Kenyan aviator and corporate executive

- Born: Kenya
- Citizenship: Kenya
- Education: Embry-Riddle Aeronautical University
- Occupations: Aircraft maintenance engineer, corporate executive
- Years active: 2010–present
- Title: Designated Director General of Kenya Civil Aviation Authority

Emile Nguza Arao is a Kenyan aircraft maintenance engineer and corporate executive, who was appointed as the next executive director of the Kenya Civil Aviation Authority (KCAA), effective 22 April 2022. He was to be based in Nairobi, Kenya. Before that, from 20 October 2018 until 22 April 2022, he served as the executive director of the East African Civil Aviation Safety and Security Oversight Agency (EAC-Cassoa), based in Entebbe, Uganda.

== Background and education ==
Arao is Kenyan by birth. He attended local elementary and secondary schools. He holds a Bachelor of Science degree in aircraft engineering technology, awarded by Embry-Riddle Aeronautical University, in Daytona Beach, Florida, United States. His degree of Master of Business Administration, with a focus on aviation systems management, was also awarded by Embry-Riddle University.

== Career ==
Arao is described as a "highly talented and accomplished aviation professional" by James Macharia, his appointing authority and line cabinet minister.

Arao spent the years before the KCAA docket, as the head of the EAC-Cassoa, an institution of the East African Community. Before his appointment as the executive director of EAC-Cassoa, he was the deputy director of that institution.

At KCAA, Arao replaced Gilbert Kibe, who had served two consecutive three-year terms at the head of the government-owned institution.
