= Arão, Portugal =

Settlement in Valenca, Portugal

Arão is a settlement and former parish (freguesia) in the municipality of Valença, Portugal. In 2013 it was combined with two other parishes to form the new parish of Valença, Cristelo Covo e Arão.

The parish of Arão had a population of 624 in 1864 and 758 in 2011.
