= Tōkaidō Line (Shizuoka area) =

Railway line in Japan

Overview
- Native name: 東海道線
- Locale: Shizuoka prefecture, Aichi prefecture
- Termini: Atami; Toyohashi
- Stations: 44

Service
- Operator: JR Central

History
- Opened: 1 September 1889; 137 years ago (Between Hamamatsu Station and Ōbu Station)

Technical
- Track length: 189.0 km (117.4 mi)
- Track gauge: 1,067 mm (3 ft 6 in)
- Electrification: 1,500 V DC overhead catenary
- Operating speed: 110 km/h

This page describes details of the section of the Tōkaidō Main Line from Atami Station in Atami, Shizuoka Prefecture to Toyohashi Station in Toyohashi, Aichi Prefecture, operated by Central Japan Railway Company (JR Central).

== Overview ==
The Tokaido Main Line in the Shizuoka block, together with the parallel Tokaido Shinkansen, National Route 1, Tomei Expressway, and New Tomei Expressway, serves as an artery that crosses the prefecture from east to west.

The Tokaido Main Line used to be served by many superior trains connecting Tokyo with Nagoya, Keihanshin, and other parts of western Japan, but after the Tokaido Shinkansen started service in 1964, long-distance transportation was shifted to the Shinkansen, and the Tokaido Main Line is now mainly used for regional passenger transportation by local trains. After the February 1, 1984 timetable revision of Japan National Railways (JNR), the predecessor of JR, an urban-type timetable (city trains) was formed with shorter and more frequent regular trains, centering on the "Suruga Shuttle," which has been operated in the same way to this day. In addition, freight trains operated by Japan Freight Railway (JR Freight) also operate on the line.

In addition, while rapid trains (rapid, new rapid, special rapid, etc.) that do not require an additional fare run on the Tokaido Main Line in other areas, there are no rapid trains between Atami Station and Hamamatsu Station in the Shizuoka area, with the exception of a few. Only fee-based rapid trains such as the Home Liner, which require a boarding ticket of 330 yen (revised on October 1, 2019) in addition to the fare, run on this line.

From Atami City, the line runs through Kannami Town, Mishima City, Numazu City, and Fuji City in eastern Shizuoka Prefecture; Shizuoka City, Yaizu City, Fujieda City, and Shimada City in central Shizuoka Prefecture; Kikugawa City, Kakegawa City, Fukuroi City, Iwata City, Hamamatsu City, Kosai City, and other major cities in western Shizuoka Prefecture; and Toyohashi City, Aichi Prefecture.

In the eastern part of Shizuoka Prefecture, when the Tokaido Line began service in 1889, it bypassed Mt. Hakone and passed through Gotemba and Susono cities, the route of the current Gotemba Line, but in 1934, 45 years after the line began service, the current route was changed to the Tanna Tunnel through the mountain range that runs along the Izu Peninsula. The route between Atami Station and Mishima Station, including the Tanna Tunnel, and between Shimada Station and Kakegawa Station, which crosses the Makinohara Plateau on the border between the central and western regions of the prefecture, passes through mountainous areas, while the route between Kambara Station and Okitsu Station and near the Yoshimune Station passes along the Suruga Bay coast. The rest of the route is mostly plains, and the aforementioned cities are scattered in these plains. The Fuji, Abe, Oi, and Tenryu Rivers flow toward the Pacific Ocean, and the Tokaido Main Line crosses them by railway bridges. The Tokaido Main Line crosses these rivers by railway bridges. The line passes near the shore of Lake Hamana between Maisaka and Washizu Stations.

== History ==
The basis for the current regular train schedule in the Shizuoka area is the "Suruga Shuttle" service, which was established in the February 1, 1984 timetable revision. Prior to this, in the November 15, 1982 revision, JNR shortened the conventional regular train formation in the Hiroshima block and established an equally spaced, high frequency schedule. Following the success of the "Hiroshima City Train" service, in the February 1984 revision, a high frequency schedule was established in the Shizuoka metropolitan area along with the Sapporo, Okayama, Kitakyushu, and Fukuoka metropolitan areas, and the "Suruga Shuttle" service was launched at that time. The name "Shuttle" was used to promote the frequent service. Fuji motif was established, and the symbol mark was placed on the headmark and on the destination marker. As a result of this timetable revision, the number of short-distance regular tickets sold in the Shizuoka metropolitan area (February, March, and April 1984) increased by 7.6% compared to the previous year.

On November 1, 1986, the last year of JNR service, the number of trains was further increased, and a 10-minute interval was established between Okitsu and Shimada stations, which continues to this day, and 20-minute intervals were also established on other sections. In addition, new stations were built one after another from the end of the Japanese National Railways (JNR) era to just after the inauguration of JR Central. Although the nickname "Suruga Shuttle" was no longer used after the 1990s, on March 16, 1991 (Heisei 1991), the Mishima/Numazu metropolitan area and Hamamatsu metropolitan area also began operating four trains per hour, and this system continued until March 17, 2007. The Home Liner (commuter liner), which has been operating in the morning and evening in various metropolitan areas of Japan since the end of the Japanese National Railways (JNR), was also introduced in the Shizuoka area on March 16, 1991, and has been increasing the number of services.

On March 18, 2007, a blanket schedule revision was made for the first time in about 20 years. This revision increased the number of section trains in the Mishima/Numazu and Hamamatsu metropolitan areas in addition to the Shizuoka metropolitan area, while reducing the number of long-distance trains between Atami, Mishima, Hamamatsu, and Toyohashi stations, as well as between Fuji and Okitsu stations and between Shimada and Kakegawa stations. The revised timetable has since been retained, while the number of direct Gotemba Line trains in the Mishima and Numazu areas has been increased, leading to the current timetable.

The March 16, 2024 timetable revision changed the previous daytime operation pattern. The trains previously operated during the daytime between Atami Station, Mishima Station, Numazu Station - Shizuoka Station and Shimada Station, between Okitsu Station, Shizuoka Station - Shimada Station and Hamamatsu Station, and between Atami Station and Numazu Station were reorganized into two patterns, one between Atami Station and Hamamatsu Station and the other between Okitsu Station and Shimada Station, each operating three trains per hour. Section trains between Mishima and Numazu, Kakegawa and Hamamatsu, and Hamamatsu and Toyohashi will be maintained, and the number of trains between each station will be maintained.

- 1950.
  - March 1: The 80 series "Shonan Train" started operation between Tokyo Station and Numazu Station.
  - July: "Shonan Tram" was extended to Shizuoka Station.
- February 15, 1951: The "Shonan Train" was extended to Hamamatsu Station.
- In the 1960s, local trains operated about one per hour.
- As of September 1964, there were about one or two long-distance local trains per hour running between Tokyo and Numazu/Shizuoka/Hamamamatsu/Toyohashi/Nagoya stations, between Numazu and Toyohashi/Okazaki/Maibara stations, between Shizuoka and Maibara stations, and between Hamamatsu and Ogaki/Kyoto stations, and about three hourly honor trains to/from Tokyo.
- March 15, 1972: Rapid service was set up during the daytime, and together with the Local Trains, about two trains per hour were operated. In addition, daytime Local Trains to/from Tokyo Station were operated until Hamamatsu Station.
- October 2, 1978: Rapid service was discontinued, and local trains between Atami Station and Hamamatsu Station became two per hour (every 30 minutes). Between Hamamatsu and Toyohashi stations, one Local Train per hour was operated.
- February 1, 1984: The "Suruga Shuttle" began service during the daytime. Four trains per hour (every 15 minutes) were operated between Okitsu and Shimada stations, including the existing medium-distance trains. The trains used were the 111 series and 113 series of the Shizuoka Operation Center (now the Shizuoka Trains Center), and were generally four-car trains. In addition, the number of trains between Hamamatsu Station and Toyohashi Station was increased to two per hour (every 30 minutes) during the daytime.
- March 14, 1985: About one section train per hour was set up between Mishima Station and Numazu/Fuji Station as "Alpha Train [Note 2]" .
- November 1, 1986: The last timetable revision by JNR took place. The number of trains between Okitsu and Shimada stations was increased to six per hour (every 10 minutes). Eight two-car 119 series trains were converted from the Toyohashi Electric Train Center (now the Toyohashi Operation Center) and given a special paint scheme and air conditioning modifications. Until the end of March 1987, when the required number of trains had been completed, the 111 series trains were also used, just before they were scrapped. The number of trains between Mishima and Okitsu stations, Shimada and Hamamatsu stations, and Hamamatsu and Toyohashi stations became three per hour (every 20 minutes), and one rapid train in the Nagoya area per hour started running to and from Hamamatsu Station.
- April 1, 1987: With the privatization of Japan National Railways (JNR), the Tokaido Line in Shizuoka area was managed by Central Japan Railway Company (JR Central).
- March 13, 1988: The "Suruga Shuttle" service was expanded to operate between Fuji and Shimada stations, with six trains per hour during the daytime on this route. This revision added 115 series trains transferred from the Jinryo Train District (now the Jinryo Sharyo District) and some 115 series trains used on the Minobu Line and Gotemba Line to the service. The three down trains and two up trains departing from the Tokyo Exit of the JR East Tokaido Line (excluding night trains) no longer serve Hamamatsu Station, and one up train departs from Shimada Station, while all others are shortened to depart from Shizuoka Station. As a result, the direct daytime regular trains between Tokyo Station and Shizuoka area were operated only up to Shimada Station. The regular trains between upstream Fuji Station and Tokyo Station have been extended to depart from Shizuoka Station, and the first upstream train at Shizuoka Station has been moved up 20 minutes. Direct trains from Shizuoka area to Nagoya area (toward Gifu and Ogaki) were also reduced.
- 1989
  - March 11: Series 119 trains were discontinued because their performance was not suitable for high-speed operation, and they were returned to operation on the Iida Line. New Series 211 trains were introduced in its place, but until its inauguration, Series 115 trains scheduled to be scrapped were used. 211 Series had three-car formation, and its formation symbol was "SS" which indicates shuttle though.
  - July: "Hananoki-Kin-go", a late-night weekend train with seating capacity by Series 311 trains, was operated between Shizuoka and Hamamatsu Stations.
- March 10, 1990: Until then, during the daytime, trains alternated every 10 minutes between the Fuji Station - Shimada Station turnaround and the Numazu area - Hamamatsu Station, but from this revision, the operation pattern was changed and more trains were operated between Fuji Station and Hamamatsu Station. As a result, the starting and ending stations of some "Suruga Shuttle" trains were changed to Hamamatsu Station, and the service between Shimada and Hamamatsu Stations became four trains per hour.
- March 16, 1991: Some trains between Fuji and Shimada Stations were extended to depart from and arrive at Numazu and Mishima Stations. As a result, some "Suru Shuttle" trains started and ended at Numazu and Mishima Stations, and four trains per hour were operated between Mishima and Fuji Stations. In addition, a new direct Minobu Line train with no stops between Numazu Station and Fuji Station was established to connect with the "Asagiri" limited express. The first "Homeliner" service in the Shizuoka area was added during commuting hours, using 371 series trains for the "Asagiri." Some trains using the 211 series started to operate at a maximum speed of 110 km/h, increasing the speed.
- March 14, 1992: The holiday schedule was introduced from this revision. One direct round trip train from Tokyo Station to Shizuoka Station was shortened to Numazu Station.
- March 18, 1993: Saturday and holiday timetables were introduced. One round-trip commuter rapid service per day was provided during weekday rush hours west of Shizuoka Station.
- 1995
  - October 1: Due to a timetable revision accompanying the conversion of the Minobu Line express "Fujikawa" to limited express, the number of non-stop direct Minobu Line trains between Numazu Station and Fuji Station was reduced by one round trip.
  - October 10, : The line between Shinjyobara Station and Maibara Station was converted to CTC.
- March 16, 1996: Limited Express "Tokai" started service between Tokyo and Shizuoka Stations, replacing the Express "Tokai". The 373 series for the limited express "Fujikawa" and "Tokai" were introduced to the home liner service, and two runs each for the up and down trains were newly set up. Some of the non-stop Minobu Line direct trains between Numazu Station and Fuji Station became local train stops. Friday late-night regular trains between Numazu and Shizuoka Stations became "Hanaki-Kin-go" with seating capacity.
- March 22, 1997 : "Hananoki-Kin-go" and "Hanaki-Kin-go" were changed to "Homeliner Hamamatsu" and "Homeliner Shizuoka" respectively.
- March 14, 1998: All direct trains on the Minobu Line stopped at each station. One direct round trip train from Tokyo Station to Shizuoka Station was shortened to Numazu Station.
- 1999
  - This year: With the introduction of the 313 series to the Gotemba and Minobu Lines, some of the 115 series trains used on both lines began to be operated on Tokaido Main Line trains.
  - December 6: The Kannami and Shinshobaru stations were converted to CTC and PRC.
- October 16, 2004: The number of direct local trains to and from JR East area was drastically reduced. The direct daytime trains that used to run to Numazu Station about once an hour have been discontinued. The remaining morning and evening trains were also shortened to Numazu Station, except for one round trip by the 373 series to Shizuoka Station.
- March 18, 2007: Blank schedule revision was made in Shizuoka area. Increased the number of sectional trains in the Mishima/Numazu and Hamamatsu metropolitan areas. A new train was added to the service between Fuji Station and Numazu Station, and one that turns around at Kakegawa Station and heads toward Hamamatsu. Service was reduced between Fuji Station and Okitsu Station and between Shimada Station and Kakegawa Station. By this revision, 103 new 313 series cars were installed, and the operation of 113 and 115 series cars was terminated on the previous day. With some exceptions, the 211 and 313 series trains are now in operation, and the maximum speed has been standardized at 110 km/h. In addition, one more round-trip Homeliner service was added. The limited express "Tokai" and commuter rapid trains were discontinued.
- March 2009: In the Mishima/Numazu area, the number of direct trains between the Gotemba Line and Mishima Station for the Tokaido Shinkansen connection was increased to 16 trains, both up and down. The Homeliner departing from Mishima was changed to depart from Numazu. In addition, the regular service of the Moonlight nagara was terminated.
- March 14, 2011 – June 5, 2011: Due to the power shortage caused by the Great East Japan Earthquake on March 11, 2011, planned blackouts were implemented in the Tokyo Electric Power Company area.
- March 17, 2012: The last remaining direct local train between Tokyo Station and Shizuoka Station was discontinued.
- March 16, 2013: The nighttime "Homeliner Numazu" service was rescheduled to improve connections with the Minobu and Gotemba Lines. One more direct train between Mishima Station and the Gotemba Line was added during the daytime.
- March 15, 2014: One more nighttime "Homeliner Numazu" service was added.
- March 14, 2015: One more round-trip "Homeliner Numazu" service was added in the evening. Also, due to operational changes following the start of the Ueno Tokyo Line operation by JR East, the number of direct trains to and from Tokyo was reduced by one round trip.
- 2017.
  - March 4: Nighttime "Homeliner Numazu No. 6" and "Homeliner Shizuoka No. 3" trains stopped operating on Saturdays and holidays. The "Homeliner Shizuoka No. 21", which had operated on Fridays until the previous day, was replaced by a rapid train with regular cars at about the same time, which began operation only on Fridays and Saturdays.
  - Nov. 8: Operation management system updated (from Nov. 22, the information display at stations was sequentially enhanced).
  - March 17, 2018: Station numbering and line colors were introduced. The route code for this line is "CA" and the line color is orange. However, "CA30" was absent at the time of introduction and assigned to Mikuriya Station between Fukuroi and Iwata Stations (opening on March 14, 2020).
- March 29, 2020: Temporary service on "Moonlight Nagara" was terminated.
- March 12, 2022: All homeliners operated on Saturdays and holidays were discontinued.
- March 16, 2024: The daytime operation pattern was changed. The trains that had previously operated between major stations during the daytime were reorganized into two patterns, one between Atami Station and Hamamatsu Station, and the other between Okitsu Station and Shimada Station, with three trains per hour each. In addition, two of the direct local trains to/from Numazu Station in the JR East area will be reduced in frequency (to/from Atami Station), and one of them will be shortened to 5-car trains by changing the service between Kōzu Station and Numazu Station (while also connecting with trains running between Tokyo Station and Kōzu Station) .

== Mode of Operation ==
This section provides details of the operational structure as of the March 16, 2024 timetable revision. Trains in the Shizuoka area are mainly Local Trains that stop at every stations, and there are no regularly scheduled rapid trains as seen in other areas of the Tokaido Main Line (exceptions are described below). There is a direct connection between Hamamatsu Station and Toyohashi Station by rapid trains from the Nagoya area, but all types of trains stop at each station in this section. In addition, some sections of the line are served by limited express trains that directly connect to other lines, homeliners during morning and evening rush hours, and sleeper limited express trains at night.

=== Superior Trains ===
As of the March 2024 revision, the honor trains operating in the Shizuoka area include the limited express "Fujikawa" between Fuji Station and Shizuoka Station, which connects directly to the Minobu Line from Fuji Station, making seven round trips on day trains, and the limited express "Odoriko" that connects directly from Tokyo to the Izu Hakone Railway Sunzu Line via Mishima Station, making two round trips on weekdays and three round trips on weekends and holidays. Tokai" (express until March 15, 1996, and limited express after March 16, 1996) used to operate between Tokyo Station and Shizuoka Station, but was discontinued with the revision on March 18, 2007.

As for night trains, the Blue Train was completely discontinued on March 13, 2009 (based on the first station), leaving only one regular train, the "Sunrise Seto Izumo", a sleeper train that has been in service since July 10, 1998. The Rapid "Moonlight Nagara" also operated as a temporary train, but it will no longer operate after departing Ogaki on March 29, 2020, and it was announced that it will end its service on January 22, 2021.

=== Home Liner ===
The Home Liner, which requires a separate boarding ticket, is operated between Numazu Station, Shizuoka Station, and Hamamatsu Station mainly in the morning and evening as an interchange operation of limited express trains. The 371 series for the limited express "Asagiri" started operation in the March 16, 1991 timetable revision, and later the 373 series for the limited express "Fujikawa" joined the service in the March 1996 revision. Since the March 2012 revision, only 373 series trains have been used.。

All of them pass through all stations except for some stations (mainly representative stations of cities and wards) and operate express services. Currently, trains stop at Numazu Station, Fuji Station, Shimizu Station, Shizuoka Station, Fujieda Station, Shimada Station, Kikugawa Station, Kakegawa Station, Fukuroi Station, Iwata Station, and Hamamatsu Station. In the past, some trains stopped at Yoshiwara Station and Kambara Station, and some trains stopped at each station late at night.

The train names for both morning and evening trains are "Homeliner Numazu", "Homeliner Shizuoka", and "Homeliner Hamamatsu" after the destination station. Some trains are connected to the Tokaido Shinkansen at Shizuoka and Hamamatsu Stations. At night, trains in the down direction run every hour.

Due to operational reasons, the "Homeliner Numazu No. 2" will be operated as a local train bound for Atami at Numazu Station, so that a numbered ticket is no longer required between Numazu and Atami Stations. The "Homeliner Hamamatsu No. 3" also operated at Hamamatsu Station as a local train bound for Toyohashi until the March 2022 timetable revision.

Since only one train of the 371 series used to be in operation, it was operated as a rapid train with a car for regular trains when the same train was undergoing regular inspection, and in this case, a boarding ticket was not required.

=== Semi Rapid, Rapid, New Rapid, Special Rapid ===
Some of these trains have direct service between Toyohashi Station and Hamamatsu Station from the Nagoya area.Stops at all passenger stations between Toyohashi Station and Hamamatsu Station.

=== Rapid (Temporary Train) ===
This is a ticket-free train set up as the successor to the "Homeliner Shizuoka No. 21," which operated until March 3, 2017. The 23:00 p.m. down train from Mishima to Numazu is extended to Shizuoka on Fridays, Saturdays, and days before holidays. Therefore, the extended operation section is treated as an extra train and is not listed in the timetable on JR Central's official website. The train operates as a Local Train between Mishima and Numazu Stations, and only the extended operation section between Numazu, Fuji, and Shizuoka Stations is treated as a Rapid Train. Stops on the way are at Fuji Station and Shimizu Station. At Mishima Station, it connects with the last downbound train of the Tōkaidō Shinkansen, the "Kodama" No. 815.

=== Local ===
As of March 16, 2024, there are 4 down trains and 1 up train on weekdays and 3 down trains and 1 up train on weekends and holidays between Atami Station and Toyohashi Station.

During the daytime (roughly from 10:00 to 15:00), the local train schedule is patterned almost hourly, but the schedule is not completely patterned, and the intervals and sections of trains may vary depending on the time of day.

Basically, there are three to six trains per hour. The trains between Atami Station and Hamamatsu Station (B) and between Okitsu Station and Shimada Station (C) run three times per hour (about every 20 minutes), and between Okitsu Station, Shizuoka Station, and Shimada Station in Shizuoka City and its suburbs, B and C run alternately, with a schedule of six trains per hour (about every 10 minutes). In the Fuji, Numazu, and Mishima areas, there are an average of two A trains per hour between Mishima and Numazu stations, and a rare A' train, which is an extension of A to Fuji station, with an average of five A, A', and B trains per hour between Mishima and Numazu stations. In the Hamamatsu/Kakegawa area, there is one train (D) per hour between Kakegawa Station and Hamamatsu Station, and the total number of trains between Kakegawa Station and Hamamatsu Station including this and B is 4 trains per hour. Between Hamamatsu Station and Toyohashi Station, there are three trains (E) per hour (every 20 minutes) only for this section.

== Station list ==
- Legend
  - （F）= Freight Depot
- Stop Stations
  - Local：All passenger stations.
    - Semi Rapid, Rapid, New Rapid, and Special Rapid：Direct service between Nagoya area and Shizuoka area (between Hamamatsu Station and Toyohashi Station), stop at all passenger stations in Shizuoka area.
  - Home Liner and Rapid (Temporary Train)：⚫︎=stop,|= Pass through.

No.	Station	Japanese	Distance (km)		Rapid (Temporary Train)	Home Liner	Transfers	Location	
No.	Station	Japanese	Between Stations	Total (From Tokyo)	Rapid (Temporary Train)	Home Liner	Transfers	Location	
CA00	Atami	熱海		104.6			Tōkaidō Shinkansen; Itō Line	Atami	Shizuoka
CA01	Kannami	函南	9.9	114.5				Kannami, Tagata District	Shizuoka
CA02	Mishima	三島	6.2	120.7	●		Tōkaidō Shinkansen ■ Izuhakone Railway Sunzu Line (some morning/evening through services)	Mishima	Shizuoka
CA03	Numazu	沼津	5.5	126.2	●	●	Gotemba Line	Numazu	Shizuoka
CA04	Katahama	片浜	4.1	130.3	●	|		Numazu	Shizuoka
CA05	Hara	原	2.5	132.8	●	|		Numazu	Shizuoka
CA06	Higashi-Tagonoura	東田子の浦	4.6	137.4	●	|		Fuji	Shizuoka
CA07	Yoshiwara	吉原	3.9	141.3	●	|	■ Gakunan Railway Line	Fuji	Shizuoka
CA08	Fuji	富士	4.9	146.2	●	●	Minobu Line	Fuji	Shizuoka
CA09	Fujikawa	富士川	3.5	149.7	|	|		Fuji	Shizuoka
CA10	Shin-Kambara	新蒲原	2.8	152.5	|	|		Shimizu-ku, Shizuoka	Shizuoka
CA11	Kambara	蒲原	2.4	154.9	|	|		Shimizu-ku, Shizuoka	Shizuoka
CA12	Yui	由比	3.5	158.4	|	|		Shimizu-ku, Shizuoka	Shizuoka
CA13	Okitsu	興津	5.9	164.3	|	|		Shimizu-ku, Shizuoka	Shizuoka
CA14	Shimizu	清水	4.7	169.0	●	●		Shimizu-ku, Shizuoka	Shizuoka
CA15	Kusanagi	草薙	5.2	174.2	|	|	Shizuoka Railway Shizuoka-Shimizu Line	Shimizu-ku, Shizuoka	Shizuoka
	（F）Shizuoka Freight Depot	静岡貨物駅	2.5	176.7	|	|		Suruga-ku, Shizuoka	Shizuoka
CA16	Higashi-Shizuoka	東静岡	3.5	177.7	|	|		Aoi-ku, Shizuoka	Shizuoka
CA17	Shizuoka	静岡	2.5	180.2	●	●	Tōkaidō Shinkansen; Shizuoka Railway Shizuoka-Shimizu Line (Shin-Shizuoka)	Aoi-ku, Shizuoka	Shizuoka
CA18	Abekawa	安倍川	4.3	184.5		|		Suruga-ku, Shizuoka	Shizuoka
CA19	Mochimune	用宗	2.1	186.6		|		Suruga-ku, Shizuoka	Shizuoka
CA20	Yaizu	焼津	7.1	193.7		|		Yaizu	Shizuoka
CA21	Nishi-Yaizu	西焼津	3.3	197.0		|		Yaizu	Shizuoka
CA22	Fujieda	藤枝	3.3	200.3		●		Fujieda	Shizuoka
CA23	Rokugō	六合	4.6	204.9		|		Shimada	Shizuoka
CA24	Shimada	島田	2.9	207.8		●		Shimada	Shizuoka
CA25	Kanaya	金谷	5.1	212.9		|	Oigawa Railway Oigawa Main Line	Shimada	Shizuoka
CA26	Kikugawa	菊川	9.3	222.2		●		Kikugawa	Shizuoka
CA27	Kakegawa	掛川	7.1	229.3		●	Tōkaidō Shinkansen; Tenryū Hamanako Railroad	Kakegawa	Shizuoka
CA28	Aino	愛野	5.3	234.6		|		Fukuroi	Shizuoka
CA29	Fukuroi	袋井	3.5	238.1		●		Fukuroi	Shizuoka
CA30	Mikuriya	御厨	4.6	242.7		|		Iwata	Shizuoka
CA31	Iwata	磐田	3.2	245.9		●		Iwata	Shizuoka
CA32	Toyodachō	豊田町	2.9	248.8		|		Iwata	Shizuoka
CA33	Tenryūgawa	天竜川	3.9	252.7		|		Chūō-ku, Hamamatsu	Shizuoka
CA34	Hamamatsu	浜松	4.4	257.1		●	Tokaido Shinkansen; Enshū Railway Line (Shin-Hamamatsu)	Chūō-ku, Hamamatsu	Shizuoka
	（F）Nishi-Hamamatsu	西浜松	2.0	259.1				Chūō-ku, Hamamatsu	Shizuoka
CA35	Takatsuka	高塚	5.3	262.4				Chūō-ku, Hamamatsu	Shizuoka
CA36	Maisaka	舞阪	5.1	267.5				Chūō-ku, Hamamatsu	Shizuoka
CA37	Bentenjima	弁天島	2.3	269.8				Chūō-ku, Hamamatsu	Shizuoka
CA38	Araimachi	新居町	3.1	272.9				Kosai	Shizuoka
CA39	Washizu	鷲津	3.7	276.6				Kosai	Shizuoka
CA40	Shinjohara	新所原	5.8	282.4			Tenryū Hamanako Railroad	Kosai	Shizuoka
CA41	Futagawa	二川	4.3	286.7				Toyohashi	Aichi
CA42	Toyohashi	豊橋	6.9	293.6			Tōkaidō Shinkansen; Iida Line; NH Meitetsu Nagoya Main Line; Toyohashi Railroad Atsumi Line (Shin-Toyohashi), Toyohashi Railroad Azumada Main Line (Ekimae)	Toyohashi	Aichi
