= Mochimune Station =

Railway station in Shizuoka, Japan

CA19 Mochimune Station 用宗駅
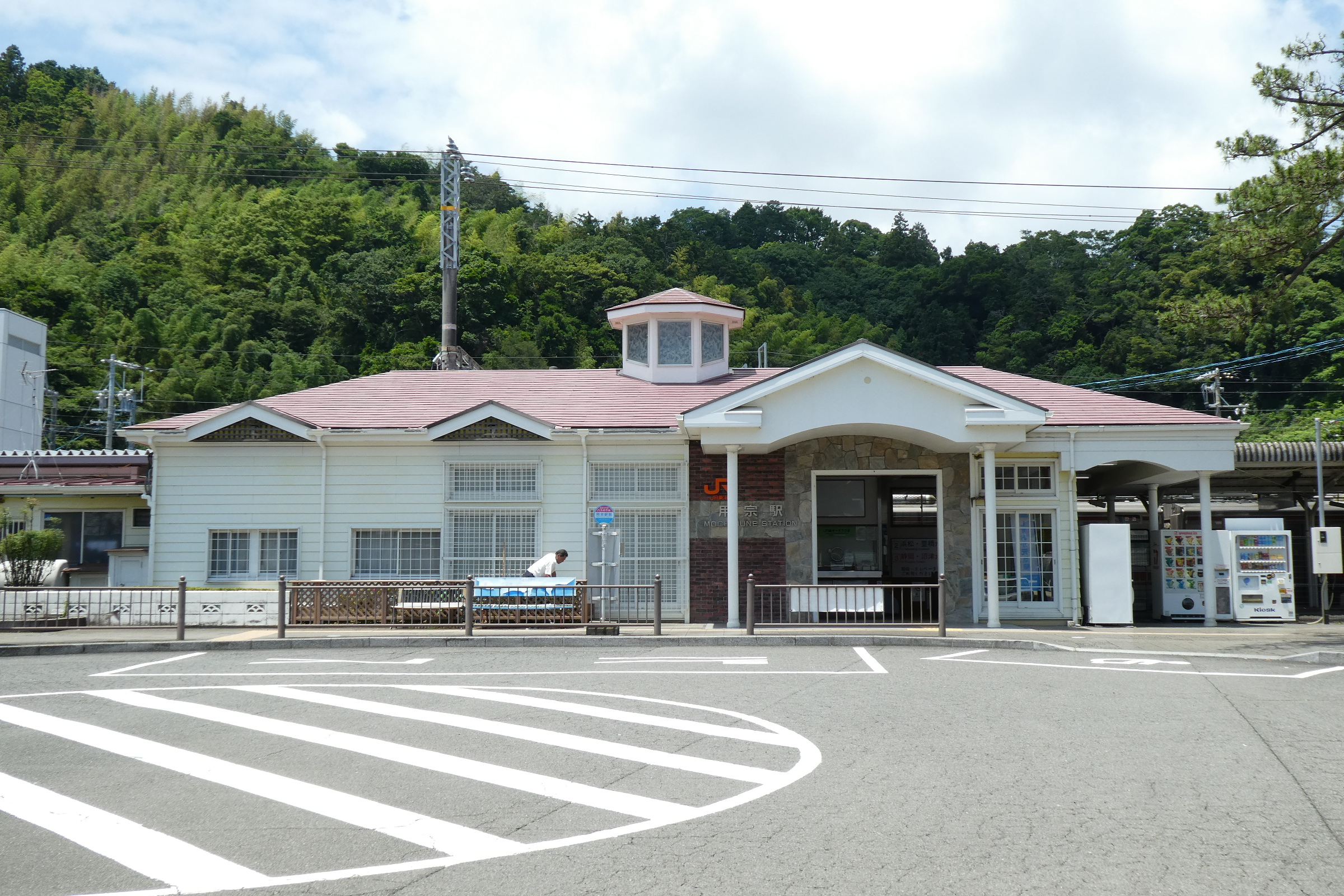
- JR Mochimune Station in June 2019

General information
- Location: 4-1 Mochimune-Shiroyama, Suruga-ku, Shizuoka-shi, Shizuoka-ken; Japan
- Coordinates: 34°55′17″N 138°21′32″E
- Operator: JR Central
- Line: Tokaido Main Line
- Distance: 186.6 kilometers from Tokyo
- Platforms: 1 island + 1 side platform

Other information
- Status: Staffed
- Station code: CA19
- Website: Official website

History
- Opened: November 1, 1909

Passengers
- FY2017: 1,537 daily
Location
- Location within Shizuoka Prefecture Location within Japan

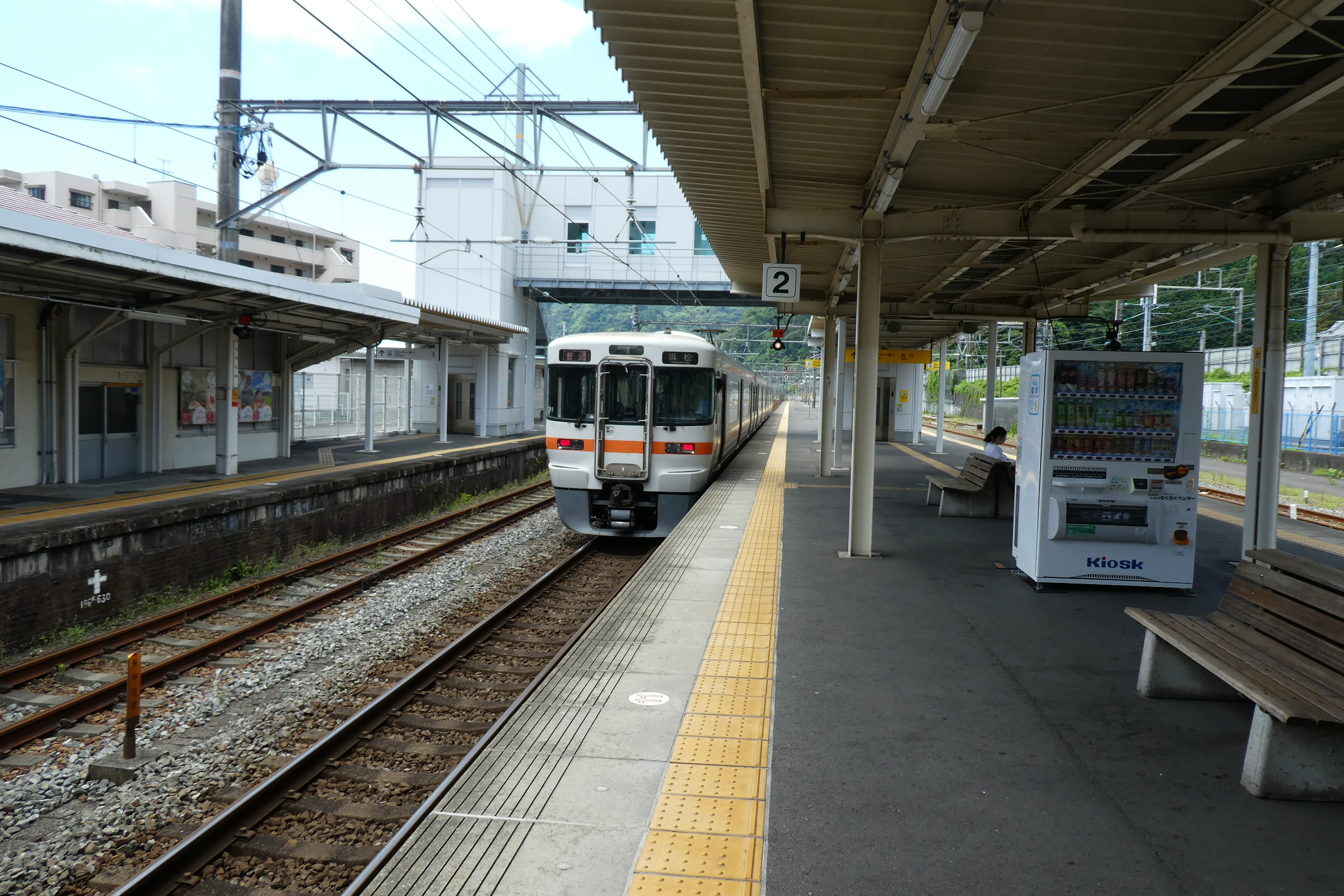
Mochimune Station platforms

Mochimune Station (用宗駅, Mochimune-eki) is a railway station in Suruga-ku, Shizuoka City, Shizuoka Prefecture, Japan, operated by Central Japan Railway Company (JR Tōkai).

== Lines ==
Mochimune Station is served by the Tōkaidō Main Line, and is located 186.6 kilometers from the starting point of the line at Tokyo Station.

== Station layout ==
The station has an island platform serving Track 2 and Track 3, and a side platform serving the seldom-used Track 1. The platforms are connected to the station building by a footbridge. The station building has automated ticket machines, TOICA automated turnstiles and a staffed ticket office.

=== Platforms ===
1	■ Tōkaidō Main Line	auxiliary platform
2	■ Tōkaidō Main Line	For Fujieda, Yaizu, Shimada, Hamamatsu
3	■ Tōkaidō Main Line	For Shizuoka, Numazu

== Adjacent stations ==
«	Service	»
Central Japan Railway Company
Tōkaidō Main Line
Commuter Rapid: Does not stop at this station
Rapid: Does not stop at this station
Abekawa	Local	Yaizu

== History ==
A signal box was established at the site of present-day Mochimune Station on December 21, 1902. It was rebuilt as a station for both passenger and freight services on November 1, 1909. Regularly scheduled freight service was discontinued in 1974.

Station numbering was introduced to the section of the Tōkaidō Line operated JR Central in March 2018; Mochimune Station was assigned station number CA19.

== Passenger statistics ==
In fiscal 2017, the station was used by an average of 1,537 passengers daily (boarding passengers only).

== Surrounding area ==
- Mochimune Fishing Port
- Mochimune Beach
- Site of Mochimune Castle

== See also ==
- List of railway stations in Japan
