= Yaizu Station =

Railway station in Yaizu, Shizuoka Prefecture, Japan

CA20 Yaizu Station 焼津駅
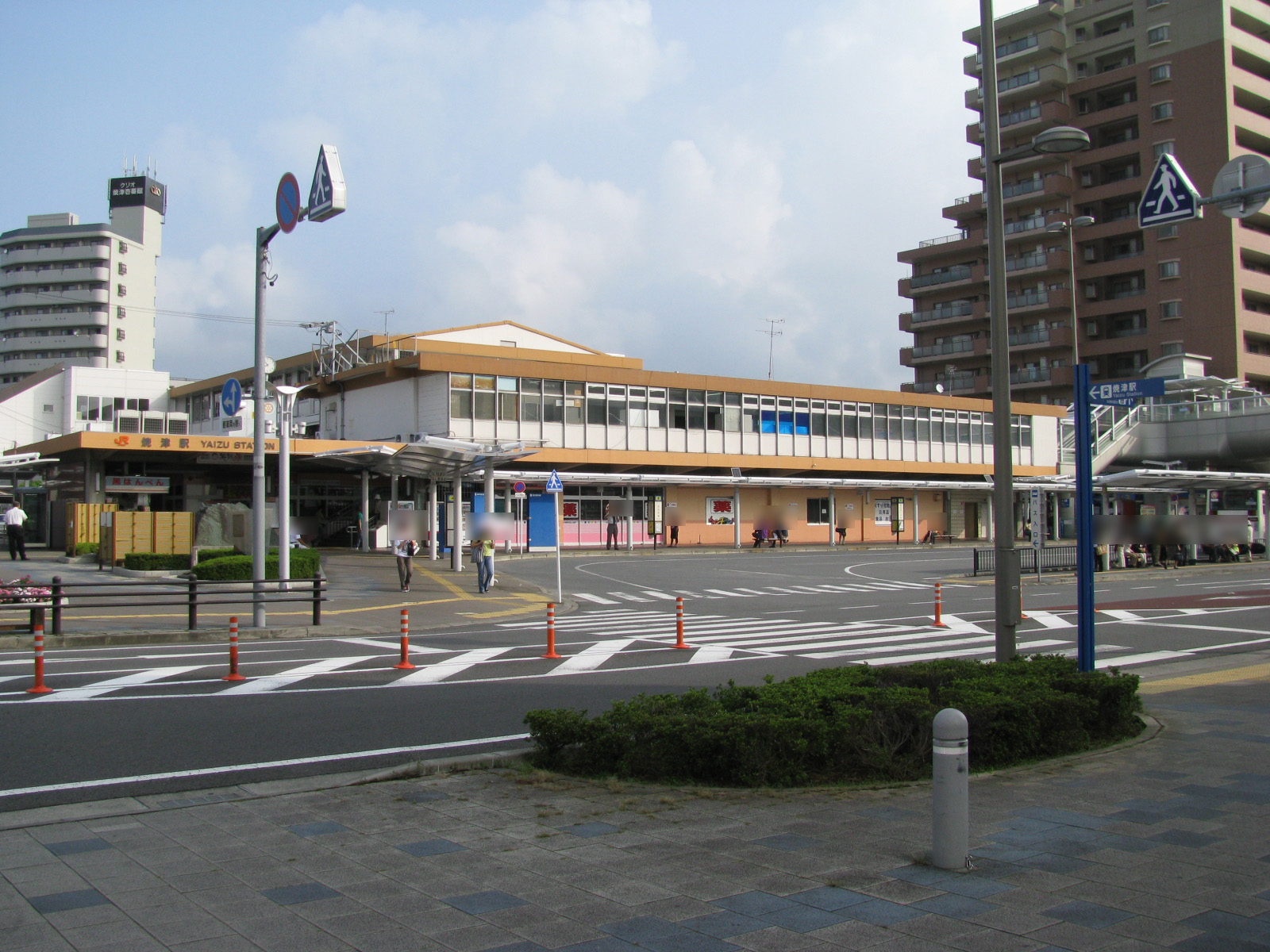
- JR Yaizu Station in 2008

General information
- Location: 1-1 Sakae, Yaizu-shi, Shizuoka-ken; Japan
- Coordinates: 34°52′20″N 138°19′4″E
- Operator: JR Central
- Line: Tokaido Main Line
- Distance: 193.7 kilometers from Tokyo
- Platforms: 1 island platform

Other information
- Status: Staffed
- Station code: CA20
- Website: Official website

History
- Opened: April 16, 1889

Passengers
- FY2017: 9,188 daily
Location
- Location within Shizuoka Prefecture Location within Japan

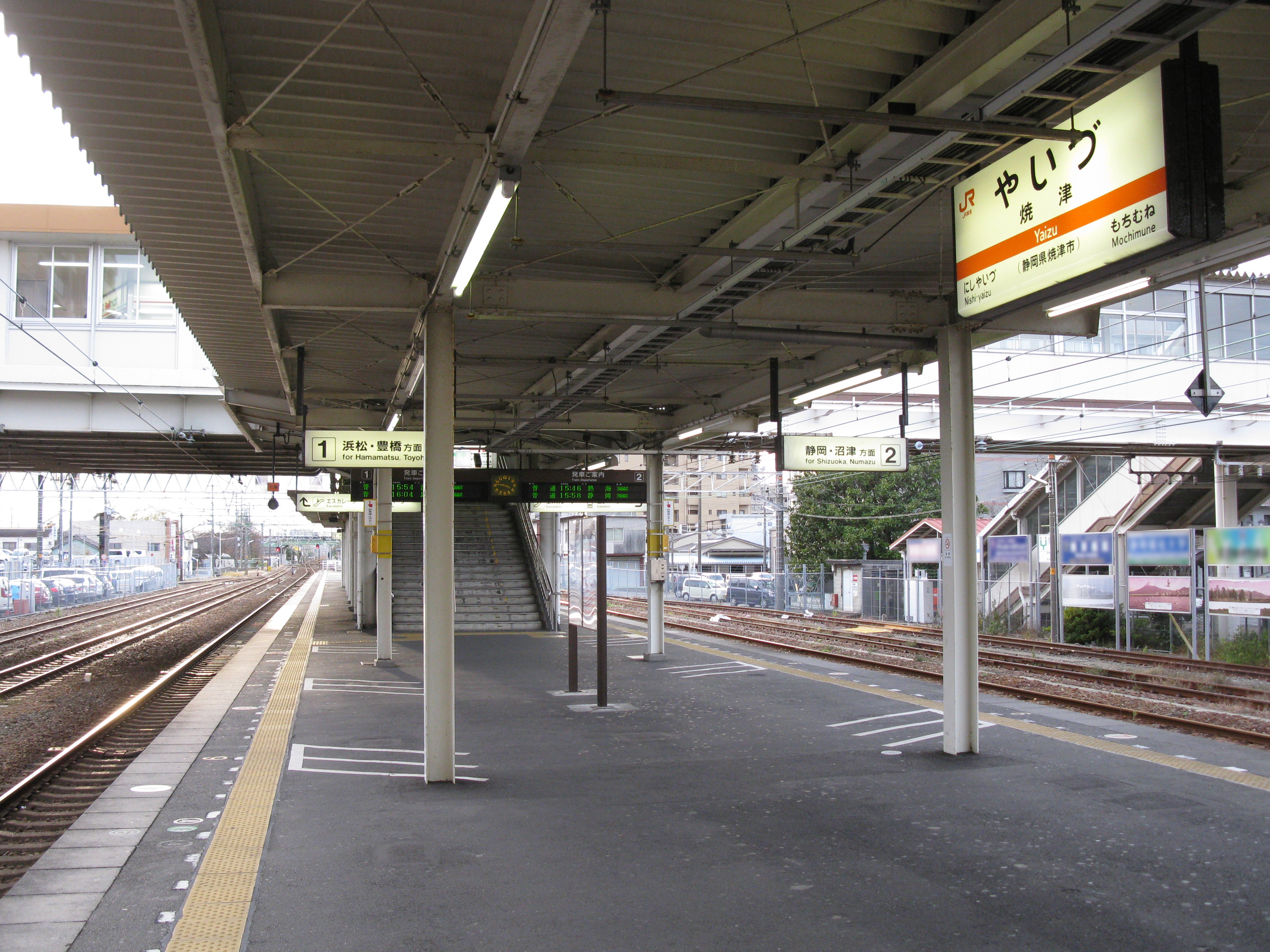
Yaizu Station platforms in December 2010

Yaizu Station (焼津駅, Yaizu-eki) is a railway station in Yaizu, Shizuoka Prefecture, Japan, operated by Central Japan Railway Company (JR Tōkai).

== Lines ==
Yaizu Station is served by the Tōkaidō Main Line, and is located 193.7 kilometers from the starting point of the line at Tokyo Station.

== Station layout ==
The station has a single island platform serving Track 1 and Track 2, connected to the station building by a footbridge. The station building has automated ticket machines, TOICA automated turnstiles and a staffed ticket office.

=== Platforms ===
1	■ Tōkaidō Main Line	For Hamamatsu, Toyohashi
2	■ Tōkaidō Main Line	For Shizuoka, Numazu

== Adjacent stations ==
«	Service	»
Central Japan Railway Company
Tōkaidō Main Line
Home Liner: Does not stop at this station
Mochimune	Local	Nishi-Yaizu

== History ==
Yaizu Station was opened on April 16, 1889 when the section of the Tōkaidō Main Line connecting Shizuoka with Hamamatsu was completed. Regularly scheduled freight service was discontinued in 1986.

Station numbering was introduced to the section of the Tōkaidō Line operated JR Central in March 2018; Yaizu Station was assigned station number CA20.

== Passenger statistics ==
In fiscal 2017, the station was used by an average of 9,188 passengers daily (boarding passengers only).

== Surrounding area ==
- Yaizu City Hall

== See also ==
- List of railway stations in Japan
