= Kusanagi Station =

Kusanagi Station (草薙駅) is the name of two train stations in Japan:

- Kusanagi Station (JR Central)
- Kusanagi Station (Shizuoka Railway)
