= Rokugō Station =

Railway station in Shimada, Shizuoka Prefecture, Japan

CA23 Rokugō Station 六合駅
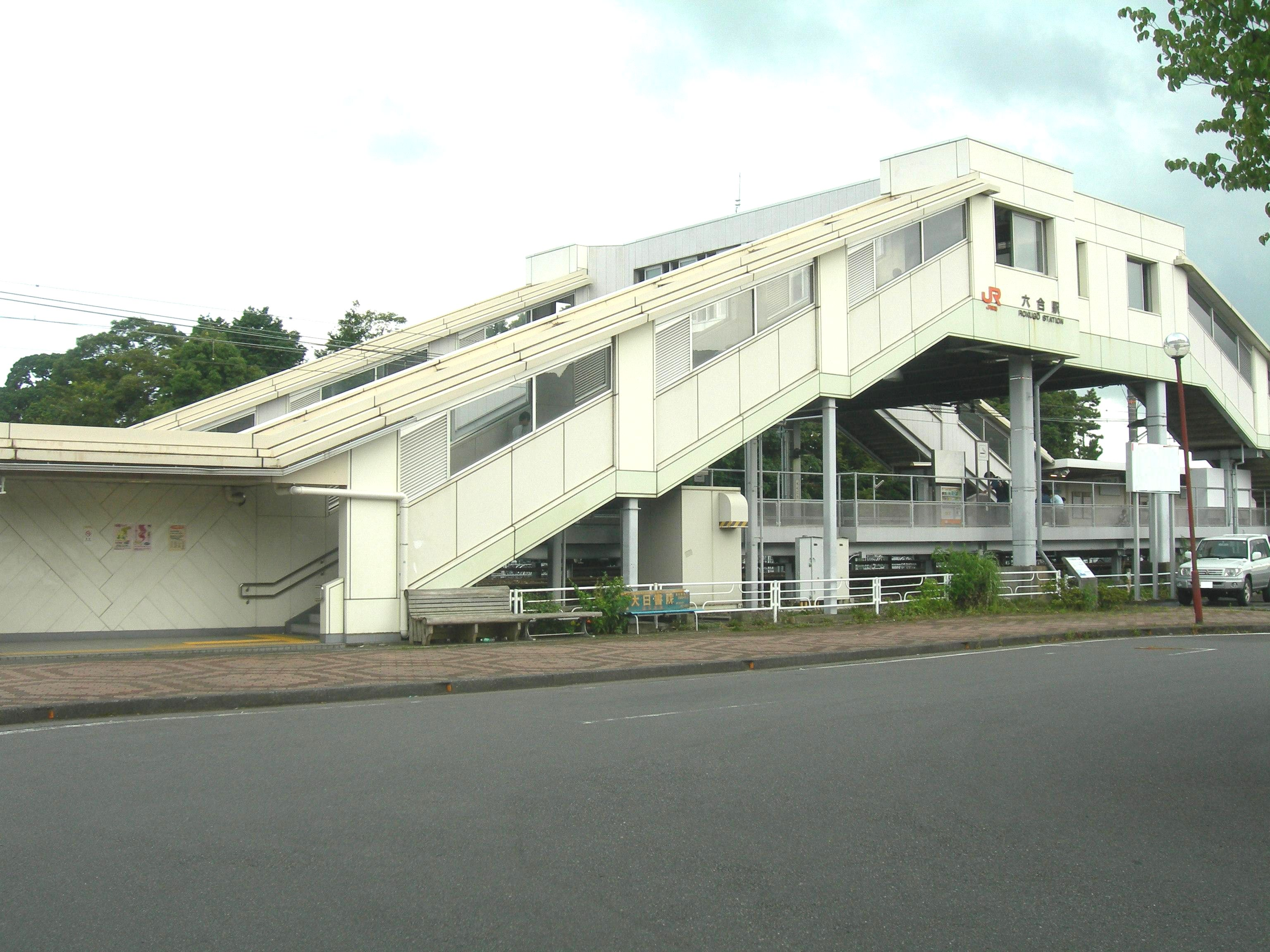
- JR Rokugō Station in 2008

General information
- Location: Doetsu 1-chome 16, Shimada-shi, Shizuoka-ken; Japan
- Coordinates: 34°50′11″N 138°12′13″E
- Operator: JR Central
- Line: Tokaido Main Line
- Distance: 204.9 kilometers from Tokyo
- Platforms: 2 side platforms

Other information
- Status: Staffed
- Website: Official website

History
- Opened: April 26, 1986

Passengers
- FY2017: 3095 daily
Location
- Location within Shizuoka Prefecture Location within Japan

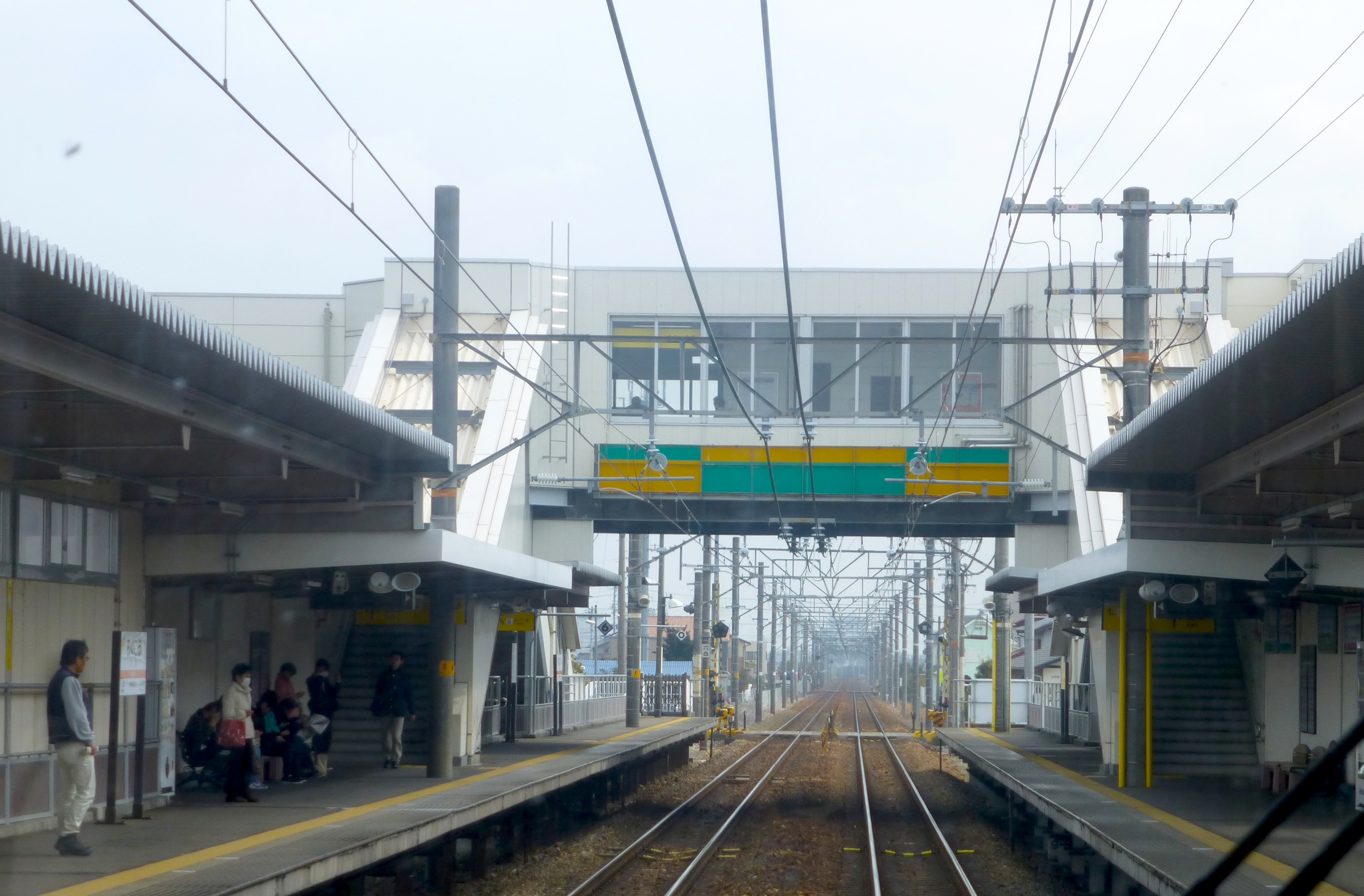
Station platforms, 2014.

Rokugō Station (六合駅, Rokugō-eki) is a railway station in Shimada, Shizuoka Prefecture, Japan, operated by Central Japan Railway Company (JR Tōkai).

== Lines ==
Rokugō Station is served by the Tōkaidō Main Line, and is located 204.9 kilometers from the starting point of the line at Tokyo Station.

== Station layout ==
The station has two opposing side platforms serving Track 1 and Track 2 which are on headshunts, allowing for tracks for express trains to pass in between. The platforms are connected by an elevated station building built over the tracks. The station building has automated ticket machines, TOICA automated turnstiles and a staffed ticket office.

=== Platforms ===
| 1 | ■ Tōkaidō Main Line | For Shizuoka, Numazu |
| 2 | ■ Tōkaidō Main Line | For Hamamatsu and Toyohashi |

== Adjacent stations ==
| « | Service | » |
Central Japan Railway Company
Tōkaidō Main Line
Commuter Rapid: Does not stop at this station
Rapid: Does not stop at this station
| Fujieda | Local | Shimada |

== Station history ==
Rokugō Station was opened on April 26, 1986 in response to requests from the local Shimada city government.

Station numbering was introduced to the section of the Tōkaidō Line operated JR Central in March 2018; Rokugō Station was assigned station number CA23.

== Passenger statistics ==
In fiscal 2017, the station was used by an average of 3095 passengers daily (boarding passengers only).

== Surrounding area ==
- Rokugō Junior High School
- Shimada Technical High School

== See also ==
- List of railway stations in Japan
