= 菊川駅 =

菊川駅 may refer to:

- Kikugawa Station
- Kikukawa Station
