= Kōmyōsan Kofun =

Kofun period burial mound in Japan

- 光明山古墳 (Japanese)
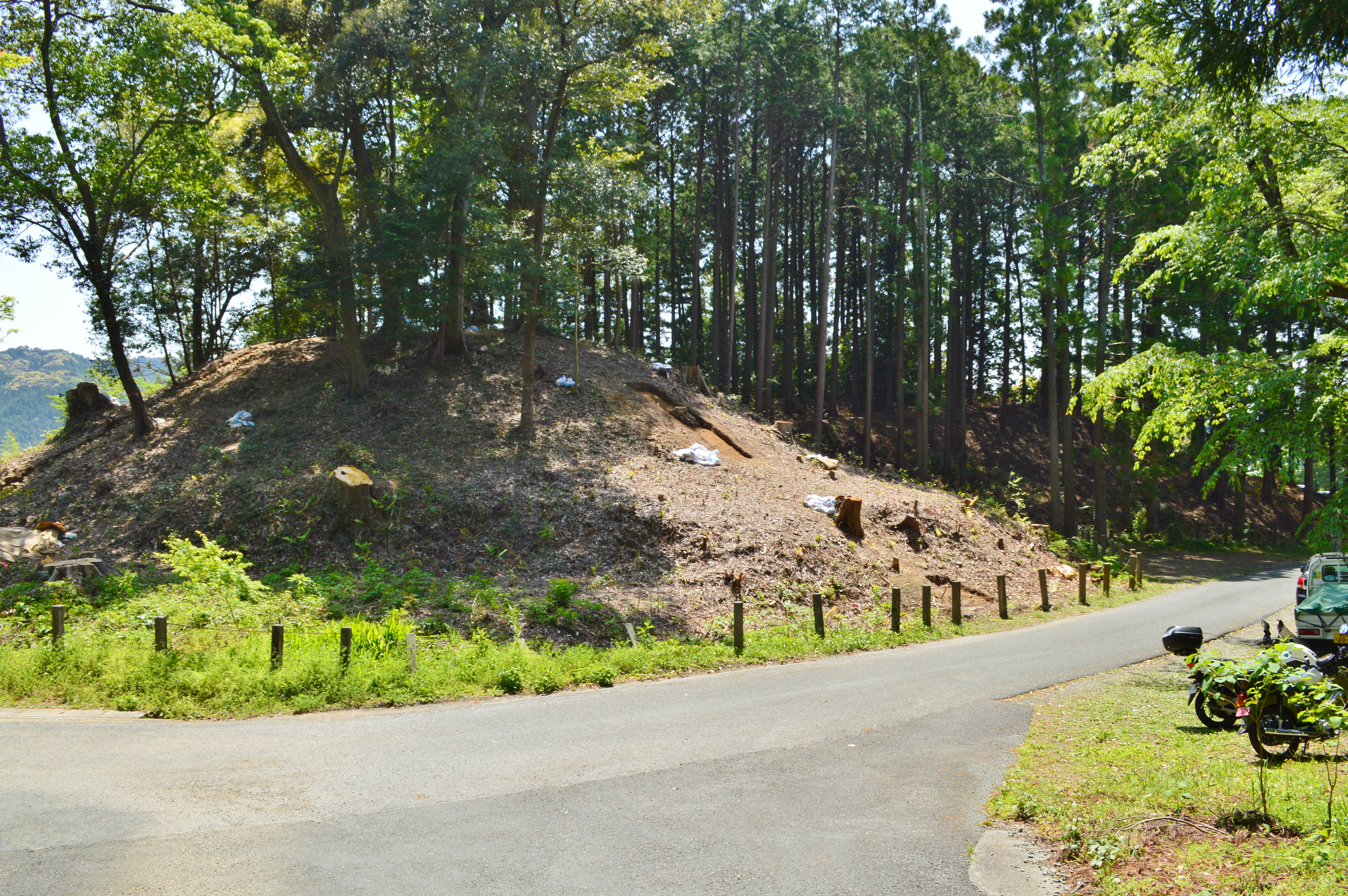
- Kōmyōsan Kofun

- Kōmyōsan Kofun Kōmyōsan Kofun (Japan)
- Interactive map of Kōmyōsan Kofun
- 34°52′27.89″N 137°49′8.79″E
- Type: kofun
- Periods: Kofun period
- Location: Tenryū-ku, Hamamatsu, Shizuoka Prefecture Japan
- Region: Chūbu region

History
- Built: 5th century AD

Site notes
- Public access: Yes (no facilities)

The Kōmyōsan Kofun (光明山古墳) is a Kofun period burial mound located in the Yamahigashi neighborhood of Tenryū-ku, Hamamatsu, Shizuoka Prefecture in the Chūbu region of Japan. The tumulus was designated a National Historic Site of Japan in 2020.

== Overview ==
The Kōmyōsan Kofun is a zenpō-kōen-fun (前方後円墳), which is shaped like a keyhole, having one square end and one circular end, when viewed from above. It is located at the tip of a tongue-shaped hill of the Tenryū River plain in western Shizuoka prefecture, and is one a group of several tumuli. The cluster is named for Kōmyō-ji, a Buddhist temple in the vicinity.

The tumulus was discovered in 1939, and was made a Shizuoka Prefectural Historic Site in 1955. An archaeological excavation was conducted from 2017 to 2018. The tumulus is orientated to the south, and has an overall length of 83 meters, making it the largest in Hamamatsu City. The anterior circular portion has a diameter of 45 meters and a height of 7.5 meters and is constructed in two tiers. Fukiishi and haniwa have been found on the surface of the mound, and the tumulus's unusual in that the fukiishi on the north side of the posterior circular portion remained in almost perfect condition with a height of about 6.8 meters from the base to the top of the mound. The burial chamber remains undiscovered, as the main body of the mound was not excavated. The construction period is estimated to be around the middle of the 5th century, or the middle of the Kofun period based on the shape of the mound and the characteristics of the haniwa.

This is the only known zenpō-kōen-fun in the Tenryū region. The Akiba Kaidō, an ancient highway connecting southern Tōtōmi with Shinano and inland reaches of Mikawa runs immediately adjacent to the tumulus. The design of the mound is common to that of the Kinki region of Japan, and it is assumed to be the tomb of a local king who controlled this transportation route, and who had some connection with the Yamato Kingdom.

The tumulus is located a ten-minute walk from the "Kōmyōguchi" bus stop on the Entetsu Bus from Hamamatsu Station.

The Kōmyōsan No.2 Kofun located to the south was am enpun (円墳)-style circular tumulus with a diameter of 33 meters, but it has now been destroyed.

== Gallery ==
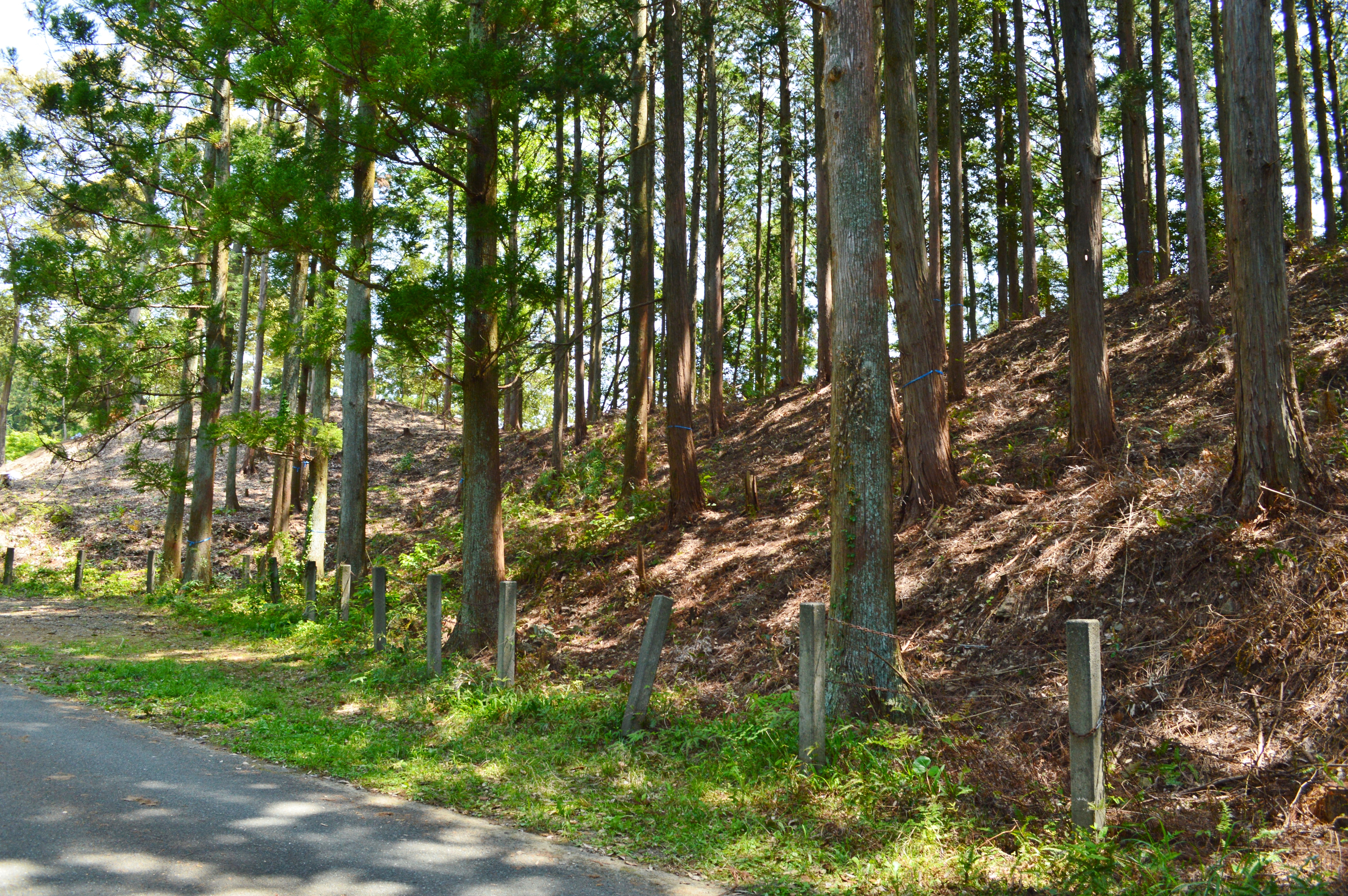
Anterior rectangular portion to right, posterior circular portion to left

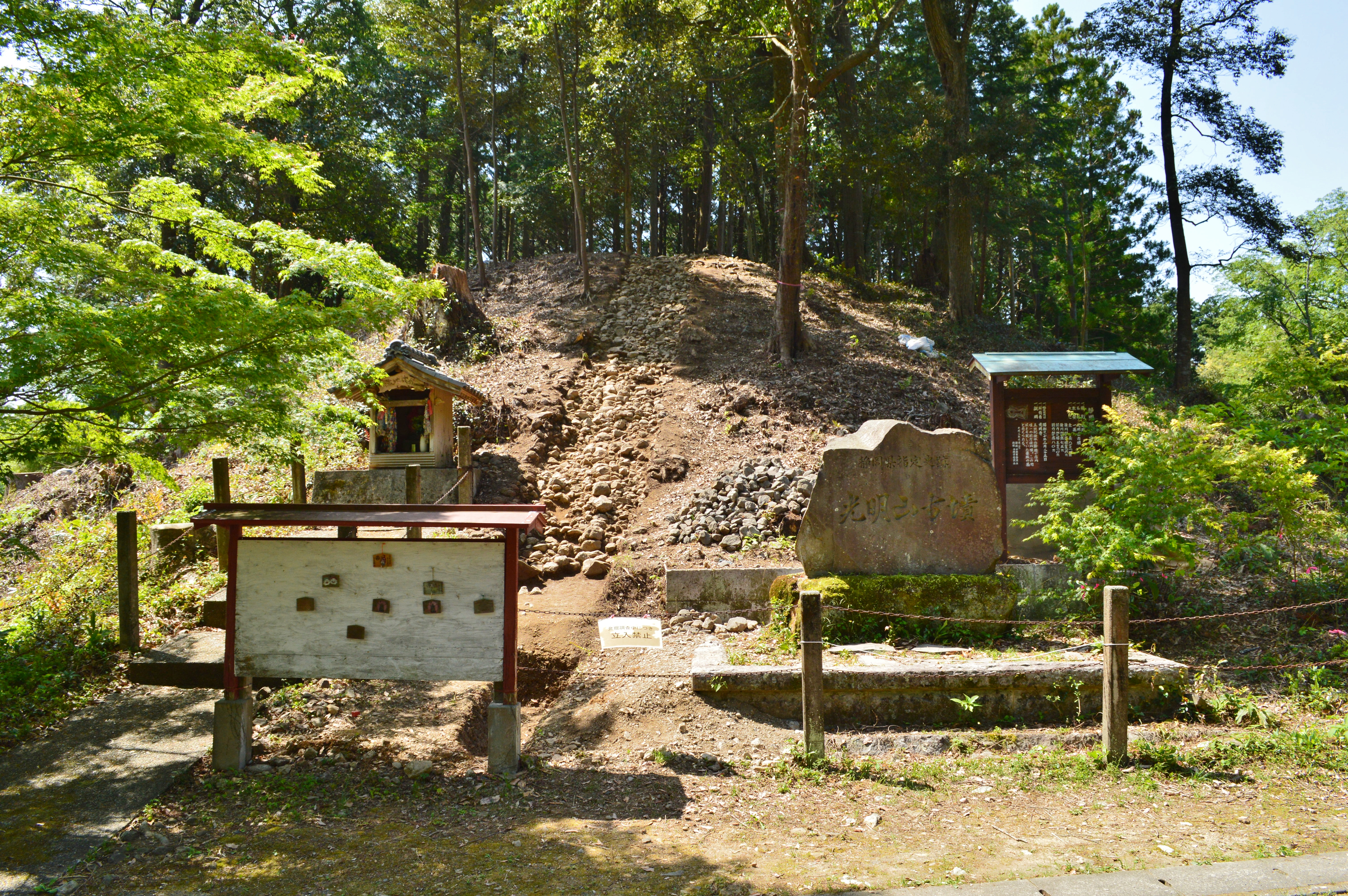
Posterior circular portion

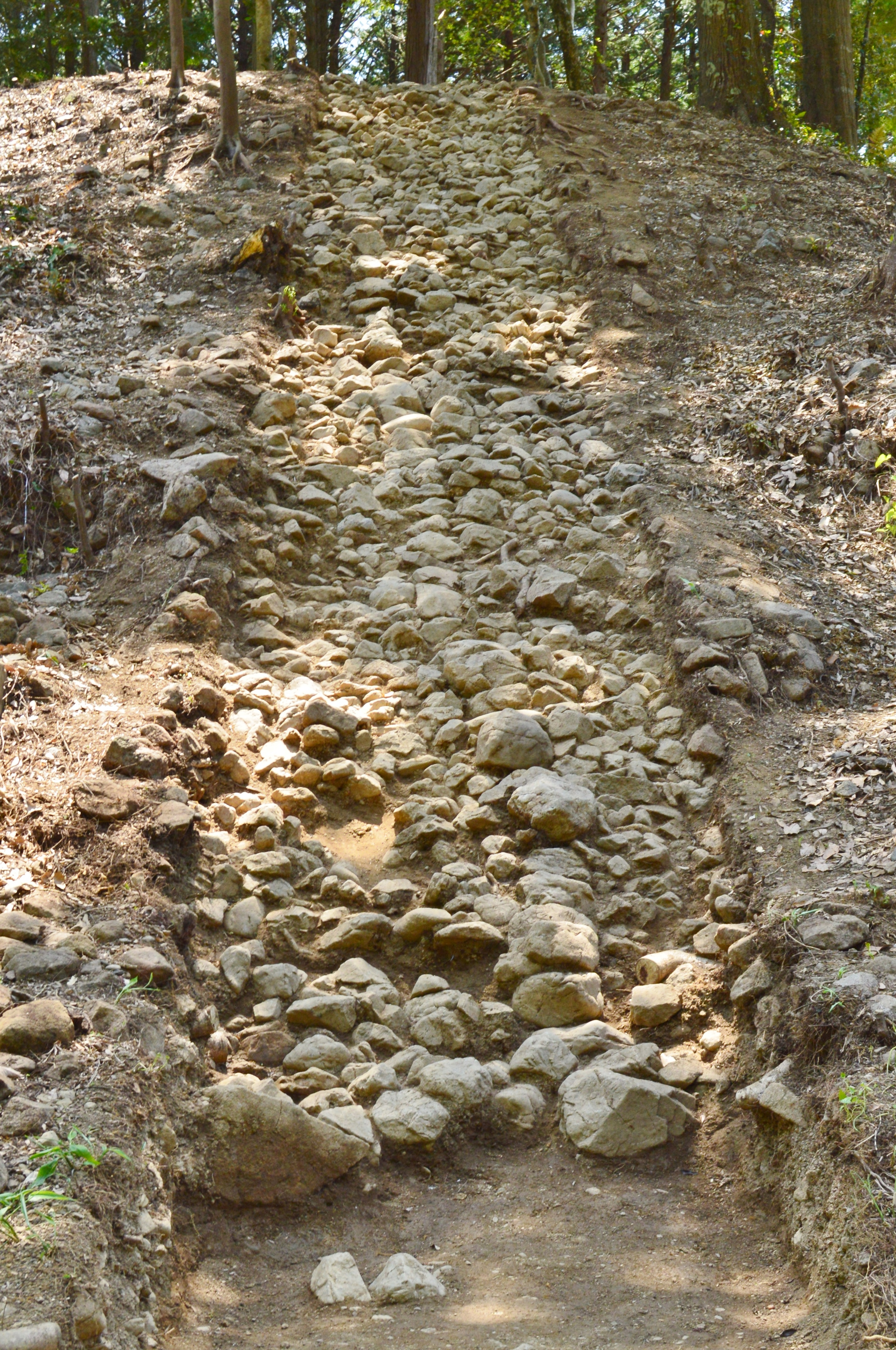
Fukiishi in situ

== See also ==
- List of Historic Sites of Japan (Shizuoka)
