= CA15 =

CA15 or CA-15 may refer to:

- CAC CA-15, an aircraft
- USS Olympia (C-6), a ship
- California State Route 15, a road
- California's 15th congressional district
- Kusanagi Station (JR Central), a Central Japan Railway Company station (station code: CA15)
