= Abekawa Station =

Railway station in Shizuoka, Japan

CA18 Abekawa Station 安倍川駅
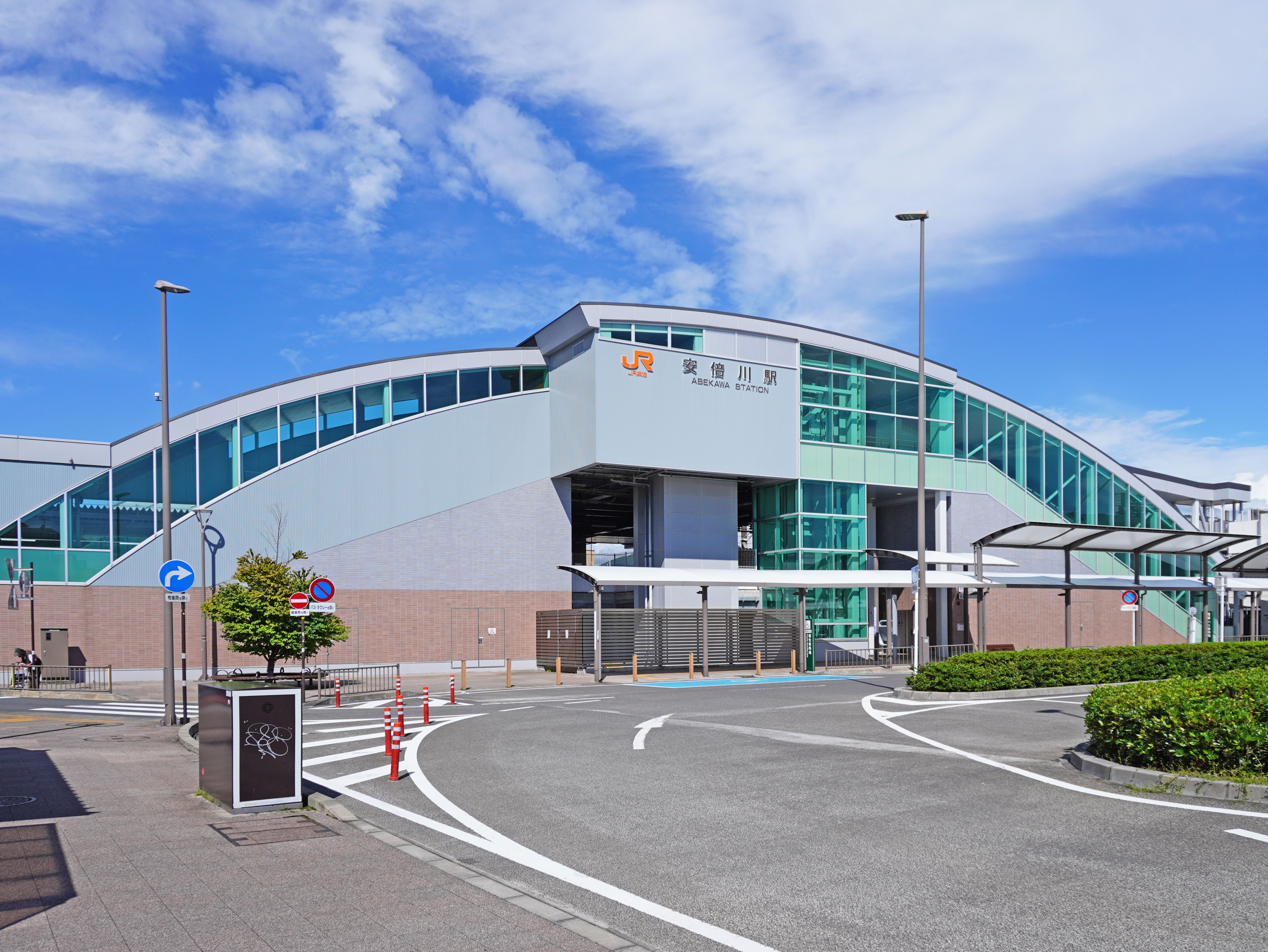
- JR Abekawa Station in September 2022

General information
- Location: Kamata, Suruga-ku, Shizuoka-shi, Shizuoka-ken; Japan
- Coordinates: 34°56′27″N 138°21′51″E
- Operator: JR Central
- Line: Tokaido Main Line
- Distance: 184.5 kilometers from Tokyo
- Platforms: 2 side platforms

Other information
- Status: Staffed
- Station code: CA18
- Website: Official website

History
- Opened: March 14, 1985

Passengers
- FY2017: 4,784 daily
Location
- Location within Shizuoka Prefecture Location within Japan

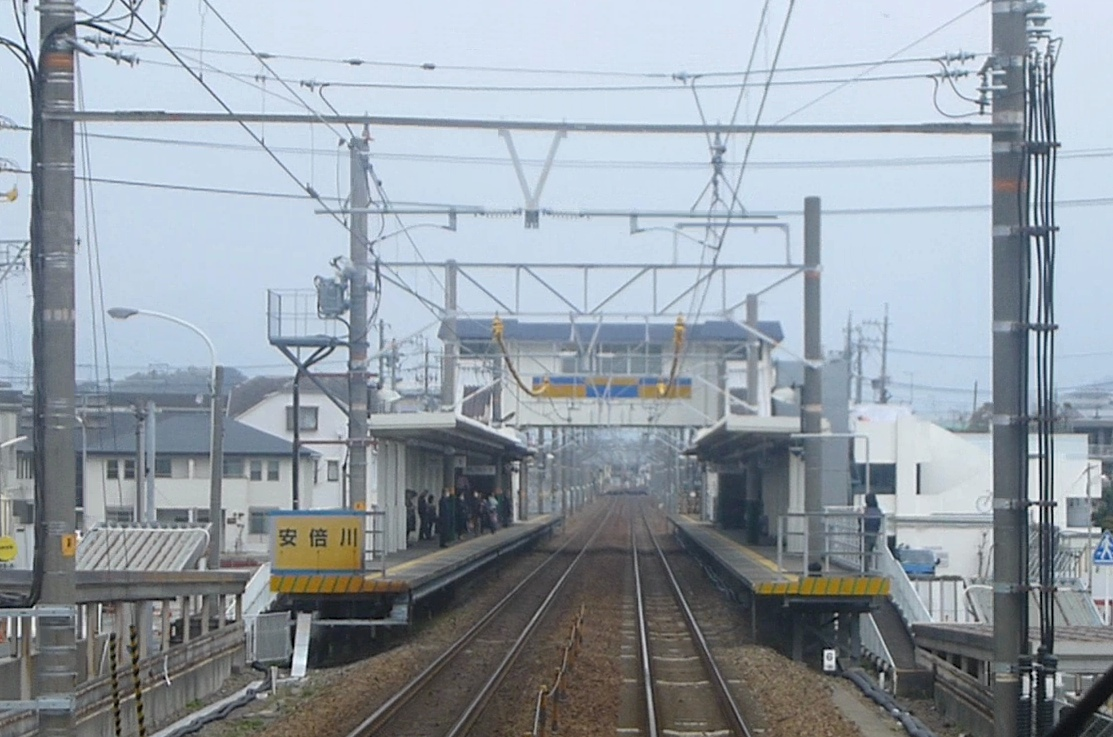
Station platforms, 2014.

Abekawa Station (安倍川駅, Abekawa-eki) is a railway station in Suruga-ku, Shizuoka City, Shizuoka Prefecture, Japan, operated by Central Japan Railway Company (JR Tōkai).

== Lines ==
Abekawa Station is served by the Tōkaidō Main Line, and is located 184.5 kilometers from the starting point of the line at Tokyo Station.

== Station layout ==
The station has two side platforms serving Track 1 and Track 2, with the station building connecting the platforms. The station building has automated ticket machines, TOICA automated turnstiles and a staffed ticket office.

=== Platforms ===
1	■ Tōkaidō Main Line	For Shimada, Hamamatsu, Toyohashi
2	■ Tōkaidō Main Line	For Shizuoka, Numazu, Atami

== Adjacent stations ==
«	Service	»
Central Japan Railway Company
Tōkaidō Main Line
Commuter Rapid: Does not stop at this station
Rapid: Does not stop at this station
Shizuoka	Local	Mochimune

== History ==
Abekawa Station was opened on March 14, 1985, primarily as a commuter station serving Shizuoka city.

Station numbering was introduced to the section of the Tōkaidō Line operated JR Central in March 2018; Abekawa Station was assigned station number CA18.

== Passenger statistics ==
In fiscal 2017, the station was used by an average of 4,784 passengers daily (boarding passengers only).

== Surrounding area ==
- Nagata Minami Junior High School
- Site of the Battle of Tegoshigawara

== See also ==
- List of railway stations in Japan
