= Nishi-Yaizu Station =

Railway station in Yaizu, Shizuoka Prefecture, Japan

CA21 Nishi-Yaizu Station 西焼津駅
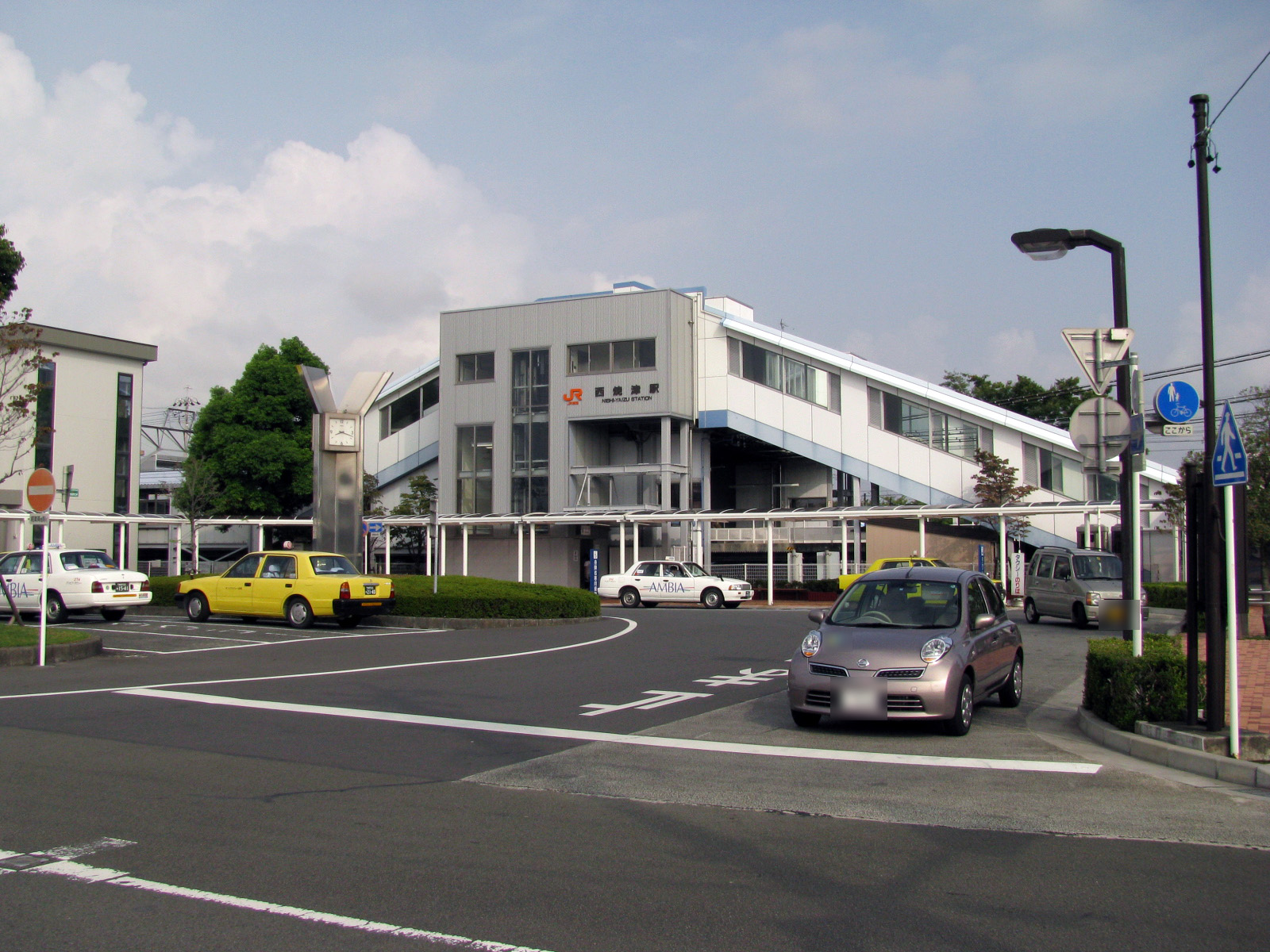
- JR Nishiyaizu Station in 2008

General information
- Location: 112-1 Koyashiki-matsubara, Yaizu-shi, Shizuoka-ken; Japan
- Coordinates: 34°51′35.38″N 138°17′8.02″E
- Operator: JR Central
- Line: Tokaido Main Line
- Distance: 197.0 kilometers from Tokyo
- Platforms: 2 side platforms

Other information
- Status: Staffed
- Website: Official website

History
- Opened: March 21, 1987

Passengers
- FY2017: 6,096 daily
Location
- Location within Shizuoka Prefecture Location within Japan

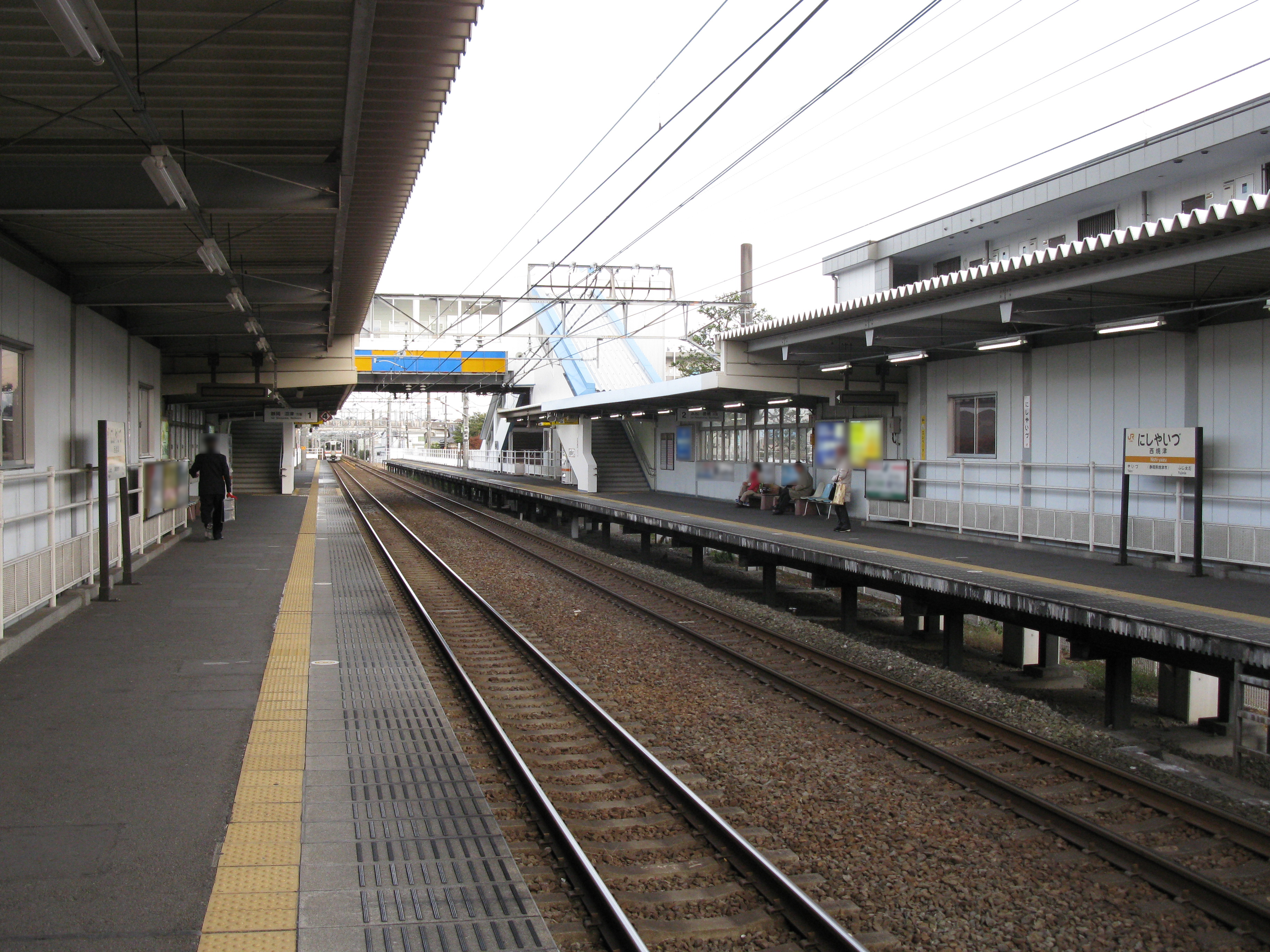
Platforms

Nishi-Yaizu Station (西焼津駅, Nishi-Yaizu-eki) is a railway station in Yaizu, Shizuoka Prefecture, Japan, operated by Central Japan Railway Company (JR Tōkai).

== Lines ==
Nishi-Yaizu Station is served by the Tōkaidō Main Line, and is located 197.0 kilometers from the starting point of the line at Tokyo Station.

== Station layout ==
The station has two opposing side platforms serving Track 1 and Track 2. The platforms are connected to the station building by an overpass. The station building has automated ticket machines, TOICA automated turnstiles and a staffed ticket office.

=== Platforms ===
1	■ Tōkaidō Main Line	For Shizuoka, Numazu
2	■ Tōkaidō Main Line	For Hamamatsu, Toyohashi

== Adjacent stations ==
«	Service	»
Central Japan Railway Company
Tōkaidō Main Line
Home Liner: Does not stop at this station
Yaizu	Local	Fujieda

== Station history ==
Nishi-Yaizu Station was opened on March 21, 1987 in response to requests from the local Yaizu city government. It is primary a commuter station, serving an industrial zone.

Station numbering was introduced to the section of the Tōkaidō Line operated JR Central in March 2018; Nishi-Yaizu Station was assigned station number CA21.

== Passenger statistics ==
In fiscal 2017, the station was used by an average of 6,096 passengers daily (boarding passengers only).

== Surrounding area ==
- Yaizu Chuo High School

== See also ==
- List of railway stations in Japan
