= Tenryūgawa Station =

Railway station in Hamamatsu, Shizuoka Prefecture, Japan

CA33 Tenryūgawa Station 天竜川駅
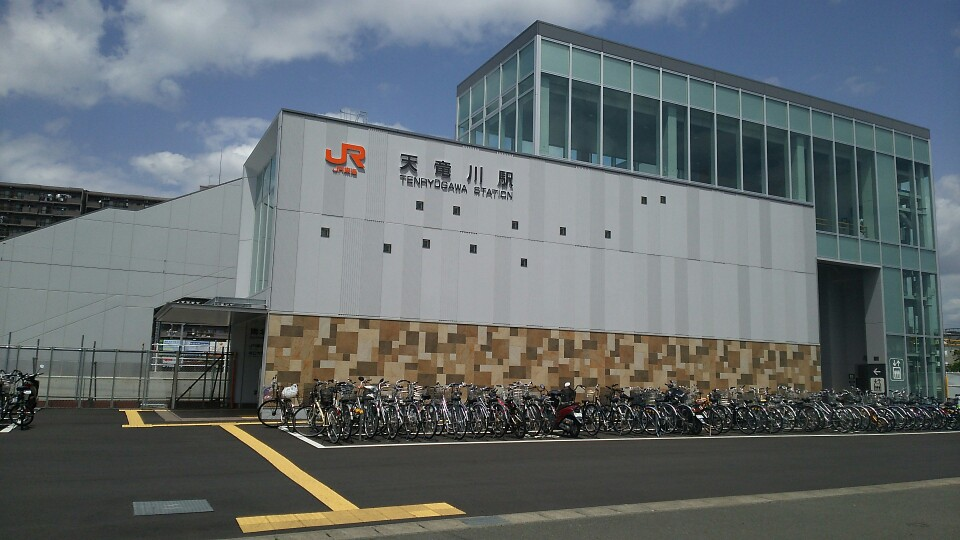
- JR Tenryūgawa Station in April 2018

General information
- Location: Tenryūgawa-chō, Chūō-ku, Hamamatsu-shi, Shizuoka-ken; Japan
- Coordinates: 34°43′02″N 137°46′45″E
- Operator: JR Central
- Line: Tokaido Main Line
- Distance: 252.7 kilometers from Tokyo
- Platforms: 2 island platforms

Other information
- Status: Staffed
- Station code: CA33

History
- Opened: July 10, 1898

Passengers
- 2023–2024: 5,688 daily
Location
- Location within Shizuoka Prefecture Location within Japan

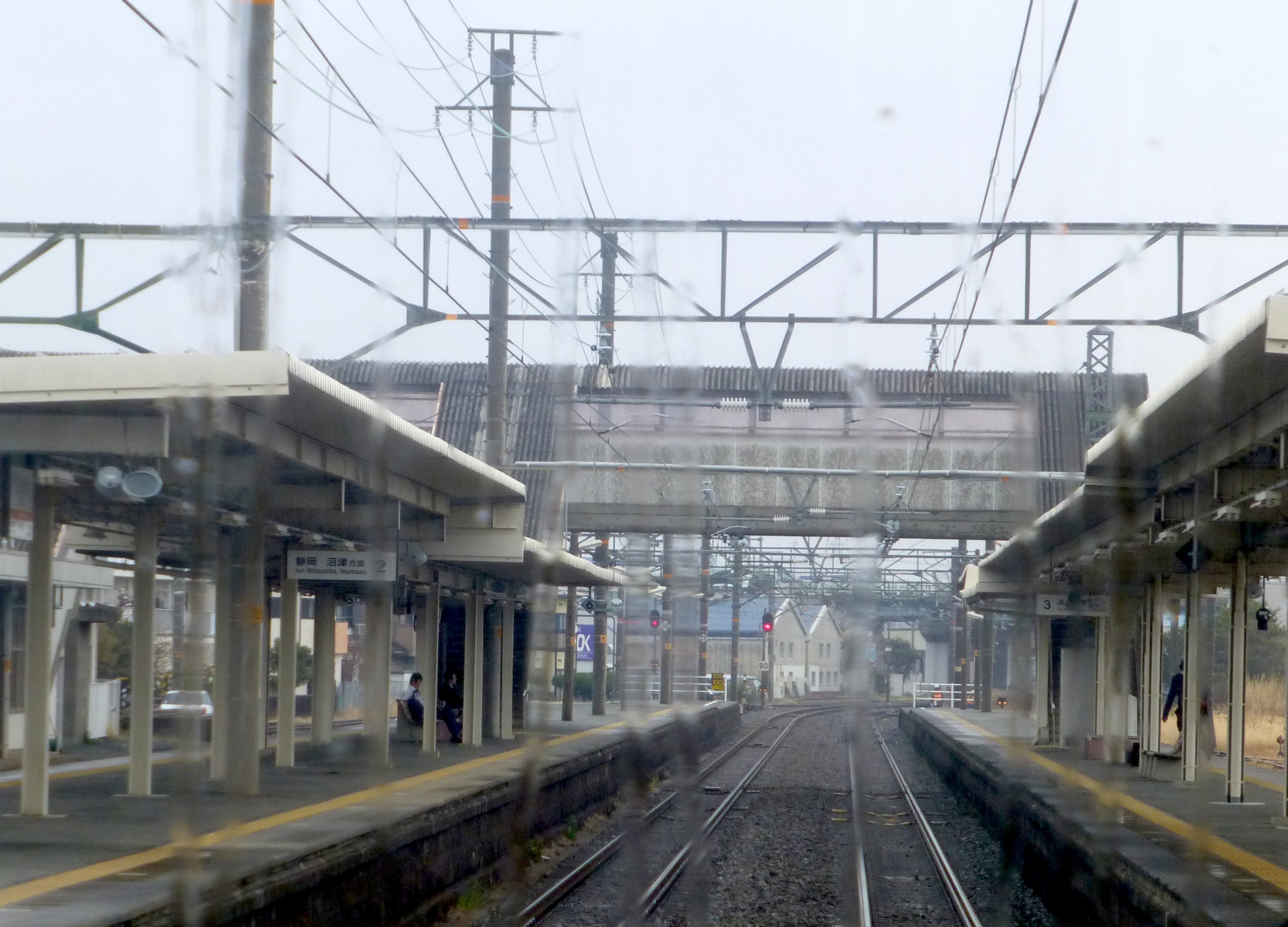
Station platforms, 2014.

Tenryūgawa Station (天竜川駅, Tenryūgawa-eki) is a railway station in Chūō-ku, Hamamatsu, Shizuoka Prefecture, Japan, operated by the Central Japan Railway Company (JR Tōkai ).

== Lines ==
Tenryūgawa Station is served by the JR Tōkai Tōkaidō Main Line, and is located 252.7 kilometers from the official starting point of the line at Tokyo.

== Station layout ==
Tenryūgawa Station has two island platforms, one serving Track 1, which is an infrequently used auxiliary platform, and Track 2. The other island platform serves Track 3, and Track 4, which is also an infrequently used auxiliary platform. The two platforms are connected by an overpass. The station building has automated ticket machines, TOICA automated turnstiles and is staffed.

=== Platforms ===
1	■ Tōkaidō Main Line	auxiliary platform
2	■ Tōkaidō Main Line	For Kakegawa, Shizuoka, Numazu
3	■ Tōkaidō Main Line	For Hamamatsu, Toyohashi
4	■ Tōkaidō Main Line	auxiliary platform

== Adjacent stations ==
«	Service	»
Central Japan Railway Company
Tōkaidō Main Line
Home Liner: Does not stop at this station
Toyodachō	Local	Hamamatsu

== History ==
Tenryūgawa Station was opened on July 10, 1898 for both passenger and freight services. Regularly scheduled freight service was discontinued on March 15, 1972; however, occasional freight trains operated by the Japan Freight Railway Company continued to use the station until April 1, 2006. A new station building was complete in September 2016.

Station numbering was introduced to the section of the Tōkaidō Line operated JR Central in March 2018; Tenryūgawa Station was assigned station number CA33.

== Passenger statistics ==
In fiscal 2017, the station was used by an average of 2783 passengers daily (boarding passengers only).

== Surrounding area ==
- Hamamatsu Arena

== See also ==
- List of railway stations in Japan
