= Kusanagi Station (JR Central) =

Railway station in Shizuoka, Japan

CA15 Kusanagi Station 草薙駅
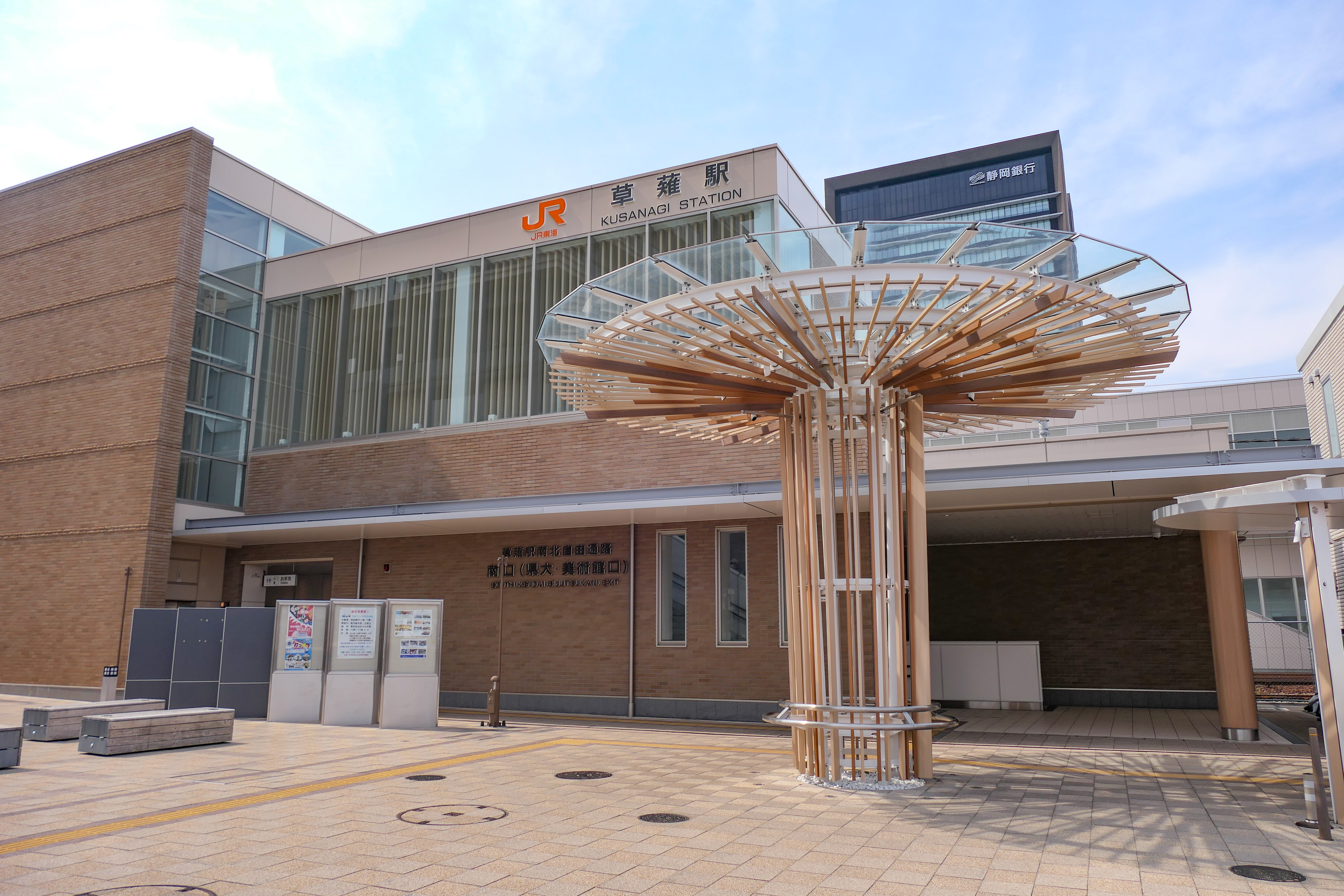
- Kusanagi Station, April 2022

General information
- Location: Kusanagi, Shimizu-ku, Shizuoka-shi, Shizuoka-ken; Japan
- Coordinates: 35.002819°N 138.441875°E
- Operator: JR Central
- Line: Tokaido Main Line
- Distance: 174.2 kilometers from Tokyo
- Platforms: 2 side platforms

Other information
- Status: Staffed
- Station code: CA15
- Website: Official website

History
- Opened: April 3, 1926

Passengers
- FY2017: 10,961 daily
Location
- Location within Shizuoka Prefecture Location within Japan

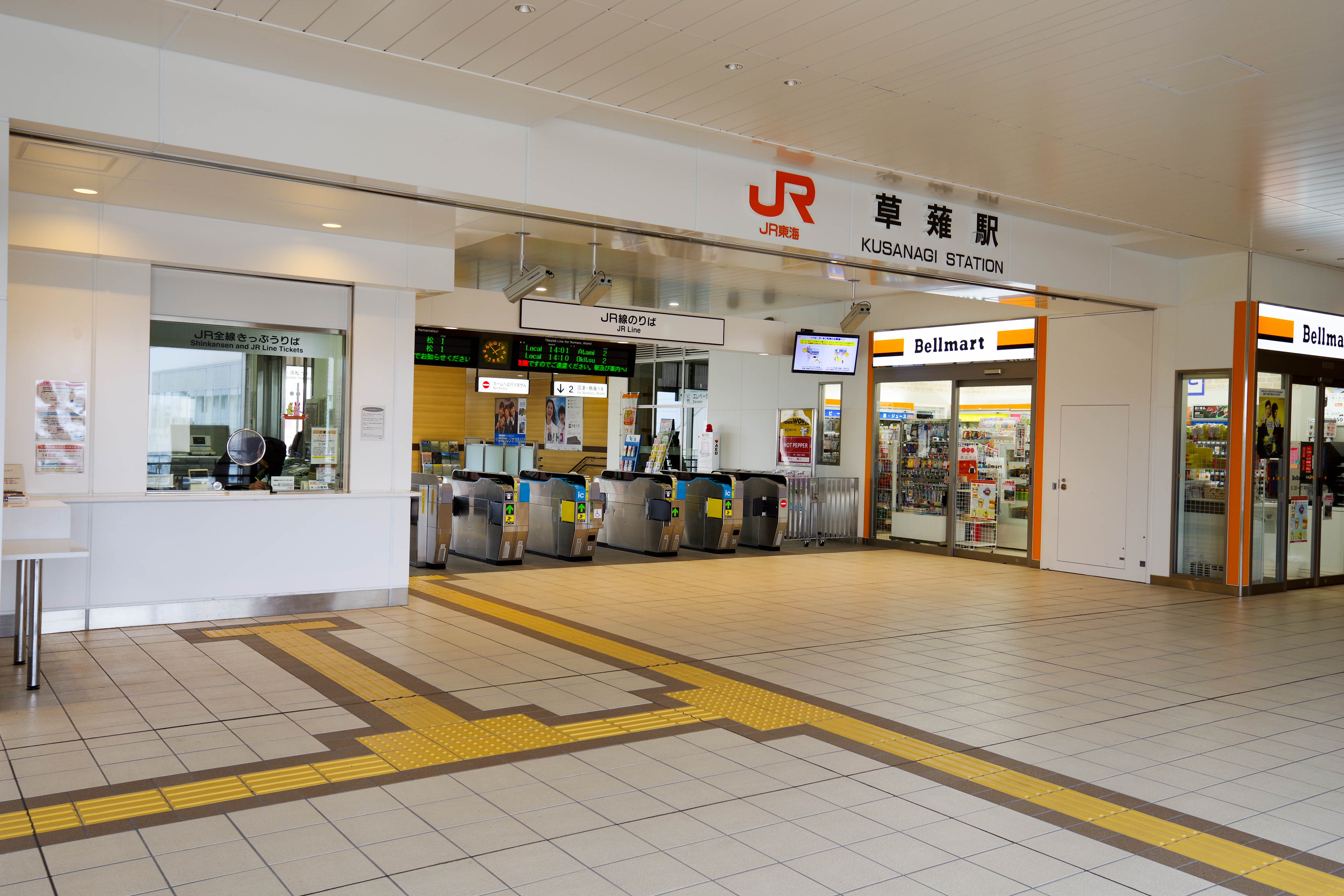
Ticket gates

Kusanagi Station (草薙駅, Kusanagi eki) is a train station in Shimizu-ku, Shizuoka City, Shizuoka Prefecture, Japan, operated by Central Japan Railway Company (JR Tōkai).

== Lines ==
Kusanagi Station is served by the Tōkaidō Main Line, and is located 174.2 kilometers from the starting point of the line at Tokyo Station.

== Station layout ==
The station has two opposing side platforms serving Track 1 and Track 2, with headshunts, allowing for tracks for express trains to pass in between, and a footbridge connecting the platforms. The station building has automated ticket machines, TOICA automated turnstiles and a staffed ticket office.

=== Platforms ===
1	■ Tōkaidō Main Line	For Shizuoka・Shimada・Kakegawa・Hamamatsu
2	■ Tōkaidō Main Line	For Shimizu・Fuji・Numazu・Mishima・Atami

== Adjacent stations ==
«	Service	»
Central Japan Railway Company
Tōkaidō Main Line
Rapid: Does not stop at this station
Commuter Rapid: Does not stop at this station
Limited Express Fujikawa: Does not stop at this station
Sleeper Limited Express Sunrise Izumo: Does not stop at this station
Sleeper Limited Express Sunrise Seto: Does not stop at this station
Shimizu	Local	Higashi-Shizuoka

== Station history ==
On April 10, 1911, a signal station was installed at the current location of Kusanagi Station, and Kusanagi Station opened on April 3, 1926.

Cargo handling, which had continued since 1930, was abolished in 1967.

The old station building was completed in 1973.

Station numbering was introduced to the section of the Tōkaidō Line operated JR Central in March 2018; Kusanagi Station was assigned station number CA15.

The current station building was completed in October 2016.

== Passenger statistics ==
In fiscal 2019, the station was used by an average of 10,961 passengers daily (boarding passengers only).

== Surrounding area ==
Kusanagi Station serves the University of Shizuoka, Shizuoka Prefectural Museum of Art and Shizuoka Prefectural Central Library. The Shizuoka-Shimizu local railway line's via Kusanagi Station is a three-minute walk away.

== See also ==
- List of railway stations in Japan
