= Kikugawa Station =

Railway station in Kikugawa, Shizuoka Prefecture, Japan

CA26 Kikugawa Station 菊川駅
- JR Kikugawa Station in 2026

General information
- Location: Horinouchi 547-9, Kikugawa-shi, Shizuoka-ken; Japan
- Coordinates: 34°45′42″N 138°5′8″E
- Operator: JR Central
- Line: Tokaido Main Line
- Distance: 222.2 kilometers from Tokyo
- Platforms: 1 side + 1 island platform

Other information
- Status: Staffed
- Station code: CA26
- Website: Official website

History
- Opened: April 16, 1889
- Former names: Horinouchi (to 1956)

Passengers
- FY2017: 4,216 daily
Location
- Location within Shizuoka Prefecture Location within Japan

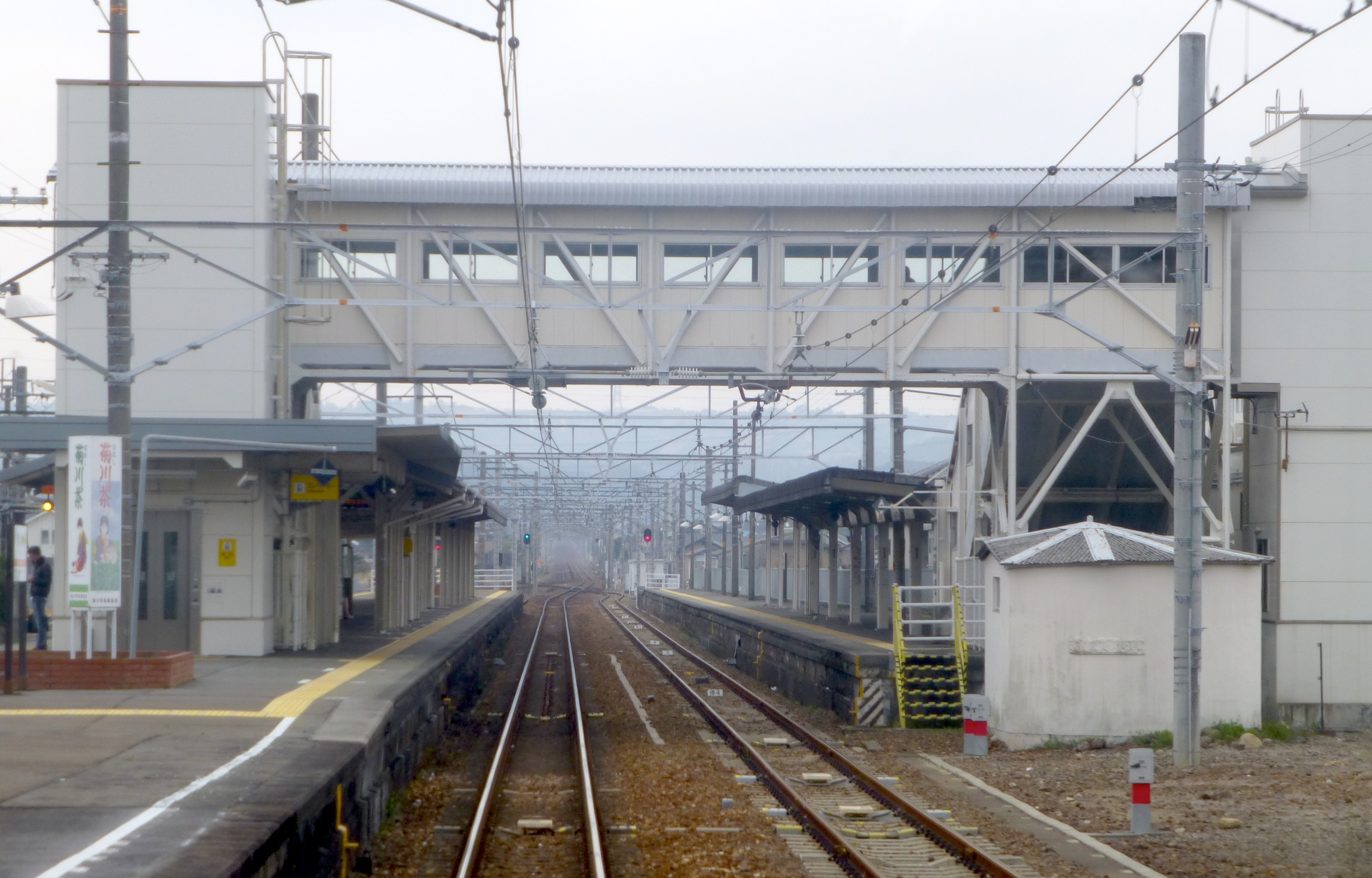
Station platforms, 2014.

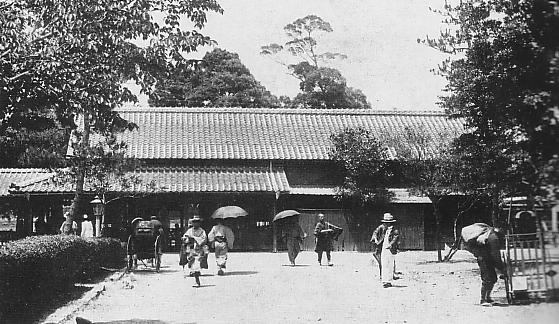
In the Taishō period

Kikugawa Station (菊川駅, Kikugawa-eki) is a railway station in the city of Kikugawa, Shizuoka Prefecture, Japan, operated by Central Japan Railway Company (JR Tōkai).

== Lines ==
Kikugawa Station is served by the Tōkaidō Main Line, and is located 222.2 kilometers from the starting point of the line at Tokyo Station.

== Station layout ==
The station has a single side platform serving Track 1 and an island platform serving Track 2 and Track 3, connected to the station building by a footbridge. Track 1 is used only during peak hours. The station building has automated ticket machines, TOICA automated turnstiles and a staffed ticket office.

=== Platforms ===
1	■ Tōkaidō Main Line	For Shimada, Shizuoka, Hamamatsu
2	■ Tōkaidō Main Line	For Hamamatsu
3	■ Tōkaidō Main Line	For Shimada, Shizuoka

== Adjacent stations ==
«	Service	»
Central Japan Railway Company
Tōkaidō Main Line
Shimada	Home Liner	Kakegawa
Kanaya	Local	Kakegawa

== Station history ==
Kikugawa Station was opened on April 16, 1889, when the section of the Tōkaidō Main Line connecting Shizuoka with Hamamatsu was completed. It was originally named Horinouchi Station (堀ノ内駅, Horinouchi-eki). It was renamed Kikugawa on April 10, 1956. Regularly scheduled freight service was discontinued in 1971.

Station numbering was introduced to the section of the Tōkaidō Line operated JR Central in March 2018; Kikugawa Station was assigned station number CA26.

== Passenger statistics ==
In fiscal 2017, the station was used by an average of 4,216 passengers daily (boarding passengers only).

== Surrounding area ==
- Kikugawa City Hall

== See also ==
- List of railway stations in Japan
