= Fujieda Station =

Railway station in Fujieda, Shizuoka Prefecture, Japan

CA22 Fujieda Station 藤枝駅
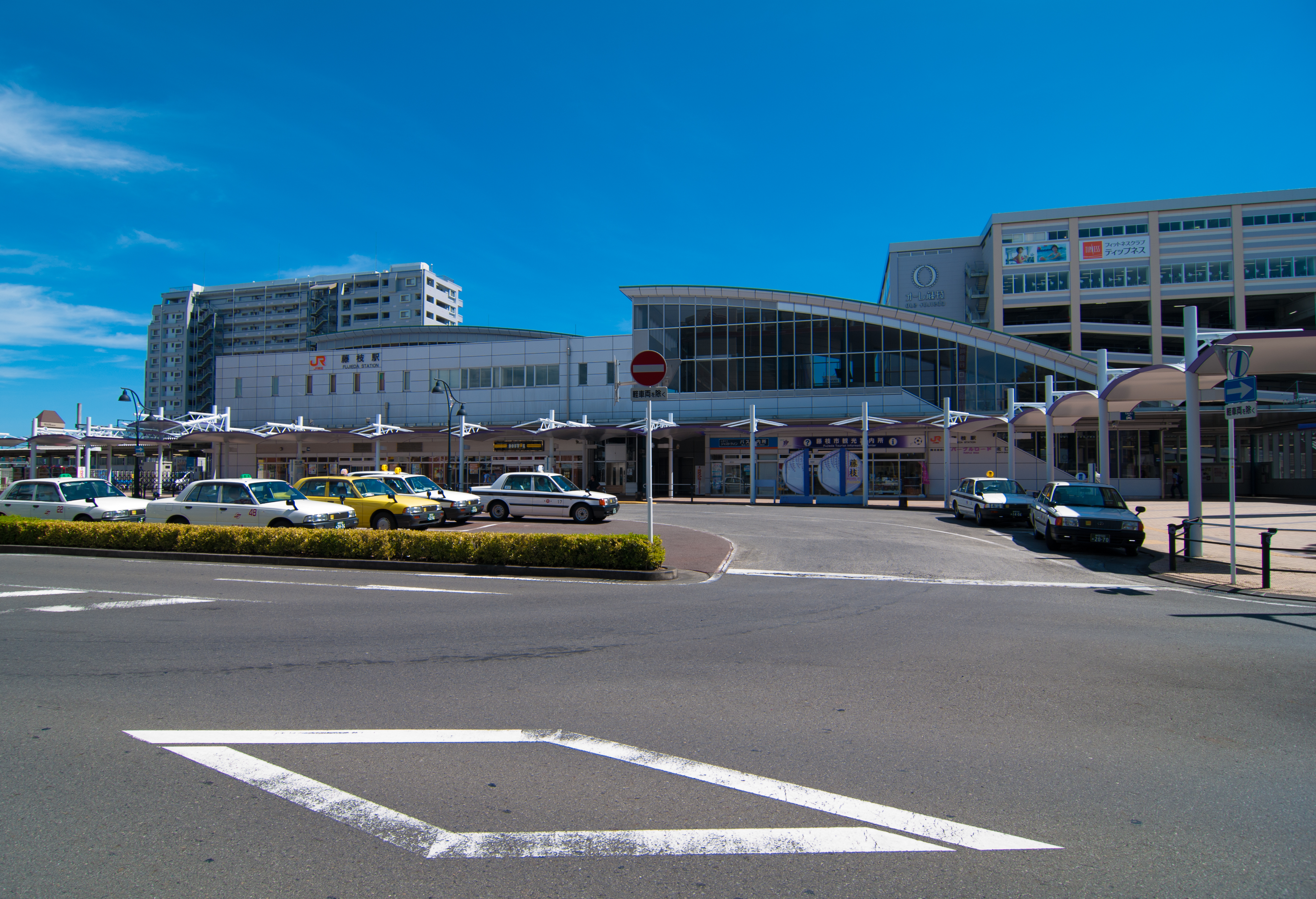
- JR Fujieda Station in August 2010

General information
- Location: Ekimae 1-chome 1, Fujieda-shi, Shizuoka-ken; Shizuoka Prefecture; Japan
- Coordinates: 34°50′58″N 138°15′9″E
- Operator: JR Central
- Line: Tokaido Main Line
- Distance: 200.3 kilometers from Tokyo
- Platforms: 1 side + 1 island platform
- Tracks: 2

Construction
- Structure type: Ground level

Other information
- Status: Staffed ( "Midori no Madoguchi")
- Website: Official website

History
- Opened: April 16, 1889

Passengers
- FY2017: 11,362 daily
Location
- Location within Shizuoka Prefecture Location within Japan

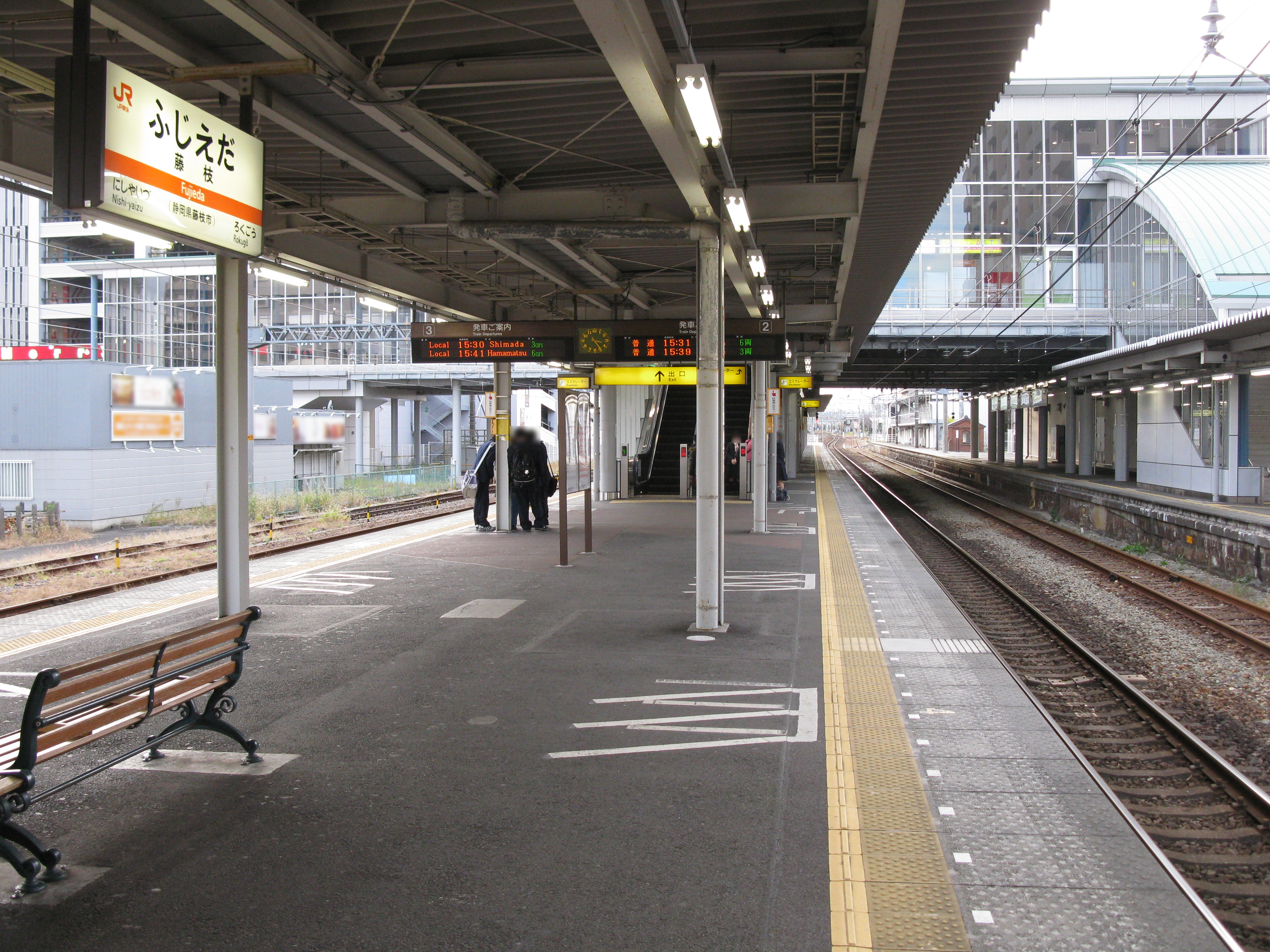
Fujieda Station platforms in December 2010

Fujieda Station (藤枝駅, Fujieda-eki) is a railway station in Fujieda, Shizuoka Prefecture, Japan, operated by Central Japan Railway Company (JR Tōkai).

== Lines ==
Fujieda Station is served by the Tōkaidō Main Line, and is located 200.3 kilometers from the starting point of the line at Tokyo Station.

== Station layout ==
Fujieda Station has an island platform serving Track 2 and Track 3, and a side platform serving the seldom-used Track 1. The platforms are connected to the station building by an elevated station concourse. The station building has automated ticket machines, TOICA automated turnstiles and a staffed "Midori no Madoguchi" service counter.

=== Platforms ===
| 1 | ■ Tōkaidō Main Line | auxiliary platform |
| 2 | ■ Tōkaidō Main Line | For Shizuoka, Numazu |
| 3 | ■ Tōkaidō Main Line | For Shimada, Hamamatsu |

== Adjacent stations ==
| « | Service | » |
Central Japan Railway Company
Tōkaidō Main Line
| Shizuoka | Home Liner | Shimada |
| Nishi-Yaizu | Local | Rokugo |

== History ==
Fujieda Station was opened on April 16, 1889 when the section of the Tōkaidō Main Line connecting Shizuoka with Hamamatsu was completed. The city of Fujieda did not exist at that time, and the station was located in Aoshima Village. On April 27, 1889, a senior official of the Imperial Household Ministry, Hida Hamagoro was killed while attempting to jump onto a departing express train from the platform of Fujieda Station. At the time, trains on the Tōkaidō Main Line had no toilets, and the accident led to their introduction on May 10 of the same year. Fujieda became an interchange station with the establishment of services by the Sunen Line (駿遠線, Sunen-sen) (the future Shizuoka Railway Company) on November 16, 1913, and which opened a spur line to Ōigawa Town in 1914. Operations of the Shizuoka Railway were discontinued at Fujieda on October 1, 1970. Regularly scheduled freight service was discontinued in 1971.

Station numbering was introduced to the section of the Tōkaidō Line operated JR Central in March 2018; Fujieda Station was assigned station number CA22.

== Passenger statistics ==
In fiscal 2017, the station was used by an average of 11,362 passengers daily (boarding passengers only).

== Surrounding area ==
- Fujieda City Hall

== See also ==
- List of railway stations in Japan
