= Shimada Station =

Railway station in Shimada, Shizuoka Prefecture, Japan

CA24 Shimada Station 島田駅
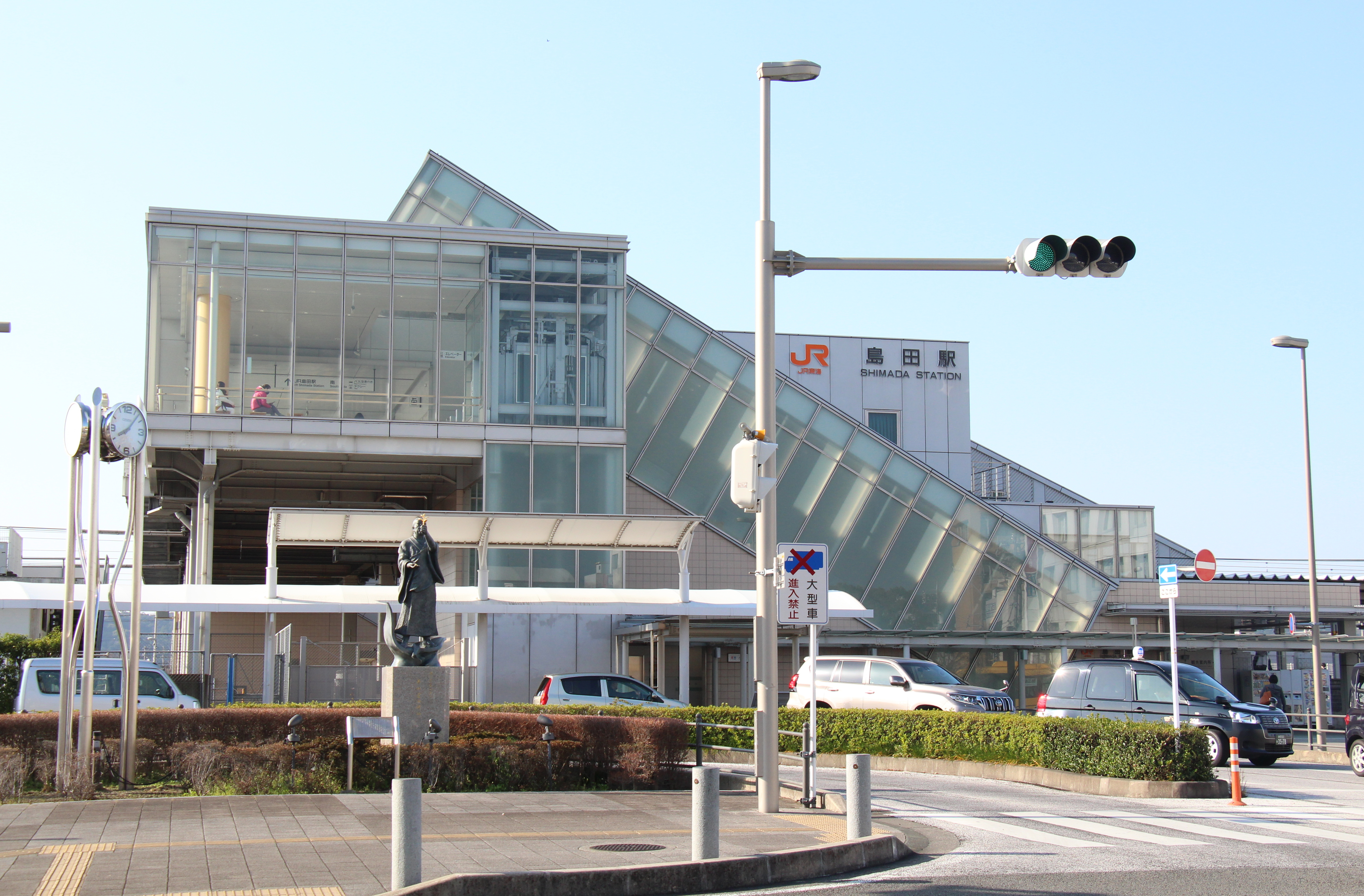
- JR Shimada Station in 2020

General information
- Location: Hinode-chō 4788, Shimada-shi, Shizuoka-ken; Japan
- Coordinates: 34°49′49″N 138°10′27″E
- Operator: JR Central; JR Freight
- Line: Tokaido Main Line
- Distance: 207.8 kilometers from Tokyo
- Platforms: 2 side platforms

Other information
- Status: Staffed
- Station code: CA24
- Website: Official website

History
- Opened: April 16, 1889

Passengers
- FY2017: 5,534 daily
Location
- Location within Shizuoka Prefecture Location within Japan

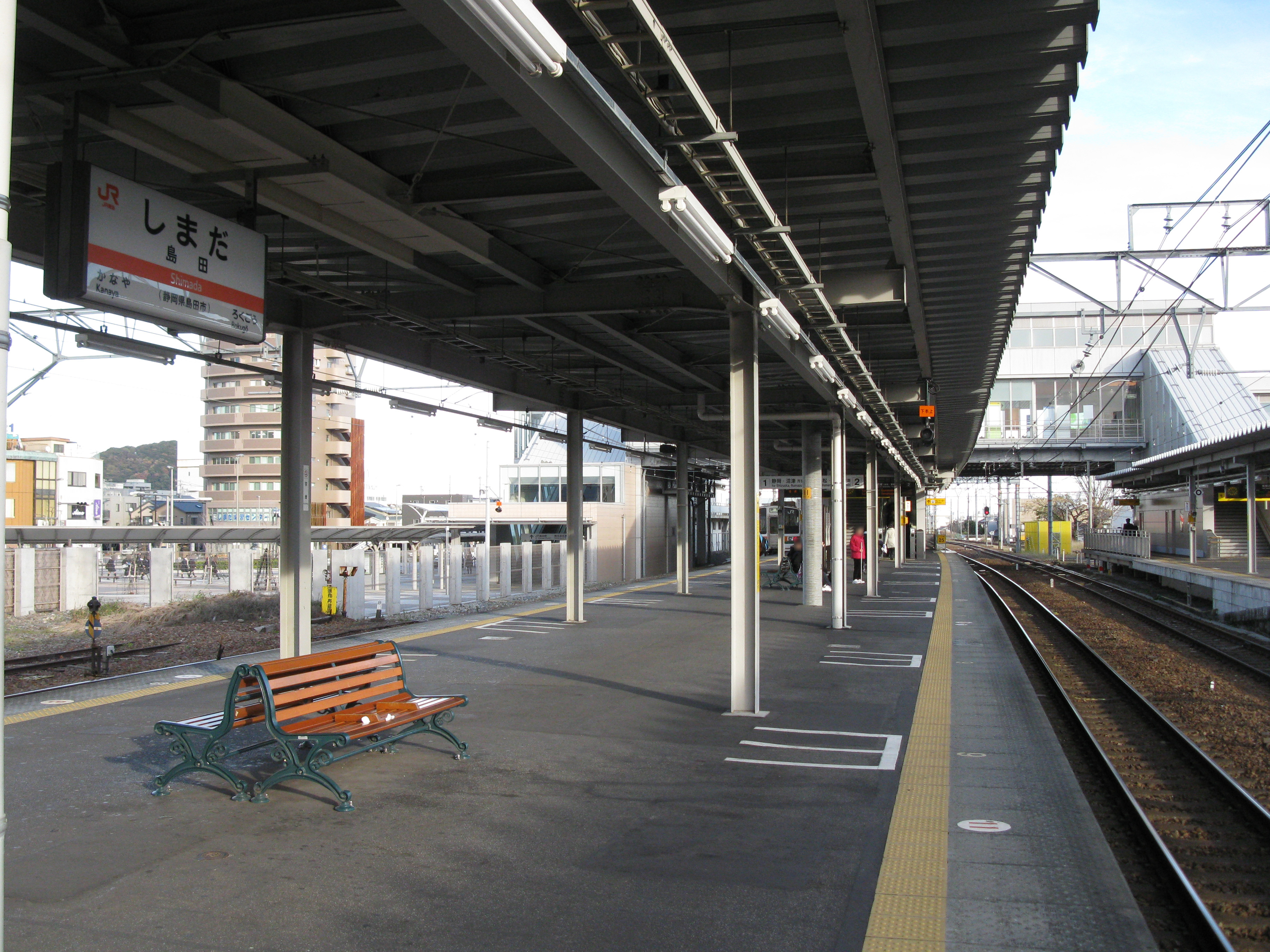
Shimada Station platforms in December 2010

Shimada Station (島田駅, Shimada-eki) is a railway station in the city of Shimada, Shizuoka Prefecture, Japan, operated by Central Japan Railway Company (JR Tōkai). The station is also a freight depot for the Japan Freight Railway Company (JR Freight).

== Lines ==
Shimada Station is served by the Tōkaidō Main Line, and is located 207.8 kilometers from the starting point of the line at Tokyo Station.

== Station layout ==
The station has an island platform serving Track 1 and Track 2, and a side platform serving the seldom-used Track 3. The platforms are connected to the station building by an overpass. The station building has automated ticket machines, TOICA automated turnstiles and a staffed ticket office.

=== Platforms ===
1	■ Tōkaidō Main Line	For Shizuoka, Numazu
2	■ Tōkaidō Main Line	For Hamamatsu, Toyohashi
3	■ Tōkaidō Main Line	auxiliary platform

== Adjacent stations ==
«	Service	»
Central Japan Railway Company
Tōkaidō Main Line
Fujieda	Home Liner	Kikugawa
Rokugo	Local	Kanaya

== Station history ==
Shimada Station was opened on April 16, 1889 when the section of the Tōkaidō Main Line connecting Shizuoka with Hamamatsu was completed. Regularly scheduled freight service was discontinued in 1984, but continued on a charter service until 1993.

Station numbering was introduced to the section of the Tōkaidō Line operated JR Central in March 2018; Shimada Station was assigned station number CA24.

== Passenger statistics ==
In fiscal 2017, the station was used by an average of 5534 passengers daily (boarding passengers only).

== Surrounding area ==
- Shimada City Hall
- Oi Jinja

== See also ==
- List of railway stations in Japan
