= Shizuoka Station =

Railway station in Shizuoka, Japan

Coordinates: 34°58′18″N 138°23′20″E

CA17 Shizuoka Station 静岡
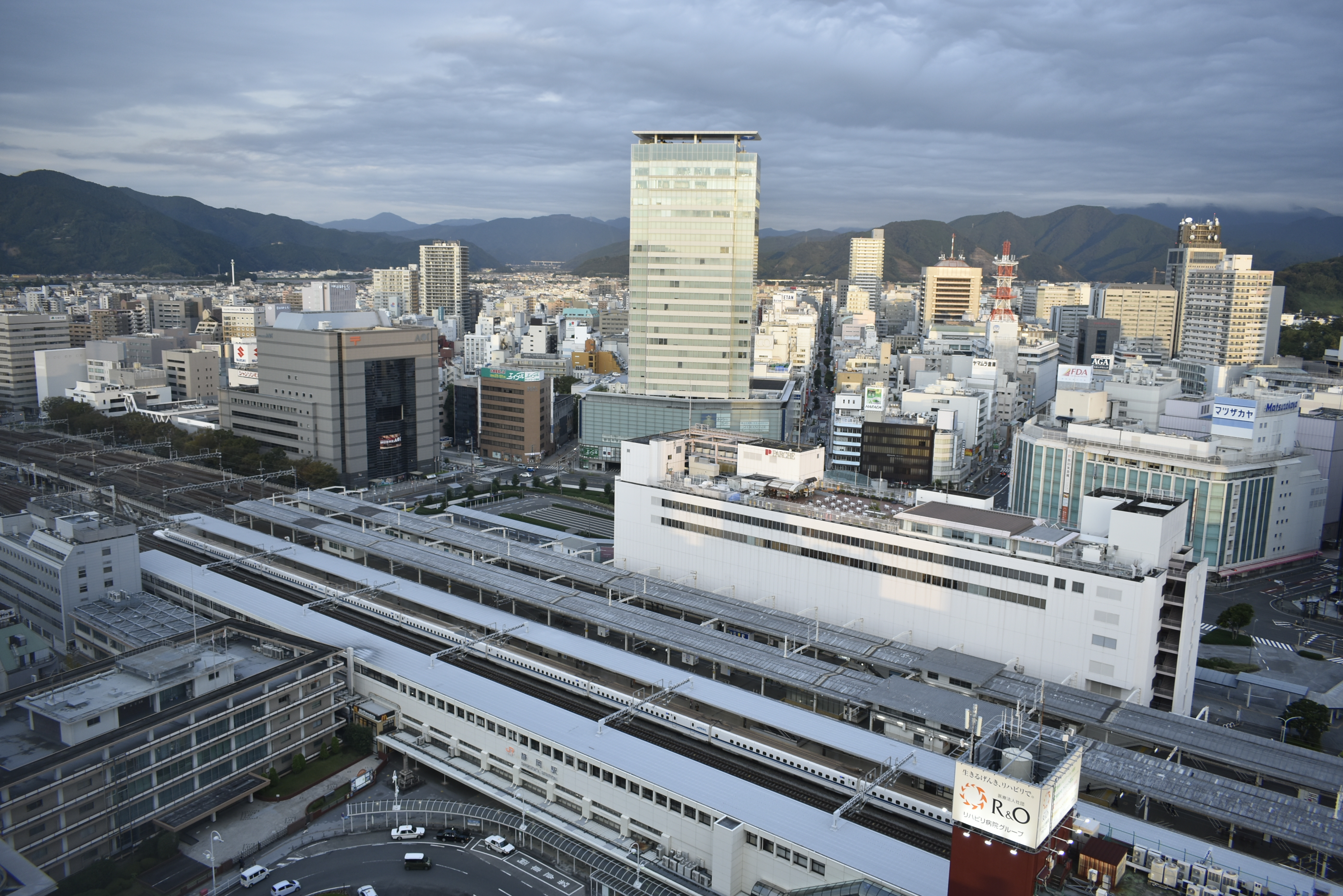
- Shizuoka Station north side

Japanese name
- Shinjitai: 静岡駅
- Kyūjitai: 靜岡驛
- Hiragana: しずおかえき

General information
- Location: 50 Kurogane-chō, Aoi Ward, Shizuoka City; Shizuoka Prefecture; Japan
- Operator: JR Central
- Lines: Tokaido Shinkansen; Tōkaidō Main Line
- Platforms: 2 side platforms (Shinkansen), 2 island platforms (Conventional lines)
- Tracks: 2 Shinkansen, 4 conventional
- Connections: Bus terminal

Construction
- Structure type: Elevated

Other information
- Station code: CA17

History
- Opened: 1 February 1889; 137 years ago

Passengers
- FY 2023: 107,931 daily (Total); 38,989 daily (Shinkansen)

Services
Preceding station	JR Central	Following station
Hamamatsu towards Shin-Ōsaka	Tokaido Shinkansen Hikari	Mishima towards Tokyo
Kakegawa towards Shin-Ōsaka	Tokaido Shinkansen Kodama	Shin-Fuji towards Tokyo
Location
- Location within Shizuoka Prefecture Location within Central Japan Location within Japan

Shizuoka Station (静岡駅, Shizuoka-eki) is a railway station in Shizuoka, Shizuoka Prefecture, Japan, operated by the Central Japan Railway Company (JR Central).

== Brief description ==
Shizuoka Station is served by the Tōkaidō Shinkansen and Tōkaidō Main Line, and is 180.2 rail km from Tokyo.

Shizuoka Station is the biggest station in Shizuoka prefecture, 60,000 people use this station per day.

All trains including the sleeper limited express Sunrise Seto and Sunrise Izumo stop here, and it is the starting and ending point of the limited express Fujikawa.

== Station layout ==
Shizuoka Station has four platforms serving six tracks. Two island platforms with Tracks 1–4 serve the Tōkaidō Main Line trains, and long-distance night trains. These platforms are connected with the station concourse via an underpass and are also connected at the same level to the Tōkaidō Shinkansen platforms. The Shinkansen station consists of two opposing side platforms serving two tracks, with two central tracks for non-stop trains. The station building has automated ticket machines, TOICA automated turnstiles, and a crewed "Green Window" service counter.

=== Platforms ===
1	■ Tōkaidō Main Line	for Numazu and Atami
1	■ Sleeping Car trains	for Ōsaka, Shikoku, and Chugoku
2	■ Tōkaidō Main Line	for Numazu and Atami
2	■ Limited Express Fujikawa	for Minobu and Kōfu
2	■ Sleeping Car trains	for Ōsaka, Shikoku, Chugoku
3,4	■ Tōkaidō Main Line	for Hamamatsu and Toyohashi
5	■ Tōkaidō Shinkansen	for Mishima and Tokyo
6	■ Tōkaidō Shinkansen	for Shin-Ōsaka and Hakata

== Adjacent stations ==
«	Service	»
Tōkaidō Main Line CA17
Fuji CA08	Sleeper Limited Express Sunrise Seto & Sunrise Izumo	Hamamatsu CA34 (westbound); Osaka (JR-A47) (eastbound)
Shimizu CA14	Limited Express Fujikawa	Terminus
Shimizu CA14	Home Liner	Fujieda CA22
Higashi-Shizuoka CA16	Local	Abekawa CA18

== History ==
Shizuoka station first opened on February 1, 1889, when the section of the Tōkaidō Main Line connecting Shizuoka with Kōzu was completed. A grand opening ceremony had been planned, but on this day a huge fire destroyed over 1,000 buildings in downtown Shizuoka. Railroad Minister Inoue Masaru cancelled his planned visit, and later the same day, the town around Gotemba Station, also in Shizuoka Prefecture, burned down. The initial Shizuoka Station building was rebuilt in 1907 and again in 1935. The Tōkaidō Shinkansen platforms were opened in 1964. In 1967, freight operations were relocated from Shizuoka Station to Higashi-Shizuoka Station (the present-day Shizuoka Freight Terminal). The station underwent a massive rebuilding program from the late 1970s, with the Tōkaidō Main Line tracks elevated in 1979 to the same level as the Tōkaidō Shinkansen tracks, and the Parche shopping centre/new station building completed in 1981. From 2006 to 2008, major renovations took place inside and around the station, including the underground walkways to and from the station, and the Asty shopping and dining complexes adjoined to the station.

Station numbering was introduced to the section of the Tōkaidō Line operated JR Central in March 2018; Shizuoka Station was assigned station number CA17.
