= Hamamatsu Station =

Railway station in Hamamatsu, Japan

CA34 Hamamatsu Station 浜松駅
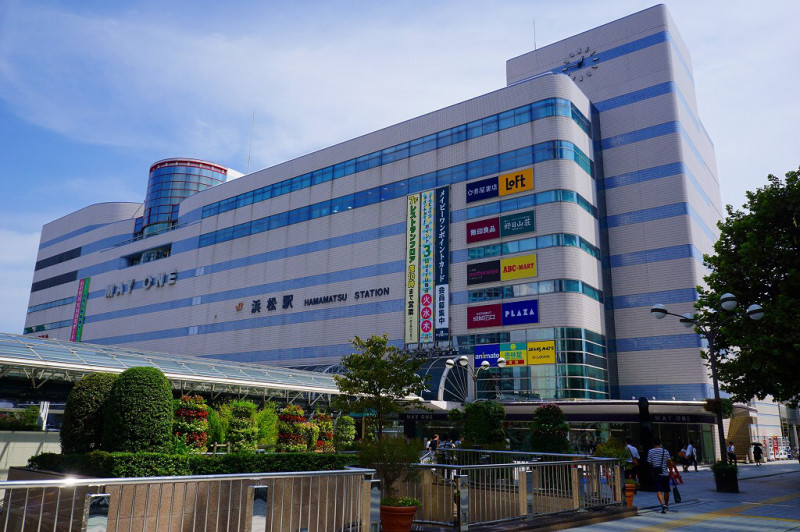
- The northern side of Hamamatsu Station in 2018

Japanese name
- Shinjitai: 浜松駅
- Kyūjitai: 濱松驛
- Hiragana: はままつえき

General information
- Location: 6-2 Sunayama-chō, Chūō-ku, Hamamatsu City; Shizuoka Prefecture; Japan
- Coordinates: 34°42′13″N 137°44′04″E
- Operator: JR Central
- Lines: Tōkaidō Shinkansen; Tōkaidō Main Line
- Platforms: 2 side platforms (Shinkansen); 2 island platforms (conventional lines)
- Tracks: 2 Shinkansen, 4 Conventional
- Connections: Bus terminal

Construction
- Structure type: Elevated

History
- Opened: 1 September 1888; 137 years ago
- Rebuilt: 1926, 1948

Passengers
- FY 2023: 67,270 daily (Total); 24,925 daily (Shinkansen)

Services
Preceding station	JR Central	Following station
Toyohashi towards Shin-Ōsaka	Tōkaidō Shinkansen Hikari	Shizuoka towards Tokyo
Toyohashi towards Shin-Ōsaka	Tōkaidō Shinkansen Kodama	Kakegawa towards Tokyo

Other services
Preceding station	JR Central	Following station
Terminus	Tōkaidō Main Line Home liner	Iwata CA31 towards Atami
Takatsuka CA35 towards Maibara	Tōkaidō Main Line Special Rapid New Rapid	Terminus
Takatsuka CA35 towards Maibara	Tōkaidō Main Line Local	Tenryūgawa CA33 towards Atami
Location
- Location within Shizuoka Prefecture Location within Central Japan Location within Japan

Hamamatsu Station (Japanese: 浜松駅, Hepburn: Hamamatsu-eki) is a railway station on the Tōkaidō Main Line and the Tōkaidō Shinkansen in Hamamatsu, Shizuoka, Japan, operated by the Central Japan Railway Company (JR Central). The local Enshū Railway Line terminus of Shin-Hamamatsu Station is three minutes' walking distance away.

== Lines ==
Hamamatsu Station is served by the Tōkaidō Main Line and the high-speed Tōkaidō Shinkansen from Tokyo. The station is 257.1 kilometers from Tokyo Station.

== Station layout ==
Hamamatsu Station has two island platforms serving Tracks 1-4 for the Tōkaidō Main Line, which are connected by an underpass a central concourse. At the same level as the Shinkansen tracks are the two island platforms serving Tracks 5 and 6 of the Tōkaidō Shinkansen. The station building has automated ticket machines, TOICA automated turnstiles and a staffed "Midori no Madoguchi" ticket office.

=== Platforms ===
1	■ Tōkaidō Main Line	for Kakegawa and Shizuoka
2	■ Tōkaidō Main Line	for Kakegawa and Shizuoka
3	■ Tōkaidō Main Line	for Toyohashi and Nagoya
4	■ Tōkaidō Main Line	for Toyohashi and Nagoya
5	■ Tōkaidō Shinkansen	for Shin-Yokohama and Tokyo
6	■ Tōkaidō Shinkansen	for Nagoya, Shin-Osaka, and Okayama

== History ==
Hamamatsu Station was officially opened on September 1, 1888. The station building was rebuilt in 1926, but this burned down during the bombing of Hamamatsu in World War II. The station was rebuilt in 1948. On October 1, 1964, the Tōkaidō Shinkansen began operations, serving Hamamatsu. Freight operations were relocated to the Nishi-Hamamatsu Freight Depot to the west in 1971. The station underwent a massive rebuilding program from the late 1970s, with the Tōkaidō Main Line tracks elevated in 1979 to the same level as the Tōkaidō Shinkansen tracks, and the "MayOne" shopping centre/new station building completed in 1981.

Station numbering was introduced to the section of the Tōkaidō Line operated JR Central in March 2018; Hamamatsu Station was assigned station number CA34.

== See also ==
- List of railway stations in Japan
