= Aimi =

Aimi may refer to:

- Aimi, Tottori, a former town in Saihaku District, Tottori Prefecture, Japan
- Aimi Station, a railway station in Kōta, Aichi Prefecture, Japan

== People with the surname ==
- Aldo Aimi (1906–1980), Italian footballer

== People with the given name ==
- Aimi (actress) (愛美; born 1991), Japanese voice actress and singer
- Aimi Ito (伊藤 亜衣美; born 1983), Japanese handball player
- Aimi Kawashima (川島 亜依美; born 1990), Japanese volleyball player
- Aimi Kobayashi (小林 愛実; born 1995), Japanese pianist
- Aimi Kobayashi (field hockey) (小林 愛実; born 1998), Japanese field hockey player
- Aimi Kunitake (國武 愛美; born 1997), Japanese women's footballer
- Aimi MacDonald (born 1942), Scottish actress
- Aimi Nouchi (能智 亜衣美; born 1996), Japanese judoka
- Aimi Ozawa (小澤 愛実; born 2003), Japanese idol of idol group ≒Joy
- Aimi Satsukawa (佐津川 愛美; born 1988), Japanese actress
- Aimi Tanaka (田中 あいみ; born 1992), Japanese voice actress
- Aimi Yoshikawa (吉川 あいみ; born 1994), Japanese gravure idol, actress, AV idol

=== Fictional characters ===
- Aimi Eguchi (江口 愛実), fictional Japanese idol member of AKB48
- Aimi Komori (小森 アイミ)/Shadow Lady (シャドウレディ), anti-heroine of SHADOW LADY

== See also ==
- Aimee
- Aimie
- Ami (disambiguation)
- Amy
- Eimi (disambiguation)
- 愛未 (disambiguation)
- 愛美 (disambiguation)
