= Manaka =

Manaka may refer to:

- Manaka (given name), Japanese given name
- Manaka (surname), Japanese surname
