= Yossi Rosenwaks =

Israeli electrical engineer and academic administrator

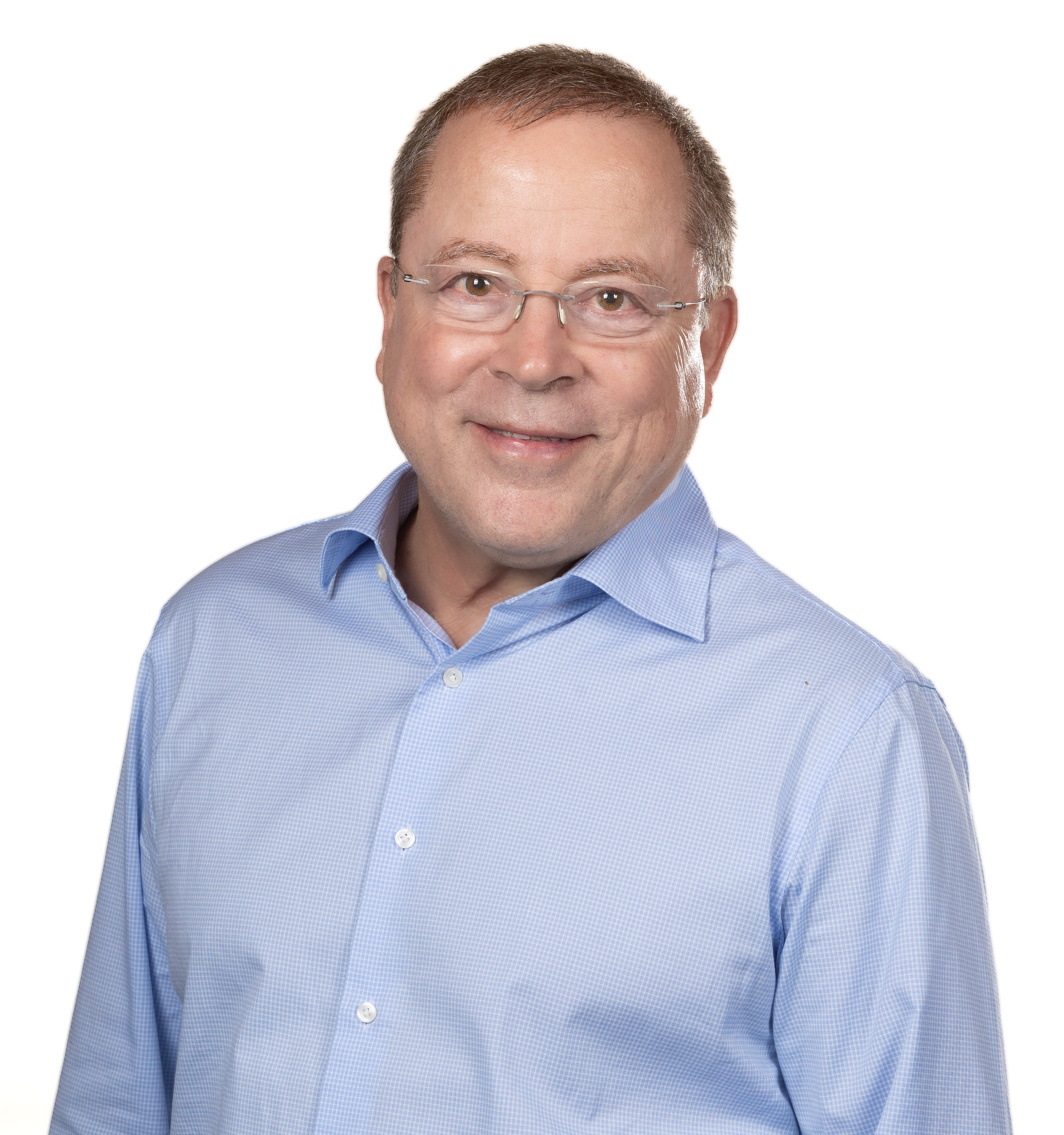
- Yossi Rosenwaks, 2026
- Born: 1958 (age 67–68); Israel
- Education: Tel Aviv University (PhD in Electrical Engineering)
- Occupations: Electrical engineer, researcher, academic administrator
- Employer(s): Afeka College of Engineering, Tel Aviv University
- Known for: Research in nanoelectronics and molecular sensors
- Title: President of Afeka Academic College of Engineering

Yossi Rosenwaks (born 1958) is an Israeli electrical engineer, nanotechnology researcher, and academic administrator. He serves as the president of Afeka Academic College of Engineering in Tel Aviv and is a professor emeritus at the School of Electrical Engineering of Tel Aviv University. He previously served as dean of the Faculty of Engineering at Tel Aviv University from 2014 to 2022.

== Biography ==
Rosenwaks received his PhD in electrical engineering from Tel Aviv University in 1992. He later completed a postdoctoral fellowship at the National Renewable Energy Laboratory (NREL) in the United States. In 1996, he joined the faculty of Tel Aviv University, where he became a full professor in 2005.

== Academic and administrative career ==
During his academic career at Tel Aviv University, Rosenwaks held several leadership positions, including Director of the Wolfson Materials Research Center and the Gordon Center for Energy from 2005 to 2008, Chair of the Department of Physical Electronics from 2011 to 2014, and founder and director of the university's Renewable Energy Center from 2011 to 2017.

From 2014 to 2022, he served as dean of the Faculty of Engineering at Tel Aviv University. Since 2022, he has been a member of the Israeli Council for Higher Education.

In 2025, Rosenwaks was appointed the fourth president of Afeka Academic College of Engineering, succeeding Ami Moyal.

== Research and academic impact ==
Rosenwaks is known for his research in nanoelectronics, semiconductor physics, nanoscale molecular sensors, and transistor technologies.

He has authored more than 200 scientific articles published in peer-reviewed journals and holds more than 10 patents, several of which led to the establishment of startup companies. According to Google Scholar, his research has been cited thousands of times, achieving an h-index of 53.

Throughout his career, Rosenwaks has supervised over 70 graduate students, several of whom have gone on to hold faculty positions at universities in Israel and internationally.

== Selected publications ==
- Rosenwaks, Y., Hanna, M. C., Levi, D. H., Szmyd, D. M., Ahrenkiel, R. K., & Nozik, A. J. (1993). "Hot-carrier cooling in GaAs: Quantum wells versus bulk." Physical Review B, 48(19), 14675-14678.
- Rosenwaks, Y., & Shikler, R. (2004). "Kelvin probe force microscopy of semiconductor surface defects." Physical Review B, 70(8), 085320.
- Tal, O., Rosenwaks, Y., Preezant, Y., Tessler, N., Chan, C. K., & Kahn, A. (2005). "Direct determination of the hole density of states in undoped and doped amorphous organic films with high lateral resolution." Physical Review Letters, 95(25), 256405.
- Koren, E., Berkovitch, N., & Rosenwaks, Y. (2010). "Measurement of active dopant distribution and diffusion in individual silicon nanowires." Nano Letters, 10(4), 1163-1167.
- Edri, E., Kirmayer, S., Henning, A., Mukhopadhyay, S., Gartsman, K., Rosenwaks, Y., Hodes, G., & Cahen, D. (2014). "Why lead methylammonium tri-iodide perovskite-based solar cells require a mesoporous electron transporting scaffold (but not necessarily a hole conductor)." Nano Letters, 14(2), 1000-1004.

== Personal life ==
Rosenwaks is married and has three daughters. He lives in Hod HaSharon, Israel.
