= Megumi =

- Gender: Female
- Language: Japanese

Origin
- Origin: Japanese
- Meaning: Different meanings depending on the kanji used
- Region of origin: Japan

Other names
- Nickname: Megu-chan
- Related names: Megu

Megumi (めぐみ, メグミ, 恵, 恵美, 愛, 恩恵, 恩) is a Japanese feminine given name. In Japanese, the word megumi means "blessing; grace."

== Written forms ==
While the word megumi means blessing and can be written using that kanji, it may also be spelled using other kanji, such as the kanji for love, or written using kana.

- 恵, "blessing, grace"
- 愛, "love"
- 恵美, "blessing, favor; beauty"
- 旋美, "rotate, turn; beauty"
- 寵美, "love, affection, patronage; beauty"
- 巡美, "circumference, patrol; beauty"
- 廻美, "round, game, revolve, go around, circumference; beauty"
- 斡美, "administer, go around, rule; beauty"

== People with the name ==
=== Given Name ===
- Megumi Abe (阿部 恵; born 1998), Japanese rugby union player
- Megumi Asaoka (麻丘めぐみ; born 1955), Japanese pop singer, and actress
- Megumi Field (born 2005), American synchronized swimmer
- Megumi Fujii (藤井 恵; born 1974), Japanese former professional mixed martial artist and submission wrestler
- Megumi Fujiwara (藤原 恵; born 1969), Japanese former long-distance runner
- Megumi Han (潘 めぐみ; born 1989), Japanese actress and voice actress
- Megumi Harada (born 1979), Canadian mathematician
- Megumi Hayashibara (林原 めぐみ; born 1967), Japanese voice actress, singer, lyricist and radio personality
- Megumi Hinata (日向 めぐみ; born 1978 or 1979), Japanese singer, lyricist, composer and musician
- Megumi Hirose (広瀬 めぐみ; born 1966), Japanese politician and lawyer
- Megumi Honda (本田 恵; born 1986), Japanese handball player
- Megumi Horikawa (堀川 恵; born 1995), Japanese retired judoka
- Megumi Igarashi (五十嵐 恵; born 1976), Japanese artist
- Megumi Ikeda (池田 めぐみ; born 1979), Japanese former fencer
- Megumi Inoue (井上 恵; born 1973), Japanese sport shooter
- Megumi Iseda (伊勢田 愛; born 1987), Japanese sailor
- Megumi Ishii (石井 めぐみ; born 1958), Japanese actress and politician
- Megumi Itabashi (板橋 恵; born 1973), Japanese volleyball player
- Megumi Ito (footballer) (伊藤 めぐみ; born 2002), Japanese professional footballer
- Megumi Itō (synchronized swimmer) (伊東 恵; born 1966), Japanese synchronized swimmer
- Megumi Kadonosono (門之園 恵美; born 1970), Japanese animator, animation director and character designer
- Megumi Kageyama (景山 恵; born 1992), Japanese field hockey player
- Megumi Kagurazaka (神楽坂 恵; born 1982), Japanese actress and glamour model
- Megumi Kamionobe (上尾野辺 めぐみ; born 1986), Japanese footballer
- Megumi Kanda (神田 めぐみ; born 1975), Japanese trombone performer
- Megumi Kaneko (金子 恵美; born 1978), Japanese politician
- Megumi Kawamura (河村 めぐみ; born 1983), Japanese volleyball player and fashion model
- Megumi Kinukawa (絹川 愛; born 1989), Japanese long-distance runner
- Megumi Kobashi (小橋 めぐみ; born 1979), Japanese actress
- Megumi Kobayashi (小林 恵; born 1977), Japanese model, actress and singer
- Megumi Kudo (工藤 めぐみ; born 1969), Japanese entertainment personality and former professional wrestler
- Megumi Kurihara (栗原 恵; born 1984), Japanese volleyball player
- Megumi Makihara (槇原 めぐみ), Japanese actress
- Megumi Masaki (born 1963), Japanese-Canadian pianist, multimedia artist, educator, researcher, arts administrator, conductor, and curator
- Megumi Matsumoto (松元 恵; born 1977), Japanese voice actress
- Megumi Matsushita (松下 恵; born 1981), Japanese actress
- Megumi Mizusawa (水沢 めぐみ; born 1963), Japanese manga artist
- Megumi Murakami (村上 愛; born 1992), Japanese choreographer and former singer and actress
- Megumi Murakami (beach volleyball) (村上 めぐみ; born 1985), Japanese beach volleyball player
- Megumi Murata (村田 めぐみ; born 1981), Japanese former member and sub-leader of Melon Kinenbi
- Megumi Nakajima (中島 愛; born 1989), Japanese voice actress and singer
- Megumi Nakamura (中村 恵実; born 2000), Japanese professional footballer
- Megumi Nishimoto (西本 愛実; born 2007), Japanese group rhythmic gymnast
- Megumi Odaka (小高 恵美; born 1972), Japanese former idol, actress and singer
- Megumi Ogata (緒方 恵美; born 1965), Japanese actress and singer
- Megumi Ohnaka (大中 恩; 1924-2018), Japanese composer
- Megumi Ōhara (大原 めぐみ; born 1975), Japanese voice actress
- Megumi Ohori (大堀 恵; born 1983), Japanese singer and tarento
- Megumi Ōji (大路 恵美; born 1975), Japanese actress
- Megumi Okina (奥菜 恵; born 1979), Japanese actress and J-pop singer
- Megumi Oshima (大島 めぐみ; born 1975), Japanese long-distance runner
- Megumi Sakata (坂田 恵; born 1971), Japanese former football player
- Megumi Sasaki (佐々木 芽生; born 1962), Japanese filmmaker and writer
- Megumi Sato (actress) (佐藤 めぐみ; born 1984), Japanese actress and television personality
- Megumi Sato (athlete) (佐藤 恵; born 1966), Japanese high jumper
- Megumi Satsu (薩 めぐみ; 1948-2010), French-Japanese singer
- Megumi Seki (関 めぐみ; born 1985), Japanese actress
- Megumi Tachikawa (立川 恵), Japanese manga artist
- Megumi Tachimoto (田知本 愛; born 1989), Japanese female former judoka
- Megumi Takamoto (高本 めぐみ; born 1985), Japanese voice actress
- Megumi Takase (高瀬 愛実; born 1990), Japanese footballer
- Megumi Taneda (種田 恵; born 1986), Japanese swimmer
- Megumi Taruno (樽野 恵; born 1988), Japanese female badminton player
- Megumi Toda (戸田 めぐみ; born 1990), Japanese voice actress
- Megumi Torigoe (鳥越 恵; born 1976), Japanese women's footballer
- Megumi Toyoguchi (豊口 めぐみ; born 1978), Japanese voice actress
- Megumi Urawa (浦和 めぐみ; born 1965), Japanese voice actress
- Megumi Yabushita (藪下 めぐみ; born 1972), Japanese female mixed martial artist, kickboxer, professional wrestler and judoka
- Megumi Yamaguchi (山口 愛; born 1997), Japanese actress and voice actress
- Megumi Yamaguchi Shinoda (1908–2007), Japanese American physician
- Megumi Yamano (山野 めぐみ; born 1981), Japanese tarento, actress, singer, and gravure idol
- Megumi Yasu (安 めぐみ; born 1981), Japanese entertainer and actress
- Megumi Yokota (横田 めぐみ; born 1964), one of at least thirteen Japanese citizens kidnapped by North Korea in the late 1970s and early 1980s
- Megumi Yokoyama (actress) (横山 めぐみ; born 1969), Japanese actress
- Megumi Yokoyama (badminton) (横山 めぐみ; born 1990), Japanese badminton player

=== Surname ===
- Ryutaro Megumi (恵 龍太郎; born 1993), Japanese footballer
- Toshiaki Megumi (恵 俊彰; born 1964), Japanese comedian, actor, television presenter, and newscaster

== Fictional characters ==
- Megumi Aino of HappinessCharge PreCure!
- Megumi Amano of Urotsukidoji
- Megumi Amatsuka of Cheeky Angel
- Megumi Ayase of Mahou no Tenshi Creamy Mami
- Megumi Eto of Battle Royale
- Megumi Fujishima of Link! Like! Love Live!
- Megumi Fushiguro of Jujutsu Kaisen
- Megumi Hanajima of Fruits Basket
- Megumi Imae of WataMote
- Megumi Iruma from Ultraman Tiga
- Megumi Kanoya of Ouran High School Host Club
- Megumi Kato of Saekano: How to Raise a Boring Girlfriend
- Megumi Minami of Tantei Gakuen Q
- Megumi Misaki (a.k.a. Blue Dolphin) of Choujuu Sentai Liveman
- Megumi Momono of Mahoraba ~Heartful Days~
- Megumi Morisato of Oh My Goddess!
- Megumi Natsu of Is the Order a Rabbit?
- Megumi Noda of Nodame Cantabile
- Megumi Oumi of Zatch Bell! (Konjiki no Gash!!)
- Megumi Reinard of Nadesico
- Megumi Sagano of School Rumble
- Megumi Sakura of School-Live!
- Megumi Sawatari of Megatokyo
- Megumi Shimizu of Shiki
- Megumi Shitow of RahXephon
- Megumi Sokabe of K-on!
- Megumi Takani of Rurouni Kenshin (Samurai X)
- Megumi Tadokoro of Food Wars!: Shokugeki no Soma
- Megumi Tokoro of The Idolmaster Million Live!
- Megumi Yamamoto of Special A
- Megumi Yoshikawa from Princess Princess and The Day of Revolution
- Megumi, a minor character in the video game Guilty Gear
- Megumi of the video games series Crash Bandicoot

== See also ==
- 愛未 (disambiguation)
- 愛美 (disambiguation)
