= Ami (given name) =

- Gender: Female in Hebrew, Persian, Indian, and Japanese
- Language: Japanese, Hebrew, Persian, Kannada, Malayalam, Gujarati, Telugu, Tamil, Punjabi, French

Origin
- Meaning: "My nation", "my people" or "trustworthy", "reliable" in Hebrew "Nectar" (female), or "much loved" (male) in Indian in Japanese, it can have many different meanings depending on the kanji used. Means "Friend" in French.
- Region of origin: Israel (Jewish diaspora), Persian, Japan, India (Indian diaspora)

Ami is a given name of Hebrew, Persian, Indian, Japanese, and other origins.

== Written forms in Japanese ==
Forms in kanji can include:

- 亜美, "asia-beauty"
- 亜海, "asia-ocean"
- 亜実, "asia-fruit"
- 亜満, "asia-, satisfy, full"
- 亜魅, "asia-fascination"
- あみ (in Hiragana)
- アミ (in Katakana)

== People with the name ==
- Ami Omer Dadaon (born 2000), Israeli Paralympic champion swimmer
- Ami Dolenz (born 1969), American producer television and film actress
- Ami Ghia (born 1956), Indian former badminton player
- Ami Kawai (河合 亞美; born 1967), Japanese stage and television actress
- Ami Harten (1947–1994), Israeli-American applied mathematician
- Ami Haruna (春名 あみ; born 1984), Japanese model and actress
- Ami Horowitz, American film maker
- Ami Inamura (稲村 亜美; born 1996), Japanese gravure idol, television personality and sportscaster
- Ami Ishii (石井亜海; born 2002), Japanese freestyle wrestler
- Ami James (born 1972), Israeli-American co-owner of tattoo parlor which is the subject of the reality television program Miami Ink
- Ami Kikuchi (菊地 亜美; born 1990), Japanese gravure idol, tarento and radio presenter
- Ami Klin, American psychologist
- Ami Koshimizu (小清水 亜美; born 1986), Japanese voice actress
- Ami Kondo (近藤 亜美; born 1995), Japanese judoka
- Ami Maayani (1936–2019), Israeli composer
- Ami Maeshima (前島 亜美; born 1977), Japanese idol and actress
- Ami Mali Hicks (1867–1954), American artist, suffragist and writer.
- Ami Mazar (born 1942), Israeli archaeologist and professor
- Ami McKay (born 1968), Canadian novelist and journalist
- Ami Metcalf (born 1994), English actress
- Ami Mishra, Indian singer-songwriter
- Ami Miron, Israeli-American entrepreneur and technology developer
- Ami Moyal (born 1962), Israeli engineer and academic
- Ami Nakai (中井 亜美; born 2008), Japanese figure skater
- Ami Nakamura (中村 亜実; born 1987), Japanese ice hockey player
- Ami Nakashima (中島 麻未; born 1988), Japanese singer, dancer and actress
- Ami Onuki (大貫亜美; born 1973), Japanese pop singer
- Ami Parekh (born 1988), Indian-American figure skater
- Ami Popper (born 1969), Israeli mass murderer
- Ami Shelef (1936–1988, Israeli basketball player and coach
- Ami Sheth, American actress and model.
- Ami Suzuki (鈴木亜美; born 1982), Japanese singer and songwriter
- Ami Tokito (時東 ぁみ; born 1987), Japanese pop singer and gravure idol
- Ami Touma (當真 あみ; born 2006), Japanese actress
- Ami Trivedi (born 1982), Indian television and theatre actress
- Ami Vashi (born 1981), Indian beauty queen and model
- Ami Vitale (born 1971), American photojournalist and documentary filmmaker
- Ami Yoshida (吉田 アミ; born 1976), Japanese musician
- Ami Yuasa (湯浅 亜実; born 1998), Japanese breakdancer
- Andreea Ioana Moldovan (born 1989), Romanian singer professionally known as AMI

== Fictional characters ==
- Ami Aiba, a character/protagonist in the game Digimon Story: Cyber Sleuth
- Ami Hinamori, the younger sister of Amu Hinamori in the Shugo Chara! manga series
- Ami Kawamura, one of the main characters in the Little Battlers Experience game and anime series
- Ami Kawashima, in the Toradora! light novel series
- Ami Kitajima, in the manga Digimon Next
- Ami Matsuzaki, one of the main characters in the manga and 2005 anime Animal Yokochō
- Ami Mizuno, one of the main characters in the original anime series of Sailor Moon including its reboot Sailor Moon Crystal
- Ami Onuki, in the animated series Hi Hi Puffy AmiYumi, based on the Japanese Pop singer by the same name
- Ami, a character from the video games series Crash Bandicoot, first introduced in Crash Team Racing

== See also ==
- Ami (disambiguation)
- Amy
- 愛未
- 愛美 (disambiguation)
