= Megumi (disambiguation) =

Megumi is a Japanese feminine name.

Megumi may also refer to:

- Megumi (actress) (born 1981), Japanese actress
- Megumi (manga), a manga about a Japanese girl who was abducted by North Korean spies, later adapted into anime
- Megumi-Toons, an autobiographical manga series written by voice actress Megumi Hayashibara
- 3774 Megumi, a minor planet
