= Sawatari =

Sawatari may refer to:

- Hajime Sawatari (沢渡 朔, born 1940), Japanese photographer
- Akane Sawatari (沢渡 アカネ), a fictional character in the Chainsaw Man manga and anime series
