= Manami =

- Gender: Unisex

Origin
- Origin: Japanese
- Meaning: Different meanings depending on the kanji used
- Region of origin: Japan

Other names
- Related names: Mami, Mana, Manaka

Manami (まなみ, マナミ) is a common primarily feminine Japanese given name.

== Written forms ==
Manami can be written using different kanji characters and can mean:

- 愛美, "love, beauty"
- 愛海, "love, sea"
- 愛未, "love, not yet"
- 愛実, "love, fruit"
- 真名美, "truth, name, beauty"
- 真奈美, "truth, Nara, beauty"
- 麻奈美, "hemp, Nara, beauty"
- 真奈海, "truth, Nara, sea"

The name can also be written in hiragana or katakana.

== People ==
- Manami Doi (土居 愛実; born 1993), Japanese sports sailor
- Manami Fujioka (藤岡 麻菜美; born 1994), Japanese women's basketball player
- Manami Hashimoto (橋本 マナミ; born 1984), Japanese gravure idol and actress
- Manami Higa (愛未, born 1986), Japanese actress
- Manami Hino (真奈美, born 1980), Japanese bobsledder
- Manami Ishizaka (石坂 真奈美; born 1986), Japanese female artistic gymnast
- Manami Kamitanida (born 1989), Japanese long-distance runner
- Manami Katsu (愛実, born 1994), Japanese professional wrestler
- Manami Kira (吉良 愛美; born 1991), Japanese sprinter and hurdler
- Manami Konishi (真奈美, born 1978), Japanese actress
- Manami Kurose (真奈美, born 1991), Japanese actress and singer
- Manami Marutaka (丸高 愛実; born 1990), Japanese tarento, actress, and former gravure idol
- Manami Matsumae (真奈美), Japanese game music composer
- Manami Mitsuboshi (三星 マナミ; born 1984), Japanese freestyle skier
- Manami Nakano (中野 真奈美; born 1986), Japanese footballer playing as a midfielder
- Manami Numakura (愛美), Japanese voice actress
- Manami Oku (真奈美, born 1995), Japanese idol singer
- Manami Takada (高田 麻菜美; born 1988), Japanese woman cricketer
- Manami Tanaka (田中 真奈美; born 1989), Japanese voice actress
- Manami Tanaka (tennis) (田中 愛美; born 1996), Japanese wheelchair tennis player
- Manami Toyota (真奈美, born 1971), Japanese professional wrestler
- Manami Ui (宇井 愛美; born 1986), Japanese model
- Manami Wakayama (愛美, born 1986), Japanese idol
- Manami Watanabe (愛未, born 1986), female lead singer of Jyukai, a Japanese pop/soft rock group
- Manami (wrestler) (born 2004), Japanese wrestler

== Fictional Characters ==
- Manami Amamiya (学美), the main character in the manga and anime series Gakuen Utopia Manabi Straight!
- Manami Aoki (真奈美), the character in the manga series Haikyū!!, the position is Setter and the number is 3
- Manami Hyuga (真奈美), a character in the 1998 Japanese film Bayside Shakedown: The Movie
- Manami Kasuga (まなみ), a character in the manga and anime series Kimagure Orange Road
- Manami Kusunoki (真奈美), a character from the 2D fighting game Variable Geo series
- Manami Tamura (麻奈実), a character in the manga and anime series Ore no Imōto ga Konna ni Kawaii Wake ga Nai
- Manami Okuda (愛美), a character in the manga and anime series Assassination Classroom

== See also ==
- 愛未 (disambiguation)
- 愛美 (disambiguation)
