= Aimie =

Aimie is a feminine given name. Notable people with the name include:

- Aimie Clydesdale (born 1993), Australian basketball player
- Aimie Atkinson (born 1987), English actress and singer
- Aimie K. Runyan (born 1979), American author of historical and women's fiction, including bestsellers Daughters of the Night Sky and Across the Winding River

== See also ==
- Aimée
- Aimi (disambiguation)
