= Sangane Station =

Railway station in Kōta, Aichi Prefecture, Japan

CA49 Sangane Station 三ヶ根駅
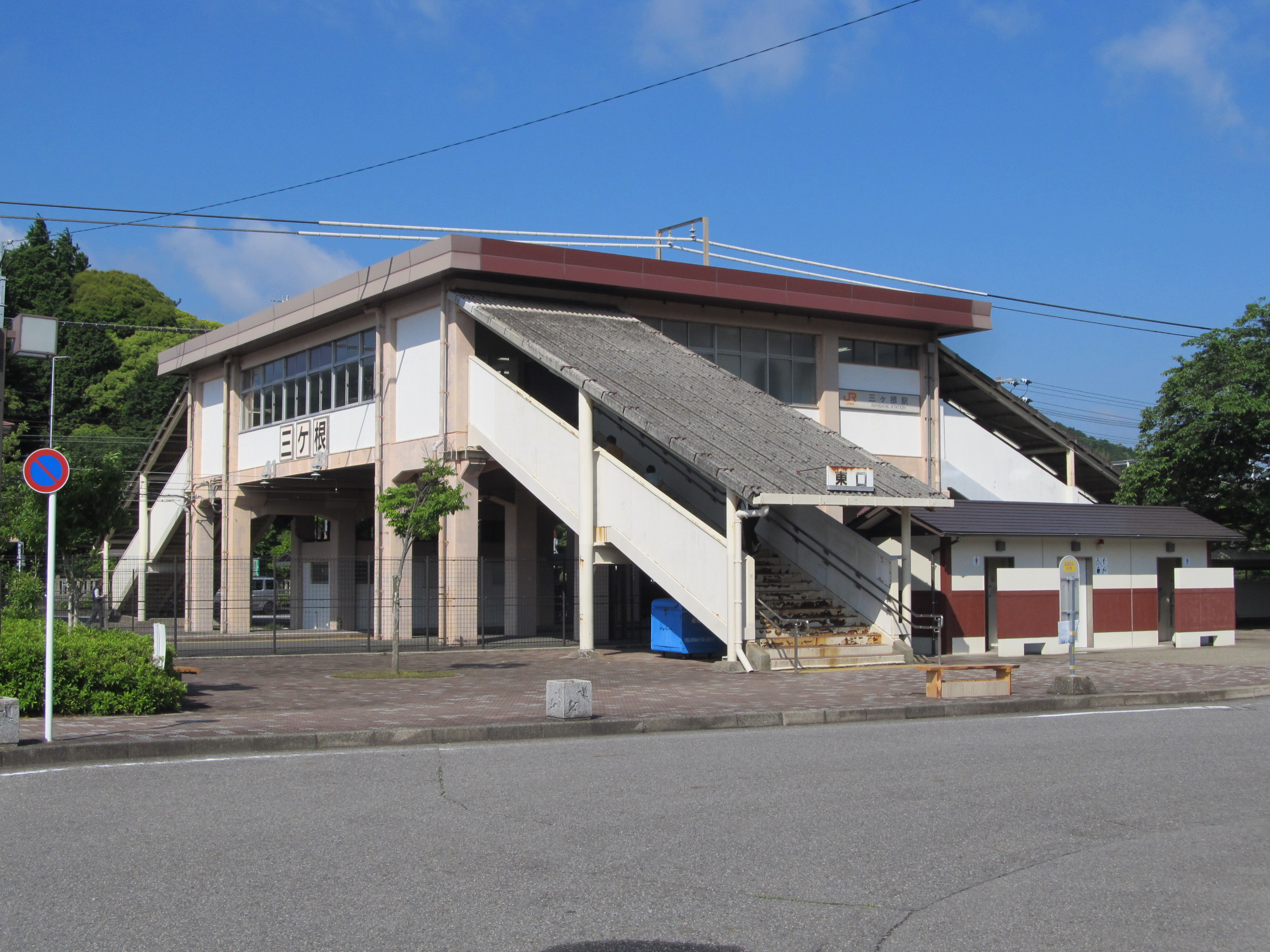
- Sangane Station in May 2022

General information
- Location: Ōikeda-12-1 Fukōzu, Kota-machi, Nukata-gun, Aichi-ken 444-0124; Japan
- Coordinates: 34°50′9″N 137°10′38″E
- Operator: JR Central
- Line: Tokaido Main Line
- Distance: 315.5 kilometers from Tokyo
- Platforms: 2 side platforms

Other information
- Status: Unstaffed
- Station code: CA49

History
- Opened: March 20, 1967

Passengers
- 2023–2024: 1,729 daily
Location
- Location within Aichi Prefecture Location within Japan

Sangane Station (三ヶ根駅, Sangane-eki) is a railway station in the town of Kōta, Aichi Prefecture, Japan, operated by Central Japan Railway Company (JR Tōkai).

== Lines ==
Sangane Station is served by the Tōkaidō Main Line, and is located 315.5 kilometers from the starting point of the line at Tokyo Station.

== Station layout ==
The station has two opposed side platforms connected by an elevated station building located perpendicular to the tracks and platforms. The station building has automated ticket machines, TOICA automated turnstiles and is unattended.

=== Platforms ===
1	■ Tōkaidō Main Line	For Okazaki, Nagoya
2	■ Tōkaidō Main Line	For Toyohashi, Hamamatsu

== Adjacent stations ==
«	Service	»
Central Japan Railway Company
Tōkaidō Main Line
Special Rapid: Does not stop at this station
New Rapid: Does not stop at this station
Rapid: Does not stop at this station
Mikawa-Shiotsu	Sectional Rapid	Kōda
Mikawa-Shiotsu	Local	Kōda

== Station history ==
Sangane Station was opened on March 20, 1967, as a station on the Japan National Railway (JNR), after petitions by local residents over a period of more than seventeen years.

Although the station was located in Fukozu, the station's name was changed to Sangane due to the fact that the name Fukozu was considered hard to read, and because it was close to Mt.Sangane. However, after the ropeway to the mountain was closed in 1976, and the Meitetsu Bus line connecting the station and the ropeway were also closed, the station no longer functions as the gateway to Mt.Sangane. Automated turnstiles using the TOICA IC Card system came into operation from November 25, 2006.

Station numbering was introduced to the section of the Tōkaidō Line operated JR Central in March 2018; Sangane Station was assigned station number CA49

== Passenger statistics ==
In fiscal 2017, the station was used by an average of 965 passengers daily (boarding passengers only).

== Surrounding area ==
- Fukōzu Elementary School

== See also ==
- List of railway stations in Japan
