= Kōda Station (Aichi) =

Railway station in Kōta, Aichi Prefecture, Japan

CA50 Kōda Station 幸田駅
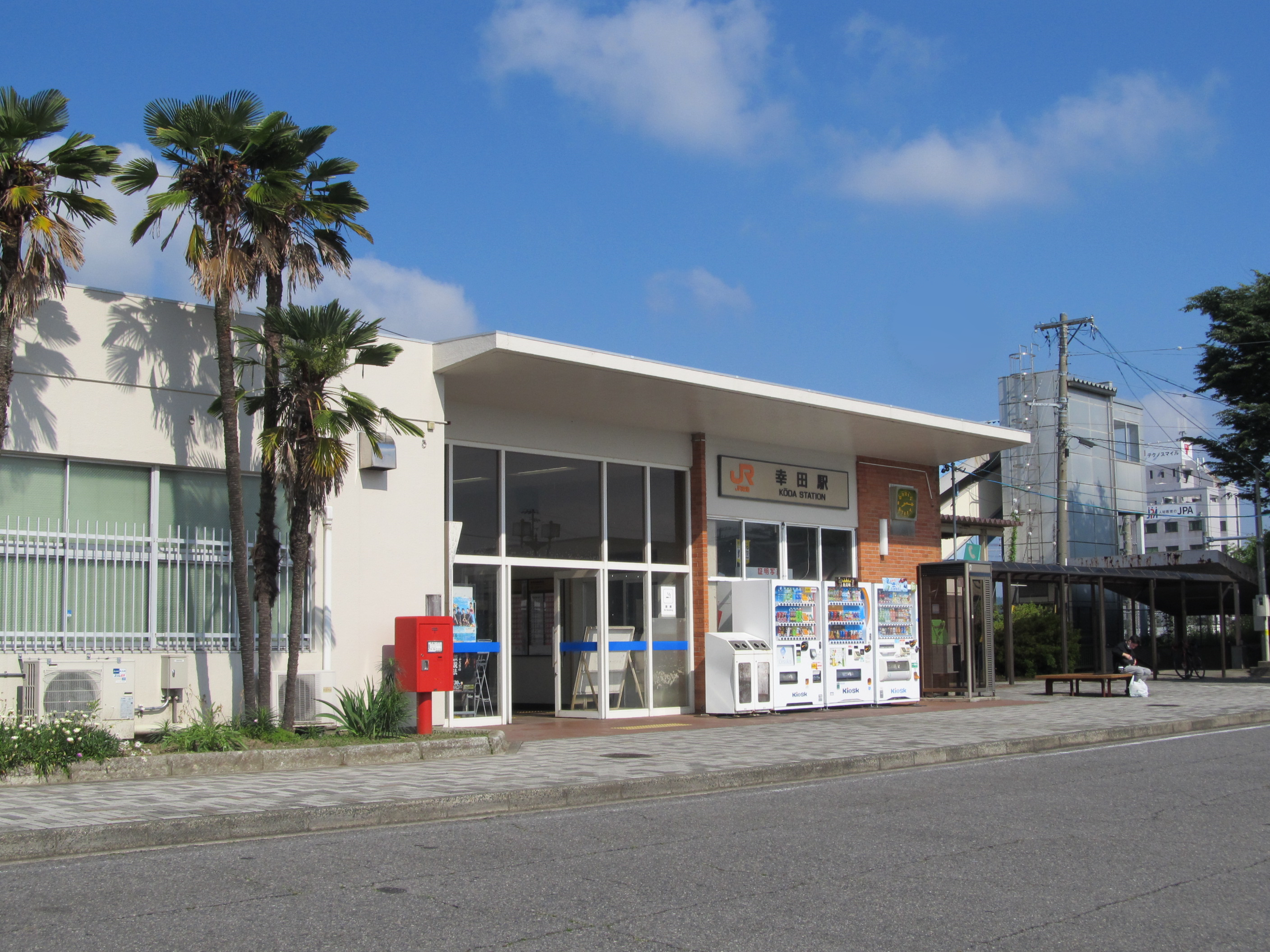
- Kōda Station, May 2022

General information
- Location: Kōda 140-1 Ashinoya, Kōta-machi, Nukata-gun, Aichi-ken 444-0116; Japan
- Coordinates: 34.8597°N 137.1645°E
- Operator: JR Central
- Line: Tokaido Main Line
- Distance: 318.5 kilometers from Tokyo
- Platforms: 1 island platforms

Other information
- Status: Unstaffed
- Station code: CA50
- Website: Official website

History
- Opened: September 11, 1908

Passengers
- 2023–2024: 7,308 daily
Location
- Location within Aichi Prefecture Location within Japan

Kōda Station (幸田駅, Kōda-eki) is a railway station in the town of Kōta, Aichi Prefecture, Japan, operated by Central Japan Railway Company (JR Tōkai).

== Lines ==
Kōda Station is served by the Tōkaidō Main Line, and is located 318.5 kilometers from the starting point of the line at Tokyo Station.

== Station layout ==
The station has a single island platform connected to the elevated station building by a footbridge. The station building has automated ticket machines, TOICA automated turnstiles and is unattended.

=== Platforms ===
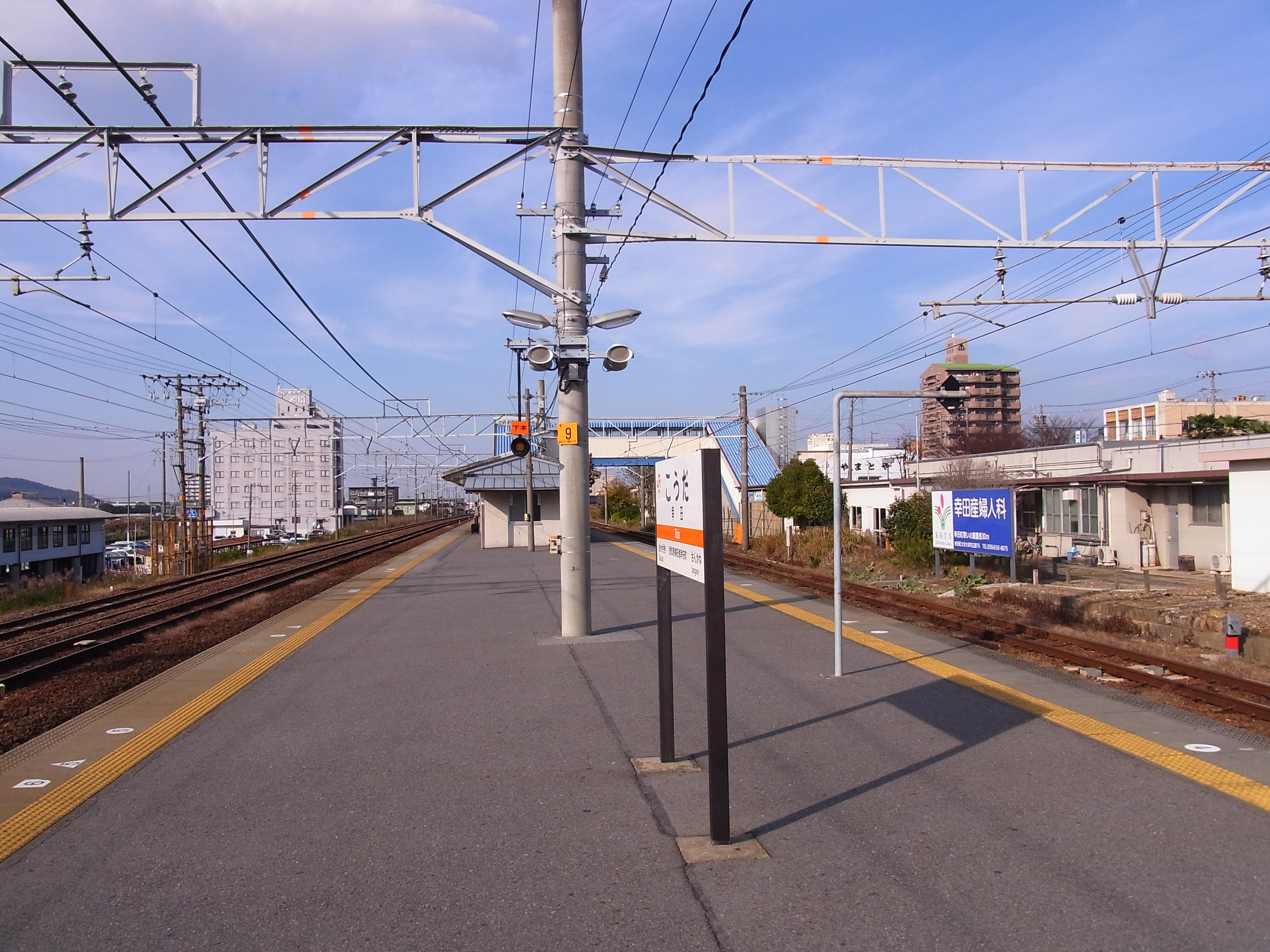
View of the platforms, November 2010

1	■ Tōkaidō Main Line	for Toyohashi and Hamamatsu
2	■ Tōkaidō Main Line	for Okazaki and Nagoya

== Adjacent stations ==
«	Service	»
Tōkaidō Main Line
Gamagōri	New Rapid	Okazaki
Gamagōri	Rapid	Okazaki
Sangane	Sectional Rapid	Okazaki
Sangane	Local	Aimi
Special Rapid: Does not stop at this station

== History ==
Kōda Station began as Ashiya Signal Stop (芦谷信号所, Ashiya shingōsho) on the Japanese Government Railway (JGR) Tōkaidō Line in April 1906. It was upgraded to become a full station and given its present name on September 11, 1908. The JGR became the JNR (Japan National Railway) after World War II. All freight operations were discontinued in 1971. With the privatization of the JNR on April 1, 1987, the station came under the control of JR Central. Automated turnstiles using the TOICA IC Card system came into operation from November 25, 2006.

Station numbering was introduced to the section of the Tōkaidō Line operated JR Central in March 2018; Kōda Station was assigned station number CA50.

== Passenger statistics ==
In fiscal 2017, the station was used by an average of 3978 passengers daily (boarding passengers only).

== Surrounding area ==
- Kōta Town Hall

== See also ==
- List of railway stations in Japan
