= 愛未 =

愛未 is a Japanese feminine given name meaning "love, not yet".

It may refer to:

- Aimi (disambiguation) (given name)
- Ami (given name)
- Manami (given name)
- Megumi (given name)

== See also ==
- 愛美 (disambiguation)
