= Megu =

Megu is a Japanese feminine given name. Notable people with the name include:

- Megu Ashiro (亜城 めぐ, born 1978), a Japanese voice actress
- Megu Fujigamori (藤ヶ森 めぐ, born 1988), a Japanese hostess and model
- Megu Hirose (廣瀬 芽, born 1981), a Japanese softball player
- Megu Sakuragawa (櫻川 めぐ, born 1988), Japanese singer
- Megu Uyama (宇山 芽紅, born 1996), Japanese individual and synchronized trampoline gymnast

== Fictional characters ==
- Megu (Is the Order a Rabbit?), a character in the manga series Is the Order a Rabbit?
- Megu Kakizaki, a fictional character appearing in Rozen Maiden
- Megu Kanzaki, a fictional and the main character for Majokko Megu-chan
- Megu Shimokura, a character from the role-playing video game Blue Archive
