= Yamakage Shinto =

Shinto religious movement

- 山蔭神道
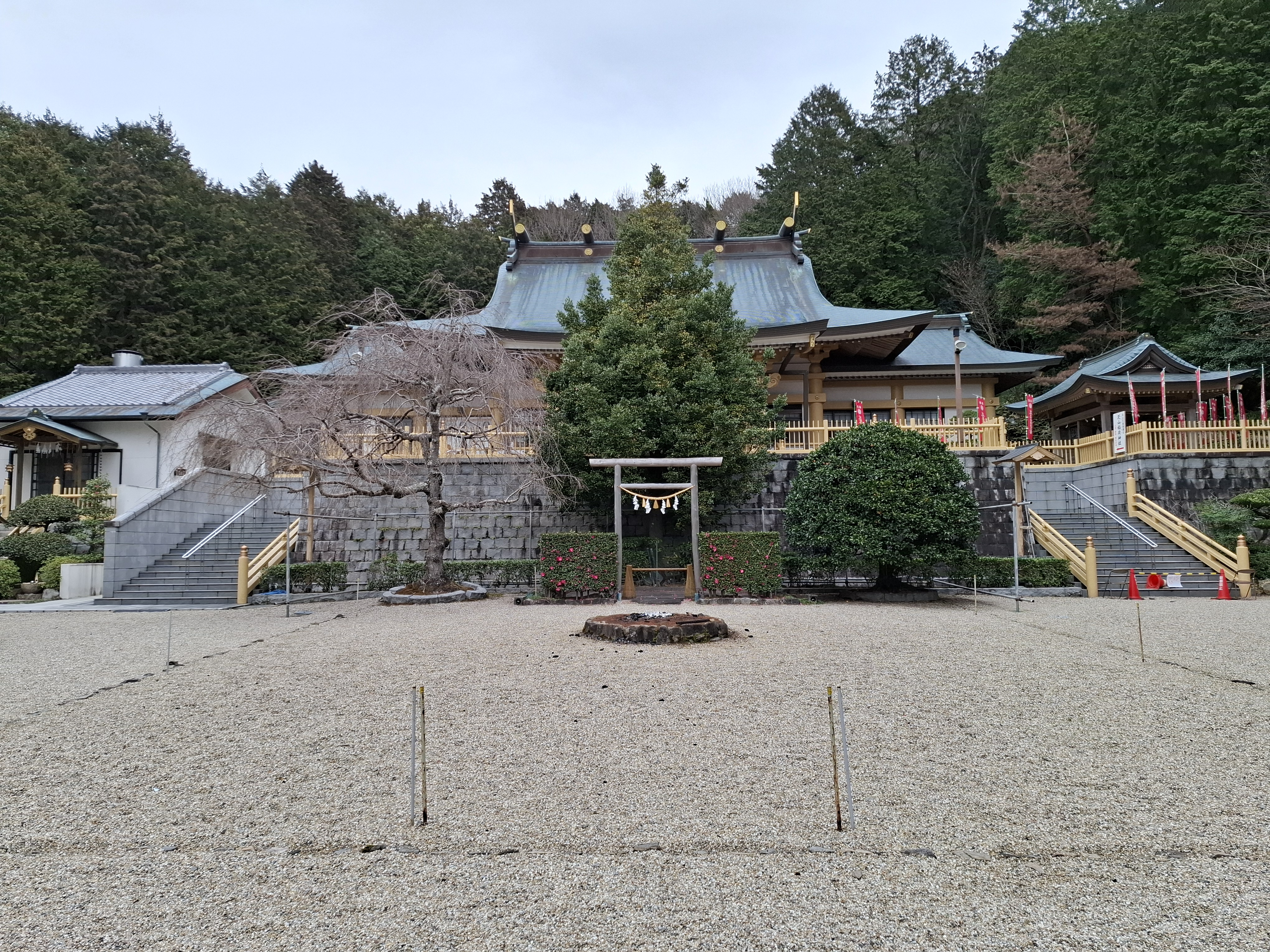
- Kirei-gū (貴嶺宮), Yamakage Shinto's headquarters in Kōta, Aichi
- Head (Priest): Yamakage Hitoyoshi (山蔭仁嘉)
- Headquarters: Kōta, Aichi (Note: It is situated directly across the road from Chūsei Shrine, a Shinto-based religious facility that houses the spirit of Chiang Kai-shek as a kami.)
- Founder: Yamakage Motohisa (山蔭基央)
- Origin: 1954
- Members: 1,618 in 2025
- Slogan: Ajimarikan (アジマリカン)

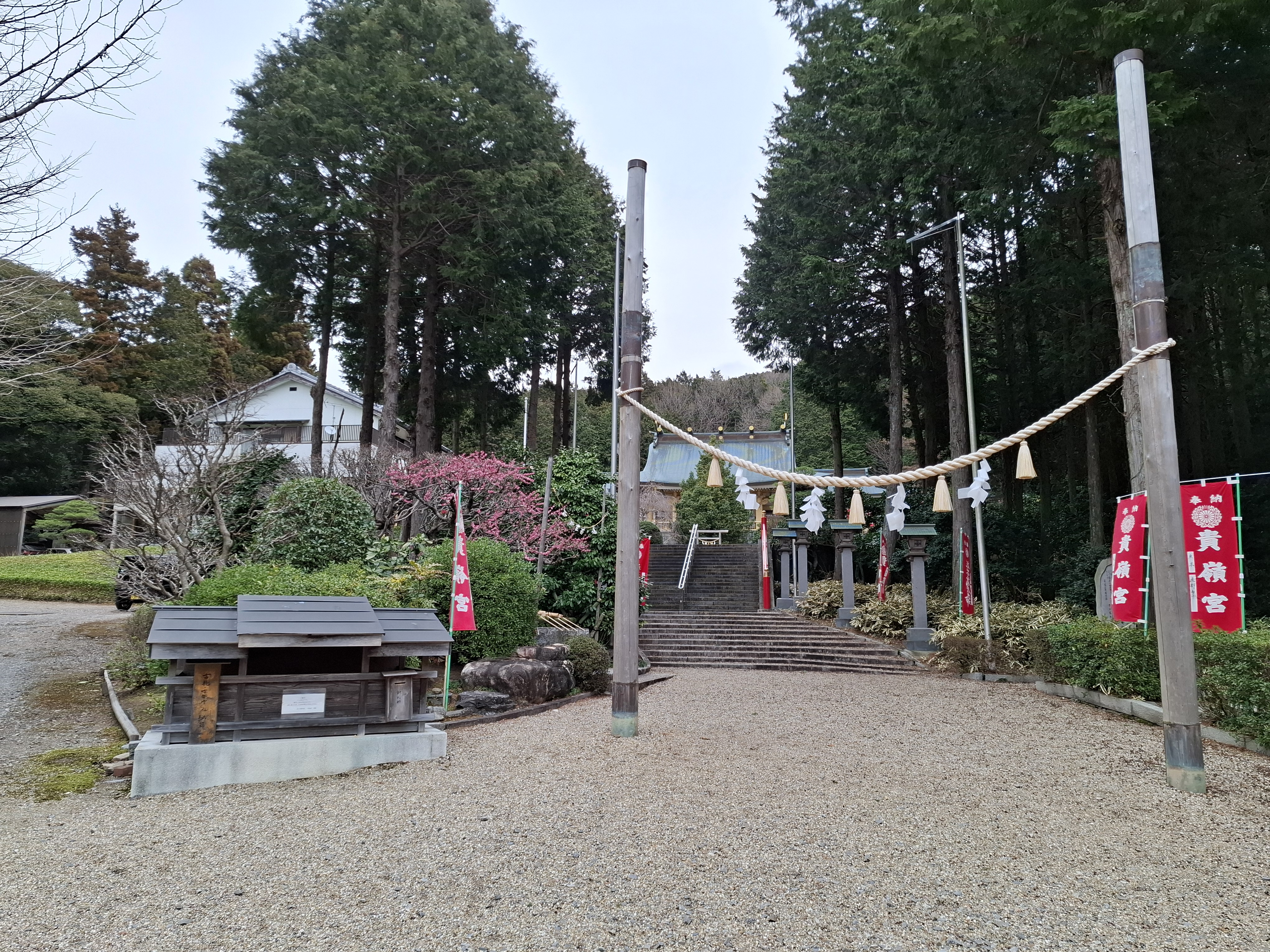
The entrance of Kirei-gū (貴嶺宮), Yamakage Shinto's headquarters in Kōta, Aichi

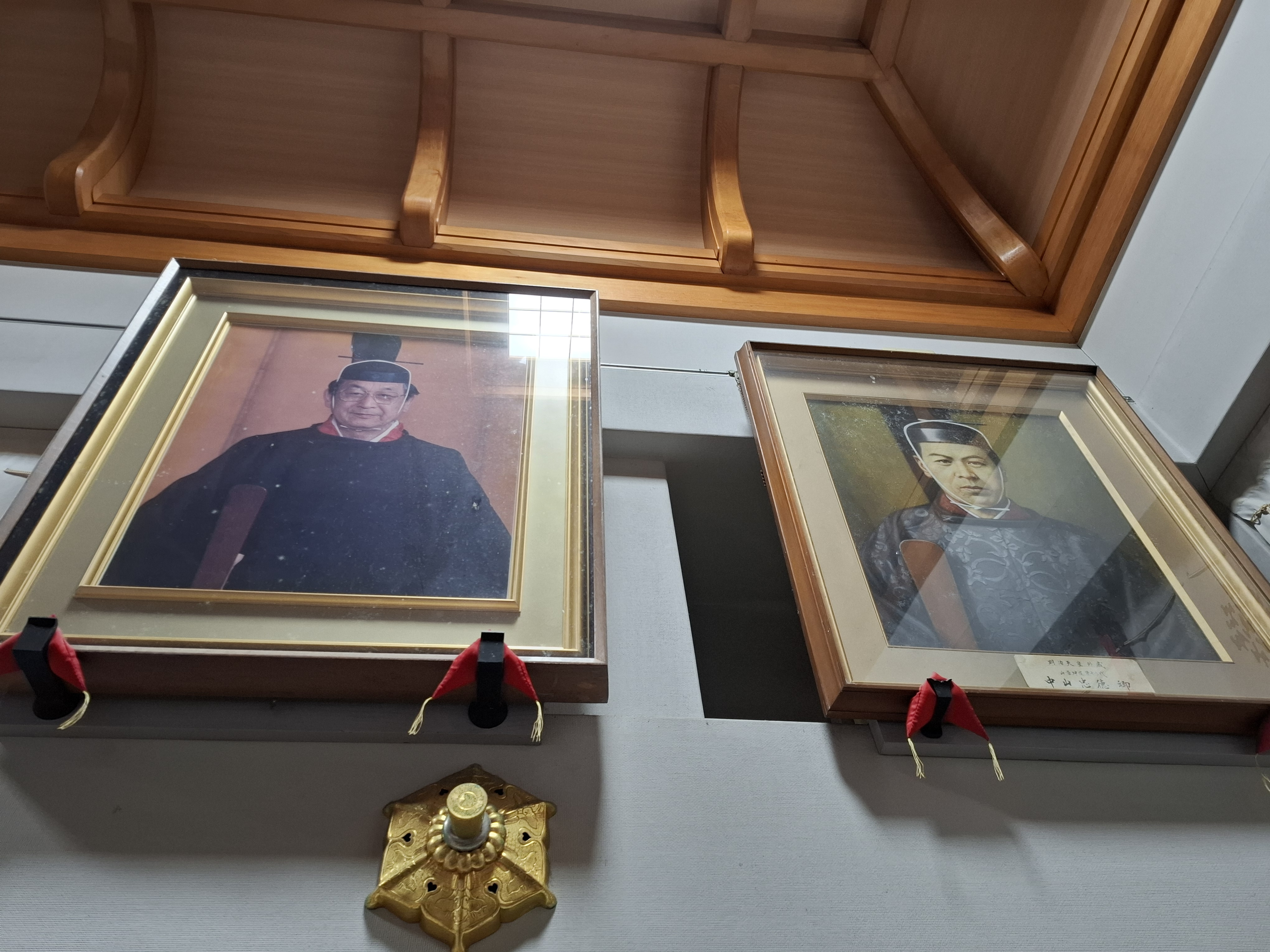
Portraits of Yamakage Motohisa (山蔭基央) (left) and Nakayama Tadanori (中山忠徳) (right) inside Kirei-gū's main worship building

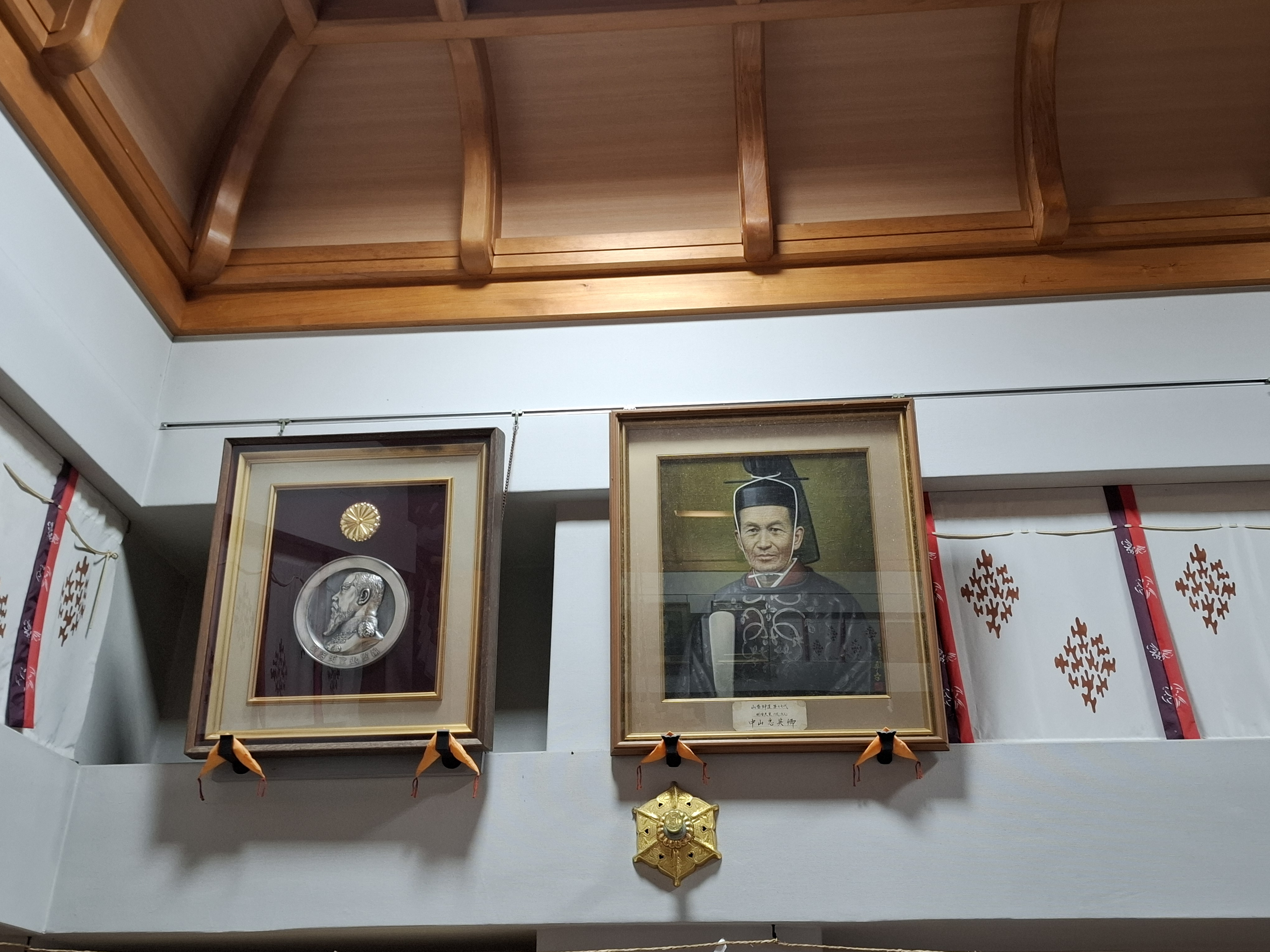
A portrait of Nakayama Tadafusa (中山忠英) (right) inside Kirei-gū's main worship building

Yamakage Shinto (Japanese: 山蔭神道, Hepburn: Yamakage Shintō) is a New Sect Shinto-based shinshūkyō (Japanese new religion) that is based on the legacies and traditions of Ko-Shintō. The founder of the modern form of the religious organization was Yamakage Motohisa (山蔭基央). Yamakage Hitoyoshi (山蔭仁嘉) is the current 81st head of Yamakage Shinto.

== History ==
Yamakage Shinto came from generations of families that preserved and practiced Ko-Shintō traditions for generations. The earliest recognizable form of Yamakage Shinto started its origins before the Bakumatsu period and right before the Meiji Restoration. Below is the list of leaders of the earliest Yamakage Shinto with the descriptions of their spiritual or national achievements:

- The 75th head, Yamakage Kazuhira (山蔭昌衡) (Note: He came from a family that managed the system of Yoshida Shinto under the patronage of the Tokugawa clan.) who revived aspects of Ko-Shintō and incorporated doctrinal elements of Suika Shinto.
- The 76th head, Nakayama Tadakore (中山忠伊) (Note: He was the son of Emperor Kōkaku and Emperor Kōkaku's concubine, resulting him illegitimate in the imperial succession.) (1804 – 1864) who made a contribution to the collapse of the Tokugawa shogunate.
- The 77th head, Nakayama Tadafusa (中山忠英) (Note: He was the biological son of Nakayama Tadakore.) (1846 – 1916) who participated in the national governance under Emperor Meiji to elevate the social and political status of the Imperial House of Japan with the additional help of his own organization, Kōdōkai (皇道会), which was later renamed as Dai Nihon Kōdō Ritsukyōkai (大日本皇道立教会).

The 78th head Nakayama Tadanori (中山忠徳) (Note: He was the third son of Nakayama Tadafusa.) (1898 – 1957) converted to Ontakekyō in 1921 and created his own separate religious organization called Ontake Honkyō (御嶽本教) in April 1927 and renamed it to Jinrui Aishin Taisokyō (人類愛信太祖教) two years later.

Afterwards, it was renamed as Aishinkai (愛信会) after the Occupation of Japan in 1954; afterwards it merged with Yuiitsu Shintō Tensokyō (唯一神道天祖教) (Note: The Kōchi-based Yuiitsu Shintō Tensokyō was originally a faction of Omiyakyō (御祖教) that became independent. Omiyakyō stll survives in Kōchi as of 2026.) to change its name to Tensha Yamakage Shintō Aishinkai (天社山蔭神道愛信会) (Note: Tensha Yamakage Shintō Aishinkai was based in Osaka.) in 1956 and finally Nakayama Tanadori's adopted son as well as the 79th head, Yamakage Motohisa (山蔭基央) (11 March 1925 – July 2013), renamed it to Yamakage Shinto in 1966.

== Belief ==
The two important kami figures in Yamakage Shinto are Ōkuninushi and Sukunabikona.

== Activities ==
It is known as a Sect Shinto-based new religious organization that performs vigorous publication of literature for laypeople, especially under Yamakage Motohisa.

Chinkon meditation is practiced in Yamakage Shinto. The Shinto sect, headquartered at Kirei-gū (貴嶺宮) in Kōta, Aichi Prefecture, is associated with the modern koshintō (古神道) revival movement. Chinkon meditation in Yamakage Shinto is performed while seated on the floor and is performed using techniques such as breathing exercises, counting numbers, mudras, meditating on a mirror, and ritual chanting.

== Incantation ==
The most sacred incantation in Yakamage Shinto is Ajimarikan (アジマリカン). It is also written as 天地真理観.

== Branch Shrines ==
- Mizuho Shrine (瑞穂神社) based in Yokohama
- Yamagake Shintō Nichiran Shinzensaigū (山蔭神道日蘭親善斎宮) based in Amsterdam, the Netherlands. It is led by Paul de Leeuw, a Dutch Shinto priest.

== See also ==
- Shinto sects and schools
