= Eimi =

Eimi may refer to:

== People with the given name ==
- Eimi Kuroda (黒田 エイミ, born 1988), Japanese fashion model
- Eimi Haneoka (羽丘 映美), a character in Saint Tail
- Amy Harvey (ハーヴィー 瑛美, born 2002), Japanese singer and model
- Eimi Naruse (成瀬 瑛美, born 1988), Japanese singer and voice actress
- Amy Yamada (山田 詠美, born 1959), Japanese writer
- Eimi Gloria Matsudo (松戸グロリア英美, born 1994) Italian-Japanese professional wrestler also known as Giulia

== Other uses ==
- EIMI, a 1933 book by E. E. Cummings about a 1931 trip to the Soviet Union
- eimì, an Ancient Greek verb meaning "to be"
- Kuwaiti Persian (or Eimi), an endangered language spoken in Kuwait
