= Kōta, Aichi =

Kōta 幸田町
- Town
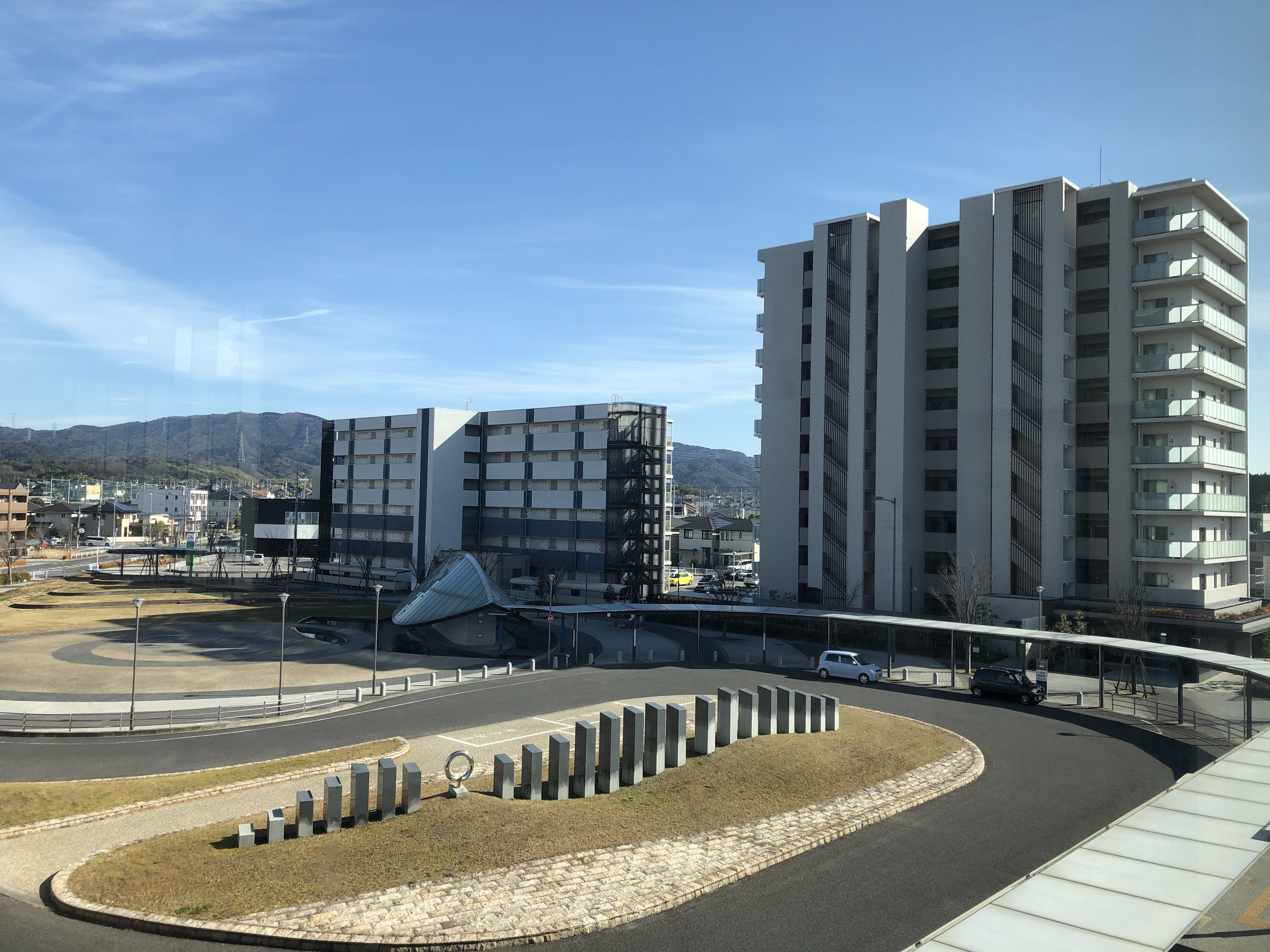
- Kōta Skyline

- Flag Seal

- Location of Kōta in Aichi Prefecture

- Coordinates: 34°51′52.2″N 137°9′56.4″E
- Country: Japan
- Region: Chūbu region Tōkai region
- Prefecture: Aichi
- District: Nukata

Area
  - Total: 56.72 km^{2} (21.90 sq mi)

Population (October 1, 2019)
  - Total: 42,200
  - Density: 744/km^{2} (1,930/sq mi)
- Time zone: UTC+9 (Japan Standard Time)
- Tree: Prunus serrulata
- Flower: Camellia
- Phone number: 0564-62-1111
- Address: Hishiike Kōta-chō, Nakata-gun, Aichi-ken 444-0192
- Website: Official website

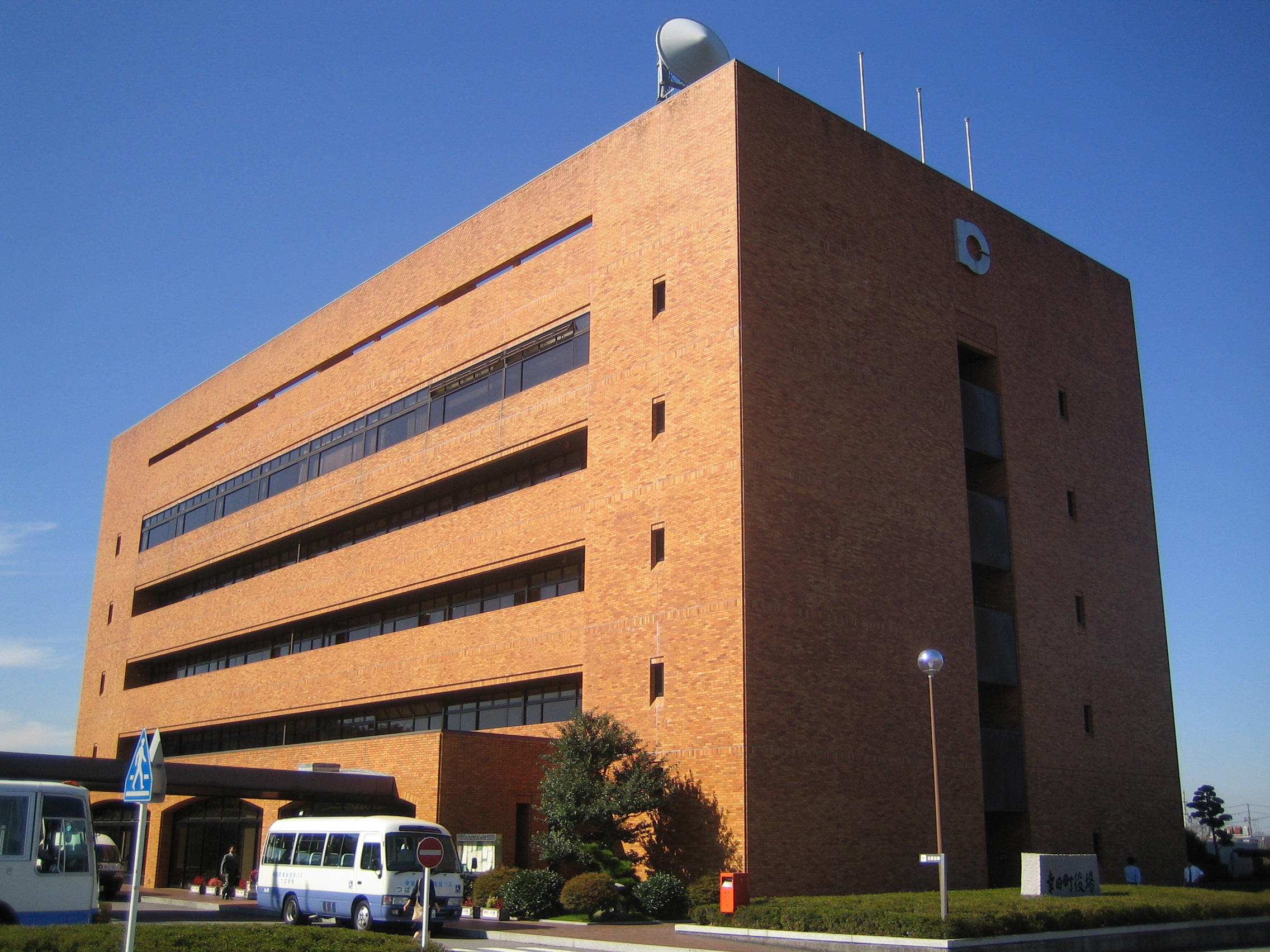
Kōta town hall

Kōta (幸田町, Kōta-chō) is a town located in Nukata District, Aichi Prefecture, in the Tōkai region of Japan. As of 1 October 2019, the town had an estimated population of 42,200 in 16,198 households, and a population density of 744 persons per km^{2}. The total area of the town was 56.72 square kilometres (21.90 sq mi).

Part of the town was called Kōda until 1954. It should not be confused with a district in the nearby city of Tahara, in the same prefecture, also called Koda (Koda-chō)

== Geography ==
Kōta is situated in south-central Aichi Prefecture.

=== Neighboring municipalities ===
- Aichi Prefecture
  - Gamagōri
  - Nishio
  - Okazaki

== Demographics ==
Per Japanese census data, the population of Kōta has been increasing over the past 70 years.

Historical population
Year	Pop.	±%
1940	12,157	—
1950	16,994	+39.8%
1960	16,467	−3.1%
1970	20,456	+24.2%
1980	26,163	+27.9%
1990	31,004	+18.5%
2000	33,408	+7.8%
2010	27,933	−16.4%

=== Climate ===
The town has a climate characterized by hot and humid summers, and relatively mild winters (Köppen climate classification Cfa). The average annual temperature in Kōta is 15.5 °C. The average annual rainfall is 1575 mm with September as the wettest month. The temperatures are highest on average in August, at around 27.5 °C, and lowest in January, at around 4.1 °C.

== History ==
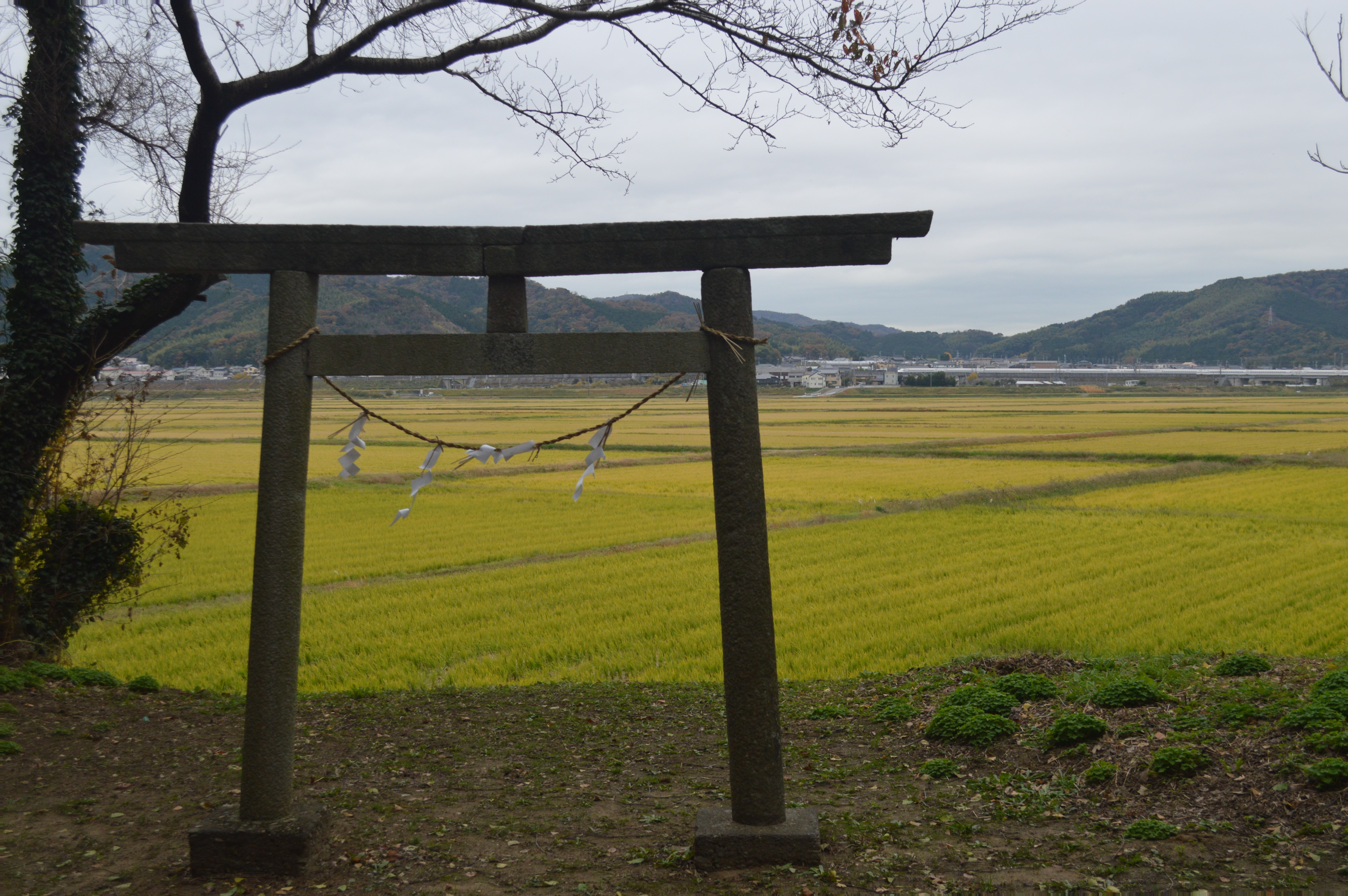
Ike jinja

Japanese Paleolithic period remains have been found in what is now Kōta, indicating settlement for many thousands of years. Jōmon period and Kofun period remains are plentiful. The area was part of western Mikawa Province under the Ritsuryō system, and organized into shōen under the control of Ise Shrine or the Fujiwara clan in the Heian period. It became a center for the Ikkō-ikki movement in the Sengoku period. Much of the area was under the control of Okazaki Domain under the Edo period Tokugawa shogunate and prospered due to its production of roof tiles, sake, edible oils and its position on the Tōkaidō highway. With the early Meiji period establishment of the modern municipalities system, the area was organized into villages within Nukata District, Aichi Prefecture. Kōda Village (広田村) was formed on May 1, 1906, through the merger of three smaller hamlets. It changed the kanji spelling of its name to the present version on July 28, 1909, with the opening of a train station on the Tōkaidō Main Line. The village was elevated to town status on April 1, 1952. On August 1, 1954, the town merged with former Toyosaka village from Hazu District, at which time it changed its transliteration from Kōda to Kōta. A new town hall was completed in 1985.

== Economy ==
Kōta is a center for manufacturing of automotive components and electronics, especially for Toyota and related companies. One of the more prominent factories in the town is Denso. Sony also has a large R&D and manufacturing complex, Sony Kohda TEC, in Sakazaki district. Agriculture is centered on greenhouse production, with strawberries as a major cash crop.

== Education ==
Kōta has six public elementary schools and three public middle schools operated by the town government, and one public high school operated by the Aichi Prefectural Board of Education.

== Transportation ==
=== Railway ===
Central Japan Railway Company - Tōkaidō Main Line

- Sangane • Kōda • Aimi

=== Highways ===
- National Route 23
- National Route 248

== Sister city relations ==
- Siem Reap, Cambodia

== Landmarks ==
- Yamakage Shinto headquarters

== Notable people from Kōta ==
- Matsudaira Ietada, Sengoku-period daimyō
- Natsume Yoshinobu, Sengoku-period samurai
