= Eimi Kuroda =

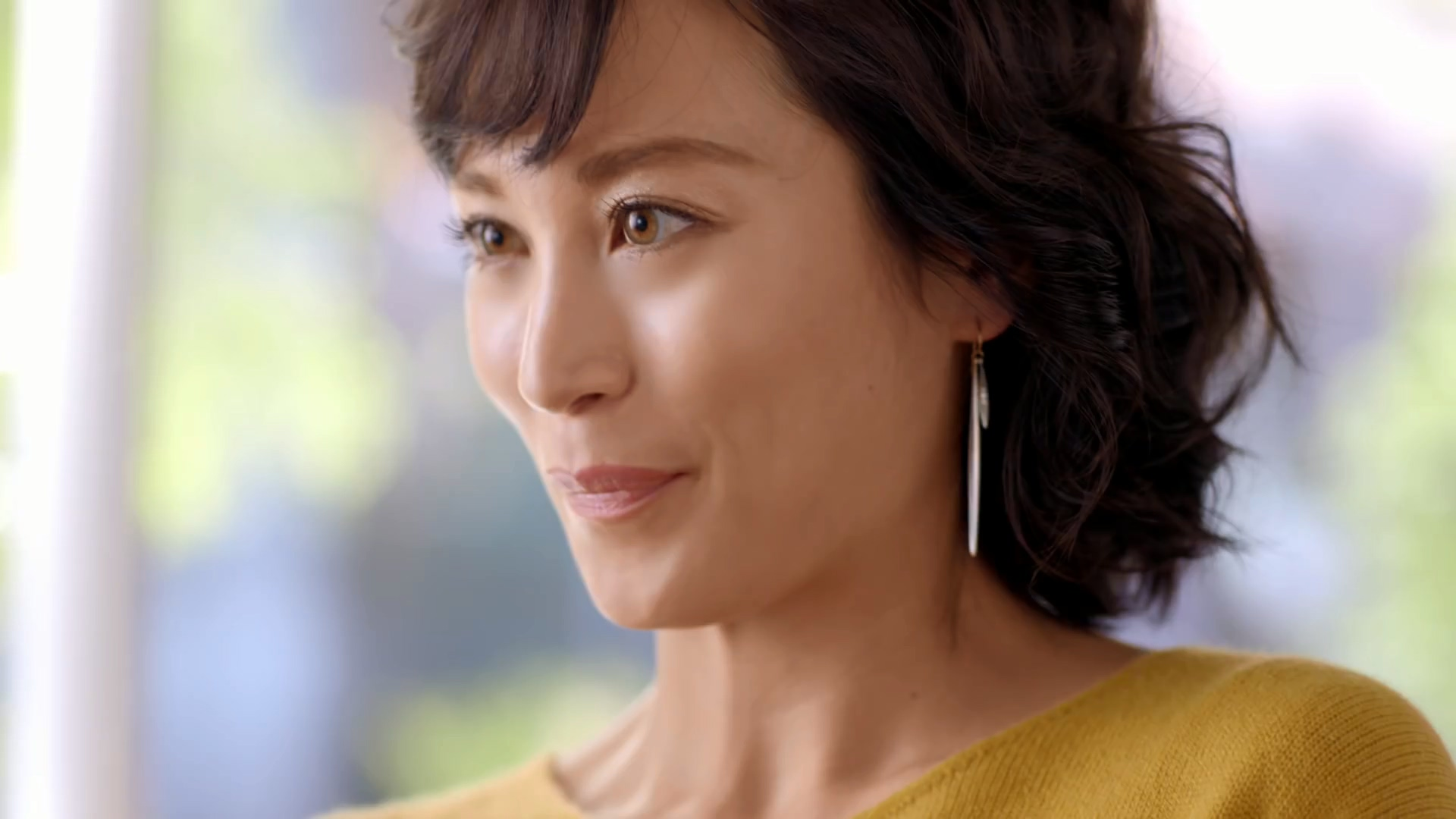
- Kuroda in 2016
- Born: May 14, 1988 (age 38); Saitama Prefecture, Japan
- Occupation: Model
- Modeling information
- Height: 173 cm (5 ft 8 in)
- Hair color: Brown
- Eye color: Hazel
- Agency: Asia Cross

Eimi Kuroda (黒田 エイミ, Kuroda Eimi; born May 14, 1988) is a Japanese fashion model from Saitama Prefecture. She is managed by Asia Cross.

== Biography ==
=== Personal life ===
Kuroda's father is Japanese and her mother is English. Her hobbies are listening to music and reading.

== Career ==
Kuroda has appeared in numerous fashion magazines and commercials in Japan.

=== Magazines ===
- Glamorous
- Classy
- Ginger
- Sweet
- Spring
- In Red
- Shel'tter
- Otona Look!s
- Voce
- Maquia
- Miss

=== Television commercials ===
- Moussy
- Adidas (China)

=== Photo books ===
- Gekkan Kuroda Eimi（May 14, 2010, Shinchosha Publishing Co., Ltd; Photography: Hajime Sawatari）ISBN 978-4107902177
