= Aimi Station =

Railway station in Kōta, Aichi Prefecture, Japan

CA51 Aimi Station 相見駅
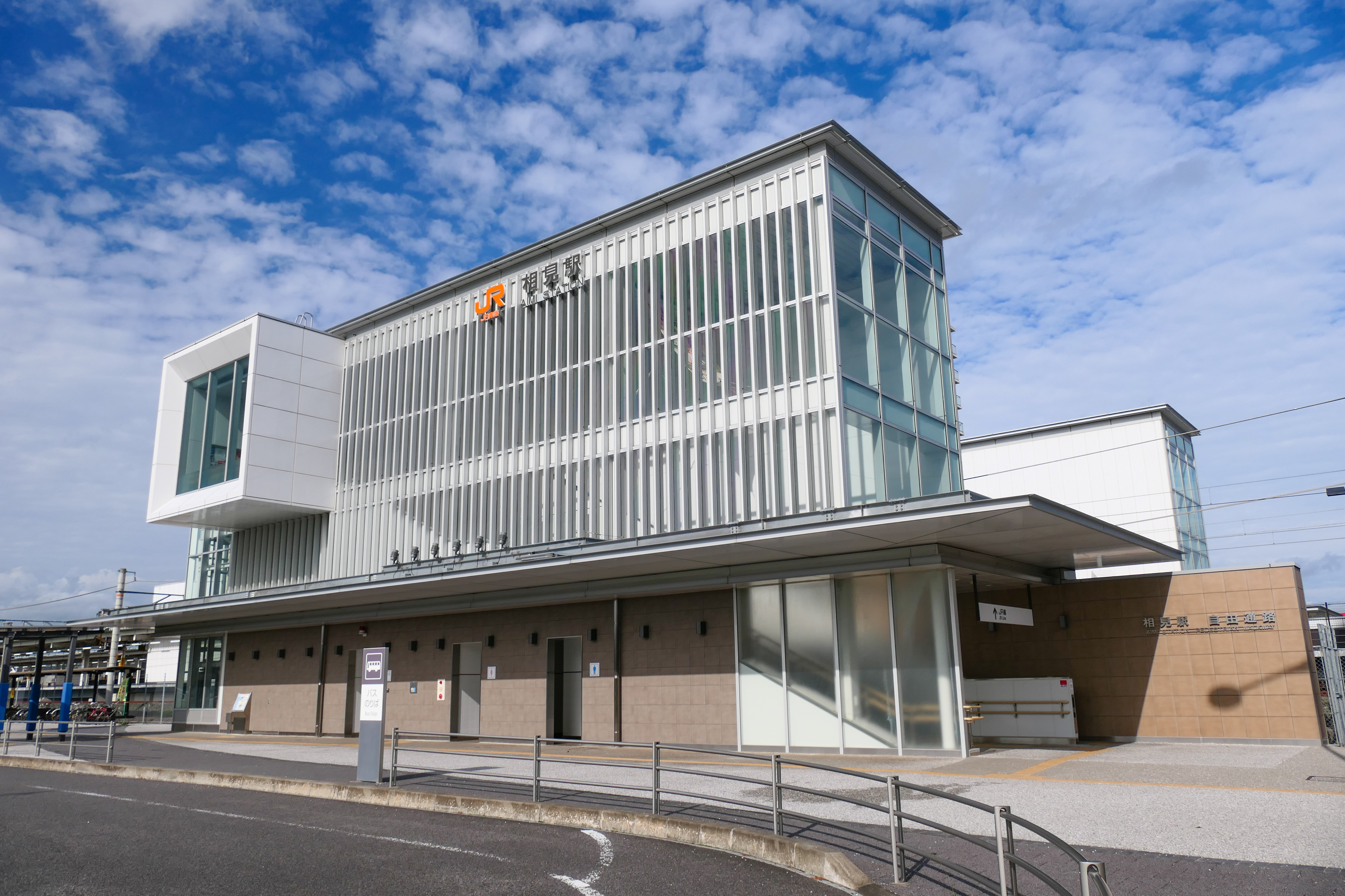
- The west side of the station in september 2021

General information
- Location: Hishiike, Kōta-chō, Nukata-gun, Aichi-ken 444-0113; Japan
- Coordinates: 34°53′14.23″N 137°9′37.14″E
- Operator: JR Central
- Line: Tokaido Main Line
- Distance: 321.6 kilometers from Tokyo
- Platforms: 1 island + 1 side platform
- Tracks: 3
- Connections: Bus stop

Other information
- Status: Unstaffed
- Station code: CA51

History
- Opened: 17 March 2012

Passengers
- 2023–2024: 3,223 daily
Location
- Location within Aichi Prefecture Location within Japan

Aimi Station (相見駅, Aimi-eki) is an infill railway station on the Tokaido Main Line in Kōta, Aichi, Japan, operated by the Central Japan Railway Company (JR Central). It opened on 17 March 2012.

== Lines ==
Aimi Station is located between Kōda and Okazaki on the Tokaido Main Line, 3.1 km (1.9 mi) from Kōda Station and 44.1 km (27.4 mi) from Nagoya Station.

== Station layout ==
The station consists of one island platform (platforms 1 and 2) and one side platform (platform 3) serving a total of three tracks. The station building has automated ticket machines, TOICA automated turnstiles and is unattended.

=== Platforms ===
| 1/2 | ■ Tokaido Main Line | for Okazaki and Nagoya |
| 3 | ■ Tokaido Main Line | for Toyohashi and Hamamatsu |

== Adjacent stations ==
| « | Service | » |
Tokaido Main Line
Special Rapid: Does not stop at this station
New Rapid: Does not stop at this station
Rapid: Does not stop at this station
Sectional Rapid: Does not stop at this station
| Kōda | Local | Okazaki |

== History ==
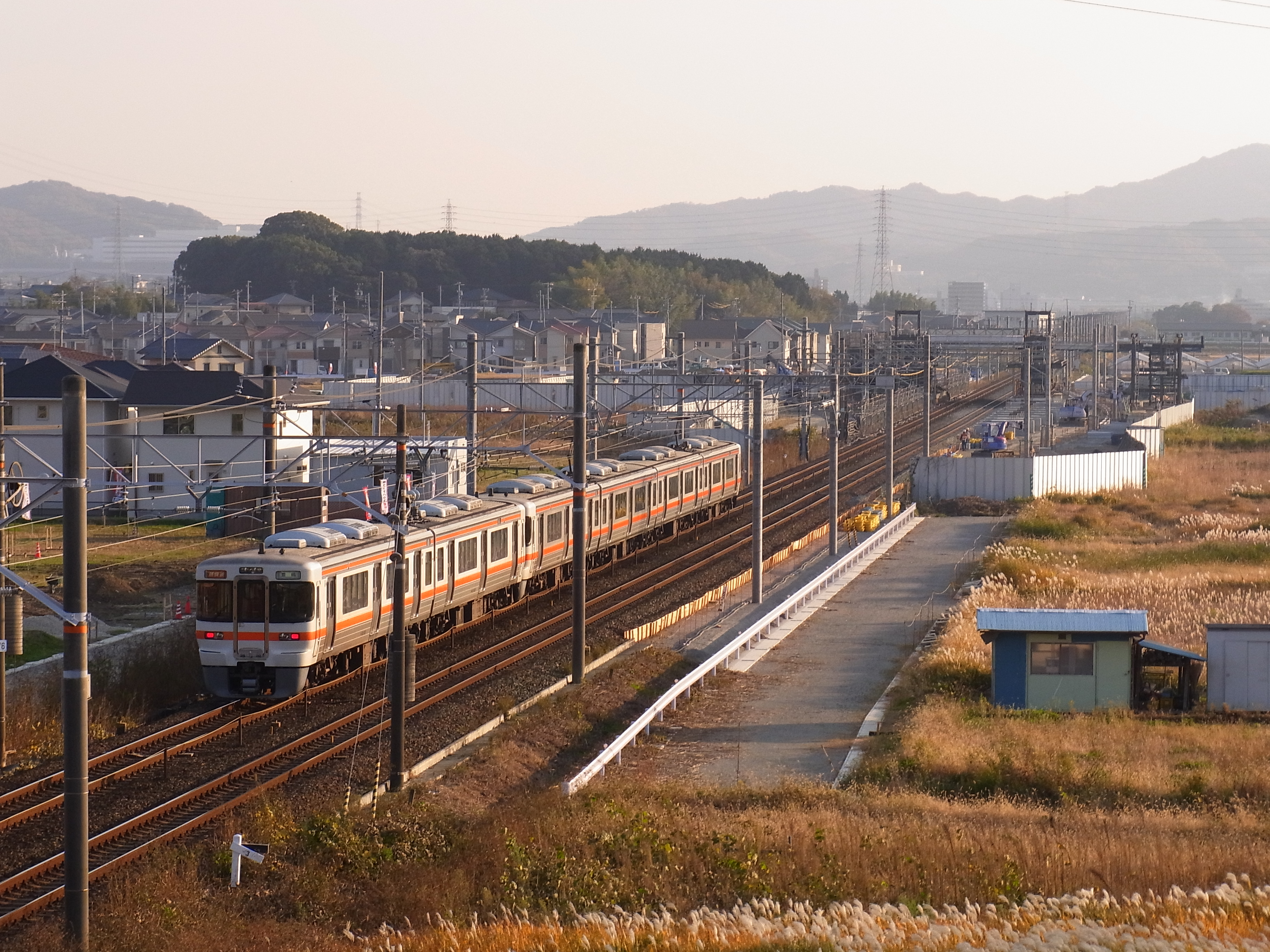
The station construction site in November 2010

The name of the new station was formally announced on 14 July 2011. It opened on 17 March 2012.

Station numbering was introduced to the section of the Tōkaidō Line operated JR Central in March 2018; Kōda Station was assigned station number CA51.

== Bus services ==
A bus service operated by Meitetsu Bus runs from Aimi Station to Kōda Station.

== Passenger statistics ==
In fiscal 2017, the station was used by an average of 1552 passengers daily (boarding passengers only).

== Surrounding area ==
- Aichi Prefectural Kōda High School
- Okazaki Fukuoka Junior High School

== See also ==
- List of railway stations in Japan
