= Ami Haruna =

Japanese model (born 1984)

- Born: October 25, 1984 (age 41); Tokyo, Japan
- Occupations: Model, Actress
- Years active: 2007–present
- Modeling information
- Height: 5 ft 5 in (165 cm)
- Hair color: Black
- Eye color: Brown

Ami Haruna (春名 あみ, Haruna Ami; born October 25, 1984) is a Los Angeles-based Japanese model and actress known for her appearances in Crazy, Stupid, Love (2011), The Gorburger Show (2012–2017) and The Newsroom (2016).

== Biography ==
Ami Haruna was born in Tokyo as a grand daughter of multiple Award winning writer Komao Furuyama. she started taking ballet at the age of four. She continued to dance through high school and even placed silver at the Tony Tee World Dance Competition. She soon got an early start in modeling and acting for a diet chocolate commercial when she was fourteen. Haruna spent highschool in Los Angeles and Haruna graduated college with a BA in Performing Arts in Japan, then Media and Communication and Psychology in California. She permanently moved to Los Angeles where she began modeling worldwide for ads such as Nike, Inc., Shiseido, Bose and Southwest Airlines. She gained further recognition as actress for starring in Crazy, Stupid, Love along with Ryan Gosling and Steve Carell.

After COVID hit Los Angeles she became a famous streamer globally for the live streaming app 17LIVE. She was the Top Streamer of US region in the app for three years, and won the title "Queen of Livit" every year and the best streamer award.

== Personal life ==
Her grandfather is well known writer who has won the Akutagawa Prize and multiple awards. She has a son and a Pomeranian dog named Coconut. Haruna maintains her profile through Instagram and Facebook. She is fluent in English, Japanese and Korean.

She was engaged to Kris Kristofferson's son Jesse in 2006.

== Filmography ==
Film roles
Year	Title	Role	Notes
2010	10 Oku-en Kasegu	Herself	Documentary
2010	The Last Man Standing	Snow mo bunny	Short film
2011	Crazy, Stupid, Love	Ami	
2012	Seeking a Friend for the End of the World	Kissing Waitress	
2012	Savages	Annie	Uncredited
2015	The Wedding Ringer	Bachelor Party Girl	
2015	The Sea of Trees	Japanese Game Show Host	
2018	Swipe Left	Lihwa Om	

Television roles
Year	Title	Role	Notes
2010	Wipeout	Herself	Episode: "Ladies Night"
2011–2012	Mash Up	Model	2 episodes
2012	The Newsroom	Japanese Anchor	Episode: "Bullies"
2012	Happy Endings	Jill	Episode: "More Like Stanksgiving"
2012	RVC: The Lone Shopping Network	Waitress	Episode: "Father of My Squids"
2012–2017	The Gorburger Show	Yoko	3 episodes
2013	Loiter Squad	Japanese Pop Star	Episode: "How Stella Got Her Groove"
2014	The Eric Andre Show	Japanese Host as Ami Haruna	Episode: "The Hannibal Buress Show"
2015	Tosh.0	Blackheads Game Wife	Episode: "Angelo Garcia, He-Man"
2015	Exit Strategy	Club Hostess	TV movie
