= Megu Fujigamori =

Japanese fashion model and hostess

- 藤ヶ森めぐ
- Born: September 17, 1988 (age 37); Chiba, Japan
- Other names: Genji name : Alice Serisawa; Nickname : Fujimegu
- Occupations: Fashion model, hostess
- Known for: Appearing in Koakuma Ageha
- Height: 1.67 m (5 ft 6 in) as of 2013

Megu Fujigamori (藤ヶ森 めぐ, Fujigamori Megu; born September 17, 1988) is a Japanese cabaret hostess, and fashion model best known for appearing in the Koakuma Ageha cabaret-gyaru fashion magazine. A hostess living in Kyoto with genji name "Alice Serisawa" (芹沢 ありす, Serisawa Arisu), she has regularly appeared in Koakuma Ageha as one of its main models since 2011, and in the magazine, she is commonly referred to by her nickname "Fujimegu" (藤めぐ).

== Biography ==
=== Career in modeling ===
Fujigamori made her debut in Koakuma Ageha as a hostess working at a Kyoto hostess bar, and had gained considerable popularity in the magazine by early 2011. She signed an exclusive contract with the magazine in 2011, making her first appearance on the cover for its July 2011 issue along with seasoned Ageha model Rina Sakurai.

=== Career in nightwork ===
Fujigamori began her nightwork career at the age of 18 after emigrating from her hometown Chiba to Kyoto. She had worked at a high-class hostess bar located in Gion, Kyoto until around the time of her debut in Koakuma Ageha and move to another Kyoto hostess bar. She, since age 18, has worked at "Reve" in Kyoto, "Kaguya Club" in Gion, and "Zoo" in Kyoto.

== Personal life ==
Fujigamori was born in Chiba, Japan, as the youngest of three sisters. Her parents divorced just after her graduation from high school. She moved to Kyoto at the age of 18. She is noted in Koakuma Ageha for her lavish lifestyle, as she resides in a luxurious hotel with her average weekly expenditure of over ¥500,000 (≈ AU$6,102 ≈ CA$5,980 ≈ SG$7,764 ≈ UK£3,802 ≈ US$6,033). Her glitzy lifestyle has become a featured subject on several occasions in the magazine, such as in its special edit "Butterfly and Money" (ちょうちょと金, Choucho to Kane) for its February 2011 issue.
