= Afeka College of Engineering =

Public college in Tel Aviv, Israel

Coordinates: 32.115046°N 34.817779°E

Afeka
- אפקה - המכללה האקדמית להנדסה בתל אביב
- Type: Public; Technical
- Established: 1996
- President: Prof. Ami Moyal
- Vice-president: Alon Barnea
- Academic staff: 200
- Students: 2,600
- Undergraduates: 2,300
- Postgraduates: 300
- Location: Tel Aviv, Israel
- Campus: Urban
- Website: afeka.ac.il

The Afeka — The Academic College of Engineering in Tel Aviv (Hebrew: אפקה - המכללה האקדמית להנדסה בתל אביב) is a public college in Tel Aviv, Israel. Afeka was established in 1996 and grants Bachelor and Masters degrees in engineering. The college offers 5 undergraduate programs with 17 fields of specialization as well as 5 graduate programs.

== History ==
Afeka was founded in 1996 and is certified by the Israeli Council for Higher Education.

== Academics ==
Afeka combines engineering programs with an emphasis on entrepreneurship. Programs at Afeka include electrical and electronic engineering; mechanical engineering; software engineering; industrial engineering and management; medical engineering, systems engineering, energy engineering, and engineering and management of service systems Master of Science programmes.

=== Rankings ===
In June 2021, Afeka was ranked 9th worldwide in the COVID-19 crisis management category of the World Universities Ranking with Impact (WURI).

== Presidents ==
- 1996-2001 - Elhanan Eilat
- 2002-2014 - Prof. Mordechai (Moti) Sokolov
- 2014-2025 - Prof. Ami Moyal
- 2025-Today - Prof. Yossi Rosenwaks

== See also ==
- List of Israeli universities and colleges
- Education in Israel
- Science and technology in Israel
