= Manaka (surname) =

Manaka (written: 真中 or 眞中) is a Japanese surname. Notable people with the surname include:

- Edgar Manaka (born 1989), South African soccer player
- Matsemela Manaka (1956–1998), South African playwright, poet, and artist
- Mikio Manaka (眞中 幹夫, born 1969), Japanese footballer
- Mitsuru Manaka (真中 満, born 1971), Japanese baseball player
- Nomsa Manaka (born 1965), South African dancer, choreographer, and actress
- Yasuo Manaka (眞中 靖夫, born 1971), Japanese footballer

Fictional characters:

- Laala Manaka (真中 らぁら), protagonist of the anime series PriPara

== See also ==
- Ted Manakas (born 1951), American former professional basketball player
