= 愛美 =

愛美 or 爱美 is an Asian feminine given name meaning "love, beauty".

It may refer to:

- Aimi (actress) (愛美, born 1991), Japanese voice actress and singer
- Ami (given name)
- Emi (given name)
- Manami (given name)
- Mok Oi Mei (莫愛美), character in Hong Kong drama Armed Reaction II
- Seet Ai Mee (薛爱美; born 1943), former Singaporean politician

== See also ==
- 愛未 (disambiguation)
