= Hajime Sawatari =

Japanese photographer

Hajime Sawatari (沢渡 朔, Sawatari Hajime; born 1940) is a Japanese photographer. He is known for his fashion and advertising photography as well as his nudes of girls and women. He earned his degree from Nihon University's College of Art with a major in photography.

== Biography ==
Sawatari won the Japan Photograph Association's Nendo Sho (Annual Award) of 1973 for his book Nadia, which visually documents his romantic relationship with the Italian fashion model Nadia Galli. He won their 1979 award for Alice from the Sea. In 1990 he won the Kodansha Publication Culture Award in Photography for Taste of Honey.

His photographs have been exhibited by many institutions including Ginza Wacoal Hall and the National Museum of Modern Art, Tokyo.

His book Alice, an interpretation of Lewis Carroll's Alice's Adventures in Wonderland, is controversial for its full-frontal nudity of a prepubescent girl.

== Books ==
- Nadia: Mori no Ningyokan. Japan: Camera Mainichi / Mainichishinbun-sha, 1973. Reprint edition: Japan: Asahi Sonorama, 1977. Excerpt edition: Nadia in Sicily 1971 Ricochet, 2004
- Alice / Arisu. Tokyo, Japan, 1973
- Seiji Ozawa. Japan: Shueisha, 1975
- Alice from the Sea. Tokyo, Japan: Kawade Shobō Shinsha, 1979
- Taste of Honey. IPC, 1990 (with Amy Yamada)
- A Girl. Japan: Hysteric Glamour, 2000
- Nadia [B&W & Color, 2 vol. set], Tokyo: Akio Nagasawa Publishing, 2016
