= Ami Moyal =

Israeli engineer and academic

- עמי מויאל
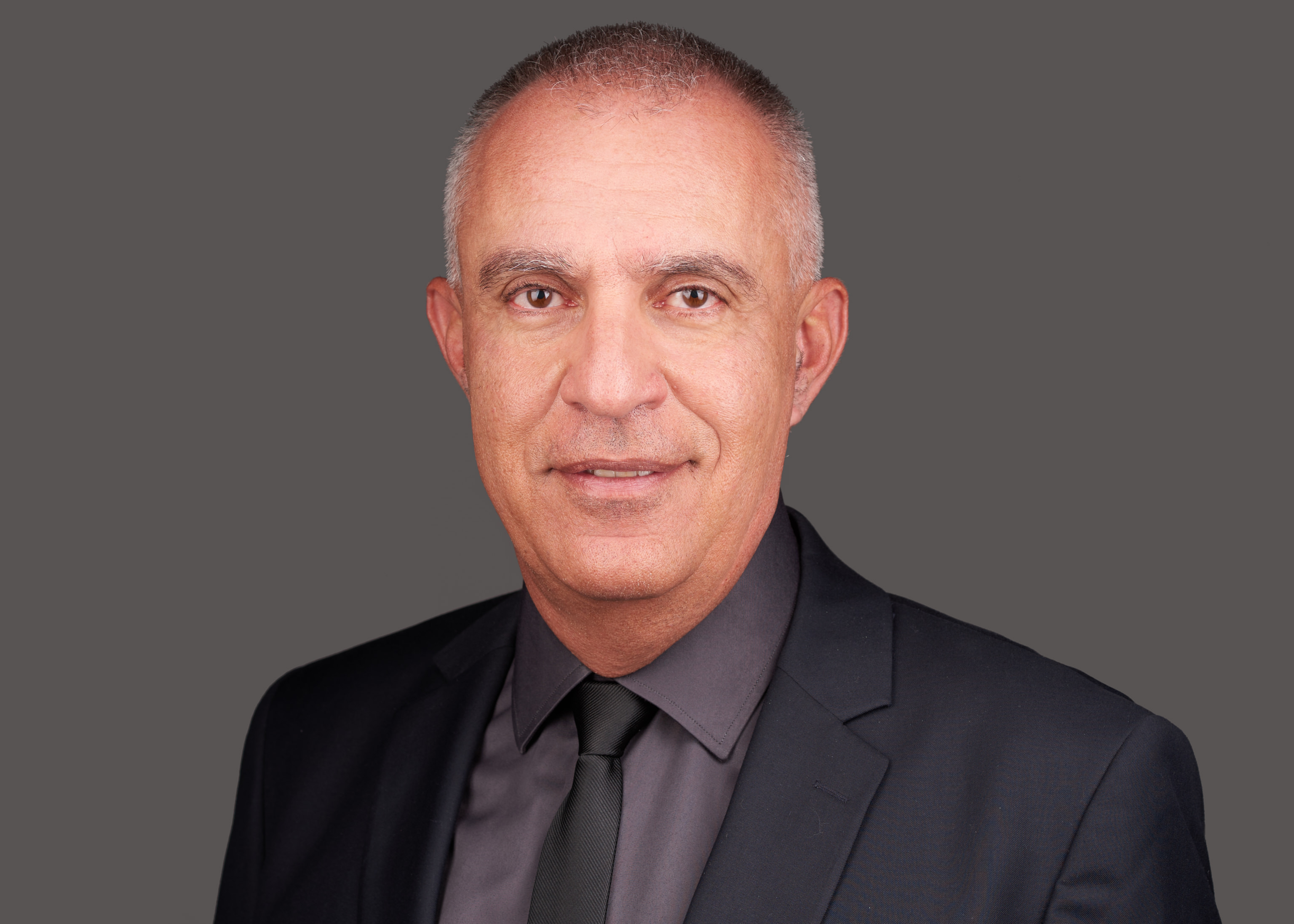
- Prof. Ami Moyal, 3rd President of Afeka Tel Aviv Academic College of Engineering
- Education: Ben-Gurion University of the Negev
- Known for: Speech recognition
- Scientific career
- Fields: College president, electrical engineer
- Workplaces: Afeka Tel Aviv Academic College of Engineering

Ami Moyal (Hebrew: עמי מויאל; born June 22, 1962) is the third president of Afeka Tel Aviv Academic College of Engineering. He is a professor in electrical and computer engineering and expert in the field of human machine interaction via speech recognition.

== Biography ==
Moyal was born and raised in the city of Ashdod, Israel. He completed a science-technology high school matriculation, served as a radar technician in the Israel Defense Forces and completed three engineering degrees. He then began a career in the Israeli high-tech industry after which he transitioned to academia.

== Education ==
Moyal holds a Ph.D. degrees in electrical and computer engineering from Ben-Gurion University of the Negev, Beer-Sheva, Israel. He was awarded his Ph.D. in 1993, specializing in speech recognition, with his doctoral thesis titled "Phoneme Recognition from Continuous Speech". In 2017, he was granted the Ben-Gurion University "Honorary Alumni Award".

== Career ==
=== Industry ===
From 1993 and 2008 he worked for Natural Speech Communication Ltd. (NSC), a developer of speech recognition products for telephony. At NSC he held various positions, including CEO of the company for seven years.

=== Public service ===
Between 2007 and 2011 Moyal served as Chairman of the Board of Directors for ISEF – Israel Scholarship Education Foundation, an organization providing equal access opportunities for education to underserved communities in Israel. In 2010 he was granted the Safra Award for Excellence and Contribution to Israeli Society ).

=== Academia ===
In 2008, Moyal joined the Department of Electrical Engineering at Afeka Tel Aviv Academic College of Engineering. He also founded and led the Afeka Center for Language Processing (ACLP) – a research and development center for spoken and written language processing. In 2011 he was appointed Associate Professor and in 2014, Full Professor. From 2009 - 2014 he served as Head of the department and in November 2014 was elected President of the College .

== Selected publications ==
=== Books ===
- Moyal, A., Aharonson, V., Tetariy, E., & Gishri, M. (2013). Phonetic Search Methods for Large Speech Databases. New York: Springer.

=== Peer-reviewed papers ===
- Silber-Varod, V., Latin, M., & Moyal, A. (2017). Frequency of Hebrew phonemes and phoneme clusters in a data-driven approach. Literacy and Language, 5, 22–36.
- Lapidot, I., Shoa, A., Furmanov, T., Aminov, L., Moyal, A., & Bonastre, J.-F. (2017). Generalized Viterbi-based models for time-series segmentation and clustering applied to speaker diarization. Computer Speech & Language, 1–20.
- Tetariy, E., Bar-Yosef, Y., Gishri, M., Alon-Lavi, R., Aharonson, V., Opher, I., & Moyal, A. (2016). Cross-language phoneme mapping for phonetic search keyword spotting using multiple source languages. Artificial Intelligence Research, 2, 24–42.
- Tetariy, E., Bar-Yosef, Y., Silber-Varod, V., Gishri, M., Alon-Lavi, R., Aharonson, V., & Moyal, A. (2015). Cross-language phoneme mapping for phonetic search keyword spotting in continuous speech of under-resourced languages. Artificial Intelligence Research, 2, 72–82.
- Tetariy, E., Gishri, M., Har-Lev, B., Aharonson, V., & Moyal, A. (2012). An efficient lattice-based phonetic search method for accelerating keyword spotting in large speech databases. International Journal of Speech Technology, 2, 161–169.
