= Manaka (given name) =

Manaka (written: 愛風, 舞菜香 or まなか in hiragana) is a feminine Japanese given name. Notable people with the name include:

- Manaka Hayashi (林 愛花; born 2004), Japanese professional footballer
- Manaka Inaba (稲場 愛香; born 1997), Japanese former member ot the Juice=Juice
- Manaka Inagawa (伊奈川 愛菓; born 1991), Japanese shogi player
- Manaka Iwami (石見 舞菜香; born 1998), Japanese voice actress
- Manaka Matsukubo (松窪 真心; born 2004), Japanese footballer
- Manaka Matsumoto (松本 茉奈加; born 1999), Japanese footballer
- Manaka Ranaka (born 1979), South African actress
- Manaka Senri (千里 愛風; born 1979), Japanese singer
- Manaka Shida (志田 愛佳; born 1998), Japanese former member ot the Sakurazaka46
- Manaka Taguchi (田口 愛佳; born 2003), Japanese singer

Fictional characters:

- Manaka Sajyou, a character from the original Fate/stay night light novel, Fate/Prototype: Fragments of Sky Silver
- Manaka Ujīe, a minor character in Haikyū!!
- Manaka Mukaido (向井戸 まなか), a character in the anime series Nagi no Asukara
- Manaka Komaki (小牧 愛佳), a character in the visual novel series To Heart 2
