= Nobuo Matsunaga =

Japanese footballer and manager

Nobuo Matsunaga 松永 信夫
Personal information
- Full name: Nobuo Matsunaga
- Date of birth: December 6, 1921
- Place of birth: Shida District, Shizuoka, Empire of Japan
- Date of death: September 25, 2007 (aged 85)
- Place of death: Fujieda, Shizuoka, Japan
- Position: Midfielder

Youth career
- Shida High School

College career
Years	Team	Apps	(Gls)
- Tokyo Liberal Arts and Science University

Senior career*
Years	Team	Apps	(Gls)
- Nippon Light Metal

International career
1954–1955	Japan	4	(0)

Managerial career
- Nippon Light Metal
- * Club domestic league appearances and goals

Nobuo Matsunaga (松永 信夫, Matsunaga Nobuo; December 6, 1921 – September 25, 2007) was a Japanese footballer and manager. He played for the Japan national team. His brother Akira Matsunaga and Seki Matsunaga also played for Japan national team.

== Club career ==
Matsunaga was born in Shida District, Shizuoka on December 6, 1921. After graduating from Tokyo Liberal Arts and Science University, he played for Nippon Light Metal.

== National team career ==
In March 1954, Matsunaga was selected by the Japan national team for the 1954 World Cup qualification. On March 14, he debuted against South Korea. He also played at 1954 Asian Games. He played 4 games for Japan until 1955.

== Coaching career ==
After retirement, Matsunaga became a manager for Nippon Light Metal. In 1972, he promoted the club to a new division, Japan Soccer League Division 2.

On September 25, 2007, Matsunaga died of lymphoma in Fujieda at the age of 85.

== National team statistics ==
Japan national team
Year	Apps	Goals
1954	3	0
1955	1	0
Total	4	0
