= Shida Gunga ruins =

Archeological site

- 志太郡衙跡 (Japanese)
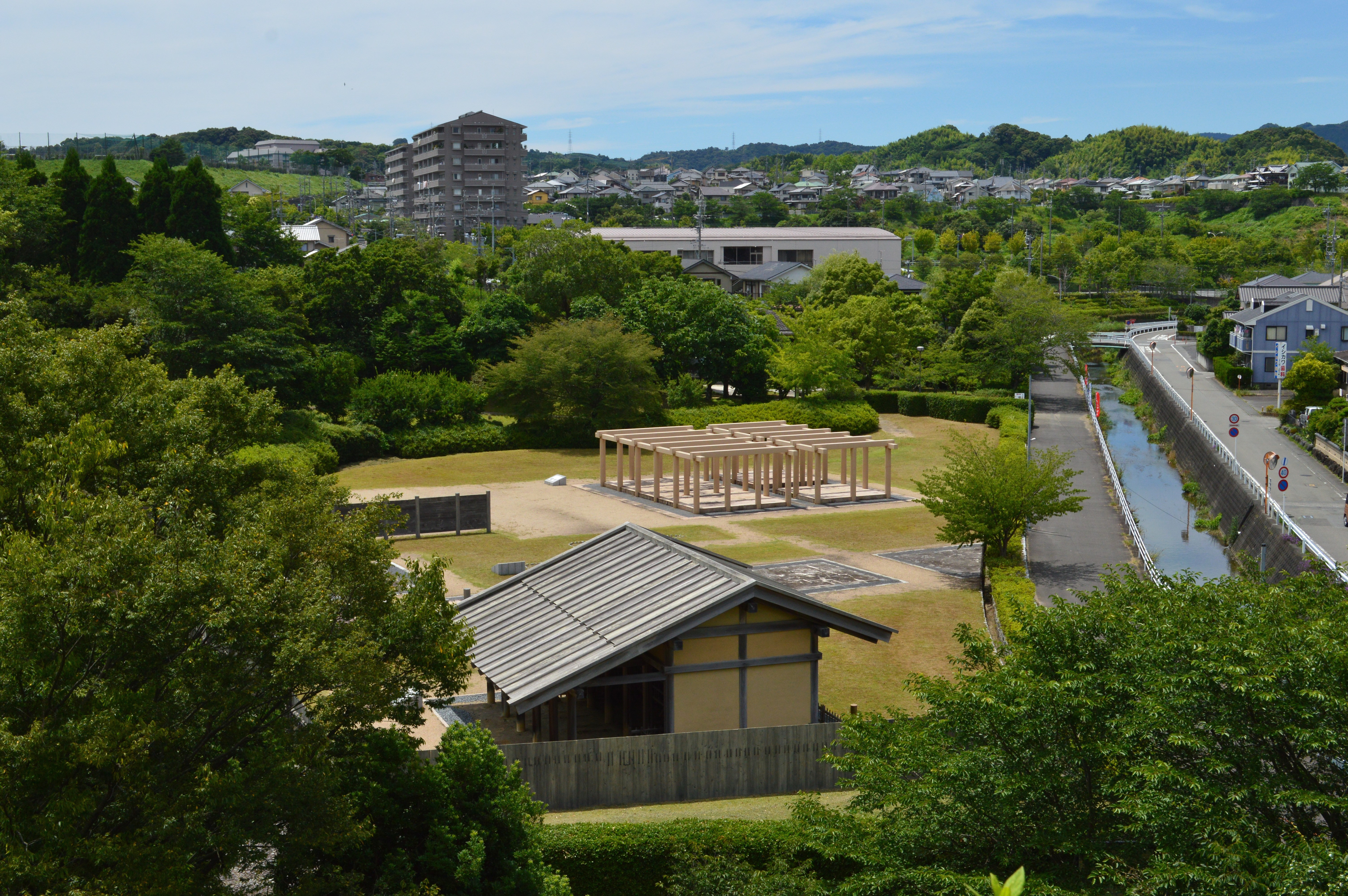

- Shida Gunga ruins Shida Gunga ruins (Japan)
- 34°51′43.68″N 138°14′33.81″E
- Type: settlement
- Periods: Nara to Heian period
- Location: Fujieda, Shizuoka, Japan
- Region: Tōkai region

Site notes
- Public access: Yes (park)

The Shida Gunga ruins (志太郡衙跡, Shida-gunga-ato) is an archaeological site containing the ruins of the Nara to early Heian period government administrative complex for Shiga District, Suruga Province, located in the Minamisurugadai neighborhood of the city of Fujieda, Shizuoka in the Tōkai region of Japan. The site was designated a National Historic Site of Japan in 1980.

Gunga are ancient Japanese administrative buildings.

== Overview ==
In the late Nara period, after the establishment of a centralized government under the Ritsuryō system and Taika Reforms, local rule over the provinces was standardized under a kokufu (provincial capital), and each province was divided into smaller administrative districts, known as (郡, gun, kōri), composed of 2–20 townships in 715 AD. Each of the units had an administrative complex built on a semi-standardized layout based on contemporary Chinese design.

The Shida Gunga ruins are located in a hilly valley on the north side of the delta formed by the Ōi River on the west bank of Suruga Bay. The valley has a width of about 100 meters and extends for about 150 meters, with the site located at the highest elevation within the valley. The ruins were discovered during construction work on a housing development in 1977 and was excavated starting in 1980. The foundations of 30 buildings, with a well, gates, and roads were uncovered. The site was compactly arranged on narrow alluvial land measuring 80 meters east-to-west and 60 meters north-to-south. The complex was destroyed in rebuilt several times throughout the Heian period. The eastern side of the site had an earthen rampart with a wooden palisade, but this was replaced by the 8th century by a group of densely packed granaries, with only small fenced section in the southeast corner. A road with a width of four to six meters ran outside a wooden palisade on the southern side, and there was a gate in the western wooden palisade.

Artifacts included roof tiles and numerous items, such as farm implements, dolls, wooden tags, and over 200 pieces of Haji ware, Sue ware pottery and lacquer with the word "Shida" written in black ink. Together with the layout of the ruins, it was determined that this was the government center for Shida County from the early 8th to late 9th century. The housing development project was cancelled, and site was made into an archaeological park, with reconstructed buildings and a museum. the Shida Gunga Ruins Museum (志太郡衙資料館, Shida Gunga Shiryōkan). The site is a three minute walk from "Fujieda Health Center Mae" on the Shizutetsu Justline Bus from Fujieda Station.

== Gallery ==
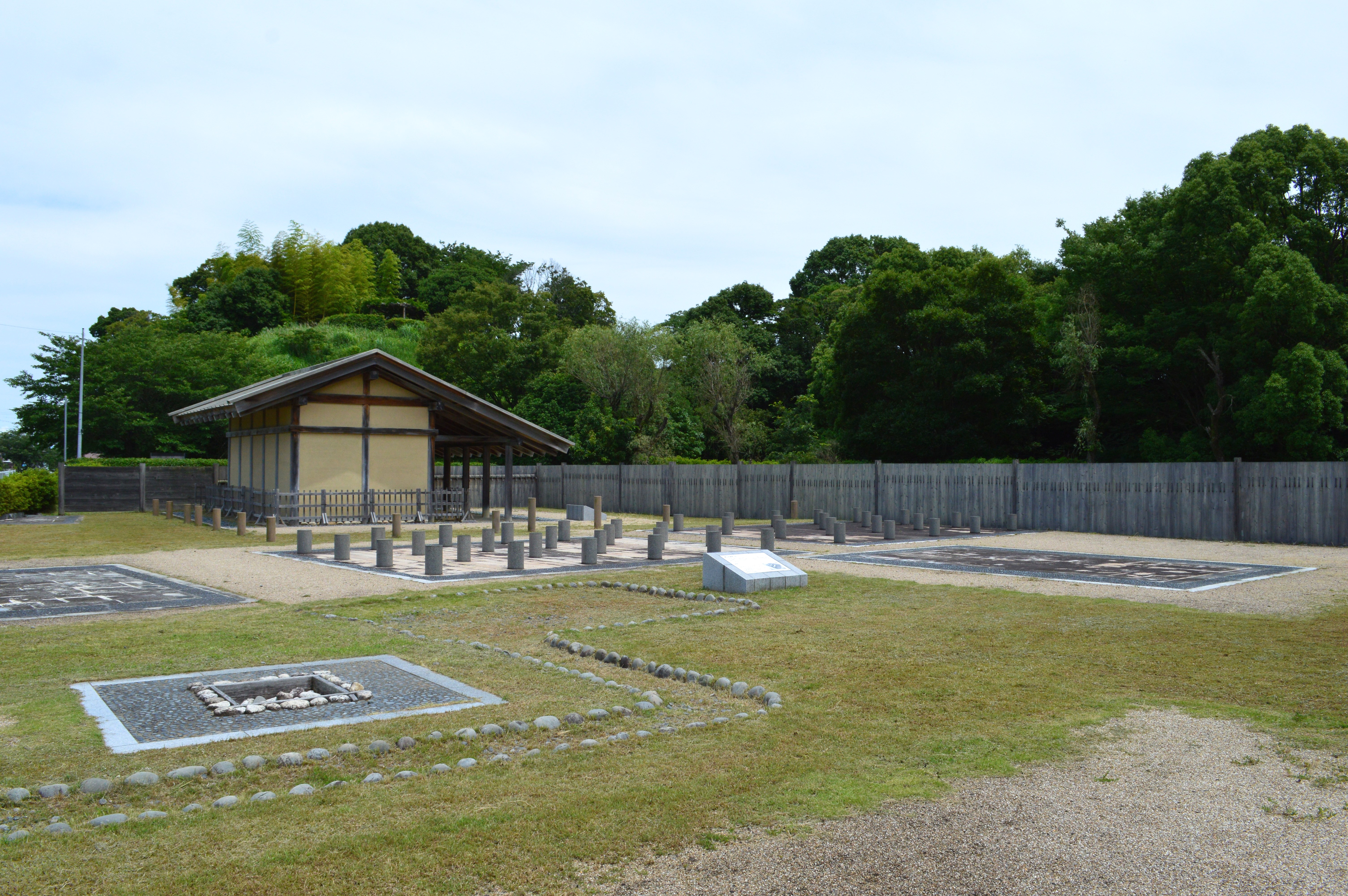
Well

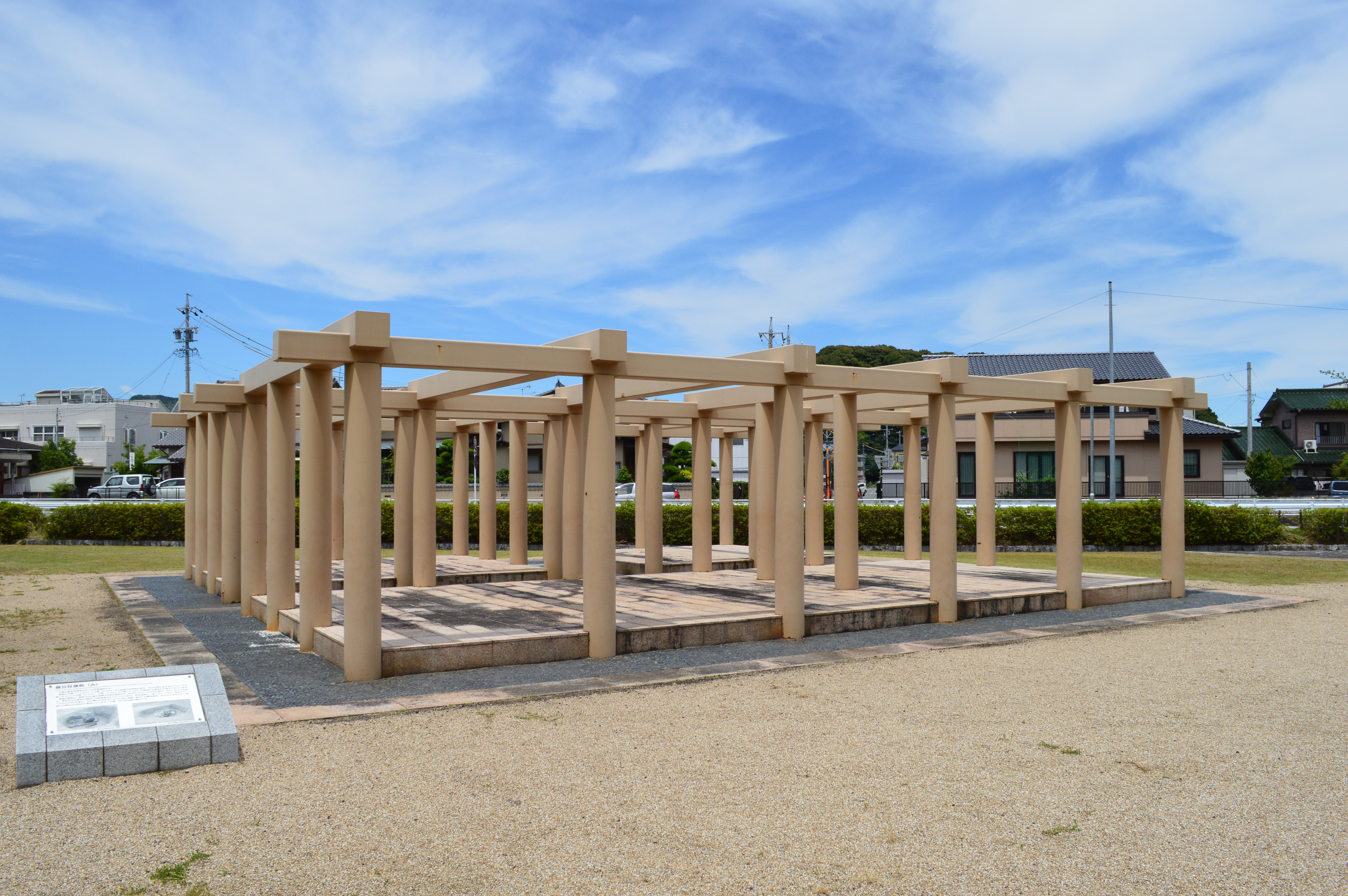
Building under reconstruction

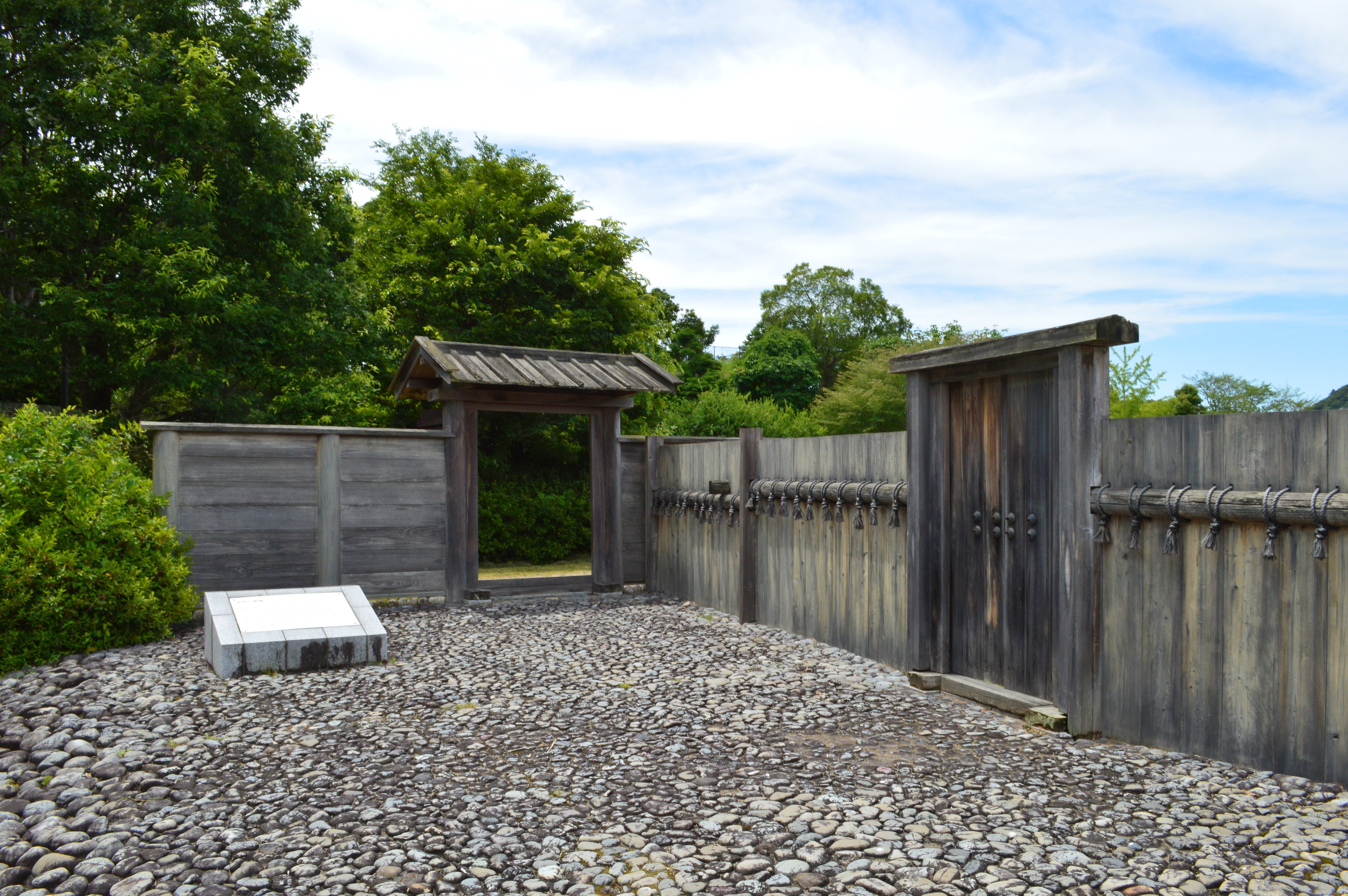
Reconstructed gate and palisade

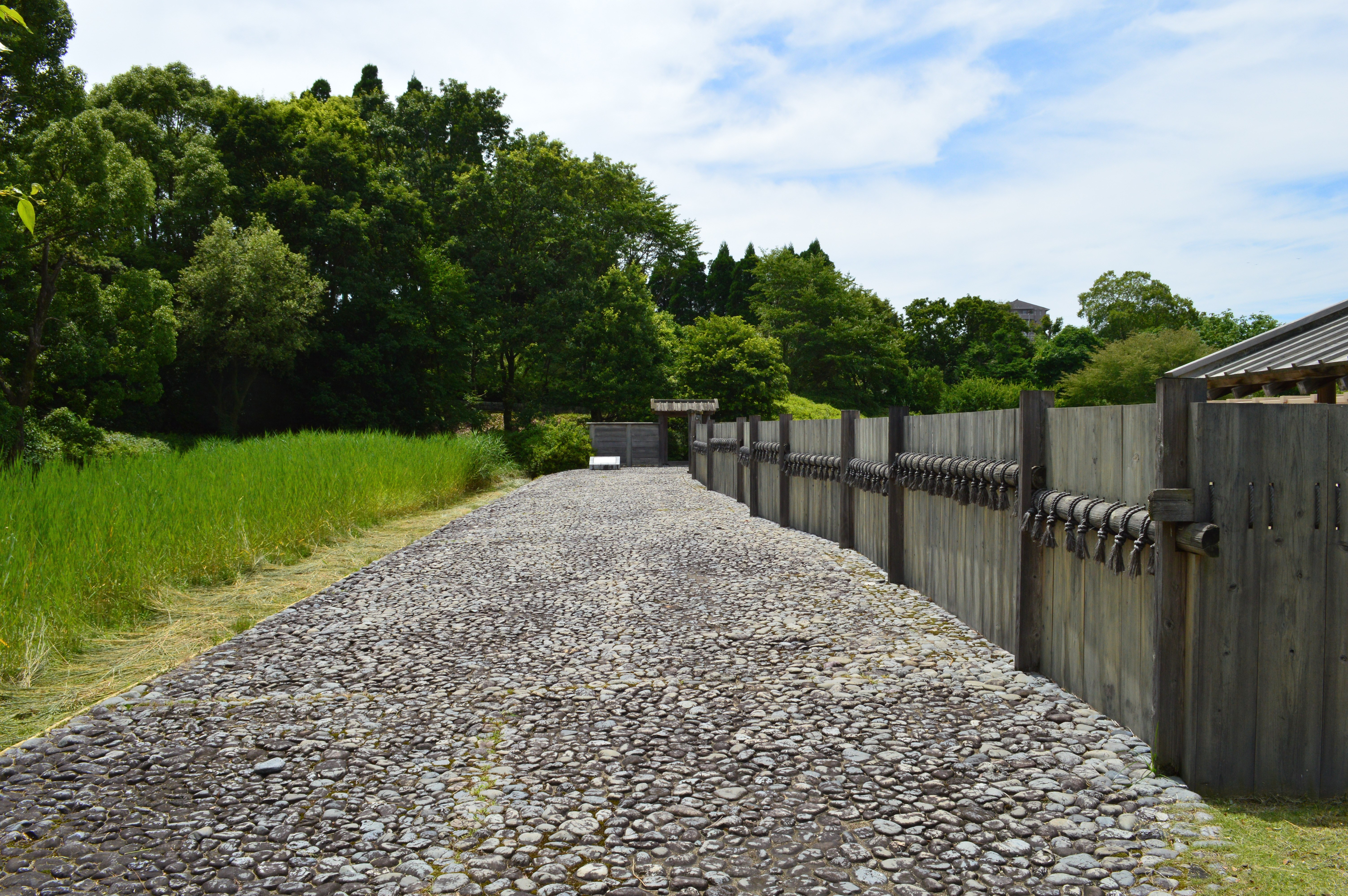
reconstructed road

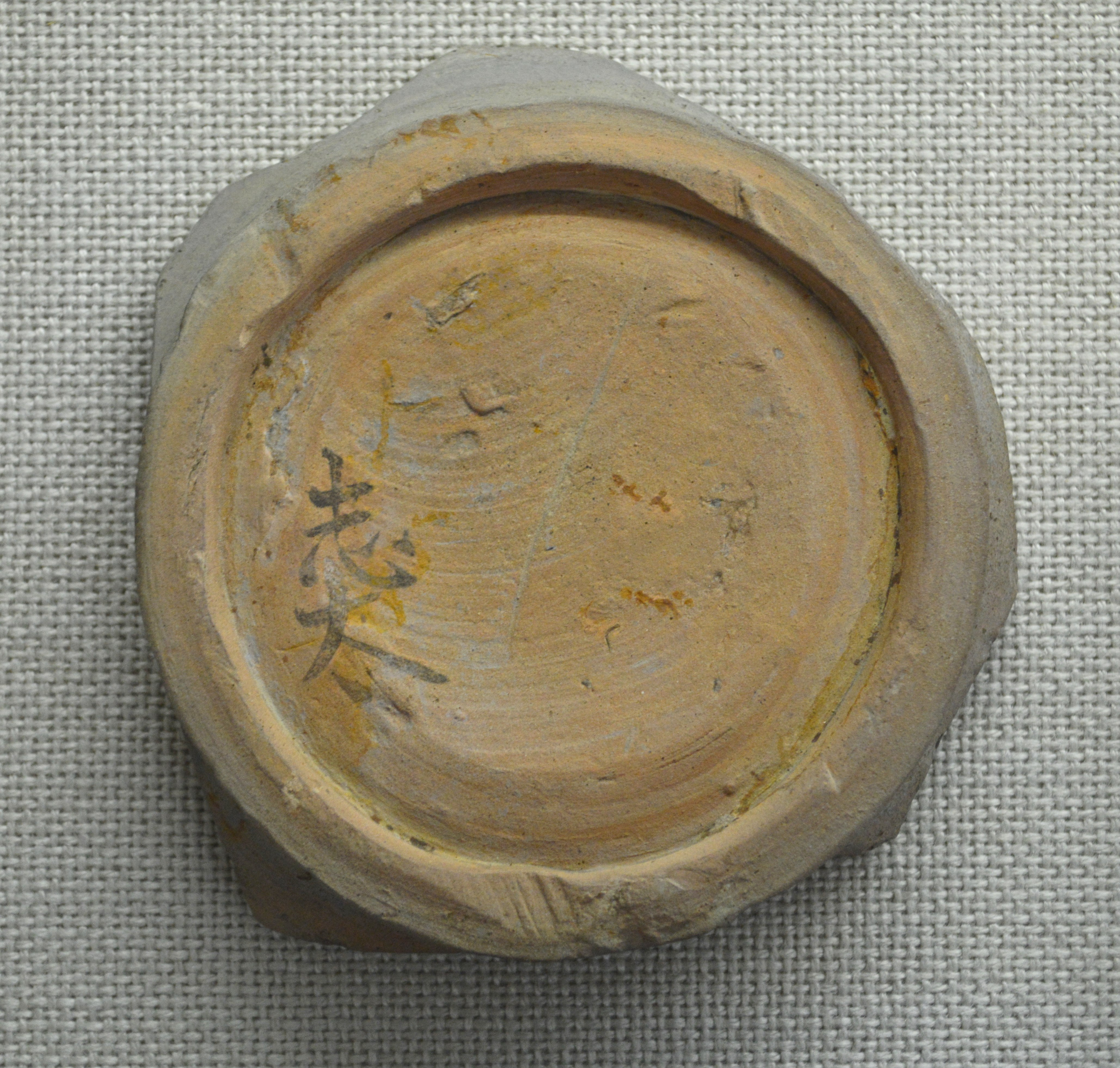
pottery fragment with "Shida" inscription

== See also ==
- List of Historic Sites of Japan (Shizuoka)
