= Ōigawa, Shizuoka =

Ōigawa Japanese: 大井川町
- Former municipality
- Flag Seal

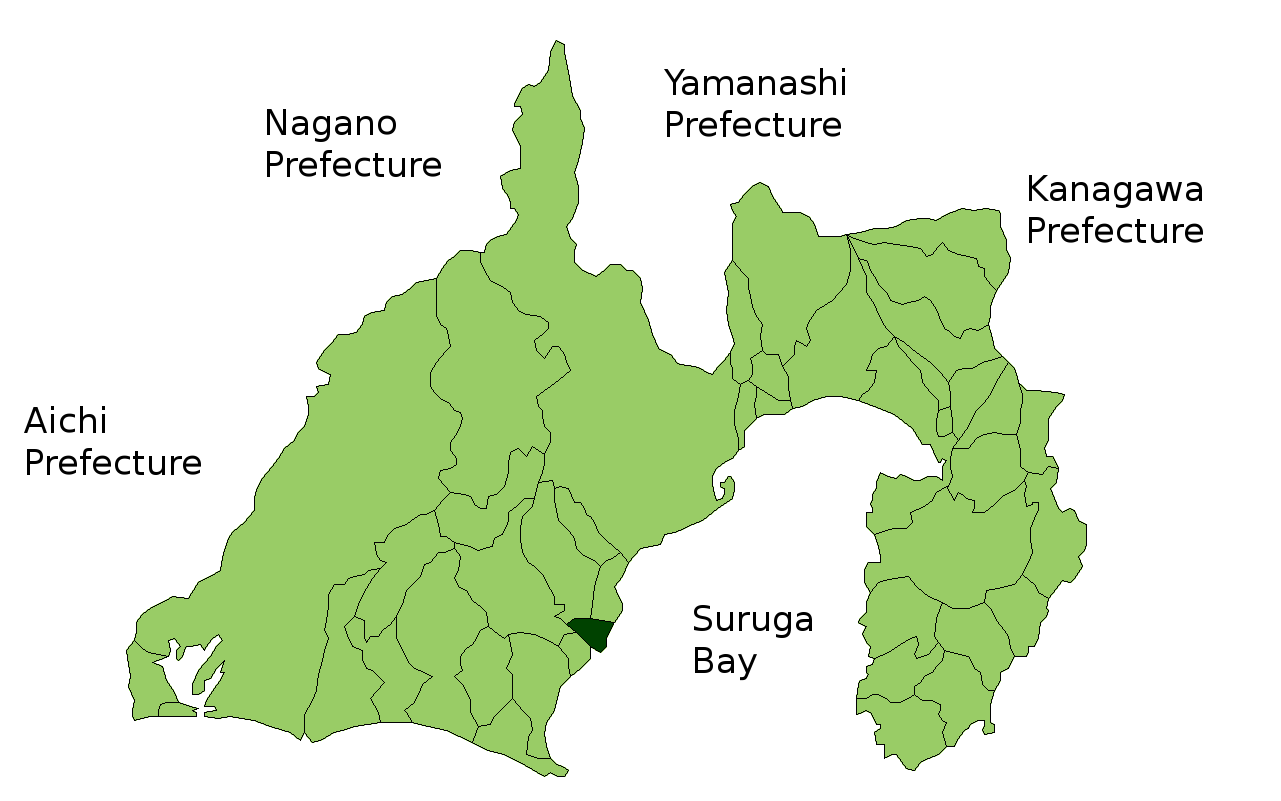
- Location of Ōigawa in Shizuoka Prefecture

- Location in Japan
- Coordinates: 34°48′N 138°17′E
- Country: Japan
- Region: Chūbu (Tōkai)
- Prefecture: Shizuoka Prefecture
- District: Shida
- Merged: November 1, 2008 (now part of Yaizu)

Area
  - Total: 24.54 km^{2} (9.47 sq mi)

Population (October 2008)
  - Total: 22,695
  - Density: 962.92/km^{2} (2,494.0/sq mi)
- Time zone: UTC+09:00 (JST)
- Website: City of Yaizu
- Symbols
- Bird: falcated teal
- Flower: Narcissus
- Tree: Maki

Ōigawa (大井川町, Ōigawa-chō) was a town located in Shida District, Shizuoka Prefecture, Japan.

On November 1, 2008, Ōigawa was merged into the expanded city of Yaizu and thus no longer exists as an independent municipality.

== Population ==
As of 2008, the town had an estimated population of 22,695 and a density of 962.92 persons per km^{2}. The total area was 24.54 km^{2}.

== Geography ==
=== Surrounding municipalities ===
- Fujieda
- Yaizu
- Shimada
- Yoshida, Haibara District

== History ==
- April 1, 1889 – Aikawa Village, Yoshinaga Village and Shizuhama Village founded.
- March 31, 1955 – Ōigawa Town was created from the merger of Aikawa, Yoshinaga and Shizuhama.
- November 1, 2008 – Ōigawa Town was merged into the expanded city of Yaizu.
