= Akira Matsunaga (footballer, born 1914) =

Japanese footballer

Akira Matsunaga 松永 行
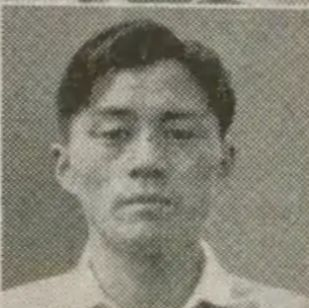
- Akira Matsunaga, July 1936

Personal information
- Full name: Akira Matsunaga
- Date of birth: 21 September 1914
- Place of birth: Yaizu, Shizuoka, Empire of Japan
- Date of death: 20 January 1943 (aged 28)
- Place of death: Guadalcanal, British Solomon Islands
- Height: 1.71 m (5 ft 7 1/2 in)
- Position: Forward

Youth career
- Shida High School

College career
Years	Team	Apps	(Gls)
1935–1937	Tokyo Liberal Arts and Science University		

International career
1936	Japan	2	(1)

Akira Matsunaga (松永 行, Matsunaga Akira; 21 September 1914 – 20 January 1943) was a Japanese footballer. He played for the Japan national team. His brother Nobuo Matsunaga and Seki Matsunaga also played for the Japan national team.

== National team career ==

Miracle of Berlin (1936 Olympics 1st round v Sweden on 4 August)

In 1936, when he was a Tokyo Liberal Arts and Science University student, he was selected Japan national team for 1936 Summer Olympics in Berlin. At this competition, on 4 August, he debuted and scored a goal against Sweden. Japan completed a come-from-behind victory against Sweden. The first victory in Olympics for the Japan and the historic victory over one of the powerhouses became later known as "Miracle of Berlin" (ベルリンの奇跡) in Japan. In 2016, this team was selected Japan Football Hall of Fame. On 7 August, he also played against Italy. He played 2 games and scored 1 goal for Japan in 1936.

== Death ==
In 1937, Matsunaga entered the Imperial Japanese Army and served in World War II with the 230th Infantry Regiment as a lieutenant. On 20 January 1943, he was killed in action during the Guadalcanal Campaign at the age of 28.

== National team statistics ==
Japan national team
Year	Apps	Goals
1936	2	1
Total	2	1
