= Kunio Ogawa =

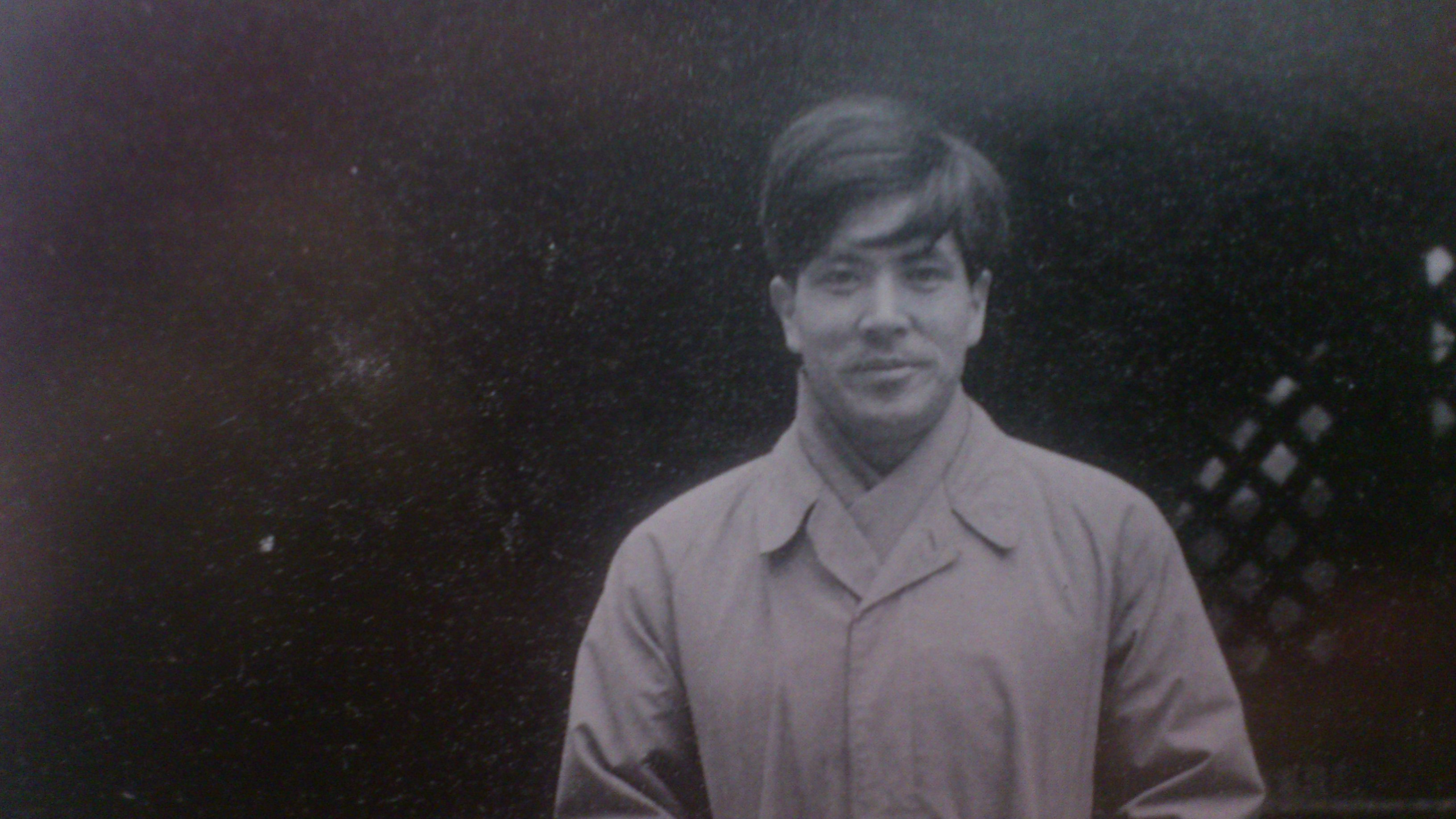
- Ogawa in 1956
- Born: December 21, 1927; Fujieda, Shizuoka, Japan
- Died: April 8, 2008 (aged 80); Shizuoka (city), Japan
- Writing career
- Language: Japanese

Kunio Ogawa (小川 国夫, Ogawa Kunio; December 21, 1927 – April 8, 2008) was a Japanese novelist born in Fujieda, Shizuoka.

Ogawa graduated from the Japanese literature department at Tokyo University. In 1957, he wrote a book titled Aporon no shima (Isles of Apollo) after travelling to the Mediterranean. The book received praise from the novelist Toshio Shimao, which helped launch Ogawa's writing career. His literary style is characterized by insightful exploration of nature and mankind, noted for being clear yet dense.

He died on April 8, 2008, aged 80, in Shizuoka Prefecture.
