= Shizuoka University of Welfare =

Coordinates: 34°49′48″N 138°17′49″E

- 静岡福祉大学
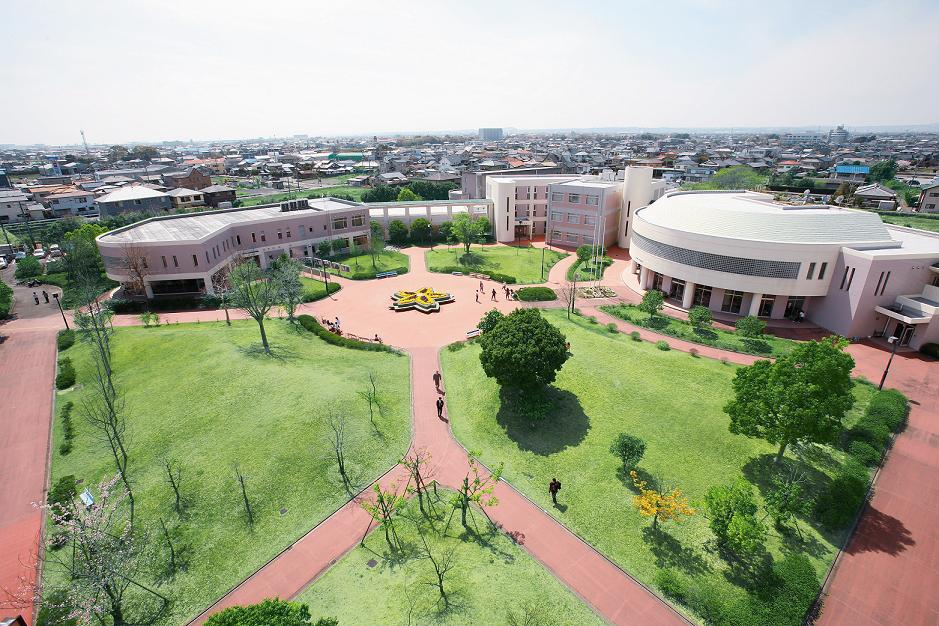
- Shizuoka University of Welfare campus
- Type: Private
- Established: 2004
- Location: Yaizu, Shizuoka, Japan

Shizuoka University of Welfare (静岡福祉大学, Shizuoka Fukushi Daigaku) is a private university in Yaizu city, Shizuoka Prefecture, Japan, established in 2004.

== Departments ==
The university specializes in social welfare programmes, and currently has five departments:

- Department of Psychology in Social Welfare
- Department of Medicine in Social Welfare
- Department of Health in Social Welfare
- Department of Informatics in Social Welfare
- Department of Care and Welfare
