= Tetsuya Ishida =

Japanese painter (born 1973)

- Born: June 16, 1973; Yaizu, Shizuoka, Japan
- Died: May 23, 2005 (aged 31); Machida, Tokyo, Japan
- Education: Musashino Art University
- Known for: Painting and graphic design
- Style: Contemporary Surrealist

Tetsuya Ishida (石田 徹也, Ishida Tetsuya, June 16, 1973 – May 23, 2005) was a contemporary Japanese painter known for his surrealist portrayal of late-20th and early-21st century Japanese city life. His works typically depict hyperrealistic boys and men whose bodies are integrated into everyday appliances, industrial machinery, civic architecture, and animal forms. Ishida's paintings address the themes of isolation, consumerism, academic & professional workplace anxieties, and urban banality.

Ishida quickly ascended the ranks of Japan's contemporary art scene after several of his paintings were exhibited at multiple galleries in the cultural hub of Ginza, and his works were featured in Christie's first ever auction on East Asian avant-garde art (alongside the works of a young Takashi Murakami) in 1998.

As a member of Japan's "Lost Generation" (1991–2001), Ishida was a firsthand witness to the country's economic decline that began in the 1990s and extended into the 2000s. Subsequently, the angst that characterized his age group affected his perceptions of Japan's near-future where he viewed it as a bleak, urbanized atmosphere dominated by technocratic occupations that drain the life from its recent university graduate and middle-aged salarymen employees. With mental illness as a crucial attribute of his work, Ishida's conflicted views of Japan's outlook took a toll on his personal life and has been considered a contributing factor in his death after he was struck by a train in 2005.

== Early life and education (1973–1996) ==
Tetsuya Ishida was born in Yaizu, Shizuoka Prefecture, the youngest of four sons. His mother, Sachiko, was a housewife and his father, Yoshihiro, was a member of Yaizu City Council.

Ishida's earliest exposure to art occurred in 1981 when the illustrations of Lithuanian-American Social Realist Ben Shahn were exhibited in Yaizu. Several of Shahn's pieces portrayed the historic 1954 Lucky Dragon Incident in which Japanese fishermen aboard a tuna boat were exposed to fallout radiation from a nearby nuclear bomb test conducted by the American military. Shahn's staunchly objective, black-and-white depiction of the nuclear blast's massive mushroom cloud unleashed Ishida's desire "to become a painter like Ben Shahn".

During his formative years, Ishida participated in two creative contests that directed his lifelong artistic focus on social commentary. Shortly after the Ben Shahn exhibition, Ishida submitted an essay titled Masshirofunekun (Mr. White Boat) to a local writing contest in response to the imagery from Shahn's Lucky Dragon illustrations (1958). One excerpt from the article clearly demonstrates Ishida's opposition to the use of nuclear military technology:

"From there, the entire body became sick and suffered. The nuclear testing caused hair to fall out and blood loss. They were in pain and could not get up to go to work. It's really a tragedy. Why would humans use H-bombs to kill each other?"

In 1984, the Shizuoka District Legal Affairs Bureau launched a human rights-themed manga competition to which Ishida submitted an entry entitled Yowaimonoijime wa yameyou! (Stop Bullying Weaklings!). This manga piece underscores Ishida's sharp opposition to humanity's over-dependence on technology and foreshadows one of the most prevalent thematic elements throughout his career.

In 1993, Ishida attended Parallel Visions: Modern Artists and Outsider Art at the Setagaya Art Museum, the first exhibition in Japan focused solely on outsider art (individuals with no formal artistic training and without any professional art world affiliations). Most of the artists on display endured varying degrees of mental illness. While there is no clear evidence of any clinical diagnosis, many art historians speculate Ishida's fascination with these artists and his later pictorial representations of mental anguish was because he, too, was afflicted with similar conditions.

Upon graduation from Yaizu Central High School in 1992, Ishida enrolled at Musashino Art University where he earned a degree in Visual Communication Design in 1996. Ishida's parents strongly disapproved of his decision to become an artist and refused to offer any financial support, desiring instead that he pursue a career in academia or chemistry.

== Career (1996–2005) ==
Ishida and his friend, film director Isamu Hirabayashi, formed a multimedia company in 1996 to collaborate on film and art fusion projects. Their partnership ended due to the Japanese recession in the mid-to-late 1990s that forced the duo to transition into graphic design. Ishida disliked marketing and subsequently decided to launch a solo artistic career.

Between 1996 and 2005, Ishida's distinctly surrealistic style attracted a sizable following. His participation in various solo and group exhibitions across the country garnered numerous awards, and Ishida became a dominant fixture in Japan's contemporary art scene.

Tokyo's upscale Ginza shopping district is renowned for its promotion of arts consumption for the general public through exhibitions organized inside department stores. Participation in these exclusive shows was considered a significant accomplishment for emerging Japanese artists. Ginza's reputation for elaborate art shows attracted international figures in modern and contemporary art such as Anselm Kiefer whose major 1993 retrospective Melancholia was held at the Seibu Museum (now Sezon Museum of Modern Art) inside the Seibu Department Store. Ishida was featured in over a dozen Ginza exhibitions that expanded his audience by rendering his works more readily accessible to the general public and art critics.

In October 1998, prominent Dutch art historian Maria Kaldenhoven launched the Western art world's first auction of Asian avant-garde art at Christie's London. Her intent was to highlight the latest developments in "groundbreaking" contemporary East Asian art. Although a Chinese art specialist, Kaldenhoven was captivated by the works of Ishida and Takashi Murakami. She regarded their paintings as reflective of Japan's rising influence in the global contemporary art market. Two Ishida canvases were auctioned alongside two Murakami helium paintings. While neither of his paintings sold, Ishida's inclusion in the auction directly contributed to a surge in popularity of his work among Western and Eastern audiences. In 2007, both aforementioned Ishida paintings were posthumously sold at Christie's London for $530,000 and $270,000, respectively.

As his artistic output increased, Ishida's parents eventually realized the magnitude of their son's skill and commitment to painting, and they came to embrace and appreciate his art.

== Artistic style, content, and themes ==
From the mid-1990s until his death in 2005, Ishida produced a total of 186 paintings, many of which were not discovered until several years later.

Ishida's works convey a sense of foreboding and gloominess through their muted color palettes dominated by blacks, grays, and pale shades of blue. Boys and men often feature as the primary subjects with each assigned a specific role: high school & university-level students and white-collar salarymen. Their faces are almost always identical to one another, and each communicates feelings of pain, hopelessness, and/or exhaustion. The oversized, highly naturalistic bodies are enmeshed within rundown machinery, municipal structures, and consumer products (Cargo, 1997; Gripe, 1997; Prisoner, 1999). Ishida's works are frequently described as "Kafkaesque" because he frequently combined the bodies of humans, animals, and insects (Long Distance, 1999). Art historians and curators observed similarities between the subjects' faces and Ishida's despite his repeated denial that they were self-portraits. Rather, Ishida implied his paintings were a reflection of Japanese society.

Ishida's corpus of work encompasses three major overarching themes: Japan's identity and role in today's world; Japanese social, educational, and professional structures; and the struggle of the Japanese to adapt to the rapid advancement of technology. Entrenched within these themes, motifs of isolation, anxiety, crisis of identity, skepticism, and claustrophobia heavily permeate all of Ishida's work. The violent disfigurement and mutilation of Ishida's subjects allegorize the pressures placed upon students and the labor force by Japanese society: the persistent obligation to obtain high-salary careers and forced conformity to arduous working conditions in an increasingly mechanized environment (Recalled, 1998).

During an archived Tokyo TV television interview from the Kirin Art Gallery feature "The Grand Art Masters", Ishida stated that regardless of whether he enjoyed the artistic process, he felt a compulsive duty to paint "people at mercy of Japan's contradicting nature of its social systems for as long as they exist".

While there is a collective understanding of the main themes behind Ishida's work, several ambiguities related to his subjects remain. One of the most discussed topics references Ishida's repeated insertion of plastic shopping bags in many of his works. He consistently refused to explain their symbolic significance, and no recent scholarship has revealed its function.

== Influences ==
Ishida's keen observations of Japan's turbulent "Lost Decade" (1991–2001) strongly informed the content and themes of his paintings. The country's economic boom of the 1980s ended with a recession in 1991 that carried over into the 21st Century. Consequently, young adults who graduated from universities within this ten-year span faced much greater difficulties securing employment; thousands of recent graduates were unemployed or underemployed. The heightened pressure and anxiety they experienced led them to become labeled by society as the "Lost Generation". Concurrently, Japan underwent multiple social and political crises that further intensified its existing problems: the 1995 sarin gas attacks in the Tokyo Metro system by the doomsday cult Aum Shinrikyo; the decimation of urban infrastructure following the 1995 Kobe Earthquake; and, the 1997 Kobe Child Murders committed by a fourteen-year-old boy.

As part of the "Lost Generation", Ishida's personal life is intrinsically connected to the narratives of his paintings. His parents and school officials continually pressured him to obtain high marks on scholastic examinations and to acquire gainful employment outside the visual arts sector. Ishida's lack of interest in alternative professions coupled with societal constraints caused Ishida to struggle deeply with his individualism.

Beyond personal experiences, Ishida received great artistic inspiration from an eclectic range of subjects:

- Japanese comics and manga, particularly the works of painter-illustrator Rokuro Taniuchi and cartoonist Yoshiharu Tsuge
- European and American artists Ben Shahn, Fabrizio Clerici, Vincent van Gogh, Anselm Kiefer, and Friedensreich Hundertwasser
- The mise-en-scene cinematography of Russian filmmaker Andrei Tarkovsky and Iranian filmmaker Abbas Kiarostami
- The depiction of suicide in German director Jorg Buttgereit's controversial 1990 film Der Todesking (The Death King)
- The literature of Fyodor Dostoyevsky, Kobo Abe, and Osamu Dazai

== Personal life ==
Ishida shared anecdotes of his parents' bewilderment at both the artistic style and the grim nature of his works. His mother was particularly upset by one of his paintings that she viewed as extremely morbid. Ishida assured her it represented his happiness captured in a moment of uninhibited freedom of expression.

Ishida was romantically involved with Hiromi Toyoda, but later ended the relationship after he told her "I'm so happy being with you that I cannot paint anymore".

In the final chapter of the exhibition catalogue for the Museo Nacional Centro de Arte Reina Sofia's 2019 retrospective Ishida: Self-Portrait of Other, friend and former artistic collaborator Isamu Hirabayashi contributed an essay that described their early time together as well as Ishida's final years and death. Following the end of their creative partnership, Hirabayashi stated they maintained limited contact, but noted that Ishida's last residence was in Sagami Ono, a suburb of Sagamihara, that enabled him easy access to the expansive Seikado art supply store.

Ishida worked in a print shop and as a night watchman to provide for his excessive spending on artistic materials. Hirabayashi confirmed that Ishida's mental health appeared to rapidly decline due to a contentious relationship with the print shop manager that "made his life miserable", and the wrongful accusation and termination of his watchman position following the accidental death of a co-worker crushed by a truck.

== Death and legacy ==
On May 23, 2005, Ishida died after he was struck by a passing train at a level crossing in Machida, Tokyo. Art critics, historians, and curators inferred the tragedy was an act of suicide, citing that the young man and the recurring themes of mental illness, overwork, and death in his art were self-portrait depictions of Ishida himself.

In 2007, Ishida's family donated 21 of his paintings to the Shizuoka Prefectural Museum of Art (his hometown Yaizu is located in Shizuoka Prefecture) for permanent display.

== Posthumously auctioned paintings ==
In 2006 at Christie's Hong Kong "Asian Contemporary Art" auction, the pre-auction sale estimate of the late Ishida's painting Untitled 2001 (oil on canvas, 130.5 x 190.3 cm; 51 1/4 x 75 inches) was HK$60,000–HK$80,000 (US$7,745–US$10,326). However, on November 26 Untitled 2001 sold for HK$780,000 (US$100,681), ten times its original estimate.

In 2008, Untitled 2001 was again put up in Christie's "Asian Contemporary Art" auction. In less than two years, Ishida's painting dramatically appreciated three times its previous value, and generated an impressive HK$2,900,000 (US$375,885) - the high end of its 2008 estimate of HK$2,000,000–HK$3,000,000 (US$259,231–US$388,847).

== Exhibitions ==
Select solo exhibitions

1996: Tadayou Hito - Guardian Garden Gallery, Ginza, Tokyo, Japan

1999: Ishida Tetsuya - Gallery Q&QS, Ginza, Tokyo, Japan

2003: Tetsuya Ishida - Gallery Iseyoshi, Ginza, Tokyo, Japan

Select group exhibitions

1995: 6th Hitotsubu Exhibition - Tokyo, Japan

1997: JACA Japan Visual Arts Exhibition

1998: Christie's "Asia Avant Garde" Exhibition - London, United Kingdom

1998: 7th Liquitex Exhibition

1999: Nippon International Contemporary Art Festival - Tokyo, Japan

2001: VOCA Exhibition - Tokyo, Japan

2011: OUR MAGIC HOUR: How Much of the World Can We Know? - Yokohama Triennale, Yokohama, Japan

2015: Japan Pavilion - Venice Biennale, Venice, Italy

2020: Taipei Dangdai - Taipei, Taiwan

2021: Hong Kong Exchange - Gagosian, Hong Kong, China

Retrospective

2006: Fear - The Hidden Sign - Gallery Iseyoshi, Ginza, Tokyo, Japan

2006: Drifter - Guardian Garden Gallery, Ginza, Tokyo, Japan

2006: Solo Retrospective - Gallery Q, Ginza, Tokyo, Japan

2007: A Little Exhibition - CB Collection Roppongi, Tokyo, Japan

2007: The Person Who Was Not Able to Fly - Sunpu Museum, Shizuoka, Japan

2008: Tetsuya Ishida - Our Self Portraits - Nerima Art Museum, Tokyo, Japan

2013: Tetsuya Ishida - Gagosian, Hong Kong, China

2013: Note of Tetsuya Ishida - Ashikaga Museum of Art, Tochigi, Japan

2014: Notes, Evidence of Dreams - Tonami Art Museum, Tonami, Japan

2014: Tetsuya Ishida: Saving the World with a Brushstroke - Asian Art Museum, San Francisco, California

2019: Tetsuya Ishida - Self-Portrait of Other - Museo Nacional Centro de Arte Reina Sofia, Madrid, Spain

2019: Tetsuya Ishida - Self-Portrait of Other - Wrightwood 659, Chicago, Illinois

2020: Tetsuya Ishida - Gagosian, New York, New York

2023: Tetsuya Ishida: My Anxious Self — Gagosian, New York, New York

== Awards and recognitions ==
- 1995: Grand Prize in Graphic Arts at 6th Hitotsubu Exhibition
- 1995: Mainichi Design Award
- 1996: Encouragement Prize at Mainichi Design Award
- 1997: Grand Prize JACA Japan Visual Arts Exhibition
- 1998: Encouragement Prize at Kirin Contemporary Awards
- 2001: Encouragement Prize at VOCA Exhibition
- 2009: Purple Japanese Medal of Honor (Awarded posthumously to Ishida's parents)

== Notable works ==
Year	Title	Medium
1996	Soldier	Acrylic on board
1996	Toyota Ipsum	Acrylic on paper
1997	Cargo	Acrylic on board
1998	Recalled	Acrylic on board
1999	Waiting for a Chance	Acrylic on board
1999	Long Distance	Acrylic on board
1999	Prisoner	Acrylic on board
2001	Sosaku (Search)	Oil on canvas
2003	Return journey	Acrylic and oil on canvas
2004	Interruption	Acrylic and oil on canvas

== Quotations of non-English resources ==
1. "Tatsuya Ishida's Complete Works" to be published 5 years after his death in a train accident at a level crossing."

「2005年5月23日に踏切事故のため31歳で亡くなった画家石田徹也の没後5年に合わせ、「石田徹也全作品集」が出版される。」.
