= Okabe, Shizuoka =

Okabe 岡部町
- Former municipality
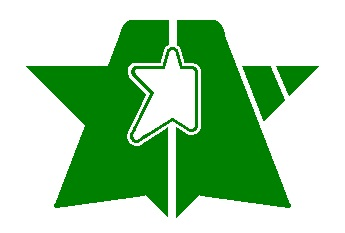
- Flag Seal

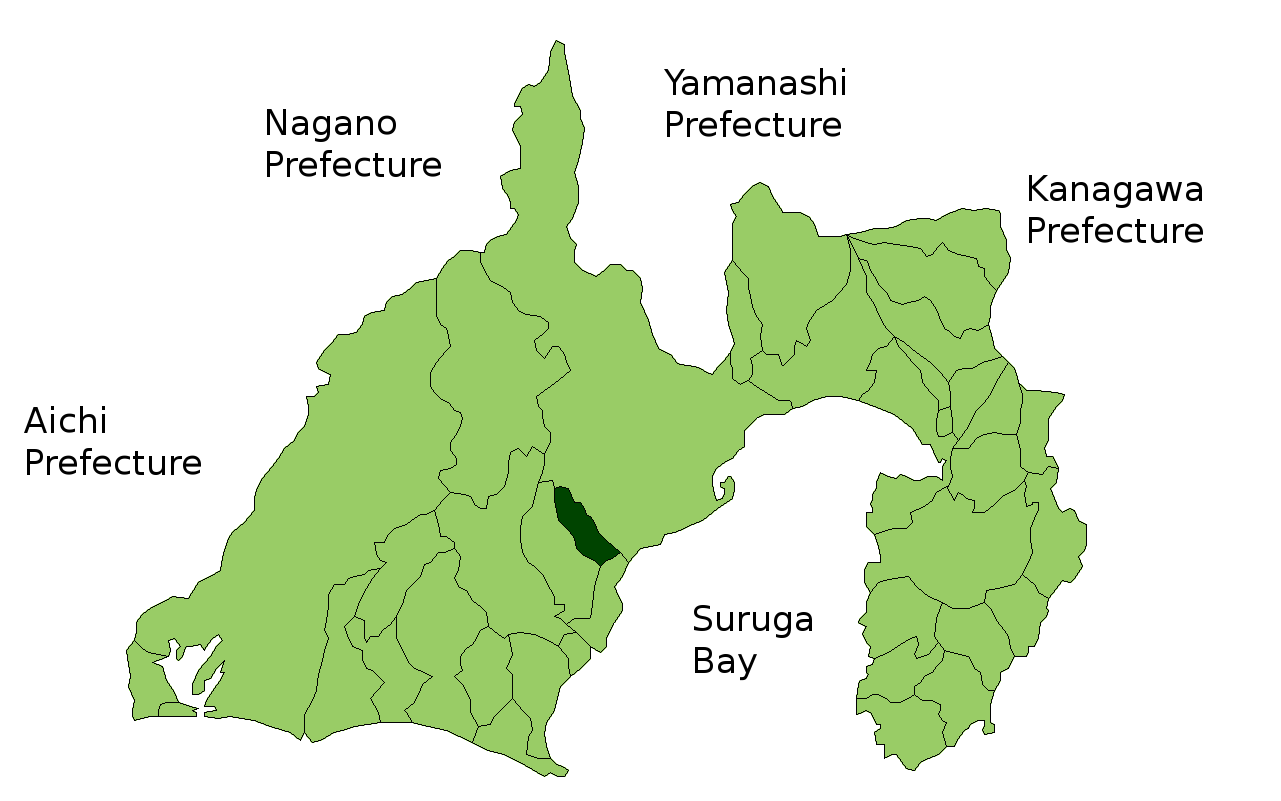
- Location of Okabe in Shizuoka Prefecture

- Location in Japan
- Coordinates: 34°55′N 138°17′E
- Country: Japan
- Region: Chūbu (Tōkai)
- Prefecture: Shizuoka Prefecture
- District: Shida
- Merged: January 1, 2009 (now part of Fujieda, Shizuoka)

Area
  - Total: 53.29 km^{2} (20.58 sq mi)

Population (December 31, 2008)
  - Total: 12,210
- Time zone: UTC+09:00 (JST)
- Website: City of Fujieda
- Symbols
- Flower: Prunus Mume
- Tree: Osmanthus

Okabe (岡部町, Okabe-chō) was a town located in Shida District, Shizuoka, Japan.

== Population ==
As of 2003, the town had an estimated population of 12,839 and a density of 240.93 persons per km^{2}. The total area was 53.29 km^{2}.

== History ==
Okabe developed in the Edo period as Okabe-juku, a post-town on the Tōkaidō.

== Merge ==
On January 1, 2009, Okabe was merged into the expanded city of Fujieda and thus no longer exists as an independent municipality. Shida District was dissolved as a result of the merger.

== Transportation ==
The town was served by an interchange on Japan National Route 1, but had no train service.
