= Seki Matsunaga =

Japanese footballer

Seki Matsunaga 松永 碩
Personal information
- Full name: Seki Matsunaga
- Date of birth: June 25, 1928
- Place of birth: Shizuoka, Empire of Japan
- Date of death: March 4, 2013 (aged 84)
- Place of death: Setagaya, Tokyo, Japan
- Position: Forward

Youth career
- Shida High School
- Waseda University

Senior career*
Years	Team	Apps	(Gls)
- Hitachi

International career
1951	Japan	1	(0)
Medal record
Representing Japan
Asian Games
Bronze medal – third place	1951 New Delhi	Team
- * Club domestic league appearances and goals

Seki Matsunaga (松永 碩, Matsunaga Seki; June 25, 1928 – March 4, 2013) was a Japanese football player. He played for Japan national team. His brother Akira Matsunaga and Nobuo Matsunaga also played for Japan national team.

== Club career ==
Matsunaga was born in Shizuoka Prefecture on June 25, 1928. After graduating from Waseda University, he played for Hitachi.

== National team career ==
In March 1951, when Matsunaga was a Waseda University student, he was selected Japan national team for Japan team first game after World War II, 1951 Asian Games. At this competition, on March 9, he debuted against Afghanistan.

On March 4, 2013, Matsunaga died of respiratory failure in Setagaya, Tokyo at the age of 84.

== National team statistics ==
Japan national team
Year	Apps	Goals
1951	1	0
Total	1	0

== Honours ==
Japan

- Asian Games Bronze medal: 1951
