= Kitayama Junyu =

Japanese philosopher

- Born: January 29, 1902; Yaizu, Shizuoka, Japan
- Died: January 19, 1962 (aged 59); Prague, Czechoslovakia

Education
- Education: Taishō daigaku

Philosophical work
- Era: 20th-century philosophy
- Region: Japanese philosophy
- Institutions: Albert Ludwig University of Freiburg, Ruprecht Karl University of Heidelberg, University of Frankfurt am Main, Philipps University of Marburg, Japan Institute Berlin, Japanese Embassy Berlin, Charles University in Prague
- Main interests: Buddhism, Comparative philosophy, Metaphysics

Junyu Kitayama (北山 淳友, Kitayama Junyu) (January 29, 1902 – January 19, 1962) was a Japanese Buddhist philosopher, metaphysical humanist, writer, religious scholar, translator, and university teacher. He was director of the Japan Institute Berlin and also a judo teacher.

== Life and work ==
Kitayama was born as the eldest son into a family of a Buddhist monk of the Pure Land school (Jōdo-shū 浄土宗) of Kyonenji (教念寺) shrine in Yaizu. Kitayama first attended Shizuoka Middle School and from 1920 studied Buddhism, Chinese philology, and Japanese literature at Shūkyō daigaku (later Taisho daigaku) in Tokyo.

He graduated from the university in 1924. In the same year, he started his studies in Germany, where he was sent by the Pure Land School. He studied philosophy, Indology, and sociology at the Albert Ludwigs University in Freiburg under the phenomenologist Edmund Husserl and the Indologist Ernst Leumann.

From 1927, he continued his studies at the Ruprecht Karl University of Heidelberg, where he studied Indology, Buddhist Studies, Tibetan Studies, and Sociology. Under the guidance of the existentialist Karl Jaspers, he wrote his doctoral thesis. In 1930 he began working as an assistant at the Institute of Religious Studies at the University of Marburg. At the same time, under the guidance of Jaspers, he completed his studies by submitting his dissertation on "The Metaphysics of Buddhism." He received his doctorate in Heidelberg in 1929 and then taught Japanese language and Japanese studies in Frankfurt am Main until 1936. Between 1929 and 1933 he also worked as an assistant in the religious studies collection at the University of Frankfurt am Main.

From 1936 he was deputy head of the Japan Institute in Berlin. In 1939 he was appointed professor of philosophy and German language in Tokyo. In 1940 he was appointed honorary professor for East Asian culture and religion at the University of Marburg. Between 1942 and 1944 he held a teaching position in Japanese Studies at the University of Marburg. In addition to Japanese, he also taught philosophy, Buddhism, Eastern thought, comparative philosophy, cultural history, etc.

Between 1944 and 1945 he was professor and director of the East Asia Institute at Charles University in Prague.

He was interned with German prisoners in Czechoslovakia in 1945. After a few months, he was released and worked as a Japanese teacher and translator in Prague. He healed people with traditional Japanese medicine and taught judo. He died in Prague in 1962 after heart problems. He never returned to Japan even though he had the opportunity to do so. His brother picked up his remains in 1962 and had them buried near the Kyonenji shrine in Yaizu, Japan.

In addition to teaching Japanese, he worked as a translator and interpreter, taught martial arts (judo), and in his spare time devoted himself to philosophical and religious research. He left behind an extensive scholarly work comprising numerous volumes and manuscripts in German, Japanese, and English.

== Legacy ==
Kitayama's dissertation on Vasubandhu's metaphysics and his interpretation of Buddhist and Japanese thought influenced German philosophers such as his teacher Jaspers as well as Martin Heidegger.

The Sanskrit manuscript of the Twenty Treatises discovered in Nepal by Sylvain Levi was published in 1925 and translated into French by Levy himself in 1932, but Kitayama's doctoral thesis was published in 1930, so he had translated it into German before Levy's French translation appeared.

Between 1937 and 1947 he was very active in literature, writing books and articles (mostly in German and some articles in Czech) introducing Japanese culture and philosophy to Europeans. In Germany, he was active in lecturing about Japanese culture to the public during the National Socialist era. Towards the end of his life in Czechoslovakia, he co-authored a book on self-defense using the judo techniques of Goshin Jutsu only.

Kitayama promoted Buddhist and Japanese thought and culture to German intellectuals and the public through his publication and lecturing activities. Kitayama arguably influenced Jaspers and his project of a history of world philosophy. Jaspers would later publish in 1957 his major work, The Great Philosophers (Die Grossen Philosophen).

In 1942, the National Socialist Security Service of the Reichsfuhrer SS noted in a secret situation report that Kitayama's writings strengthened the feeling of internal weakness in Europe. The "National Socialist forces of a new order on a Germanic-German basis were not mentioned at all". The depiction of Asia by Kitayama could provoke politically undesirable reactions, especially among readers who were critical of the Nazis, in the form of an overly positive assessment of Asian cultures from the point of view of the report's authors. However, Kitayama is frequently seen as a representative of Japanese Pan-Asianism and imperial politics in writings such as his 1943 Sanctification of the State and Human Transfiguration: Buddhism and Japan.

Today he can be considered not only as a key popularizer of German-Japanese and Czechoslovak-Japanese cultural relations, who contributed to the development of Japanese martial arts in Czechoslovakia but also one of the founders of the "Prague School of Japanology".

In Japan, he is recognized as a Buddhist philosopher today. He attempted to interpret Buddhist philosophy, especially Sechin's existential philosophy and contributed to the introduction of Japanese thought and culture, including Nishida's philosophy. His major publications include Metaphysik des Buddhismus (1934) and West-Östliche Begegnung, Japans Kultur und Tradition (1940).

== Literary works ==
- Junyu Kitayama, Metaphysik des Buddhismus: Versuch einer philosophischen Interpretation der Lehre Vasubandhus und seiner Schule, Veröffentlichungen des Orientalischen Seminars der Universität Tübingen, #7 Heft, W. Kohlhammer, Stuttgart 1934., pages 234–268, German, (reprint San Francisco: Chinese Materials center 1976).
- Junyu Kitayama, Die japanische Urkultur und ihre Auseinadnersetzung mit dem Buddhismus, 1937, pages: 8, German.
- Junyu Kitayama: Bild und Schrift in Japan, Klaus (Herausgeber): Die zeitgemäße Schrift. Studienhefte für Schrift und Formgestaltung. Berlin-Leipzig: Verlag für Schriftkunde Heintze & Blanckertz, nb 2, 1937, German.
- Hokusai Katsushika, Junʼyū Kitayama, Fujijama der ewige Berg Japans: 36 Holzschnitte, Insel-Verlag, 1937 (Insel-Bücherei Nr. 520), 2th release 1957, pages: 47, German.
- Junyu Kitayama, Genjo Koan. Aus dem Zen-Text Shobo genzo von Patriarch Dogen, Quellenstudien zur Religionsgeschichtet 1, 1940, German.
- Heinrich Frick, Junʼyū Kitayama, Gerardus Leeuw, Rudolf Franz Merkel, Alfred Töpelmann, Quellenstudien zur Religionsgeschichte, 1940, pages: 68, German.
- Junyu Kitayama, West – östliche Begegnung: Japans Kultur und Tradition, W. de Gruyter, 1942, pages: 252, German.
- Prof. Dr. Junyu Kitayama, Samurai – Japans Heldengeist; Der Adler. Heft 1, 6. January 1942, Berlin: Reichsluftfahrtministerium(Hrsg.), article in a magazine. pages 2., German.
- Junyu Kitayama, Heiligung des Staates und Verklärung des Menschen. Buddhismus und Japan., Berlin: Limpert. 1943, pages: 32, German.
- Junyu Kitayama, Der Shintoismus. Die Nationalreligion Japans., Berlin: Limpert. 1943, pages: 16, German. (Translated: Kitayama Junyu, Shintoism: The National Religion of Japan. Vienna: Hiragana Verlag. 2025.)
- Junyu Kitayama, Der Geist des japanischen Rittertums, Japanische Kulturserie, Berlin : Limpert, 1943, pages: 16, German.
- Junyu Kitayama, Die moderne Philosophie Japans. Ein Beitrag zum Verständnis der ‘Nishida-Philosophie’, Kant-Studien N.F. 43, 1943, pages: 265, German
- Junyu Kitayama, Heroisches Ethos, Walter de Gruygter & Co, Berlin 1944, pages: 161, German.
- Dr. Džúnjú Kitajama: Osobnost a společnost v moderním japonském románů, Nový Orient. Vol. 1, No. 10 (1945–46), s. 5–6., pages: 2, Czech.
- Dr. Džunjú Kitajama: Umění Dálného východu a jeho zvláštnosti, Nový Orient. Vol. 2, No. 8 (1947), s. 6–7., pages: 2, Czech
- Adolf Andrej Lebeda, Junyu Kitayama, Ladislav Pikhart, Branný zápas judo, STN, 1954, pages: 102, Czech.
- Dr. Junyu Kitayama, Vladimír Lorenz Sebeobrana, Kodokan goshin jutsu, Naše vojsko Prague, 1963, pages: 171, Czech.
- Junyu Kitayama, 虜囚歌 : プラハ収容所 Prisoner of War Song: Prague internment camp, Association for the Publication of Kitayama Junyu's Posthumous, 1984/12, pages: 88, Japanese.
- Junyu Kitayama, 東と西永遠の道 : 仏教哲学・比較哲学論集 East and West Eternal Road: Buddhist Philosophy/Comparative Philosophy, Kitaki shuppan, 1985, pages: 478, Japanese.
