= Yaizu =

Yaizu 焼津市
- City
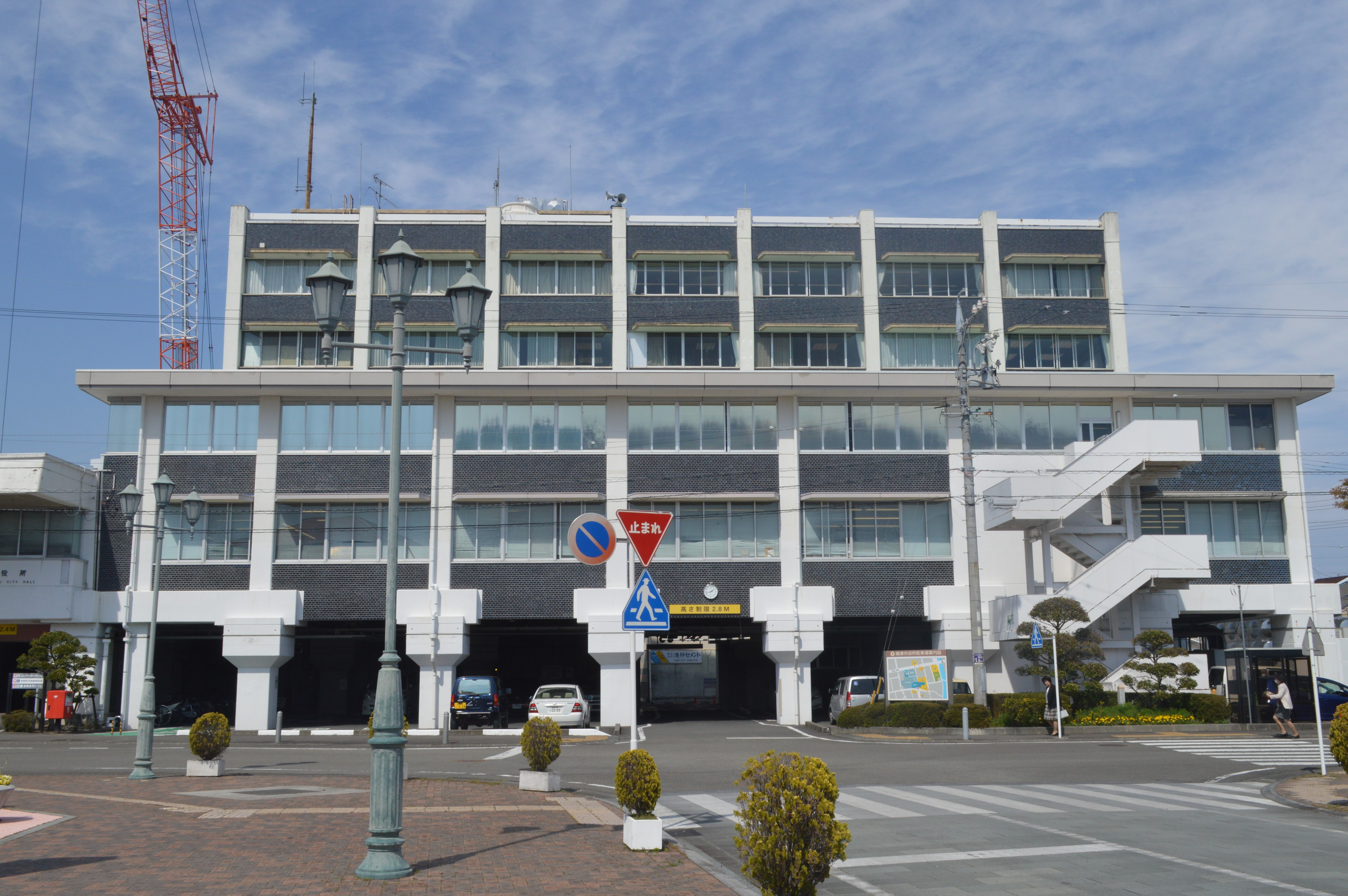
- Yaizu City Hall

- Flag Emblem

- Location of Yaizu in Shizuoka Prefecture

- Coordinates: 34°52′01″N 138°19′29″E
- Country: Japan
- Region: Chūbu (Tōkai)
- Prefecture: Shizuoka
- First official recorded: 4th century AD (official)
- Town settled: June 28, 1901
- City settled: March 1, 1951

Government
  - Mayor: Hiromichi Nakano

Area
  - Total: 70.31 km^{2} (27.15 sq mi)

Population (January 2026)
  - Total: 133,916
  - Density: 1,905/km^{2} (4,933/sq mi)
- Time zone: UTC+9 (Japan Standard Time)
- Tree: Pine
- Flower: Satsuki azalea
- Bird: Black-headed gull
- Phone number: 054-626-1111
- Address: 2-16-32 Hommachi, Yaizu-shi, Shizuoka-ken 425-8502
- Website: Official website

Yaizu (焼津市, Yaizu-shi) is a city located in central Shizuoka Prefecture, Japan. As of 31 January 2026, the city had an estimated population of 133,916 in 61,125 households, and a population density of 1,905 persons per km^{2}. The total area of the city is 70.31 square kilometres (27.15 sq mi). Yaizu is a noted port for commercial fishing.

== Geography ==
Yaizu is located in central Shizuoka Prefecture, on a heavily indented coastline of Suruga Bay, facing the Pacific Ocean. The climate, tempered by the warm Kuroshio Current offshore is maritime temperature, with hot, humid summers and short cool winters.

=== Surrounding municipalities ===
- Shizuoka Prefecture
  - Fujieda
  - Shimada
  - Suruga-ku, Shizuoka
  - Yoshida

== Demographics ==
The population as of January 31, 2026 was 133,916 living in 61,125 households. The number of foreign residents was 6,231 living in 3,680 households.

Per Japanese census data, the population of Yaizu increased over a 70 year period, and began to decline in the 2010s.

Historical population
Year	Pop.	±%
1960	88,703	—
1970	99,549	+12.2%
1980	124,071	+24.6%
1990	134,208	+8.2%
2000	141,452	+5.4%
2010	143,229	+1.3%
2020	139,217	−2.8%

=== Climate ===
The city has a climate characterized by hot and humid summers, and relatively mild winters (Köppen climate classification Cfa). The average annual temperature in Yaizu is 16.3 °C. The average annual rainfall is 2176 mm with September as the wettest month. The temperatures are highest on average in August, at around 27.0 °C, and lowest in January, at around 6.3 °C.

== History ==
Yaizu is an ancient settlement, with Yaizu Shrine claiming to have been founded in the 5th century during the Kofun period, and numerous kofun tumuli are found within the city limits. During the Edo period, Yaizu developed as a port under Tanaka Domain, and fish from Yaizu was frequently supplied to the retired shōgun Tokugawa Ieyasu at nearby Sunpu Castle. In the October 1, 1886, establishment of the modern municipalities system after the Meiji Restoration, Yaizu Village was established within Mashizu District, Shizuoka prefecture. Mashizu District merged into neighboring Shida District in 1896. The following year, in 1897, author Lafcadio Hearn began his residence in Yaizu.

Yaizu was elevated to town status on June 28, 1901. Yaizu Fishing Cooperative was established in 1903, and started to take frozen catch from Yaizu to Tokyo's Tsukiji fish market from 1908. Shipbuilding facilities, primarily for the production of fishing vessels, was established in 1924. The Yaizu Fishing Cooperative began the first wireless communication with its fishing fleet in Japan in 1925, but overfishing soon led to collapse of bonito stocks in 1926, resulting in a five-year fishing moratorium. After the start of World War II, the Yaizu fishing industry was again hit hard by the requisition of entire Yaizu fishing fleet (113 vessels) and crewmen by Imperial Japanese Navy in 1941. Only 10 vessels survived the war.

Yaizu was elevated to city status on March 1, 1951. On November 1, 1953, Toyota Village merged into Yaizu City. The city name gained international prominence over the Daigo Fukuryū Maru Incident, in which a Yaizu-based fishing vessel was irradiated by atomic testing at Bikini Atoll on March 1, 1954. The city further expanded on January 1, 1955, by annexation of the neighboring villages of Higashi Mashizu, Kogawa, Ōtomi, and Wada, and on April 1, 1957, when Hirohata Village was divided between Yaizu and Fujieda cities. Yaizu port underwent a major expansion in March 1968. The city was the site of the 2001 Japan Airlines mid-air incident on January 31, 2001.

On November 1, 2008, the town of Ōigawa (from Shida District) was merged into Yaizu.

== Government ==
Yaizu has a mayor-council form of government with a directly elected mayor and a unicameral city legislature of 21 members. The city contributes three members to the Shizuoka Prefectural Assembly.

== Economy ==
The economy of Yaizu is dominated by the commercial fishing industry. Yaizu Port was first in Japan in terms of tonnage of bonito and tuna in 2002, and third in terms of mackerel. Local industries are centered on food processing, including the production of katsuobushi, shiokara, tsukudani, and kamaboko (especially narutomaki). Agricultural products include green tea, melons, tangerines, and tomatoes. Yaizu is also the home of the Hasegawa plastic model kit manufacturing company. Yaizu is also home to one of Sapporo Brewery's Largest factories, as well as the company's new product development division.

== Transportation ==
=== Railway ===
- Central Japan Railway Company - Tōkaidō Main Line
  - Yaizu - Nishi-Yaizu

=== Highways ===
- Tōmei Expressway
- National Route 150

== Education ==
Yaizu has 13 public elementary schools and ten public middle schools operated by the city government. Three public high schools, including a fisheries vocational school are operated by the Shizuoka Prefectural Board of Education. The city also has one private high school.

Two post-secondary institutions, private Shizuoka University of Welfare and public Shizuoka Prefectural Chubu Nursing College are located in Yaizu.

== Military facilities ==
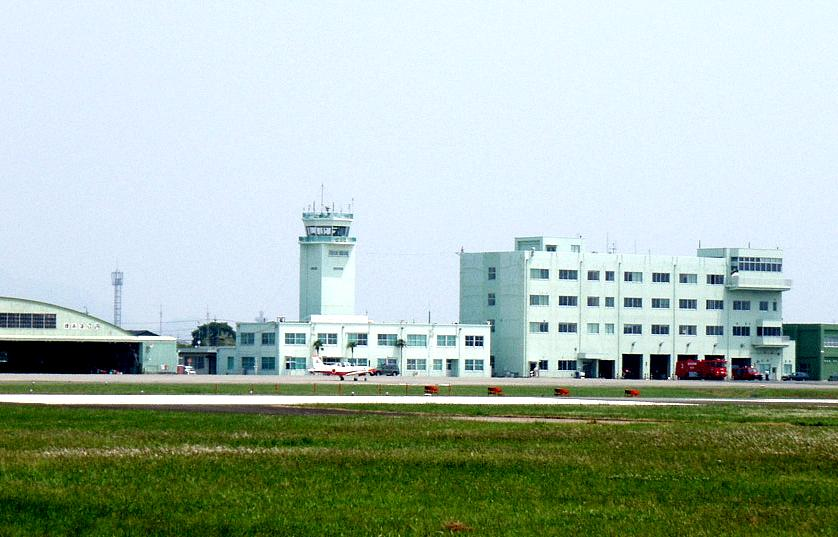
JASDF Shizuhama Air Base in Yaizu

- Shizuhama Air Base

== Sister cities ==
Country	City	State / Region	Since
Australia	Hobart	Tasmania	1977
Japan	Toki	Gifu Prefecture	1978
Mongolia	Chingeltei	Ulaanbaatar	2018

== Notable people from Yaizu ==
- Midorifuji Kazunari, sumo wrestler
- Itsuko Hasegawa, architect
- Tetsuya Ishida, artist
- Kitayama Junyu, Buddhist philosopher, religious scholar
- Yoshikiyo Kuboyama, professional soccer player
- Tomohiro Matsunaga, Olympic silver-medalist wrestler
- Taisuke Muramatsu, professional soccer player
- Yonosuke Nakano, founder of the Ananaikyo religion and OISCA International
- Katayama Shinji, sumo wrestler
- Kitayama Shinobu, social psychologist
- Masaharu Suzuki, professional soccer player
