= Shida District, Shizuoka =

Former district of Japan

Coordinates: 34°55′N 138°17′E

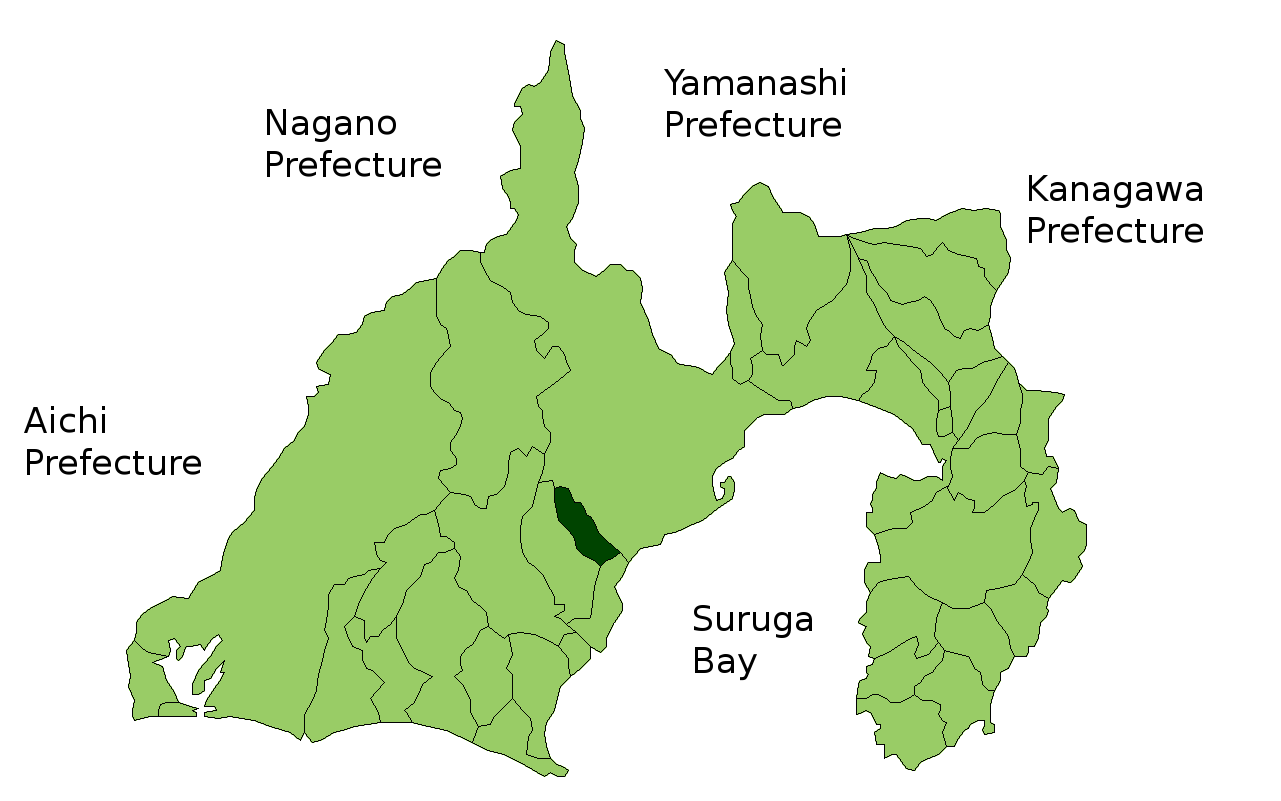
Location of Shida District in Shizuoka prefecture, prior to its final dissolution

Shida District (志太郡, Shida-gun) was a rural district located in central Shizuoka Prefecture, Japan.

== Population ==
As of the end of 2008 (the last data available before its dissolution), the district had an estimated population of 12,110 and a population density of 227.25 inhabitants per square kilometer (588.6/sq mi). Its total area was 53.29 km^{2} (20.58 sq mi).

== History ==
Shida District was created in the early Meiji cadastral reforms of 1879 out of Haibara District. In the organization of municipalities of October 1, 1889, Shida District was divided into three town (Shimada, Fujieda and Okabe) and 22 villages. It gained another three villages on April 1, 1896, with the annexation of Mashizu District (益津郡, Mashizu-gun). Yaizu was raised to town status on June 28, 1901, followed by Aoshima Village on January 1, 1922, leaving the district with five towns and 23 villages.

On January 1, 1948, Shimada was elevated to city status. Yaizu was elevated to city status on March 1, 1951, and Ogawa Village was elevated to town status on October 1, 1952. In a round of consolidation from 1953 to 1956, the number of villages was reduced from 22 to zero, and Fujieda was proclaimed a city on March 31, 1954.

=== Recent mergers ===
- On November 1, 2008 - the town of Ōigawa (created on March 31, 1955) was merged into the expanded city of Yaizu.
- On January 1, 2009 - the town of Okabe was merged into the expanded city of Fujieda. Shida District was dissolved as a result of this merger.
