= Fujieda, Shizuoka =

Fujieda 藤枝市
- City
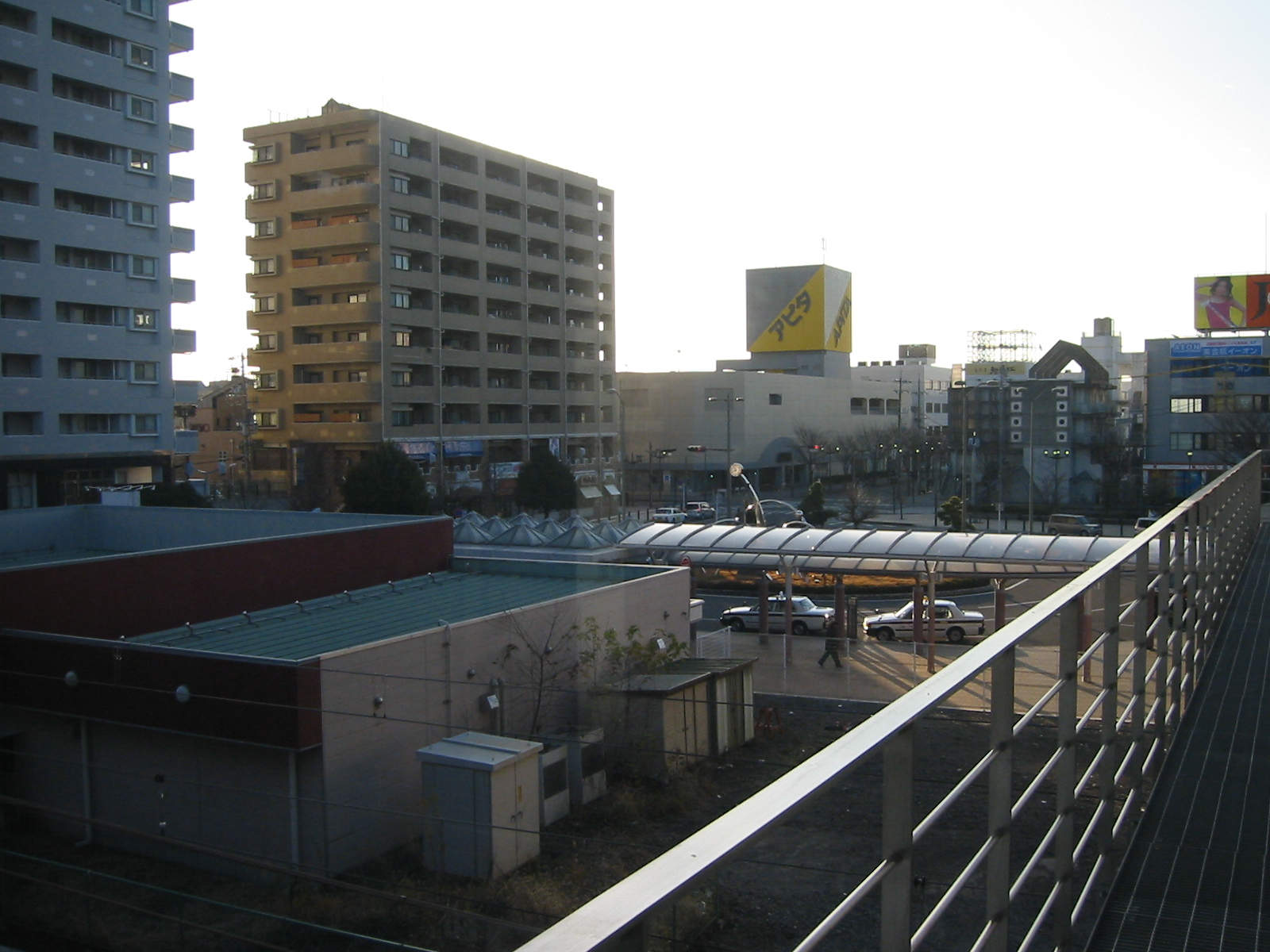
- View from Fujieda Station

- Flag Emblem

- Location of Fujieda in Shizuoka Prefecture

- Coordinates: 34°52′2.7″N 138°15′27.8″E
- Country: Japan
- Region: Chūbu (Tōkai)
- Prefecture: Shizuoka
- First official recorded: 318 AD (official)
- Town settled: April 1, 1889
- City settled: March 31, 1954

Government
  - Mayor: Shōhei Kitamura (from June 2008)

Area
  - Total: 194.06 km^{2} (74.93 sq mi)

Population (April 2019)
  - Total: 145,032
  - Density: 747.36/km^{2} (1,935.6/sq mi)
- Time zone: UTC+9 (Japan Standard Time)
- Tree: Pine
- Flower: Wisteria
- Bird: Japanese bush warbler
- Phone number: 054-643-3111
- Address: 1-11-1 Okadeyama, Fujieda-shi, Shizuoka-ken 426-8722
- Website: Official website

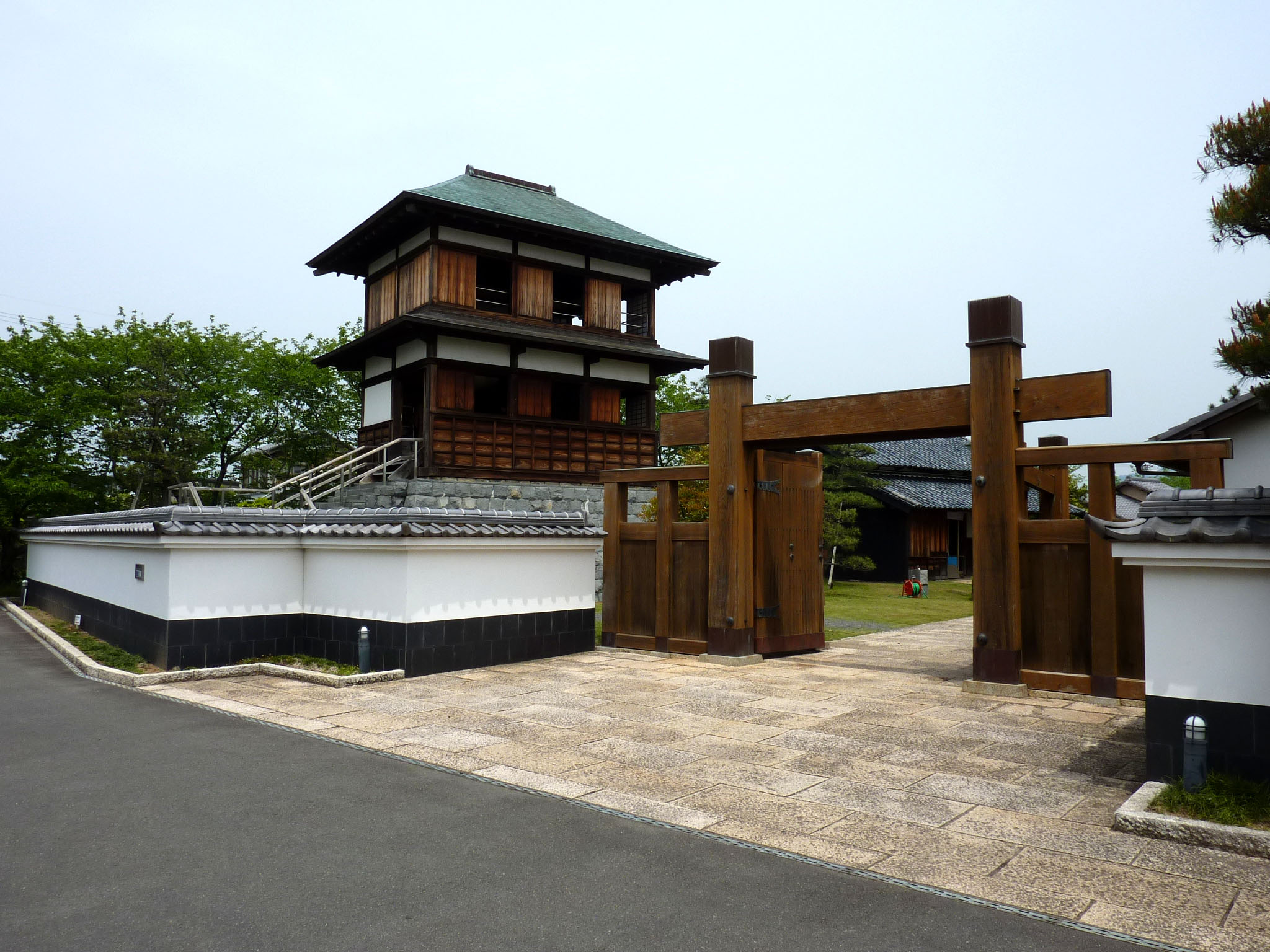
Reconstruction of Tanaka Castle in Fujieda

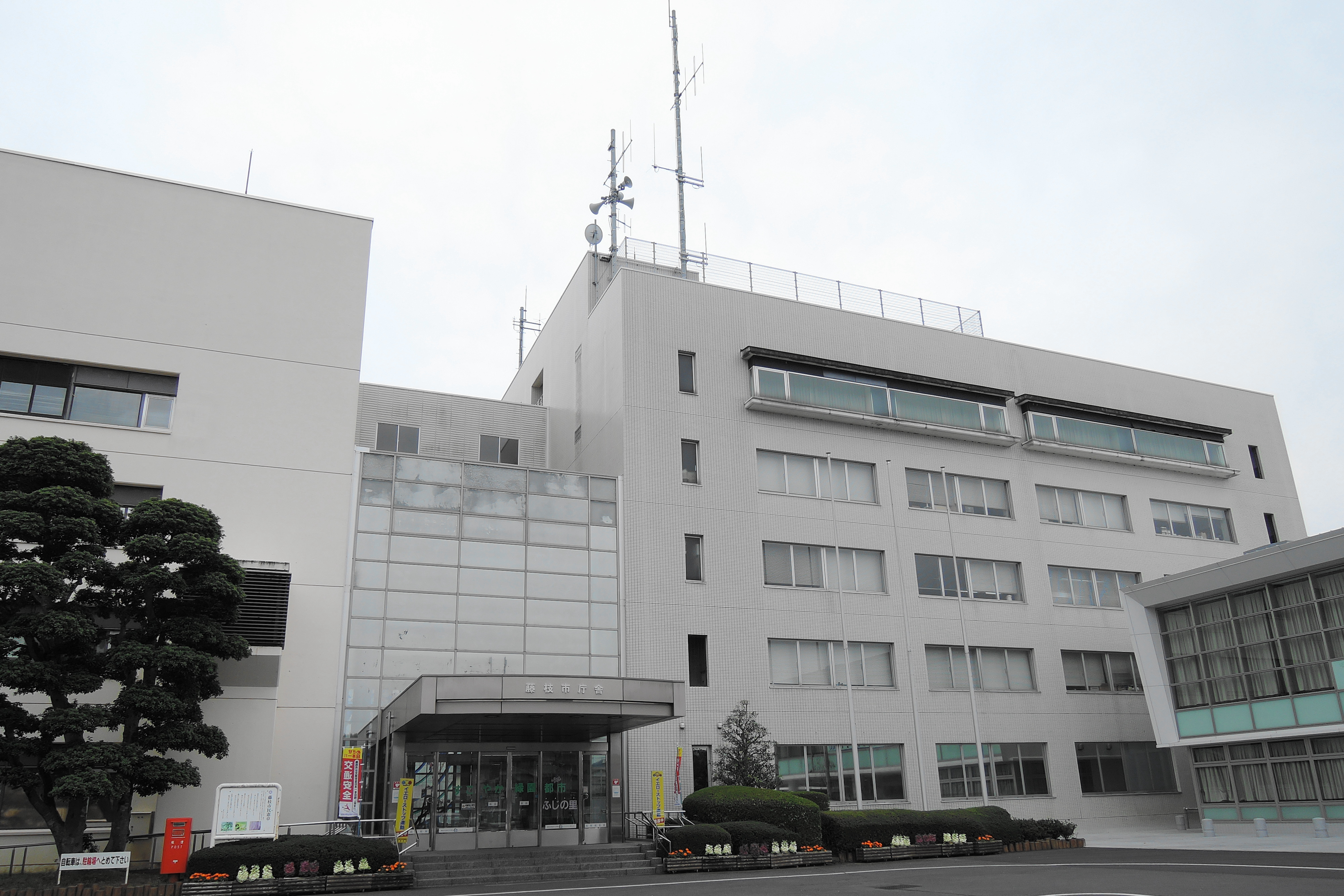
Fujieda City Hall

Fujieda (藤枝市, Fujieda-shi) is a city located in Shizuoka Prefecture, Japan. As of 30 April 2019, the city has an estimated population of 145,032 in 59,480 households, and a population density of 750 persons per km^{2}. The total area of the city was 194.06 square kilometres (74.93 sq mi). Fujieda is a member of the World Health Organization’s Alliance for Healthy Cities (AFHC).

== Geography ==
Fujieda is located in the Shida Plateau in central Shizuoka Prefecture between the Abe River and the Ōi River. The area enjoys a warm maritime climate with hot, humid summers and mild, cool winters.

=== Neighboring municipalities ===
- Shizuoka Prefecture
  - Shimada
  - Shizuoka
  - Yaizu

== Demographics ==
Per Japanese census data, the population of Fujieda grown rapidly over the past 50 years.

Historical population
Year	Pop.	±%
1960	77,169	—
1970	88,787	+15.1%
1980	114,882	+29.4%
1990	133,147	+15.9%
2000	141,643	+6.4%
2010	142,183	+0.4%
2015	143,605	+1.0%
2020	141,342	−1.6%

=== Climate ===
The city has a climate characterized by characterized by hot and humid summers, and relatively mild winters (Köppen climate classification Cfa). The average annual temperature in Fujieda is 15.9 °C. The average annual rainfall is 2159 mm with September as the wettest month. The temperatures are highest on average in August, at around 26.8 °C, and lowest in January, at around 5.7 °C.

== History ==
Under the Tokugawa shogunate of Edo period Japan, much of the area of present-day Fujieda was part of Tanaka Domain, and its castle formed part of the eastern outlying fortifications of Sunpu. The town also developed as Fujieda-juku, a post town on the Tōkaidō highway connecting Edo with Kyoto.

During the cadastral reform of the early Meiji period in 1889, Fujieda-juku became Fujieda Town within Shida District Shizuoka Prefecture. Fujieda Station on the Tōkaidō Main Line railway opened on April 16, 1889, leading to development of the surrounding area. On March 31, 1954, Fujieda merged with neighboring Aoshima Town and four neighboring villages to form Fujieda City. Setoya Village merged on February 15, 1955 and Hirohata Village on April 1, 1957.

On January 1, 2009, the neighboring town of Okabe (from Shida District) was merged into Fujieda. Shida District was dissolved as a result of this merger.

== Government ==
Fujieda has a mayor-council form of government with a directly elected mayor and a unicameral city legislature of 22 members.

== Economy ==
Fujieda is primarily a bedroom community for nearby Shizuoka. The local economy is dominated by agriculture (tea, strawberry, rice, shiitake) and light manufacturing, including pharmaceuticals, beverages, and food processing.

== Education ==
Fujieda has 17 public elementary schools and ten public junior high schools operated by the city government. and three public high schools operated by the Shizuoka Prefectural Board of Education. There are also two private middle schools and three private high schools. The prefectural also operates one special education school for disabled children. In addition, Shizuoka Sangyo University has a campus in Fujieda, and the agricultural fields for Shizuoka University are also located in the city.

== Sport ==
Fujieda is represented in the J. League of football by its local club Fujieda MYFC, currently competing in J2 League, the second tier of Japanese professional football. In the 1980s and 1990s the city was represented in the Japan Soccer League and former Japan Football League by local clubs Fujieda City Hall SC, which still competes in the prefectural divisions, and Chuo Bohan SC/Fujieda Blux, which moved out of town in 1994 to become Avispa Fukuoka.

The city also home of Fujieda Higashi High School, four-time winners of All Japan High School Soccer Tournament. Notable alumnus including Makoto Hasebe and Masashi Nakayama.

== Transportation ==
=== Railway ===
Central Japan Railway Company - Tōkaidō Main Line

- Fujieda

=== Highway ===
- National Route 1 - Fujieda Bypass, Okabe Bypass

== Sister cities ==
- Penrith, New South Wales, Australia, since November 3, 1984
- Yangju, Gyeonggi Province, South Korea, since August 24, 2009

== Local attractions ==
- Tanaka Castle
- Shida Gunga ruins, National Historic Site
- Utsunoya Pass, a National Historic Site
- Gardens of Renge-ji temple

== Notable people from Fujieda ==
- Motoyuki Akahori, professional baseball player
- Shin Asahina, professional soccer player
- Shizuo Fujieda, novelist
- Makoto Hasebe, professional soccer player
- Toshiya Ishii, professional soccer player
- Tatsuya Ishikawa, professional soccer player
- Masashi Nakayama, professional soccer player
- Hiroshi Nanami, professional soccer player
- Kunio Ogawa, novelist
- Kentaro Ohi, professional soccer player
- Ryu Okada, professional soccer player
- Yoshikazu Suzuki, professional soccer player
- Daiya Tono, professional soccer player
- Takeshi Watanabe, professional soccer player
- Nobuhisa Yamada, professional soccer player
