= CA37 =

CA37, CA-37, or California 37 may refer to:

- California's 37th congressional district, a congressional district in the U.S. state of California
- California State Route 37, a state highway in the northern part of California
- USS Tuscaloosa (CA-37), a United States Navy cruiser
- California 37 (album), the sixth studio album from pop rock band Train
- Calcium-37 (Ca-37 or ^{37}Ca), an isotope of calcium
- Caproni Ca.37, an Italian aircraft
- Bentenjima Station, a railway station in Chūō-ku, Hamamatsu, Japan (station code: CA37)
