= CA-38 =

CA-38 or CA38 may refer to:

- California's 38th congressional district, an electoral division in the State of California
- USS San Francisco (CA-38), a United States Navy New Orleans-class heavy cruiser
- California State Route 38, a highway in the State of California
- Calcium-38 (Ca-38 or ^{38}Ca), an isotope of calcium
- Caproni Ca.38, an Italian aircraft
- Araimachi Station, a railway station in Kosai, Shizuoka Prefecture, Japan (station code: CA38)
