= CA39 =

CA39 or CA-39 may refer to:

- California State Route 39
- California's 39th congressional district
- USS Quincy (CA-39), a United States Navy cruiser
- Calcium-39 (Ca-39 or ^{39}Ca), an isotope of calcium
- Caproni Ca.39, an Italian aircraft
- Washizu Station, a railway station in Kosai, Shizuoka Prefecture, Japan (station code: CA39)
