= CA35 =

CA35 or CA-35 may refer to:

- California's 35th congressional district
- California State Route 35
- California State Route 35 (1934–1964), the road originally designated California State Route 35
- USS Indianapolis (CA-35), a United States Navy heavy cruiser
- Calcium-35 (Ca-35 or ^{35}Ca), an isotope of calcium
- Takatsuka Station, a railway station in Hamamatsu, Japan (station code: CA35)
