= Lancia Tipo 4 =

Italian aircraft engine constructed by Lancia

Tipo 4
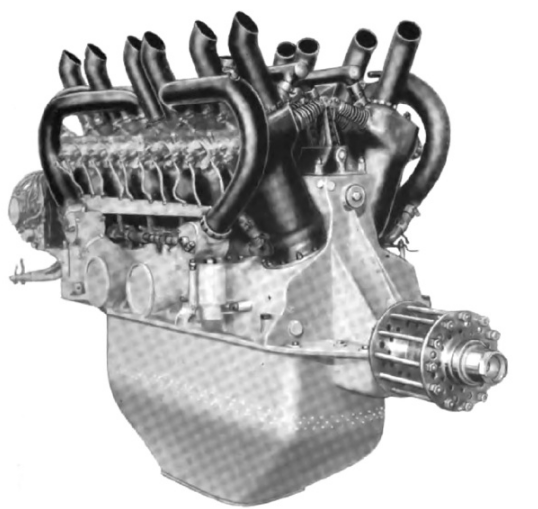
- Type: V-12 aero engine
- Manufacturer: Lancia
- First run: 1916

The Lancia Tipo 4 was an Italian aircraft engine constructed by Lancia in the mid-1910s.

== History ==
This water-cooled V-12 aircraft engine was built in 1916 and had a 50-degree angle between the cylinder banks. The Tipo 4 had a 120.7 mm (4.75 in) bore and a 180.1 mm (7.09 in) stroke. The engine’s total displacement was 24.7 L (1,508 cu in). It produced 239 kW (320 hp) at 1,380 rpm and 283 kW (380 hp) at 1,420 rpm. The Tipo 4 engine was direct drive and weighed 340 kg (740 lb). The engine shipped to the United States in late 1917.

== Applications ==
- Caproni Ca.37
- Caproni Ca.38

== Specifications ==
Data from Old Machine Press.

=== General characteristics ===
- Type: V-12 piston engine
- Bore: 120.7 mm (4.75 in)
- Stroke: 180.1 mm (7.09 in)
- Displacement: 24.7 L (1,508 cu in)
- Dry weight: 340 kg (740 lb)

=== Performance ===
- Power output: 283 kW (380 hp) at 1,420 rpm

== See also ==
Comparable engines

- Rolls-Royce Eagle
- Sunbeam Matabele

Related lists

- List of aircraft engines
