= Maisaka Station =

Railway station in Hamamatsu, Japan

CA36 Maisaka Station 舞阪駅
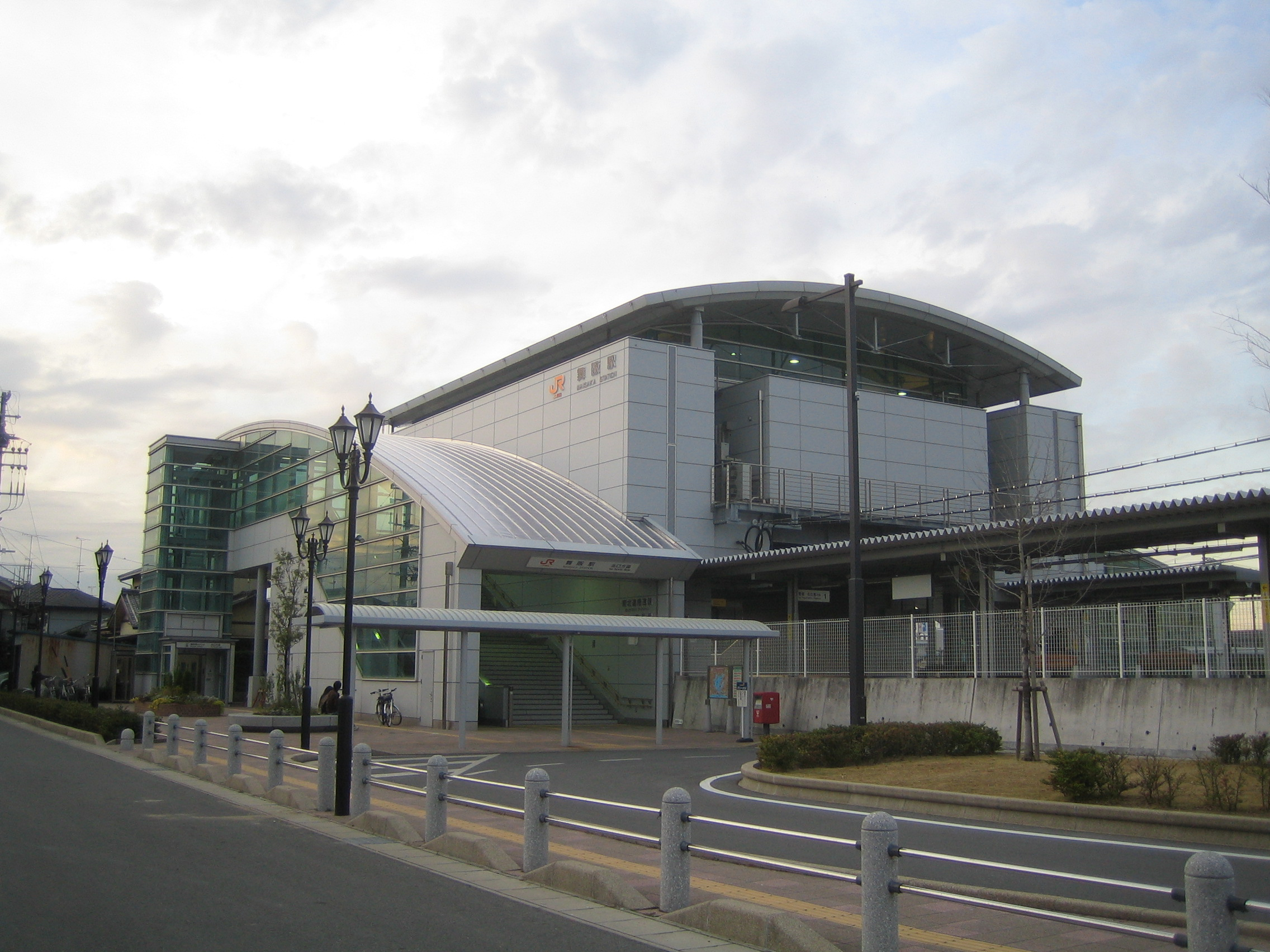
- JR Maisaka Station in 2006

General information
- Location: Magoori, Chuo-ku, Hamamatsu-shi, Shizuoka-ken
- Coordinates: 34°41′8″N 137°37′38″E
- Operator: JR Central
- Line: Tokaido Main Line
- Distance: 267.5 kilometers from Tokyo
- Platforms: 1 side + 1 island platform

Other information
- Status: Staffed
- Station code: CA36

History
- Opened: September 1, 1888
- Former names: Magoori (to 1940)

Passengers
- 2023–2024: 4,859 daily
Location
- Location within Shizuoka Prefecture Location within Japan

Maisaka Station (舞阪駅, Maisaka-eki) is a railway station in Chūō-ku, Hamamatsu, Shizuoka Prefecture, Japan, operated by the Central Japan Railway Company (JR Tōkai ).

== Lines ==
Maisaka Station is served by the JR Tōkai Tōkaidō Main Line, and is located 267.5 kilometers from the official starting point of the line at Tokyo.

== Station layout ==
Maisaka Station has a side platform serving Track 1 and an island platform serving Track 2 and Track 3, connected by a footbridge. Track 1 is used only during peak hours. The station building has automated ticket machines, TOICA automated turnstiles and is staffed.

=== Platforms ===
1	■ Tōkaidō Main Line	For Toyohashi, Nagoya, Ogaki, Maibara
2	■ Tōkaidō Main Line	For Hamamatsu, Shizuoka, Mishima

== Adjacent stations ==
«	Service	»
Central Japan Railway Company
Tōkaidō Main Line
Takatsuka	Special Rapid	Bentenjima
Takatsuka	New Rapid	Bentenjima
Takatsuka	Local	Bentenjima

== Station history ==
Maisaka Station was opened on September 1, 1888, when the section of the Tōkaidō Main Line connecting Hamamatsu Station with Ōbu Station was completed. It was originally named Magoori Station (馬郡駅, Magoori-eki). It was renamed Maisaka on December 1, 1888, but the kanji spelling of its name assumed its present form only in 1940. Regularly scheduled freight service was discontinued in 1971.

Station numbering was introduced to the section of the Tōkaidō Line operated JR Central in March 2018; Maisaka Station was assigned station number CA36.

== Passenger statistics ==
In fiscal 2017, the station was used by an average of 2719 passengers daily (boarding passengers only).

== Surrounding area ==
- Lake Hamana

== See also ==
- List of railway stations in Japan
