= Araimachi Station =

Railway station in Kosai, Shizuoka Prefecture, Japan

CA38 Araimachi Station 新居駅
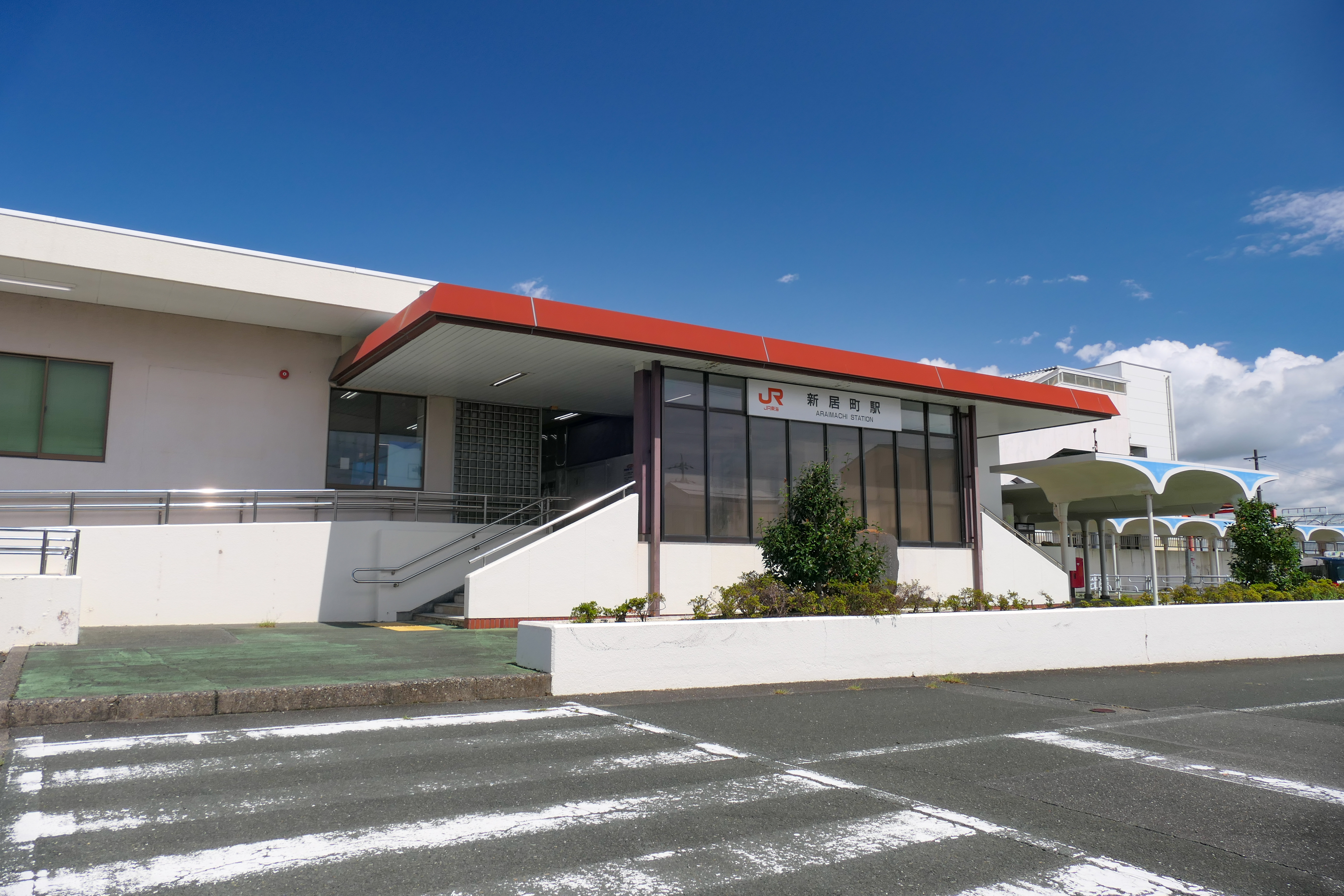
- JR Araimachi Station in 2021

General information
- Location: Araichō-Arai, Kosai-shi, Shizuoka-ken; Japan
- Coordinates: 34°41′39″N 137°34′07″E
- Operator: JR Central
- Line: Tokaido Main Line
- Distance: 272.9 kilometers from Tokyo
- Platforms: 1 side + 1 island platform

Other information
- Status: Staffed
- Station code: CA38
- Website: Official website

History
- Opened: January 10, 1915

Passengers
- 2023–2024: 3,430 daily
Location
- Location within Shizuoka Prefecture Location within Japan

Araimachi Station (新居町駅, Araimachi-eki) is a railway station in the city of Kosai, Shizuoka Prefecture, Japan, operated by Central Japan Railway Company (JR Tōkai).

== Lines ==
Araimachi Station is served by the Tōkaidō Main Line, and is located 272.9 kilometers from the starting point of the line at Tokyo Station.

== Station layout ==
The station has a side platform serving Track 1, and an island platform serving Track 2 and Track 3. The platforms are connected by a footbridge. The station building has automated ticket machines, TOICA automated turnstiles and a staffed ticket office.

=== Platforms ===
| 1 | ■ Tōkaidō Main Line | Varies |
| 2 | ■ Tōkaidō Main Line | For Toyohashi, Nagoya, Ogaki and Maibara |
| 3 | ■ Tōkaidō Main Line | For Hamamatsu, Shizuoka, and Numazu |

== Adjacent stations ==
| « | Service | » |
Central Japan Railway Company
Tōkaidō Main Line
| Bentenjima | Special Rapid | Washizu |
| Bentenjima | New Rapid | Washizu |
| Bentenjima | Local | Washizu |

== History ==
On September 1, 1888, the section of the Tōkaidō Main Line connecting Hamamatsu Station with Ōbu Station was completed. Araimachi Station was established on January 10, 1915, for both passenger service and freight. Freight service was discontinued on April 26, 1971.

Station numbering was introduced to the section of the Tōkaidō Line operated JR Central in March 2018; Araimachi Station was assigned station number CA38.

== Passenger statistics ==
In fiscal 2017, the station was used by an average of 2252 passengers daily (boarding passengers only).

== Surrounding area ==
- Lake Hamana
- Japan National Route 301

== See also ==
- List of railway stations in Japan
