= Bentenjima Station =

Railway station in Hamamatsu, Japan

CA37 Bentenjima Station 弁天島駅
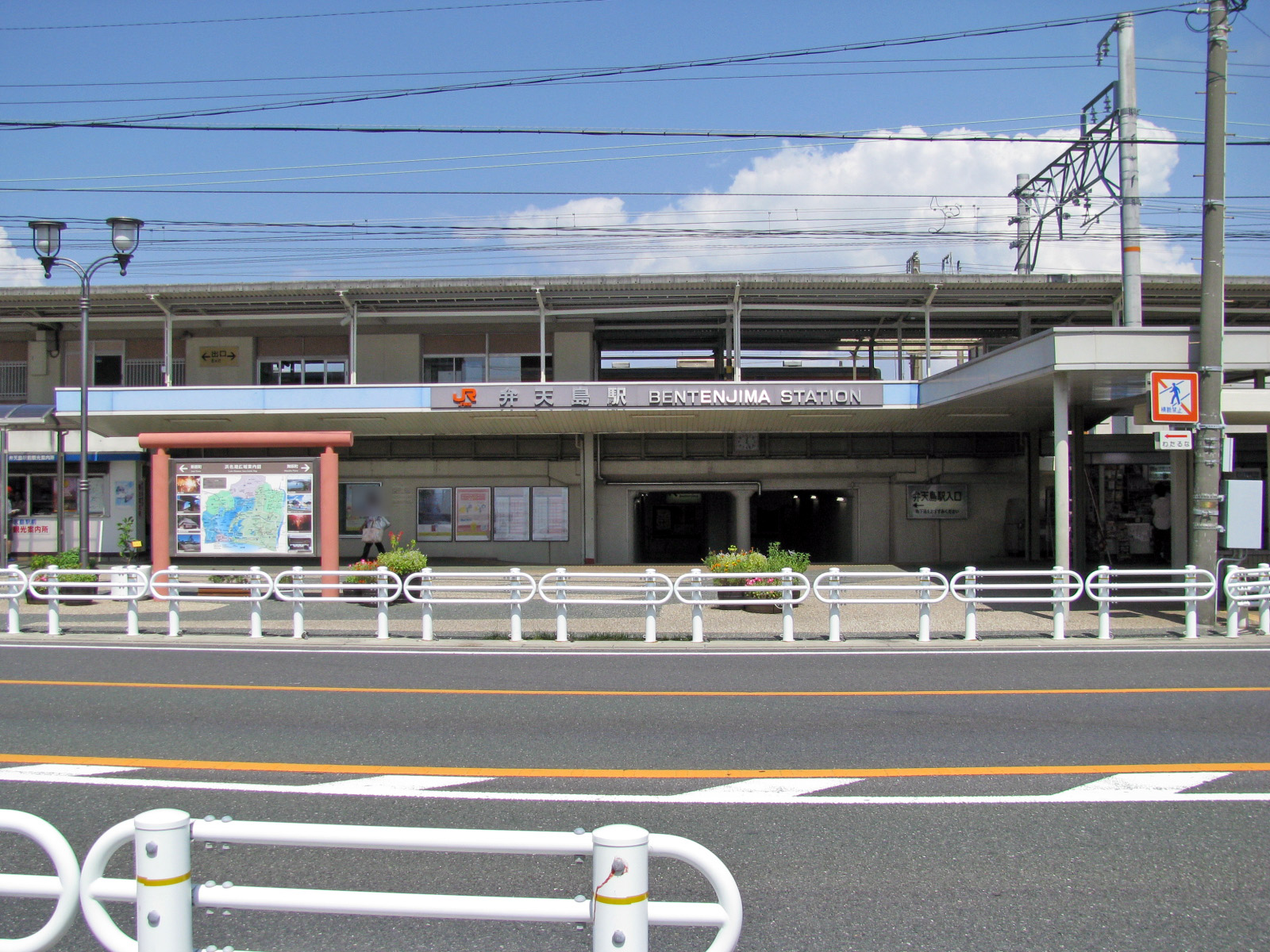
- JR Bentenjima Station in 2008

General information
- Location: Maisaka-cho, Bentenjima, Chūō-ku, Hamamatsu-She, Shizuoka-ken; Japan
- Coordinates: 34°41′24.81″N 137°36′10.52″E
- Operator: JR Central
- Line: Tokaido Main Line
- Distance: 269.8 kilometers from Tokyo
- Platforms: 1 island platform

Other information
- Status: Staffed
- Station code: CA37

History
- Opened: July 11, 1906

Passengers
- 2023–2024: 1,372 daily
Location
- Location within Shizuoka Prefecture Location within Japan

Bentenjima Station (弁天島駅, Bentenjima-eki) is a railway station in Chūō-ku, Hamamatsu, Shizuoka Prefecture, Japan, operated by the Central Japan Railway Company (JR Tōkai ).

== Lines ==
Bentenjima Station is served by the JR Tōkai Tōkaidō Main Line, and is located 269.8 kilometers from the official starting point of the line at Tokyo.

The Tōkaidō Shinkansen runs directly adjacent to the north side of the station, without stopping.

== Station layout ==
Bentenjima Station has a single island platform serving Track 1 and Track 2. The platforms are unusually wide, and the station building is located underneath the platforms. The station is staffed.

=== Platforms ===
1	■ Tōkaidō Main Line	For Hamamatsu, Shizuoka, Mishima
2	■ Tōkaidō Main Line	For Toyohashi, Nagoya, Ogaki, Maibara

== Adjacent stations ==
«	Service	»
Central Japan Railway Company
Tōkaidō Main Line
Maisaka	Special Rapid	Araimachi
Maisaka	New Rapid	Araimachi
Maisaka	Local	Araimachi

== Station history ==
Bentenjima Station was opened on July 11, 1906 when the section of the Tōkaidō Main Line connecting Hamamatsu Station with Ōbu Station was completed. It was originally a seasonal station, open only during the summer months for visitors to the nearby beach resorts. It became a permanent station on September 1, 1916. Regularly scheduled freight service was discontinued in 1971.

Station numbering was introduced to the section of the Tōkaidō Line operated JR Central in March 2018; Bentenjima Station was assigned station number CA37.

== Passenger statistics ==
In fiscal 2017, the station was used by an average of 792 passengers daily (boarding passengers only).

== Surrounding area ==
- Japan National Route 1

== See also ==
- List of railway stations in Japan
