= Takatsuka Station =

Railway station in Hamamatsu, Japan

CA35 Takatsuka Station 高塚駅
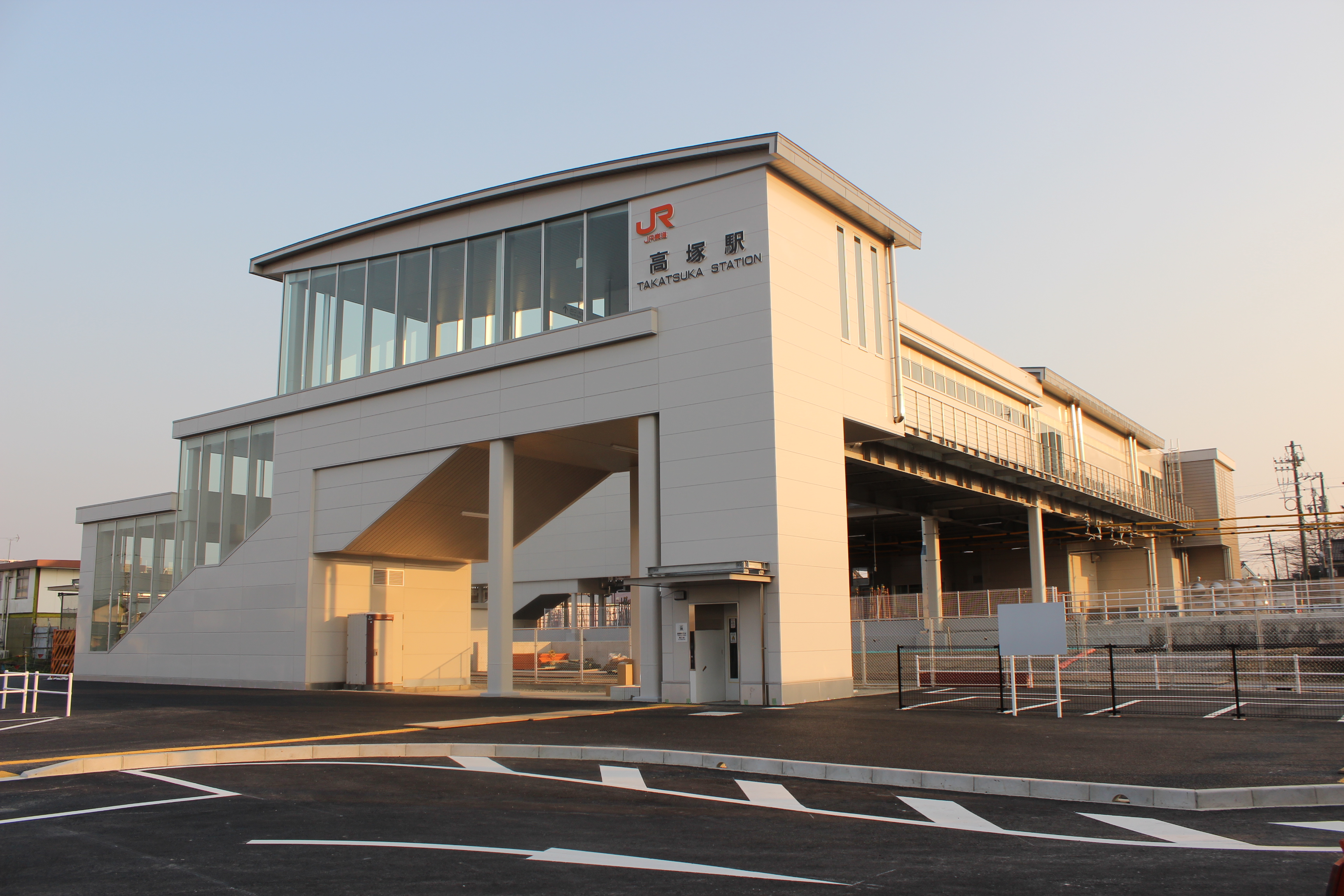
- The north side of Takatsuka Station in February 2015

General information
- Location: Takatsuka-cho, Chūō-ku, Hamamatsu-shi, Shizuoka-ken; Japan
- Coordinates: 34°41′25″N 137°40′54″E
- Operator: JR Central
- Line: ■ Tokaido Main Line
- Distance: 262.4 km from Tokyo
- Platforms: 1 side + 1 island platform
- Connections: Bus terminal

Other information
- Station code: CA35

History
- Opened: 1 July 1929

Passengers
- 2023–2024: 6,029 daily
Location
- Location within Shizuoka Prefecture Location within Japan

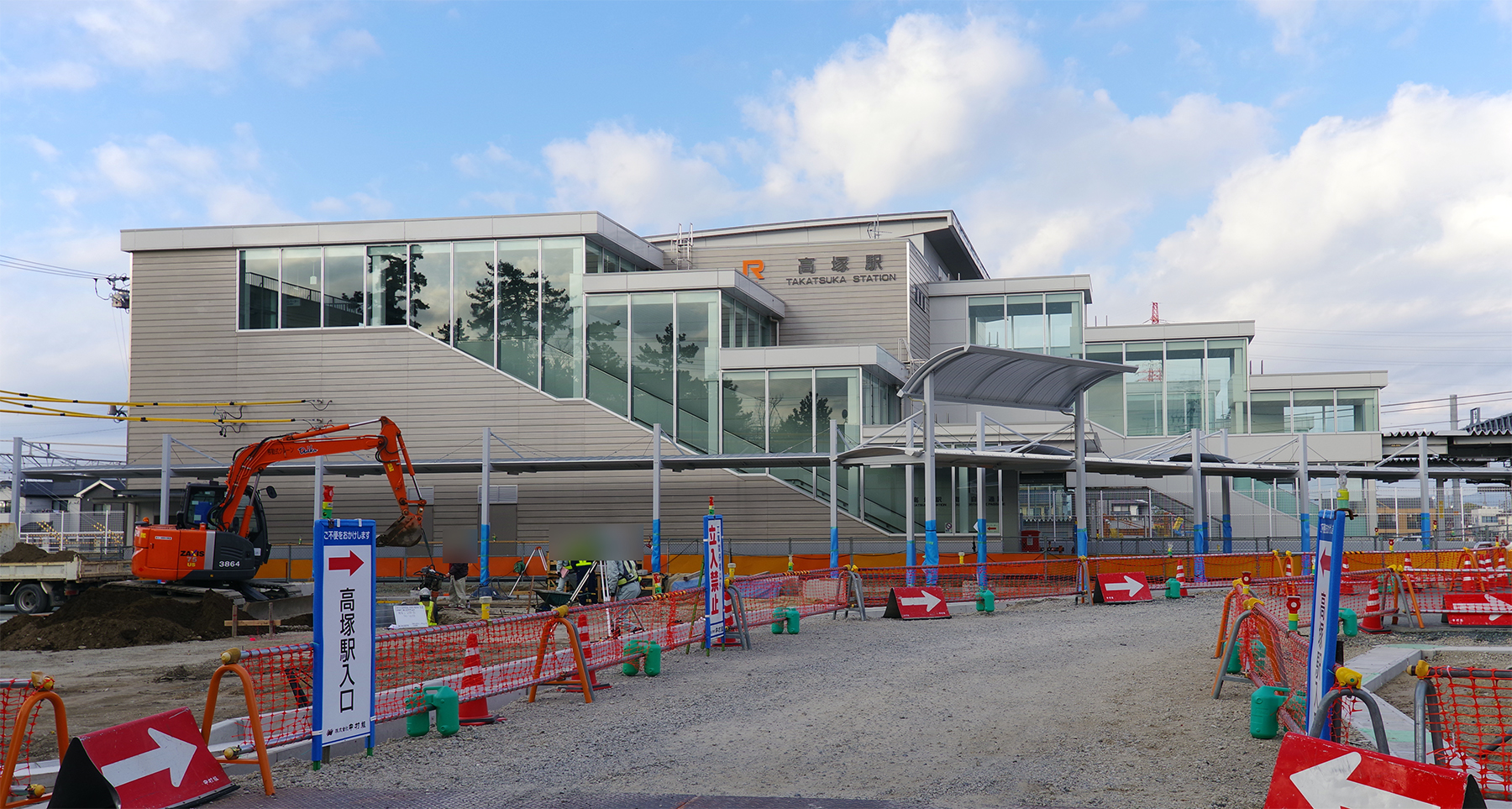
The south side of the station in January 2017

Takatsuka Station (高塚駅, Takatsuka-eki) is a railway station in Chūō-ku, Hamamatsu, Shizuoka Prefecture, Japan, operated by the Central Japan Railway Company (JR Tōkai ).

== Lines ==
Takatsuka Station is served by the JR Tōkai Tōkaidō Main Line, and is located 262.4 kilometers from the official starting point of the line at Tokyo.

== Station layout ==
Takatsuka Station has one side platform serving track 1, and one island platform, serving tracks 2 and 3 (which were formerly used by freight trains and is no longer in use). The two platforms are connected by a footbridge. The station building has automated ticket machines, TOICA automated turnstiles and is staffed.

=== Platforms ===
1	■ Tokaido Main Line	for Toyohashi, Nagoya, Ogaki, and Maebara
2	■ Tokaido Main Line	for Hamamatsu, Shizuoka, and Numazu
3	■ Tokaido Main Line	unused

== Adjacent stations ==
«	Service	»
Tokaido Main Line
Hamamatsu	Special Rapid	Maisaka
Hamamatsu	New Rapid	Maisaka
Hamamatsu	Local	Maisaka

== History ==
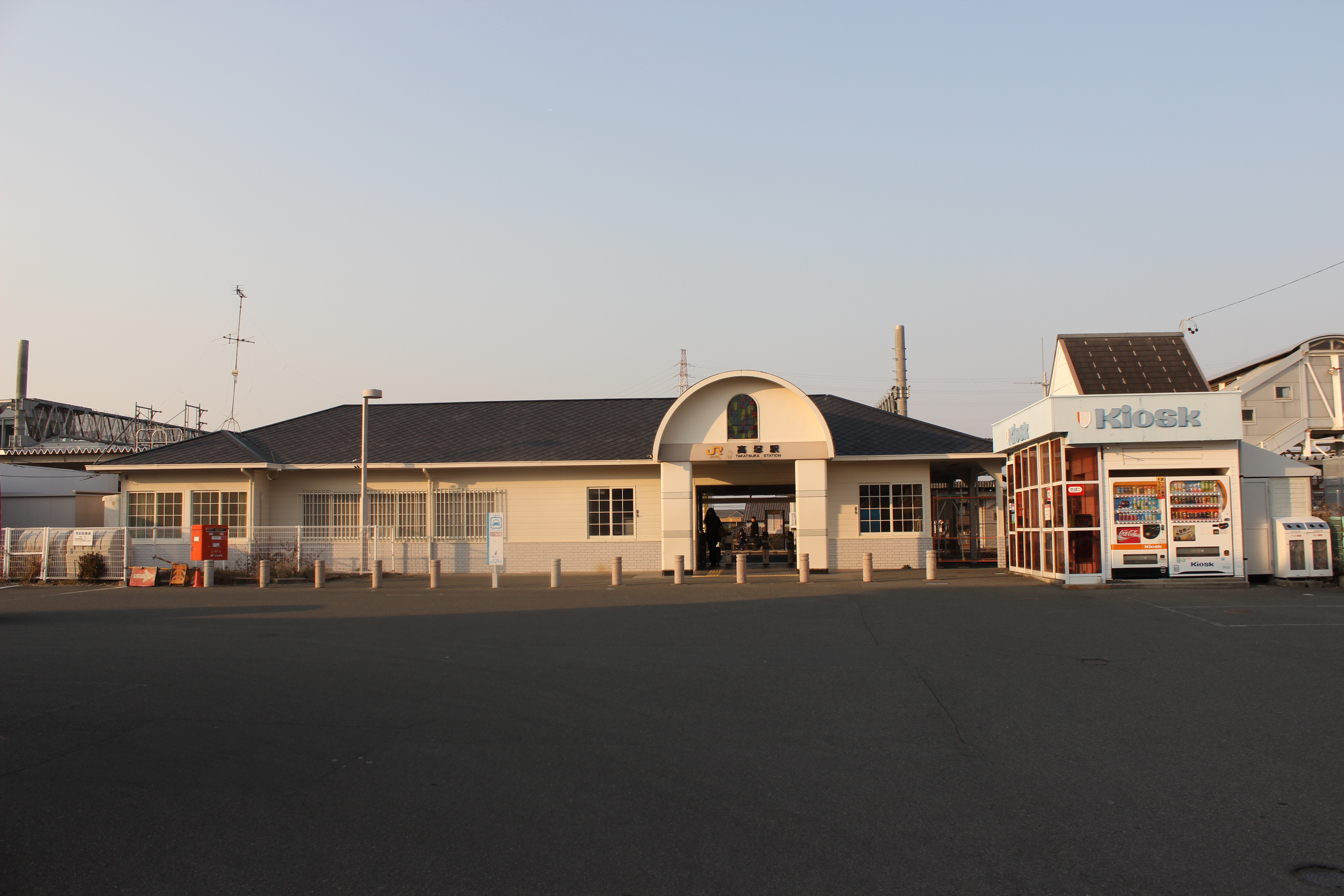
The former station building in February 2015

Takatsuka station opened on 1 July 1929. With the privatization of Japanese National Railways (JNR) on 1 April 1987, the station came under the control of JR Central.

Station numbering was introduced to the section of the Tōkaidō Line operated JR Central in March 2018; Takatsuka Station was assigned station number CA35.

== Passenger statistics ==
In fiscal 2017, the station was used by an average of 2820 passengers daily (boarding passengers only).

== Surrounding area ==
- Suzuki Motors head office

== See also ==
- List of railway stations in Japan
