= Washizu Station =

Railway station in Kosai, Shizuoka Prefecture, Japan

CA39 Washizu Station 鷲津駅
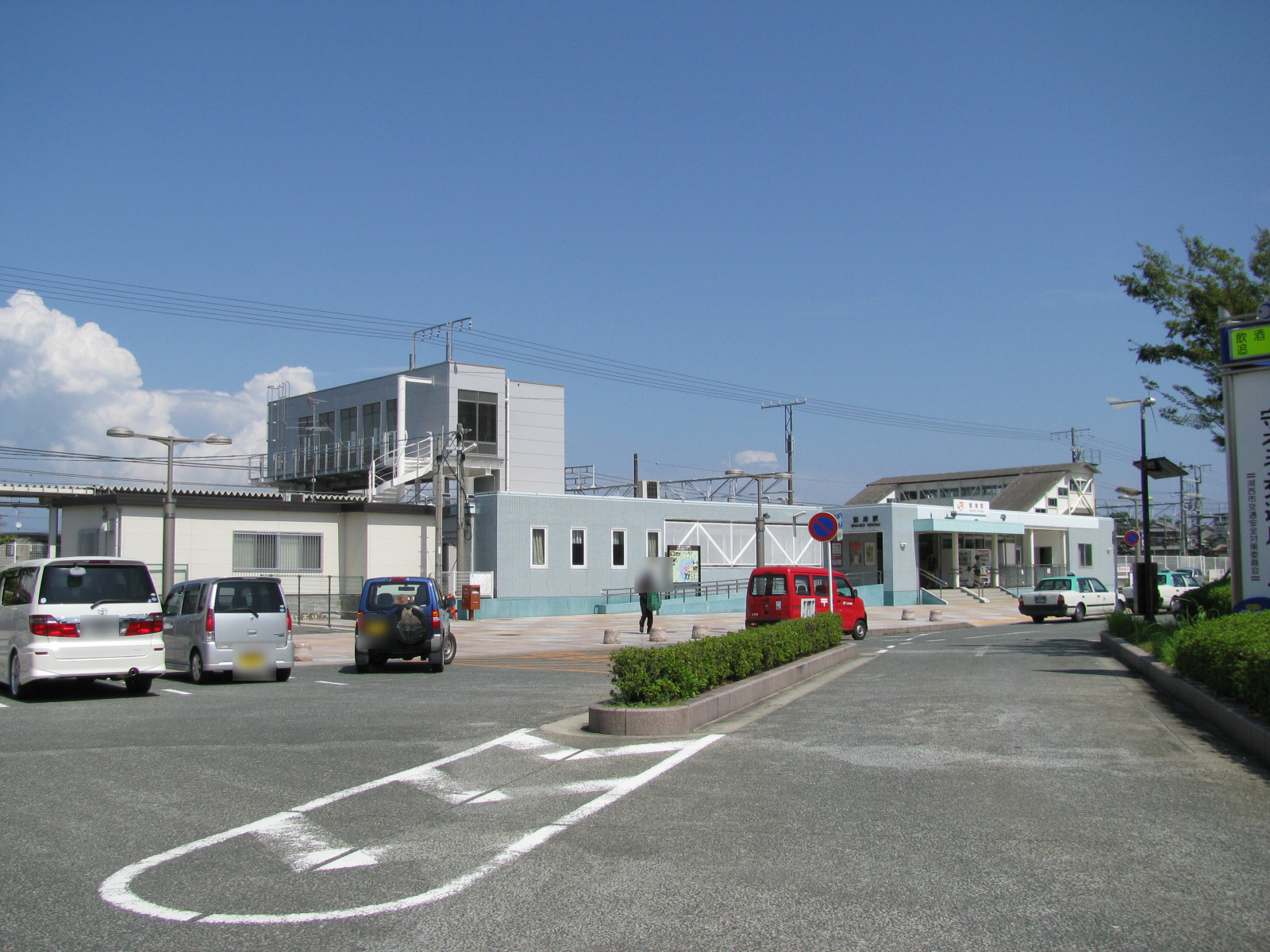
- JR Washizu Station in 2008

General information
- Location: 1295-14 Washizu, Kosai, Shizuoka （静岡県湖西市鷲津1295-14） Japan
- Coordinates: 34°43′01″N 137°32′45″E
- Operator: JR Central
- Line: Tōkaidō Main Line
- Distance: 276.6 kilometers from Tokyo
- Platforms: 2 island platforms

Construction
- Structure type: Ground level

Other information
- Status: Staffed
- Station code: CA39
- Website: Official website

History
- Opened: January 10, 1915

Passengers
- 2023–2024: 5,574 daily
Location
- Location within Shizuoka Prefecture Location within Japan

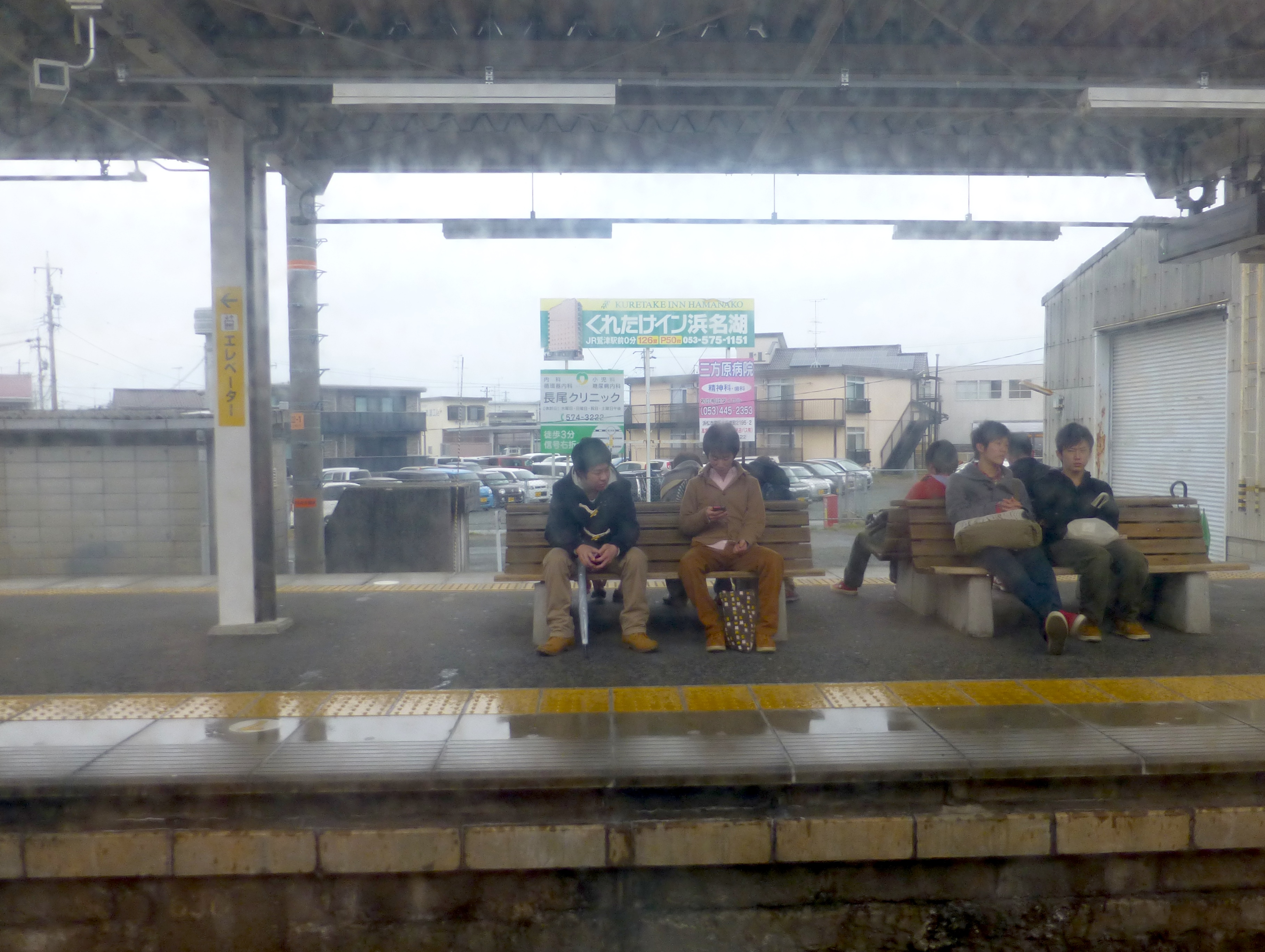
Station platform, 2014.

Washizu Station (鷲津駅, Washizu-eki) is a railway station in the city of Kosai, Shizuoka Prefecture, Japan, operated by Central Japan Railway Company (JR Tōkai).

== Lines ==
Washizu Station is served by the Tōkaidō Main Line, and is located 276.6 kilometers from the southern terminus of the line at Tokyo Station. This is approximately at the half-way point on the Tōkaidō Main Line between Tokyo Station and Nagoya Station.

== Station layout ==
The station has a side platform serving Track 1, and an island platform serving Track 2 and Track 3. The platforms are connected by a footbridge. The station building has automated ticket machines, TOICA automated turnstiles and a staffed ticket office.

=== Platforms ===
1	■ Tōkaidō Main Line	For Toyohashi and Nagoya
2	■ Tōkaidō Main Line	For Hamamatsu and Shizuoka
3	■ Tōkaidō Main Line	(siding)

== Adjacent stations ==
«	Service	»
Central Japan Railway Company
Tōkaidō Main Line
Araimachi	Special Rapid	Shinjohara
Araimachi	New Rapid	Shinjohara
Araimachi	Local	Shinjohara

== Station history ==
On September 1, 1888, the section of the Tōkaidō Main Line connecting Hamamatsu Station with Ōbu Station was completed, and a rail siding was established at the site of present-day Washizu Station. As the area was completely rural at the time, stops were discontinued from August 1892; however, due to the strong petition by the surrounding villages, a station was established on January 10, 1915, for both passenger service and freight. Freight service was discontinued on April 26, 1971.

Station numbering was introduced to the section of the Tōkaidō Line operated JR Central in March 2018; Washizu Station was assigned station number CA39.

== Passenger statistics ==
In fiscal 2017, the station was used by an average of 3480 passengers daily.

== Surrounding area ==
- Lake Hamana
- Kosai City Hall

== See also ==
- List of railway stations in Japan
