= Caproni Ca.37 =

Ca.37
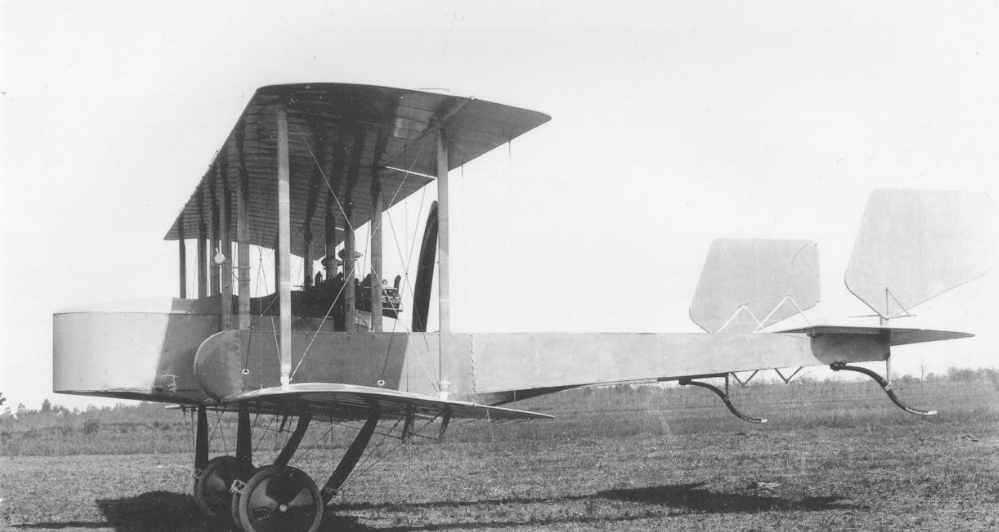

General information
- Type: Ground attack aircraft
- National origin: Italy
- Manufacturer: Caproni
- Number built: 1

History
- First flight: 1916

The Caproni Ca.37 was a ground attack aircraft designed and built in Italy by Caproni around 1916.

== Design and development ==
During 1916 Caproni embarked on the design of a small light ground attack aircraft which followed the design philosophy of its much larger cousins the Ca.3 and Ca.4.

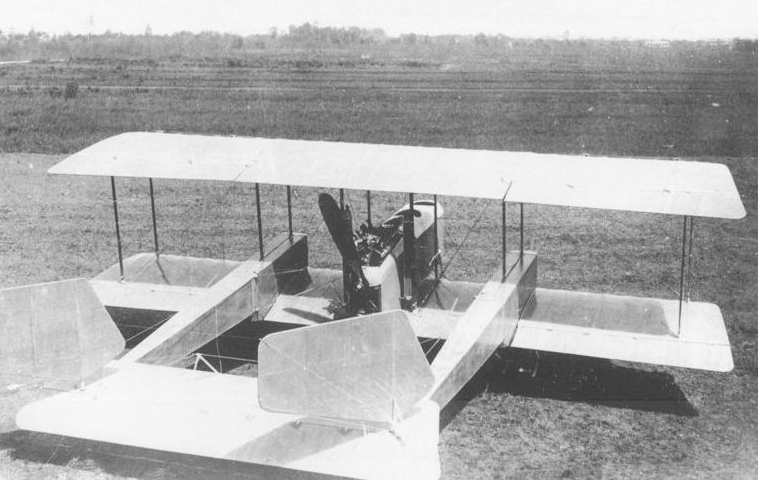
3/4 rear view of the Ca.37

The Ca.37 followed the twin boom layout with central nacelle, which housed the tandem cockpits and the 190 kW (250 hp) Lancia Tipo 4 6-cylinder in-line piston engine, driving a 2-bladed pusher propeller. The tail-plane spanned across the two tail-booms and mounted two all-flying rudders for yaw control. Twin main-wheel units were strut mounted under each boom which also carried wooden tail-skids.

The front cockpit was to house a gunner with a flexibly mounted machine-gun. Small bombs were also to be carried for trench attacks and anti-personnel attacks.

Limited further development, in the form of streamlined pod and booms, was carried out as the Ca.38, but no production resulted.

== Variants ==
Ca.37
The sole Ca.37 prototype.
Ca.38
A new-build aircraft, or conversion of the sole Ca.37, with streamlined pod and booms for improved performance, but still no production orders.

== Specifications (Ca.37) ==
Data from Aeroplani Caproni

General characteristics

- Crew: 2
- Length: 11.2 m (36 ft 9 in)
- Wingspan: 11.3 m (37 ft 1 in)
- Wing area: 65 m^{2} (700 sq ft)
- Empty weight: 1,300 kg (2,866 lb)
- Gross weight: 1,800 kg (3,968 lb)
- Powerplant: 1 × Lancia Tipo 4 6-cylinder in-line water-cooled piston engine, 190 kW (250 hp)
- Propellers: 2-bladed fixed pitch wooden pusher propeller

Performance

- Maximum speed: 165 km/h (103 mph, 89 kn) Ca.37 (170 km/h (110 mph; 92 kn) Ca.38)

Armament

- Guns: 1x flexibly mounted machine gun in the nose cockpit plus unspecified other armament
