= Higashi-Yashio =

Higashi-Yashio 東八潮
- District
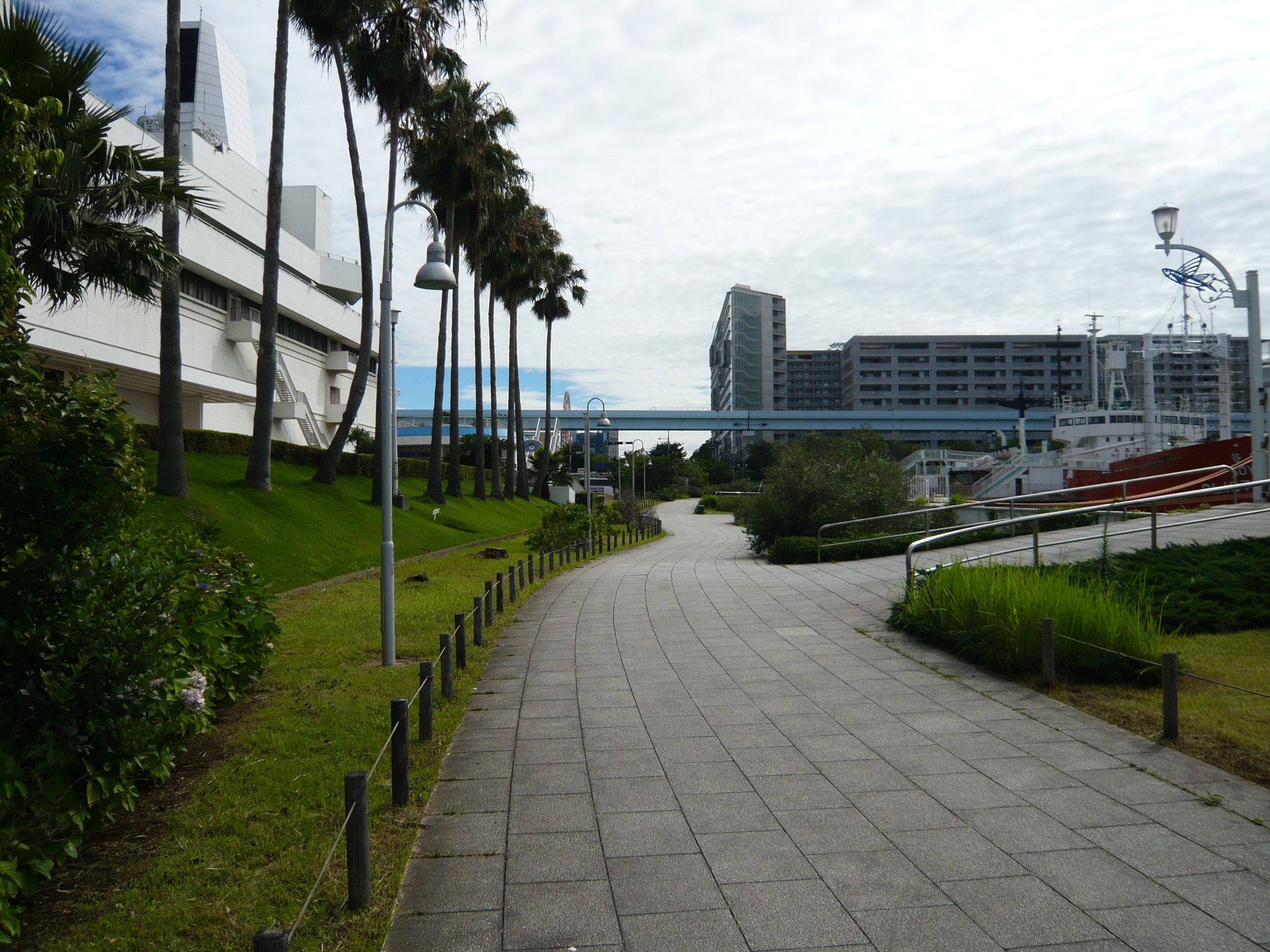
- East Yashio Park

- Location of Higashi-Yashio within Tokyo Location of Higashi-Yashio within Tokyo Bay
- Coordinates: 35°37′14.94″N 139°46′17.0″E
- Country: Japan
- Region: Kantō
- Prefecture: Tokyo
- Ward: Shinagawa
- Established: -

Population (April 1, 2021)
  - Total: 0
- Time zone: UTC+9 (JST)
- Zip code: 135-0092
- Area code: 03

Higashi-Yashio (東八潮, Higashiyashio) is a district of Shinagawa, Tokyo, Japan. It is a single, discrete municipal unit, without any wards or sub-districts.

== Education ==
Shinagawa City Board of Education operates public elementary and junior high schools.

All of Higashi-Yashio is zoned to Jonan No. 2 Elementary School (城南第二小学校) and Tokai Junior High School (東海中学校).
