= Dōshūsei =

Proposal to reorganize prefectures in Japan

Dōshūsei (道州制, lit. 'circuit and state system') is a proposal to organize Japan into one circuit (dō) of Hokkaido and several new states (shū) that are each a combination of several prefectures. The states and circuit are proposed to have greater regional autonomy, similar to the United Kingdom. It was proposed by the Junichiro Koizumi administration, but has yet to materialize.

Most of the political parties in 2012 supported this reform.

== History ==
An early proposal to replace the prefectures with states (-shū) and transform Japan into a federal state was Ueki Emori's 1881 draft constitution (Toyodai private constitution, Tōyō Dai-Nihon-koku kokken-an), one of the more well-known and radical manifestations of the many so-called "private" (i.e. not government-sponsored) constitutional drafts that sprang from the Freedom and People's Rights Movement in the 1880s.

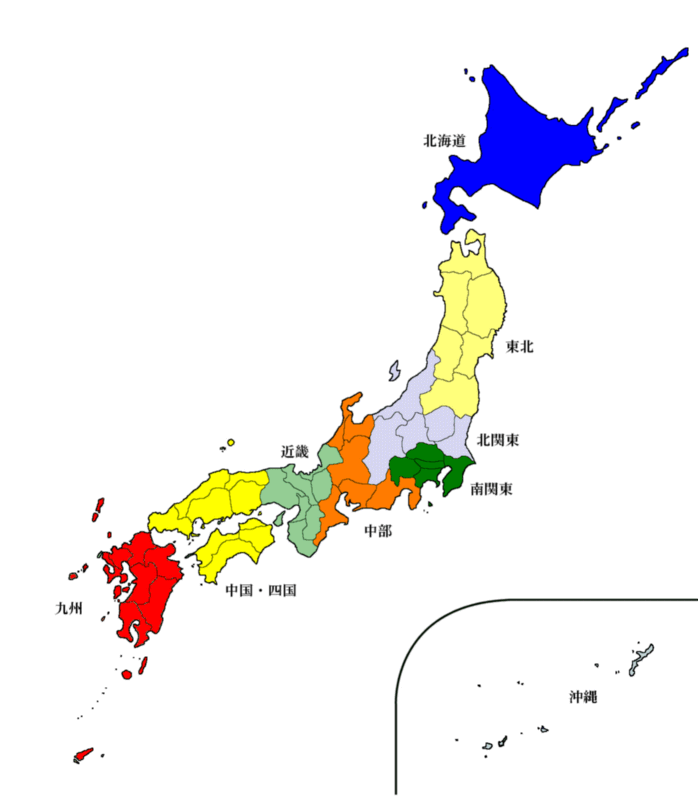
Project with 9 administrative divisions

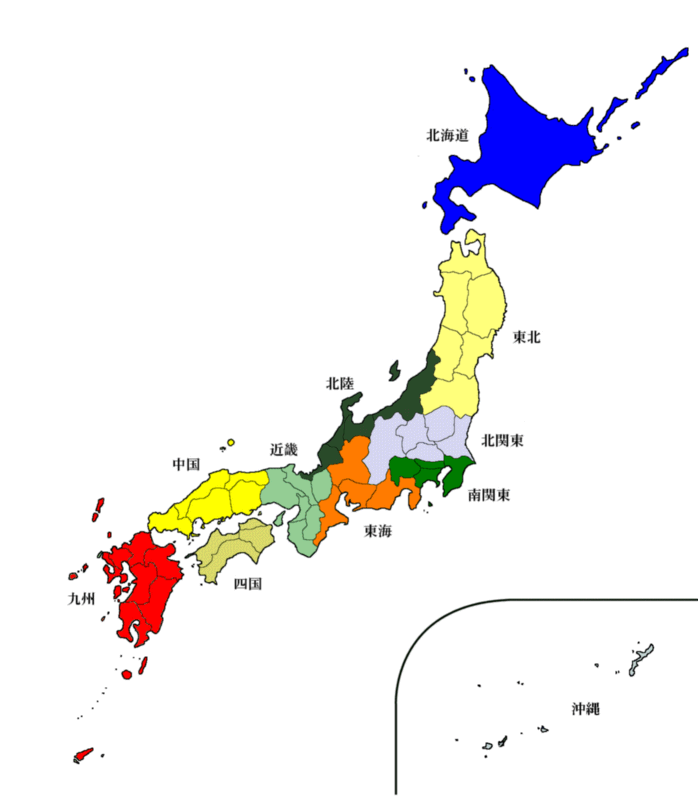
Project with 11 administrative divisions

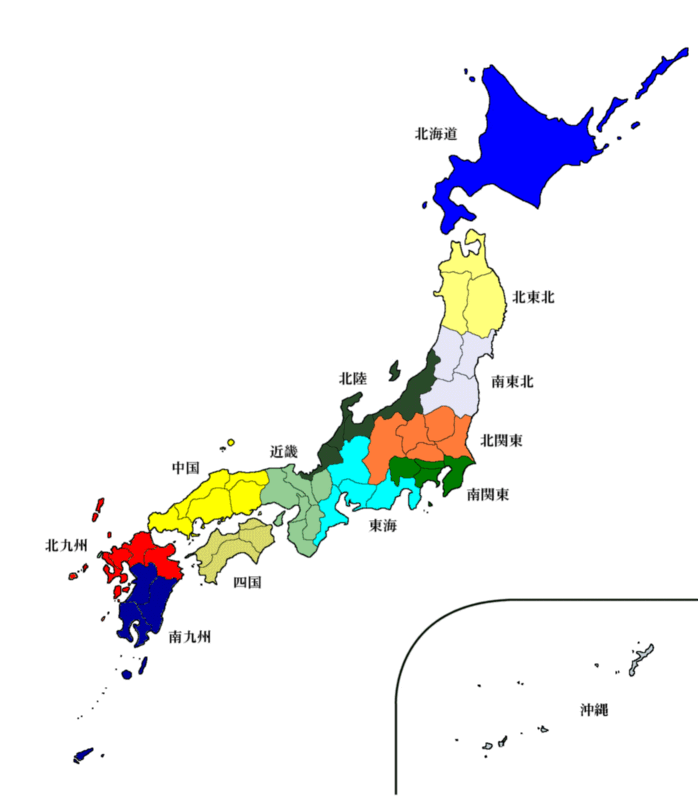
Project with 13 administrative divisions

== See also ==
- Osaka Metropolis Plan
- Chukyo Metropolis proposal
- Autonomous communities of Spain, similar grouping of Spanish provinces
