= Prefectures of Japan =

First level administrative division of Japan

Prefecture 都道府県 Todōfuken
- Category: First level administrative division of a unitary state
- Location: Japan
- Number: 47
- Populations: Lowest: 525,000 (Tottori); Highest: 14,261,000 (Tōkyō)
- Areas: Lowest: 1,861.7 km^{2} (718.8 sq mi) (Kagawa); Highest: 83,453.6 km^{2} (32,221.6 sq mi) (Hokkaido)
- Government: Prefecture government, central government
- Subdivisions: contiguous: municipalities partial: subprefectures historical/partial: districts

Japan is divided into 47 prefectures (都道府県, todōfuken; [tò̞.dó̞ó̞.ɸɯ̥̈.kè̞ɴ̀, -kéɴ̀]), which rank immediately below the national government and form the country's first level of jurisdiction and administrative division. They include 43 prefectures proper (県, ken), two urban prefectures (府, fu: Osaka and Kyoto), one regional prefecture (道, dō: Hokkaidō) and one metropolis (都, to: Tokyo). In 1868, the Meiji Fuhanken sanchisei administration created the first prefectures (urban fu and rural ken) to replace the urban and rural administrators (bugyō, daikan, etc.) in the parts of the country previously controlled directly by the shogunate and a few territories of rebels/shogunate loyalists who had not submitted to the new government such as Aizu/Wakamatsu. In 1871, all remaining feudal domains (han) were also transformed into prefectures, so that prefectures subdivided the whole country. In several waves of territorial consolidation, today's 47 prefectures were formed by the turn of the century. In many instances, these are contiguous with the ancient ritsuryō provinces of Japan.

Each prefecture's chief executive is a directly elected governor (知事, chiji). Ordinances and budgets are enacted by a unicameral assembly (議会, gikai) whose members are elected for four-year terms.

Under a set of 1888–1890 laws on local government until the 1920s, each prefecture (then only 3 -fu and 42 -ken; Hokkaidō and Okinawa-ken were subject to different laws until the 20th century) was subdivided into cities (市, shi) and districts (郡, gun) and each district into towns (町, chō/machi) and villages (村, son/mura). Hokkaidō has 14 subprefectures that act as general subprefectural bureaus (総合振興局, sōgō-shinkō-kyoku) and subprefectural bureaus (振興局) of the prefecture. Some other prefectures also have branch offices that carry out prefectural administrative functions outside the capital. Tokyo, the capital of Japan, is a merged city-prefecture; a metropolis, it has features of both cities and prefectures.

Each prefecture has its own emblem for identification, the equivalent of a coat of arms in the West.

== Background ==
The West's use of "prefecture" to label these Japanese regions stems from 16th-century Portuguese explorers and traders use of "prefeitura" to describe the fiefdoms they encountered there. Its original sense in Portuguese, however, was closer to "municipality" than "province". Today, in turn, Japan uses its word ken (県), meaning "prefecture", to identify Portuguese districts while in Brazil the word "Prefeitura" is used to refer to a city hall.

Those fiefs were headed by a local warlord or family. Though the fiefs have long since been dismantled, merged, and reorganized multiple times, and been granted legislative governance and oversight, the rough translation stuck.

The Meiji government established the current system in July 1871 with the abolition of the han system and establishment of the prefecture system (廃藩置県, haihan-chiken). Although there were initially over 300 prefectures, many of them being former han territories, this number was reduced to 72 in the latter part of 1871, and 47 in 1888. The Local Autonomy Law of 1947 gave more political power to prefectures, and installed prefectural governors and parliaments.

In 2003, Prime Minister Junichiro Koizumi proposed that the government consolidate the current prefectures into about 10 regional states (so-called dōshūsei). The plan called for each region to have greater autonomy than existing prefectures. This process would reduce the number of subprefecture administrative regions and cut administrative costs. The Japanese government also considered a plan to merge several groups of prefectures, creating a subnational administrative division system consisting of between nine and 13 states, and giving these states more local autonomy than the prefectures currently enjoy. This plan was abandoned in 2012.

== Powers ==
Japan is a unitary state. The central government delegates many functions (such as education and the police force) to the prefectures and municipalities, but retains the overall right to control them. Although local government expenditure accounts for 70 percent of overall government expenditure, the central government controls local budgets, tax rates, and borrowing.

Prefectural government functions include the organization of the prefectural police force, the supervision of schools and the maintenance of prefectural schools (mainly high schools), prefectural hospitals, prefectural roads, the supervision of prefectural waterways and regional urban planning. Their responsibilities include tasks delegated to them by the national government such as maintaining most ordinary national roads (except in designated major cities), and prefectures coordinate and support their municipalities in their functions. De facto, prefectures as well as municipalities have often been less autonomous than the formal extent of the local autonomy law suggests, because of national funding and policies. Most of municipalities depend heavily on central government funding – a dependency recently further exacerbated in many regions by the declining population which hits rural areas harder and earlier (cities can offset it partly through migration from the countryside). In many policy areas, the basic framework is set tightly by national laws, and prefectures and municipalities are only autonomous within that framework.

== Types of prefecture ==
Historically, during the Edo period, the Tokugawa shogunate established bugyō-ruled zones (奉行支配地) around the nine largest cities in Japan, and 302 township-ruled zones (郡代支配地) elsewhere. When the Meiji government began to create the prefectural system in 1868, the nine bugyō-ruled zones became fu (府), while the township-ruled zones and the rest of the bugyō-ruled zones became ken (県). Later, in 1871, the government designated Tokyo, Osaka, and Kyoto as fu, and relegated the other fu to the status of ken. During World War II, in 1943, Tokyo became a to, a new type of pseudo-prefecture.

Despite the differences in terminology, there is little functional difference between the four types of local governments. The subnational governments are sometimes collectively referred to as todōfuken (都道府県; [todoːɸɯ̥ꜜkeɴ]) in Japanese, which is a combination of the four terms.

=== To ===
Tokyo, capital city of Japan is referred to as to (都; [toꜜ]), which is often translated as "metropolis". The Japanese government translates Tōkyō-to (東京都; [toːkʲoꜜːto]) as "Tokyo Metropolis" in almost all cases, and the government is officially called the "Tokyo Metropolitan Government".

Following the capitulation of the Tokugawa shogunate in 1868, Tōkyō-fu (an urban prefecture like Kyoto and Osaka) was set up and encompassed the former city area of Edo under the Fuhanken sanchisei. After the abolition of the han system in the first wave of prefectural mergers in 1871/72, several surrounding areas (parts of Urawa, Kosuge, Shinagawa and Hikone prefectures) were merged into Tokyo, and under the system of (numbered) "large districts and small districts" (daiku-shōku), it was subdivided into eleven large districts further subdivided into 103 small districts, six of the large districts (97 small districts) covered the former city area of Edo. When the ancient ritsuryō districts were reactivated as administrative units in 1878, Tokyo was subdivided into 15 [urban] districts (-ku) and initially six [rural] districts (-gun; nine after the Tama transfer from Kanagawa in 1893, eight after the merger of East Tama and South Toshima into Toyotama in 1896). Both urban and rural districts, like everywhere in the country, were further subdivided into urban units/towns/neighbourhoods (-chō/-machi) and rural units/villages (-mura/-son). The yet unincorporated communities on the Izu (previously part of Shizuoka) and Ogasawara (previously directly Home Ministry-administrated) island groups became also part of Tokyo in the 19th century. When the modern municipalities – [district-independent] cities and [rural] districts containing towns and villages – were introduced under the Yamagata-Mosse laws on local government and the simultaneous Great Meiji merger was performed in 1889, the 15 -ku became wards of Tokyo City, initially Tokyo's only independent city (-shi), the six rural districts of Tokyo were consolidated in 85 towns and villages. In 1893, the three Tama districts and their 91 towns and villages became part of Tokyo. As Tokyo city's suburbs grew rapidly in the early 20th century, many towns and villages in Tokyo were merged or promoted over the years. In 1932, five complete districts with their 82 towns and villages were merged into Tokyo City and organised in 20 new wards. Also, by 1940, there were two more cities in Tokyo: Hachiōji City and Tachikawa City.

In 1943, Tokyo City was abolished, Tōkyō-fu became Tōkyō-to, and Tokyo-shi's 35 wards remained Tokyo-to's 35 wards, but submunicipal authorities of Tokyo-shi's wards which previously fell directly under the municipality, with the municipality now abolished, fell directly under prefectural or now "Metropolitan" authority. All other cities, towns and villages in Tokyo-fu stayed cities, towns and villages in Tokyo-to. The reorganisation's aim was to consolidate the administration of the area around the capital by eliminating the extra level of authority in Tokyo. Also, the governor was no longer called chiji, but chōkan (~"head/chief [usually: of a central government agency]") as in Hokkaidō). The central government wanted to have greater control over all local governments due to Japan's deteriorating position in World War II – for example, all mayors in the country became appointive as in the Meiji era – and over Tokyo in particular, due to the possibility of emergency in the metropolis.

After the war, Japan was forced to decentralise Tokyo again, following the general terms of democratisation outlined in the Potsdam Declaration. Many of Tokyo's special governmental characteristics disappeared during this time, and the wards took on an increasingly municipal status in the decades following the surrender. Administratively, today's special wards are almost indistinguishable from other municipalities.

The postwar reforms also changed the map of Tokyo significantly: In 1947, the 35 wards were reorganised into the 23 special wards. In the occupation reforms, special wards, each with their own elected assemblies (kugikai) and mayors (kuchō), were intended to be equal to other municipalities even if some restrictions still applied. (For example, there was during the occupation a dedicated municipal police agency for the 23 special wards/former Tokyo City, yet the special wards public safety commission was not named by the special ward governments, but by the government of the whole "Metropolis". In 1954, independent municipal police forces were abolished generally in the whole country, and the prefectural/"Metropolitan" police of Tokyo is again responsible for the whole prefecture/"Metropolis" and like all prefectural police forces controlled by the prefectural/"Metropolitan" public safety commission whose members are appointed by the prefectural/"Metropolitan" governor and assembly.) But, as part of the "reverse course" of the 1950s some of these new rights were removed, the most obvious measure being the denial of directly elected mayors. Some of these restrictions were removed again over the decades. But it was not until the year 2000 that the special wards were fully recognised as municipal-level entities.

Independently from these steps, as Tokyo's urban growth again took up pace during the postwar economic miracle and most of the main island part of Tokyo "Metropolis" became increasingly core part of the Tokyo metropolitan area, many of the other municipalities in Tokyo have transferred some of their authority to the Metropolitan government. For example, the Tokyo Fire Department which was only responsible for the 23 special wards until 1960 has until today taken over the municipal fire departments in almost all of Tokyo. A joint governmental structure for the whole Tokyo metropolitan area (and not only the western suburbs of the special wards which are part of the Tokyo prefecture/Metropolis") as advocated by some politicians such as former Kanagawa governor Shigefumi Matsuzawa has not been established (see also Dōshūsei). Existing cross-prefectural fora of cooperation between local governments in the Tokyo metropolitan area are the Kantō regional governors' association (Kantō chihō chijikai) and the "Shutoken summit" (formally "conference of chief executives of nine prefectures and cities", 9 to-ken-shi shunō kaigi). But, these are not themselves local public entities under the local autonomy law and national or local government functions cannot be directly transferred to them, unlike the "Union of Kansai governments" (Kansai kōiki-rengō) which has been established by several prefectural governments in the Kansai region.

There are some differences in terminology between Tokyo and other prefectures: police and fire departments are called chō (庁) instead of honbu (本部), for instance. But the only functional difference between Tōkyō-to and other prefectures is that Tokyo administers wards as well as cities. Today, since the special wards have almost the same degree of independence as Japanese cities, the difference in administration between Tokyo and other prefectures is fairly minor.

In Osaka, several prominent politicians led by Tōru Hashimoto, then mayor of Osaka City and former governor of Osaka Prefecture, proposed an Osaka Metropolis plan, under which Osaka City, and possibly other neighboring cities, would be replaced by special wards similar to Tokyo's. The plan was narrowly defeated in a 2015 referendum, and again in 2020.

=== Dō ===
Hokkaidō is referred to as a dō (道; [doꜜː]) or circuit. This term was originally used to refer to Japanese regions consisting of several provinces (e.g. the Tōkaidō east-coast region, and Saikaido west-coast region). This was also a historical usage of the character in China. (In Korea, this historical usage is still used today and was kept during the period of Japanese rule.)

Hokkai-dō (北海道; [hokkaꜜidoː]), the only remaining dō today, was not one of the original seven dō (it was known as Ezo in the pre-modern era). Its current name is believed to originate from Matsuura Takeshiro, an early Japanese explorer of the island. Since Hokkaidō did not fit into the existing dō classifications, a new dō was created to cover it.

The Meiji government originally classified Hokkaidō as a "Settlement Envoyship" (開拓使, kaitakushi), and later divided the island into three prefectures (Sapporo, Hakodate, and Nemuro). These were consolidated into a single Hokkaido Department (北海道庁, Hokkaido-chō) in 1886, at prefectural level but organized more along the lines of a territory. In 1947, the department was dissolved, and Hokkaidō became a full-fledged prefecture. The -ken suffix was never added to its name, so the -dō suffix came to be understood to mean "prefecture".

When Hokkaidō was incorporated, transportation on the island was still underdeveloped, so the prefecture was split into several "subprefectures" (支庁, shichō) that could fulfill administrative duties of the prefectural government and keep tight control over the developing island. These subprefectures still exist today, although they have much less power than they possessed before and during World War II. They now exist primarily to handle paperwork and other bureaucratic functions.

"Hokkaidō Prefecture" is, technically speaking, a redundant term because dō itself indicates a prefecture, although it is occasionally used to differentiate the government from the island itself. The prefecture's government calls itself the "Hokkaidō Government" rather than the "Hokkaidō Prefectural Government".

=== Fu ===
Osaka and Kyoto Prefectures are referred to as fu (府; pronounced [ɸɯꜜ] when a separate word, but [ꜜɸɯ] when part of the full name of a prefecture, e.g. [kʲoꜜːto] and [ɸɯꜜ] become [kʲoːtoꜜɸɯ]). The Classical Chinese character from which this is derived implies a core urban zone of national importance. Before World War II, different laws applied to fu and ken, but this distinction was abolished after the war, and the two types of prefecture are now functionally the same.

=== Ken ===
43 of the 47 prefectures are referred to as ken (県; pronounced [keꜜɴ] when a separate word but [ꜜkeɴ] when part of the full name of a prefecture, e.g. [aꜜitɕi] and [keꜜɴ] become [aitɕi̥ꜜkeɴ]). The Classical Chinese character from which this is derived carries a rural or provincial connotation, and an analogous character is used to refer to the counties of China, counties of Taiwan and districts of Vietnam.

== Lists of prefectures ==
Prefectures of Japan with coloured regions

The different systems of parsing frame the ways in which Japanese prefectures are perceived:

=== By Japanese ISO ===
The prefectures are traditionally grouped into nine regions (地方, chihō). Those regions are not formally specified, they do not have elected officials, nor are they corporate bodies. This ordering is mirrored in Japan's International Organization for Standardization (ISO) coding. From north to south (numbering in ISO 3166-2:JP order), the prefectures of Japan and their commonly associated regions are:

- Hokkaidō
  1. Hokkaidō
- Tōhoku
  2. Aomori
  3. Iwate
  4. Miyagi
  5. Akita
  6. Yamagata
  7. Fukushima
- Kantō
  8. Ibaraki
  9. Tochigi
  10. Gunma
  11. Saitama
  12. Chiba
  13. Tōkyō
  14. Kanagawa
- Chūbu
  15. Niigata
  16. Toyama
  17. Ishikawa
  18. Fukui
  19. Yamanashi
  20. Nagano
  21. Gifu
  22. Shizuoka
  23. Aichi
- Kansai (Note: Also known as Kinki.)
  24. Mie
  25. Shiga
  26. Kyōto
  27. Ōsaka
  28. Hyōgo
  29. Nara
  30. Wakayama
- Chūgoku
  31. Tottori
  32. Shimane
  33. Okayama
  34. Hiroshima
  35. Yamaguchi
- Shikoku
  36. Tokushima
  37. Kagawa
  38. Ehime
  39. Kōchi
- Kyūshū
  40. Fukuoka
  41. Saga
  42. Nagasaki
  43. Kumamoto
  44. Ōita
  45. Miyazaki
  46. Kagoshima
- Okinawa
  47. Okinawa

=== By English name ===
The default alphabetic order in this sortable table can be altered to mirror the traditional Japanese regions and ISO parsing.

Prefecture		Capital		Region	Major island	Population (October census)		Population change	Area (km^{2})	Density (per km^{2})	Districts	Municipalities	ISO	Area code
Prefecture		Capital		Region	Major island	2025	2020	Population change	Area (km^{2})	Density (per km^{2})			ISO	Area code
Aichi	愛知県	Nagoya	名古屋市	Chūbu	Honshū	7,449,403	7,542,415	−1.23%	5,173.07	1,440.0	7	54	JP-23	052
Akita	秋田県	Akita	秋田市	Tōhoku	Honshū	882,100	959,502	−8.07%	11,637.52	75.8	6	25	JP-05	018
Aomori	青森県	Aomori	青森市	Tōhoku	Honshū	1,140,395	1,237,984	−7.88%	9,645.64	118.2	8	40	JP-02	017
Chiba	千葉県	Chiba	千葉市	Kantō	Honshū	6,258,512	6,284,480	−0.41%	5,157.57	1,213.5	6	54	JP-12	043
Ehime	愛媛県	Matsuyama	松山市	Shikoku	Shikoku	1,260,088	1,334,841	−5.60%	5,676.19	222.0	7	20	JP-38	089
Fukui	福井県	Fukui	福井市	Chūbu	Honshū	729,386	766,863	−4.89%	4,190.52	174.1	7	17	JP-18	077
Fukuoka	福岡県	Fukuoka	福岡市	Kyūshū	Kyūshū	5,081,879	5,135,214	−1.04%	4,986.51	1,019.1	12	60	JP-40	092
Fukushima	福島県	Fukushima	福島市	Tōhoku	Honshū	1,711,937	1,833,152	−6.61%	13,784.14	124.2	13	59	JP-07	024
Gifu	岐阜県	Gifu	岐阜市	Chūbu	Honshū	1,891,489	1,978,742	−4.41%	10,621.29	178.1	9	42	JP-21	058
Gunma	群馬県	Maebashi	前橋市	Kantō	Honshū	1,867,582	1,939,110	−3.69%	6,362.28	293.5	7	35	JP-10	027
Hiroshima	広島県	Hiroshima	広島市	Chūgoku	Honshū	2,683,399	2,799,702	−4.15%	8,479.65	316.5	5	23	JP-34	082
Hokkaido	北海道	Sapporo	札幌市	Hokkaidō	Hokkaidō	4,985,419	5,224,614	−4.58%	83,424.44	59.8	66	180	JP-01	011–016
Hyōgo	兵庫県	Kōbe	神戸市	Kansai	Honshū	5,323,825	5,465,002	−2.58%	8,401.02	633.7	8	41	JP-28	073
Ibaraki	茨城県	Mito	水戸市	Kantō	Honshū	2,791,207	2,867,009	−2.64%	6,097.39	457.8	7	44	JP-08	029
Ishikawa	石川県	Kanazawa	金沢市	Chūbu	Honshū	1,088,221	1,132,526	−3.91%	4,190.94	259.7	5	19	JP-17	076
Iwate	岩手県	Morioka	盛岡市	Tōhoku	Honshū	1,125,502	1,210,534	−7.02%	15,275.01	73.7	10	33	JP-03	019
Kagawa	香川県	Takamatsu	高松市	Shikoku	Shikoku	907,725	950,244	−4.47%	1,876.78	483.7	5	17	JP-37	087
Kagoshima	鹿児島県	Kagoshima	鹿児島市	Kyūshū	Kyūshū	1,512,969	1,588,256	−4.74%	9,187.06	164.7	8	43	JP-46	099
Kanagawa	神奈川県	Yokohama	横浜市	Kantō	Honshū	9,193,657	9,237,337	−0.47%	2,416.11	3,805.1	6	33	JP-14	045
Kōchi	高知県	Kōchi	高知市	Shikoku	Shikoku	643,437	691,527	−6.95%	7,103.63	90.6	6	34	JP-39	088
Kumamoto	熊本県	Kumamoto	熊本市	Kyūshū	Kyūshū	1,678,090	1,738,301	−3.46%	7,409.46	226.5	9	45	JP-43	096
Kyōto	京都府	Kyōto	京都市	Kansai	Honshū	2,502,747	2,578,087	−2.92%	4,612.20	542.6	6	26	JP-26	075
Mie	三重県	Tsu	津市	Kansai	Honshū	1,694,896	1,770,254	−4.26%	5,774.49	293.5	7	29	JP-24	059
Miyagi	宮城県	Sendai	仙台市	Tōhoku	Honshū	2,227,240	2,301,996	−3.25%	7,282.29	305.8	10	35	JP-04	022
Miyazaki	宮崎県	Miyazaki	宮崎市	Kyūshū	Kyūshū	1,018,904	1,069,576	−4.74%	7,735.22	131.7	6	26	JP-45	098
Nagano	長野県	Nagano	長野市	Chūbu	Honshū	1,954,950	2,048,011	−4.54%	13,561.56	144.2	14	77	JP-20	026
Nagasaki	長崎県	Nagasaki	長崎市	Kyūshū	Kyūshū	1,232,190	1,312,317	−6.11%	4,130.98	298.3	4	21	JP-42	095
Nara	奈良県	Nara	奈良市	Kansai	Honshū	1,269,180	1,324,473	−4.17%	3,690.94	343.9	7	39	JP-29	074
Niigata	新潟県	Niigata	新潟市	Chūbu	Honshū	2,068,476	2,201,272	−6.03%	12,583.96	164.4	9	30	JP-15	025
Ōita	大分県	Ōita	大分市	Kyūshū	Kyūshū	1,076,875	1,123,852	−4.18%	6,340.76	169.8	3	18	JP-44	097
Okayama	岡山県	Okayama	岡山市	Chūgoku	Honshū	1,808,664	1,888,432	−4.22%	7,114.33	254.2	10	27	JP-33	086
Okinawa	沖縄県	Naha	那覇市	Ryūkyū Islands	Ryūkyū Islands	1,468,220	1,467,480	+0.05%	2,282.59	643.2	5	41	JP-47	098
Ōsaka	大阪府	Ōsaka	大阪市	Kansai	Honshū	8,764,578	8,837,685	−0.83%	1,905.32	4,600.1	5	43	JP-27	06x
Saga	佐賀県	Saga	佐賀市	Kyūshū	Kyūshū	781,214	811,442	−3.73%	2,440.69	320.1	6	20	JP-41	095
Saitama	埼玉県	Saitama	さいたま市	Kantō	Honshū	7,287,169	7,344,765	−0.78%	3,797.75	1,918.8	8	63	JP-11	048
Shiga	滋賀県	Ōtsu	大津市	Kansai	Honshū	1,392,439	1,413,610	−1.50%	4,017.38	346.6	3	19	JP-25	077
Shimane	島根県	Matsue	松江市	Chūgoku	Honshū	629,460	671,126	−6.21%	6,707.89	93.8	5	19	JP-32	085
Shizuoka	静岡県	Shizuoka	静岡市	Chūbu	Honshū	3,468,845	3,633,202	−4.52%	7,777.35	446.0	5	35	JP-22	054
Tochigi	栃木県	Utsunomiya	宇都宮市	Kantō	Honshū	1,864,833	1,933,146	−3.53%	6,408.09	291.0	5	26	JP-09	028
Tokushima	徳島県	Tokushima	徳島市	Shikoku	Shikoku	675,489	719,559	−6.12%	4,146.75	162.9	8	24	JP-36	088
Tōkyō	東京都	Tōkyō	東京都	Kantō	Honshū	14,246,219	14,047,594	+1.41%	2,194.03	6,493.2	1	39	JP-13	03x/042
Tottori	鳥取県	Tottori	鳥取市	Chūgoku	Honshū	523,732	553,407	−5.36%	3,507.14	149.3	5	19	JP-31	085
Toyama	富山県	Toyama	富山市	Chūbu	Honshū	985,675	1,034,814	−4.75%	4,247.58	232.1	2	15	JP-16	076
Wakayama	和歌山県	Wakayama	和歌山市	Kansai	Honshū	864,262	922,584	−6.32%	4,724.65	182.9	6	30	JP-30	075
Yamagata	山形県	Yamagata	山形市	Tōhoku	Honshū	993,127	1,068,027	−7.01%	9,323.15	106.5	8	35	JP-06	023
Yamaguchi	山口県	Yamaguchi	山口市	Chūgoku	Honshū	1,264,006	1,342,059	−5.82%	6,112.54	206.8	4	19	JP-35	083
Yamanashi	山梨県	Kōfu	甲府市	Chūbu	Honshū	779,912	809,974	−3.71%	4,465.27	174.7	5	27	JP-19	055

== Former prefectures ==
=== 1880s ===
Prefecture	Japanese	Year of Abolition	Fate
Kanazawa	金沢県	1869	Renamed as Ishikawa
Sendai	仙台県	1871	Renamed as Miyagi
Morioka	盛岡県	1872	Renamed as Iwate
Nagoya	名古屋県	1872	Renamed as Aichi
Nukata	額田県	1872	Merged into Aichi
Nanao	七尾県	1872	Merged into Ishikawa and Shinkawa
Iruma	入間県	1873	Merged into Kumagaya and Kanagawa
Inba	印旛県	1873	Merged into Chiba
Kisarazu	木更津県	1873	Merged into Chiba
Utsunomiya	宇都宮県	1873	Merged into Tochigi
Asuwa	足羽県	1873	Merged into Tsuruga
Kashiwazaki	柏崎県	1873	Merged into Niigata
Ichinoseki→Mizusawa→Iwai	一関県→水沢県→磐井県	1875	Merged into Iwate and Miyagi
Okitama	置賜県	1875	Merged into Yamagata
Niihari	新治県	1875	Merged into Ibaraki and Chiba
Sakata→Tsuruoka	酒田県→鶴岡県	1876	Merged into Yamagata
Taira→Iwasaki	平県→磐前県	1876	Merged into Fukushima and Miyagi
Wakamatsu	若松県	1876	Merged into Fukushima
Chikuma	筑摩県	1876	Merged into Nagano and Gifu
Tsuruga	敦賀県	1876	Merged into Ishikawa and Shiga
Niikawa	新川県	1876	Merged into Ishikawa
Sakai	堺県	1881	Merged into Osaka
Ashigara	足柄県	1876	Merged into Kanagawa and Shizuoka
Kumagaya	熊谷県	1876	Merged into Gunma and Saitama
Aikawa	相川県	1876	Merged into Niigata
Hamamatsu	浜松県	1876	Merged into Shizuoka
Hakodate	函館県	1886	Merged into Hokkaidō
Sapporo	札幌県	1886	Merged into Hokkaidō
Nemuro	根室県	1886	Merged into Hokkaidō
Tokyo	東京府	1943	Reorganized as Tokyo Metropolis (東京都)

=== Lost after World War II ===
Various territories were lost after World War II. This does not include all the territories of the Empire of Japan such as Manchukuo.

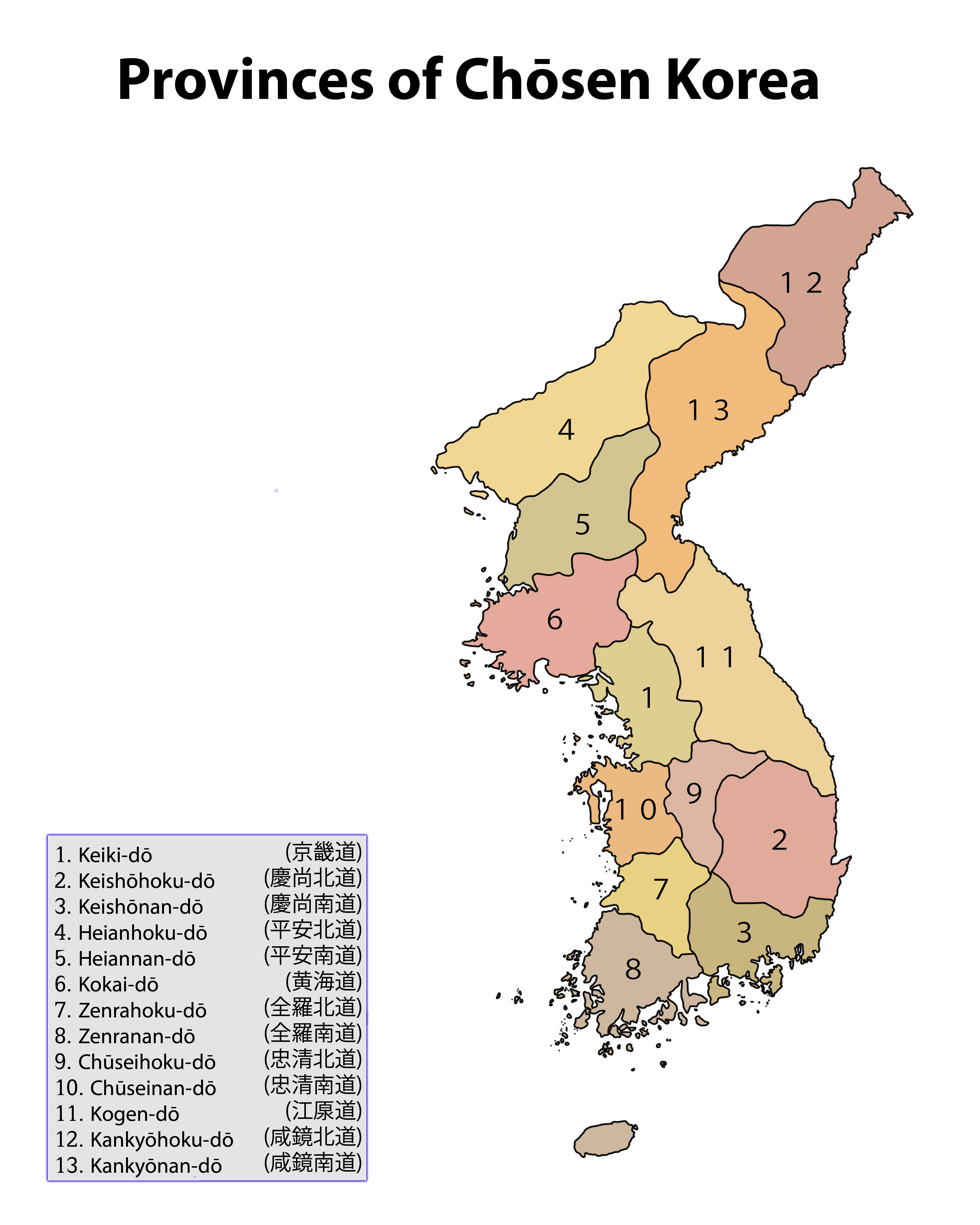
Provinces of Korea under Japanese rule. Despite being referred to as 'provinces' rather than 'prefectures', they are listed here nonetheless.

Prefectures of Taiwan under Japanese rule.

Territory	Prefecture			Allied occupation	Current status		
Territory	Name	Japanese	Capital	Allied occupation	Country	Name	Capital
Mainland	Okinawa	沖縄県	Naha	United States	Japan	Okinawa	Naha
Mainland	Karafuto	樺太庁	Toyohara	Soviet Union	Russia	part of Sakhalin	Yuzhno-Sakhalinsk
Korea	Heianhoku	平安北道	Shingishū	Soviet Union	North Korea	North Pyongan	Sinuiju
Korea	Heian'nan	平安南道	Heijō	Soviet Union	North Korea	South Pyongan	Pyongyang
Korea	Kankyōhoku	咸鏡北道	Seishin	Soviet Union	North Korea	North Hamgyong	Chongjin
Korea	Kankyōnan	咸鏡南道	Kankō	Soviet Union	North Korea	South Hamgyong	Hamhung
Korea	Kōkai	黃海道	Kaishū	Soviet Union	North Korea	Hwanghae	Haeju
Korea	Kōgen	江原道	Shunsen	Soviet Union	North Korea	Kangwon	Chuncheon
Korea	Kōgen	江原道	Shunsen	United States	South Korea	Gangwon	Chuncheon
Korea	Chūseihoku	忠清北道	Seishū	United States	South Korea	North Chungcheong	Cheongju
Korea	Chūseinan	忠清南道	Taiden	United States	South Korea	South Chungcheong	Daejeon
Korea	Keiki	京畿道	Keijō	United States	South Korea	Gyeonggi	Seoul
Korea	Keishōhoku	慶尚北道	Taikyū	United States	South Korea	North Gyeongsang	Daegu
Korea	Keishōnan	慶尚南道	Fuzan	United States	South Korea	South Gyeongsang	Busan
Korea	Zenrahoku	全羅北道	Zenshū	United States	South Korea	North Jeolla	Jeonju
Korea	Zenranan	全羅南道	Kōshū	United States	South Korea	South Jeolla	Gwangju
Taiwan (History)	Hōko	澎湖庁	Makō	Republic of China	Republic of China (Taiwan)	Penghu	Magong
Taiwan (History)	Karenkō	花蓮港庁	Karenkō	Republic of China	Republic of China (Taiwan)	Hualien	Hualien
Taiwan (History)	Shinchiku	新竹州	Shinchiku	Republic of China	Republic of China (Taiwan)	Hsinchu	Hsinchu
Taiwan (History)	Taichū	台中州	Taichū	Republic of China	Republic of China (Taiwan)	Taichung	Taichung
Taiwan (History)	Taihoku	台北州	Taihoku	Republic of China	Republic of China (Taiwan)	Greater Taipei	Taipei
Taiwan (History)	Tainan	台南州	Tainan	Republic of China	Republic of China (Taiwan)	Tainan	Tainan
Taiwan (History)	Taitō	台東庁	Taitō	Republic of China	Republic of China (Taiwan)	Taitung	Taitung
Taiwan (History)	Takao	高雄州	Takao	Republic of China	Republic of China (Taiwan)	Kaohsiung	Kaohsiung
Kantō		関東州	Dairen	Soviet Union	China	part of Dalian, Liaoning	
Nan'yō		南洋庁	Korōru	United States	Palau		Ngerulmud
Nan'yō		南洋庁	Korōru	United States	Marshall Islands		Majuro
Nan'yō		南洋庁	Korōru	United States	Federated States of Micronesia		Palikir
Nan'yō		南洋庁	Korōru	United States	United States	Northern Mariana Islands	Saipan

== See also ==
- List of Japanese prefectural name etymologies
- List of Japanese prefectures by area
- List of Japanese prefectures by population
- List of Japanese prefectures by GDP
- List of Japanese prefectures by GDP per capita
- List of Japanese prefectures by Human Development Index
- List of Japanese prefectures by life expectancy
- List of Japanese prefectures by highest mountain
- List of prefectural capitals in Japan
- List of Prefecture songs of Japan
- ISO 3166-2 codes for Japan
- List of prefectural governors in Japan
- Flags of Japanese prefectures
- Provinces of Japan

=== General ===
- List of regions of Japan
- Government of Japan
