= List of Japanese prefectures by GDP =

This is a list of Japanese prefectures by GDP. Prefectural statistics are estimates of economic activity at the prefecture level calculated in accordance with Japan's national accounts.

== Methodology ==
The article lists the GDP of Japanese prefectures in main fiscal years, where all figures are obtained from the Statistics Bureau of Japan (日本統計局). Calculating GDP of Japanese prefectures is based on Japanese yen (JP¥), for easy comparison, all the GDP figures are converted into United States dollar (US$) or Renminbi (CN¥) according to current annual average exchange rates.

Note that due to heavy changes in yen/yuan/dollar rates, nominal GDP may not reflect relative economic strength in foreign currency terms, meaning that comparisons between years and prefectures are most meaningful in the native currency, the yen.

In 2011, the yen/dollar rate is 79.8 (average), valuing Japan's nominal 2011 GDP figure of 68.1 trillion yen, at US $5.87 trillion or 37.9 trillion yuan (at 6.4588/dollar). That is less than the revised 2011 figure for China of 47.16 trillion yuan. Using May 2013 exchange rates, the yen/dollar rate is 100, valuing Japan's 2011 nominal GDP at US $4.68 trillion or 28.688 trillion yuan (at 6.13/dollar).

== 2022 list ==
List of Japanese prefectures by GDP in 2022 (in millions)
Average annual exchange rate in 2022: JPY 135.3756 per U.S. dollar
Rank	Prefecture	Region	2022 GDP (in millions of JP¥)	2022 GDP (in millions of US$)	Share of Japan GDP(%)
	Japan		595,788,788	4,401,006	100
1	Tokyo	Kanto	120,219,929	888,047	20.2
2	Osaka	Kansai	43,124,192	318,552	7.2
3	Aichi	Chuubu	43,083,104	318,249	7.2
4	Kanagawa	Kanto	35,159,372	259,717	5.9
5	Saitama	Kanto	24,665,567	182,200	4.1
6	Hyogo	Kansai	23,462,649	173,315	3.9
7	Chiba	Kanto	21,414,302	158,184	3.6
8	Hokkaido	Hokkaido	20,889,250	154,306	3.5
9	Fukuoka	Kyushu	20,187,168	149,120	3.4
10	Shizuoka	Chuubu	18,271,075	134,966	3.1
11	Ibaraki	Kanto	14,585,606	107,742	2.5
12	Hiroshima	Chugoku	12,476,116	92,159	2.1
13	Kyoto	Kansai	11,107,553	82,050	1.9
14	Gunma	Kanto	9,762,017	72,110.6	1.6
15	Miyagi	Tohoku	9,614,668	71,022.2	1.6
16	Tochigi	Kanto	9,596,238	70,886.0	1.6
17	Niigata	Chuubu	9,042,891	66,798.5	1.5
18	Nagano	Chuubu	8,918,152	65,877.1	1.5
19	Mie	Kansai	8,490,601	62,718.8	1.4
20	Gifu	Chuubu	8,225,187	60,758.3	1.4
21	Fukushima	Tohoku	7,864,963	58,097.3	1.3
22	Okayama	Chugoku	7,344,951	54,256.1	1.2
23	Shiga	Kansai	7,005,956	51,751.9	1.2
24	Kumamoto	Kyushu	6,565,053	48,495.1	1.1
25	Yamaguchi	Chugoku	6,306,247	46,583.3	1.1
26	Kagoshima	Kyushu	6,048,596	44,680.1	1.0
27	Ehime	Shikoku	5,138,119	37,954.5	0.9
28	Toyama	Chuubu	4,927,629	36,399.7	0.8
29	Oita	Kyushu	4,900,706	36,200.8	0.8
30	Iwate	Tohoku	4,797,050	35,435.1	0.8
31	Ishikawa	Chuubu	4,717,260	34,845.7	0.8
32	Nagasaki	Kyushu	4,653,614	34,375.6	0.8
33	Okinawa	Kyushu	4,461,530	32,956.7	0.7
34	Aomori	Tohoku	4,439,055	32,790.7	0.7
35	Yamagata	Tohoku	4,340,427	32,062.1	0.7
36	Wakayama	Kansai	3,996,073	29,518.4	0.7
37	Kagawa	Shikoku	3,972,232	29,342.3	0.7
38	Nara	Kansai	3,920,990	28,963.8	0.7
39	Miyazaki	Kyushu	3,766,949	27,825.9	0.6
40	Yamanashi	Chuubu	3,715,030	27,442.4	0.6
41	Akita	Tohoku	3,629,335	26,809.4	0.6
42	Fukui	Chuubu	3,494,304	25,811.9	0.6
43	Tokushima	Shikoku	3,265,795	24,123.9	0.5
44	Saga	Kyushu	3,148,889	23,260.4	0.5
45	Shimane	Chugoku	2,752,746	20,334.1	0.5
46	Kochi	Shikoku	2,407,441	17,783.4	0.4
47	Tottori	Chugoku	1,912,211	14,125.6	0.3

== 2019 list ==
List of Japanese prefectures by GDP in 2019 (in millions)
Average annual exchange rate in 2019: JPY 109.0034 per U.S. dollar
Rank	Prefecture	Region	2019 GDP (in millions of JP¥)	2019 GDP (in millions of US$)	Share of Japan GDP(%)
	Japan		580,766,947	5,327,971	100
1	Tokyo	Kanto	115,682,412	1,061,274	19.9
2	Osaka	Kansai	41,188,364	377,863	7.1
3	Aichi	Chuubu	40,910,717	375,316	7.0
4	Kanagawa	Kanto	35,205,391	322,975	6.1
5	Saitama	Kanto	23,642,796	216,900	4.1
6	Hyogo	Kansai	22,195,171	203,619	3.8
7	Chiba	Kanto	21,279,583	195,219	3.7
8	Hokkaido	Hokkaido	20,464,601	187,743	3.5
9	Fukuoka	Kyushu	19,942,412	182,952	3.4
10	Shizuoka	Chuubu	17,866,284	163,906	3.1
11	Ibaraki	Kanto	14,092,237	129,283	2.4
12	Hiroshima	Chugoku	11,969,086	109,805	2.1
13	Kyoto	Kansai	10,766,100	98,769	1.9
14	Miyagi	Tohoku	9,829,354	90,174.8	1.7
15	Gunma	Kanto	9,308,340	85,395.0	1.6
16	Tochigi	Kanto	9,261,942	84,969.3	1.6
17	Niigata	Chuubu	9,185,179	84,265.1	1.6
18	Nagano	Chuubu	8,454,339	77,560.3	1.5
19	Mie	Kansai	8,086,393	74,184.8	1.4
20	Fukushima	Tohoku	7,987,042	73,273.3	1.4
21	Gifu	Chuubu	7,936,830	72,812.7	1.4
22	Okayama	Chugoku	7,842,490	71,947.2	1.4
23	Shiga	Kansai	6,922,569	63,507.8	1.2
24	Kumamoto	Kyushu	6,363,425	58,378.2	1.1
25	Yamaguchi	Chugoku	6,350,497	58,259.6	1.1
26	Kagoshima	Kyushu	5,772,861	52,960.4	1.0
27	Ehime	Shikoku	5,148,271	47,230.4	0.9
28	Toyama	Chuubu	4,910,232	45,046.6	0.8
29	Iwate	Tohoku	4,847,594	44,472.0	0.8
30	Nagasaki	Kyushu	4,789,758	43,941.4	0.8
31	Ishikawa	Chuubu	4,779,462	43,846.9	0.8
32	Okinawa	Kyushu	4,633,329	42,506.3	0.8
33	Aomori	Tohoku	4,533,207	41,587.8	0.8
34	Oita	Kyushu	4,525,054	41,513.0	0.8
35	Yamagata	Tohoku	4,336,714	39,785.1	0.7
36	Kagawa	Shikoku	4,008,678	36,775.7	0.7
37	Nara	Kansai	3,925,192	36,009.8	0.7
38	Wakayama	Kansai	3,744,551	34,352.6	0.6
39	Miyazaki	Kyushu	3,703,950	33,980.1	0.6
40	Fukui	Chuubu	3,694,563	33,894.0	0.6
41	Akita	Tohoku	3,624,750	33,253.6	0.6
42	Yamanashi	Chuubu	3,566,046	32,715.0	0.6
43	Tokushima	Shikoku	3,222,366	29,562.1	0.6
44	Saga	Kyushu	3,219,595	29,536.7	0.6
45	Shimane	Chugoku	2,689,278	24,671.5	0.5
46	Kochi	Shikoku	2,464,567	22,610.0	0.4
47	Tottori	Chugoku	1,893,375	17,369.9	0.3

== 2014 list ==
List of Japanese prefectures by GDP in 2014 (in millions)
Prefecture	Rank	2014 GDP (in millions of JP¥)	2014 GDP (in millions of US$ PPP)	Share of Japan GDP(%)
Japan		514,296,000	4,990,640	100
Tokyo	1	94,902,100	920,914	18.453
Osaka	2	37,934,000	368,105	7.376
Aichi	3	35,990,300	349,244	6.998
Kanagawa	4	30,322,000	294,240	5.896
Saitama	5	20,914,400	202,950	4.067
Chiba	6	20,044,900	194,513	3.898
Hyogo	7	19,788,100	192,020	3.848
Hokkaido	8	18,484,600	179,372	3.594
Fukuoka	9	18,112,200	175,757	3.522
Shizuoka	10	15,442,500	149,852	3.003
Ibaraki	11	11,612,400	112,685	2.258
Hiroshima	12	11,237,900	109,051	2.185
Kyoto	13	10,053,800	97,560	1.955
Miyagi	14	8,895,850	86,324	1.730
Niigata	15	8,699,070	84,414	1.691
Tochigi	16	8,182,900	79,406	1.591
Gunma	17	8,005,480	77,684	1.557
Nagano	18	7,886,950	76,534	1.534
Mie	19	7,656,380	74,296	1.489
Fukushima	20	7,399,860	71,807	1.439
Okayama	21	7,242,770	70,289	1.408
Gifu	22	7,208,830	69,953	1.402
Yamaguchi	23	5,969,040	57,923	1.161
Shiga	24	5,845,870	56,727	1.137
Kumamoto	25	5,599,930	54,341	1.089
Kagoshima	26	5,330,340	51,725	1.036
Ehime	27	4,756,500	46,156	0.925
Iwate	28	4,647,040	45,094	0.904
Ishikawa	29	4,588,050	44,522	0.892
Toyama	30	4,452,550	43,207	0.866
Aomori	31	4,427,910	42,968	0.861
Nagasaki	32	4,310,310	41,827	0.838
Oita	33	4,142,640	40,200	0.805
Okinawa	34	4,051,060	39,311	0.788
Yamagata	35	3,754,560	36,434	0.730
Kagawa	36	3,672,270	35,635	0.714
Miyazaki	37	3,643,440	35,355	0.708
Wakayama	38	3,579,030	34,730	0.696
Nara	39	3,540,710	34,359	0.688
Akita	40	3,458,570	33,561	0.672
Fukui	41	3,129,990	30,373	0.609
Yamanashi	42	3,118,690	30,263	0.606
Tokushima	43	3,012,330	29,231	0.586
Saga	44	2,737,220	26,562	0.532
Shimane	45	2,382,270	23,117	0.463
Kochi	46	2,349,510	22,799	0.457
Tottori	47	1,779,180	17,265	0.346

== 2007 list ==
List of Japanese prefectures by GDP in 2007 (in millions)
Prefecture	Rank	2007 GDP (in millions of JP¥)	2007 GDP (in millions of US$)	2007 GDP (in millions of CN¥)	Share of Japan GDP(%)
Japan		520,249,100	4,418,122	33,624,750	100
Tokyo	1	92,300,500	783,845	5,965,570	17.742
Osaka	2	38,921,800	330,536	2,515,590	7.481
Aichi	3	37,171,900	315,676	2,402,490	7.145
Kanagawa	4	31,960,300	271,417	2,065,660	6.143
Saitama	5	21,108,100	179,257	1,364,260	4.057
Chiba	6	19,650,900	166,882	1,270,080	3.777
Hyogo	7	19,135,700	162,506	1,236,780	3.678
Fukuoka	8	18,510,900	157,200	1,196,400	3.558
Hokkaido	9	18,458,400	156,755	1,193,000	3.548
Shizuoka	10	16,927,500	143,754	1,094,060	3.254
Hiroshima	11	11,981,500	101,751	774,390	2.303
Ibaraki	12	11,577,900	98,323	748,300	2.225
Kyoto	13	10,092,700	85,710	652,310	1.940
Niigata	14	8,979,400	76,256	580,360	1.726
Miyagi	15	8,285,500	70,363	535,510	1.593
Tochigi	16	8,268,500	70,219	534,410	1.589
Mie	17	8,207,100	69,697	530,440	1.578
Nagano	18	8,147,900	69,195	526,620	1.566
Fukushima	19	7,883,400	66,948	509,520	1.515
Okayama	20	7,532,500	63,968	486,840	1.448
Gunma	21	7,498,200	63,677	484,620	1.441
Gifu	22	7,386,400	62,728	477,400	1.420
Shiga	23	6,017,100	51,099	388,900	1.157
Yamaguchi	24	5,840,300	49,598	377,470	1.123
Kumamoto	25	5,745,300	48,791	371,330	1.104
Kagoshima	26	5,464,300	46,405	353,170	1.050
Ehime	27	4,942,100	41,970	319,420	0.950
Ishikawa	28	4,709,100	39,991	304,360	0.905
Toyama	29	4,654,300	39,526	300,820	0.895
Aomori	30	4,570,200	38,812	295,380	0.878
Iwate	31	4,544,400	38,592	293,710	0.874
Oita	32	4,474,600	38,000	289,200	0.860
Nagasaki	33	4,282,200	36,366	276,770	0.823
Yamagata	34	4,208,700	35,742	272,020	0.809
Akita	35	3,808,500	32,343	246,150	0.732
Nara	36	3,749,900	31,845	242,360	0.721
Kagawa	37	3,663,700	31,113	236,790	0.704
Okinawa	38	3,662,000	31,099	236,680	0.704
Miyazaki	39	3,531,600	29,991	228,250	0.679
Wakayama	40	3,403,400	28,903	219,970	0.654
Fukui	41	3,308,100	28,093	213,810	0.636
Yamanashi	42	3,236,400	27,485	209,180	0.622
Saga	43	3,011,600	25,575	194,650	0.579
Tokushima	44	2,643,700	22,451	170,870	0.508
Shimane	45	2,506,200	21,283	161,980	0.482
Kochi	46	2,285,200	19,407	147,700	0.439
Tottori	47	1,999,200	16,978	129,210	0.384

== 2005 list ==
List of Japanese prefectures by GDP in 2005 (in millions)
Prefecture	Rank	2005 GDP (in millions of JP¥)	2005 GDP (in millions of US$)	2005 GDP (in millions of CN¥)	Share of Japan GDP(%)
Japan		513,560,700	4,659,491	38,252,060	100
Tokyo	1	91,086,300	826,418	6,784,470	17.736
Osaka	2	38,062,800	345,340	2,835,070	7.412
Aichi	3	35,756,100	324,412	2,663,260	6.962
Kanagawa	4	31,405,600	284,940	2,339,210	6.115
Saitama	5	20,855,700	189,222	1,553,420	4.061
Hokkaido	6	19,290,100	175,017	1,436,800	3.756
Hyogo	7	19,064,800	172,973	1,420,020	3.712
Chiba	8	19,006,400	172,443	1,415,670	3.701
Fukuoka	9	18,123,200	164,430	1,349,890	3.529
Shizuoka	10	16,776,400	152,211	1,249,570	3.267
Hiroshima	11	11,682,400	105,993	870,150	2.275
Ibaraki	12	10,997,000	99,775	819,100	2.141
Kyoto	13	10,012,900	90,846	745,800	1.950
Niigata	14	9,292,500	84,310	692,140	1.809
Miyagi	15	8,368,700	75,928	623,330	1.630
Tochigi	16	8,235,000	74,715	613,380	1.604
Nagano	17	8,199,300	74,392	610,720	1.597
Fukushima	18	7,819,000	70,941	582,390	1.523
Mie	19	7,761,400	70,418	578,100	1.511
Gunma	20	7,487,900	67,937	557,730	1.458
Gifu	21	7,438,600	67,490	554,060	1.448
Okayama	22	7,262,800	65,895	540,960	1.414
Shiga	23	6,026,100	54,674	448,850	1.173
Yamaguchi	24	5,846,900	53,048	435,500	1.139
Kumamoto	25	5,665,500	51,403	421,990	1.103
Kagoshima	26	5,390,600	48,908	401,510	1.050
Ehime	27	4,921,400	44,651	366,570	0.958
Toyama	28	4,779,200	43,361	355,970	0.931
Ishikawa	29	4,646,500	42,157	346,090	0.905
Iwate	30	4,530,000	41,100	337,410	0.882
Oita	31	4,459,200	40,458	332,140	0.868
Aomori	32	4,311,500	39,118	321,140	0.840
Nagasaki	33	4,305,600	39,064	320,700	0.838
Yamagata	34	4,038,000	36,636	300,770	0.786
Nara	35	3,801,800	34,493	283,170	0.740
Akita	36	3,658,100	33,190	272,470	0.712
Okinawa	37	3,618,100	32,827	269,490	0.705
Kagawa	38	3,597,400	32,639	267,950	0.700
Wakayama	39	3,517,300	31,912	261,980	0.685
Miyazaki	40	3,504,900	31,800	261,060	0.682
Fukui	41	3,336,200	30,269	248,490	0.650
Yamanashi	42	3,215,900	29,178	239,530	0.626
Saga	43	2,891,900	26,238	215,400	0.563
Tokushima	44	2,724,100	24,716	202,900	0.530
Shimane	45	2,455,200	22,276	182,870	0.478
Kochi	46	2,311,300	20,970	172,150	0.450
Tottori	47	2,022,900	18,354	150,670	0.394

== See also ==
- List of Japanese prefectures by GDP per capita
- List of Japanese prefectures by area
- List of Japanese prefectures by population

== Sources ==
- GDP(JPY) is according to Japan statistical Yearbook 2011
- Annual average exchange rates: GDP (USD), accorfding to UN Countries GDP list, US$ 1 is equal to JP¥ 107.7655 in 2000, JP¥ 110.2182 in 2005 and JP¥ 117.7535 in 2007. GDP (CNY), accorfding to China Statistical Yearbook, JP¥ 1 is equal to CN¥ 0.076864 in 2000, CN¥ 0.074484 in 2005 and CN¥ 0.064632 in 2007, see also List of Renminbi exchange rates.
