= 2020 Osaka Metropolis Plan referendum =

Osaka Metropolis Plan referendum
- 1 November 2020
- Referendum on the implementation of the Osaka Metropolis plan

Results
Choice	Votes	%
Yes	675,829	49.37%
No	692,996	50.63%
Valid votes	1,368,825	100.00%
Invalid or blank votes	0	0.00%
Total votes	1,368,825	100.00%
Registered voters/turnout	2,205,730	62.06%
- Results by wards. Yes No

A referendum on the implementation of the Osaka Metropolis Plan was held in Osaka on 1 November 2020. In the event of a "yes" vote, the wards in Osaka City would be reorganized into special wards similar to those in Tokyo. The proposal was defeated by a slim margin of 17,167 votes (1.25%).

A previous referendum on the issue in 2015 was defeated by a similar margin. Each ward's choice exactly mirrored 2015.
