= ISO 3166-2:JP =

Entry for Japan in ISO 3166-2

ISO 3166-2:JP is the entry for Japan in ISO 3166-2, part of the ISO 3166 standard published by the International Organization for Standardization (ISO), which defines codes for the names of the principal subdivisions (e.g. provinces or states) of all countries coded in ISO 3166-1.

Currently for Japan, ISO 3166-2 codes are defined for 47 prefectures.

Each code consists of two parts, separated by a hyphen. The first part is JP, the ISO 3166-1 alpha-2 code of Japan. The second part is two digits (01–47), which is the Japanese Industrial Standard JIS X 0401 code of the prefecture. The codes are assigned roughly from north to south.

== Current codes ==
Map of Japan with each prefecture labelled with the second part of its ISO 3166-2 code (with leading digit 0 omitted)

Subdivision names are listed as in the ISO 3166-2 standard published by the ISO 3166 Maintenance Agency (ISO 3166/MA).

Code	Subdivision name (ja) (ISO 3602:1989)	Subdivision name (ja) (Note: For reference only, Japanese name in kanji not included in the ISO 3166-2 standard.)	Subdivision name (en)
JP-23	Aiti	愛知県	Aichi
JP-05	Akita	秋田県	
JP-02	Aomori	青森県	
JP-38	Ehime	愛媛県	
JP-21	Gihu	岐阜県	Gifu
JP-10	Gunma	群馬県	
JP-34	Hirosima	広島県	Hiroshima
JP-01	Hokkaidô	北海道	Hokkaido
JP-18	Hukui	福井県	Fukui
JP-40	Hukuoka	福岡県	Fukuoka
JP-07	Hukusima	福島県	Fukushima
JP-28	Hyôgo	兵庫県	Hyogo
JP-08	Ibaraki	茨城県	
JP-17	Isikawa	石川県	Ishikawa
JP-03	Iwate	岩手県	
JP-37	Kagawa	香川県	
JP-46	Kagosima	鹿児島県	Kagoshima
JP-14	Kanagawa	神奈川県	
JP-39	Kôti	高知県	Kochi
JP-43	Kumamoto	熊本県	
JP-26	Kyôto	京都府	Kyoto
JP-24	Mie	三重県	
JP-04	Miyagi	宮城県	
JP-45	Miyazaki	宮崎県	
JP-20	Nagano	長野県	
JP-42	Nagasaki	長崎県	
JP-29	Nara	奈良県	
JP-15	Niigata	新潟県	
JP-44	Ôita	大分県	Oita
JP-33	Okayama	岡山県	
JP-47	Okinawa	沖縄県	
JP-27	Ôsaka	大阪府	Osaka
JP-41	Saga	佐賀県	
JP-11	Saitama	埼玉県	
JP-25	Siga	滋賀県	Shiga
JP-32	Simane	島根県	Shimane
JP-22	Sizuoka	静岡県	Shizuoka
JP-12	Tiba	千葉県	Chiba
JP-36	Tokusima	徳島県	Tokushima
JP-13	Tôkyô	東京都	Tokyo
JP-09	Totigi	栃木県	Tochigi
JP-31	Tottori	鳥取県	
JP-16	Toyama	富山県	
JP-30	Wakayama	和歌山県	
JP-06	Yamagata	山形県	
JP-35	Yamaguti	山口県	Yamaguchi
JP-19	Yamanasi	山梨県	Yamanashi

== See also ==
- Administrative divisions of Japan
- FIPS region codes of Japan
