= Chukyo Metropolis proposal =

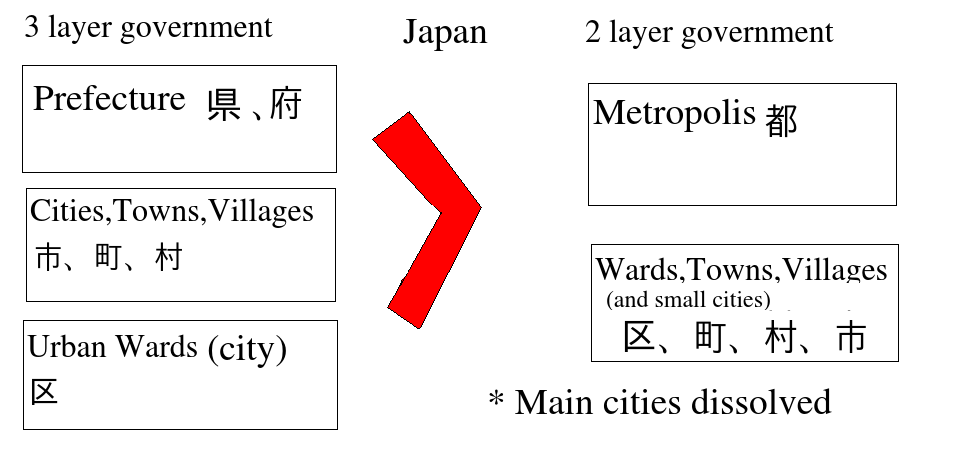
The above figure explains the generic process of Metropolis creation in Japan, a model which has extensive basis in East Asian administrative history.

The Chukyo Metropolis proposals (中京都構想 and ja:岐阜愛知新首都構想) are proposed transformations of the Aichi prefecture into a metropolis. Aichi's prefectural governor, Hideaki Omura, formed the Chukyo Isshin no Kai (ja:中京維新の会) or Chukyo Metropolitan Area Renewal Association in 2012. The latter plan is an alternate that also incorporates Gifu prefecture in the Metropolis.

The metropolis would require Nagoya city to be dissolved and reorganized into wards under metropolitan authority. The concept has parallels with Tokyo's past and Osaka's proposed reorganization.

== See also ==
- Greater Nagoya Initiative
- Dōshūsei
