= Osaka Metropolis Plan =

Proposed metropolitan plan

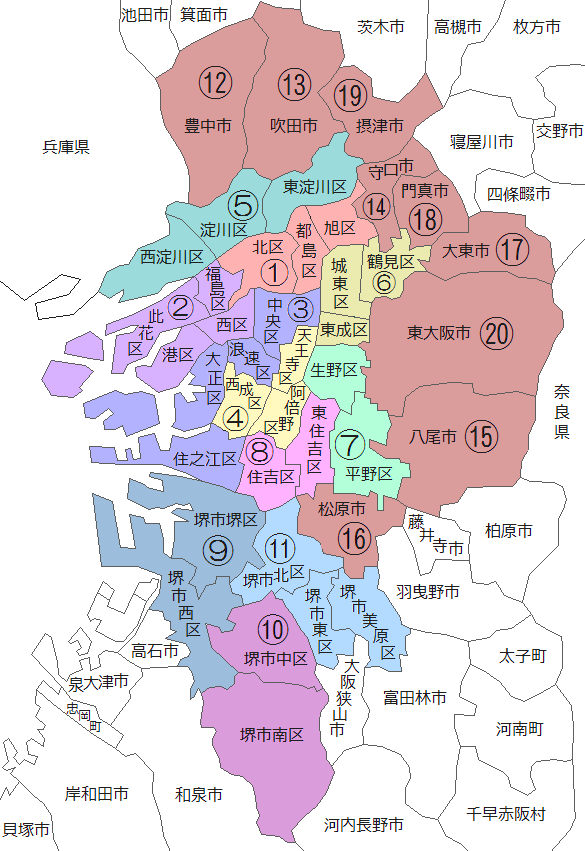
One possible reorganization of central Osaka Prefecture into 20 special wards, as proposed by the Restoration Association in 2010. Wards (1) through (8) cover the current territory of Osaka City, wards (9) through (11) cover the current territory of Sakai City, and wards (12) through (20) correspond to other existing municipalities in Osaka Prefecture.

The Osaka Metropolis Plan (Japanese: 大阪都構想, Hepburn: Ōsaka-to kōsō) or Osaka Metropolis is a proposal to transform Osaka Prefecture from a fu, an urban prefecture, into a to, a metropolis. Under the initially envisioned plan, Osaka city, Sakai city, and other surrounding cities in Osaka prefecture, were to be dissolved and – similarly to the special wards of Tokyo – subdivided into special wards which had a status as municipalities but left some municipal tasks and revenues to the prefectural administration. As political resistance grew, notably the opposition to the plan in Sakai City expressed in the 2013 mayoral election, the concrete plan was reduced to, at least as a first step, only abolishing Osaka City. As in Tokyo, the metropolis would have continued to include all other municipalities of the prefecture and served as a prefectural government for them.

The plan was defeated by a slim margin of 0.76% in the 2015 Osaka Metropolis Plan referendum in Osaka City.

After the April 2019 unified local elections and the June 2019 Sakai City mayoral election, the ORA regained the governorship and a majority in the assembly, the mayorships of Osaka City and Sakai City, and strong pluralities in both city assemblies. Other parties have indicated to allow for a second metropolis plan referendum.

On 1 November 2020, a second referendum to merge Osaka's 24 wards into 4 semi-autonomous wards was narrowly voted down. There were 692,996 (50.6%) votes against and 675,829 (49.4%) votes supported it. Osaka mayor and Osaka Ishin co-leader Ichiro Matsui said he would retire when his term ended in 2023.

A bid for a potential third referendum was announced in January 2026. A bill was drafted by members of the Osaka Restoration Association on March 31. After the July 2026 passage of the bill to create an alternate capital city, Hirofumi Yoshimura, the leader of Ishin and the governor of Osaka, stated that the Metropolis Plan should be voted on simultaneously.

== Proponents ==
The plan was a main goal of the Osaka Restoration Association, a political party led by former Osaka governor and then-Osaka City mayor Tōru Hashimoto, as well as Japan Innovation Party, its national spin-off. The party currently includes the governor of Osaka Prefecture, the mayor of Osaka City, a majority in the Osaka Prefectural Assembly and a majority of seats in the Osaka City Council.

== Proposals ==
Under the Association's plan, the 24 wards of Osaka, seven wards of Sakai, and nine other municipalities in Osaka Prefecture would be reorganized into twenty special wards, each having municipal status similar to the special wards of Tokyo. As is the case in Tokyo, the prefectural government would be responsible for collecting fixed asset taxes and regional corporate taxes within this area, and would provide water, fire protection, public transit and other services through a unified administration for all 20 wards, while resident services and other administrative tasks would be handled by the wards themselves.

In July 2012, seven established parties in the National Diet (DPJ, LDP, Komeito, PNP, LF, Minna no To, Kizuna) and the Kaikaku-Mushozoku no Kai House of Representatives parliamentary group jointly submitted a bill that would create the legal framework to allow Ōsaka and Sakai cities to be split into special wards; the name change of Osaka prefecture from Osaka-fu to Osaka-to is not included, reserving the to designation for the prefecture of Tokyo. The law would also allow other major cities and their surrounding municipalities to reorganize as special wards and transfer municipal tasks to the prefectural government. Condition for application is an agglomeration population of 2 million and the agreement of all participating municipalities (by assembly vote and referendum) and the prefecture involved. Namely this would give the cities of Sapporo, Saitama, Chiba, Yokohama and Kawasaki, Nagoya, Kyoto, and Kobe the option to dissolve and transform Hokkaido, Saitama, Chiba, Kanagawa, Aichi, Kyoto or Hyōgo into "metropolises" like Tokyo. The bill was passed by the Diet in August 2012.

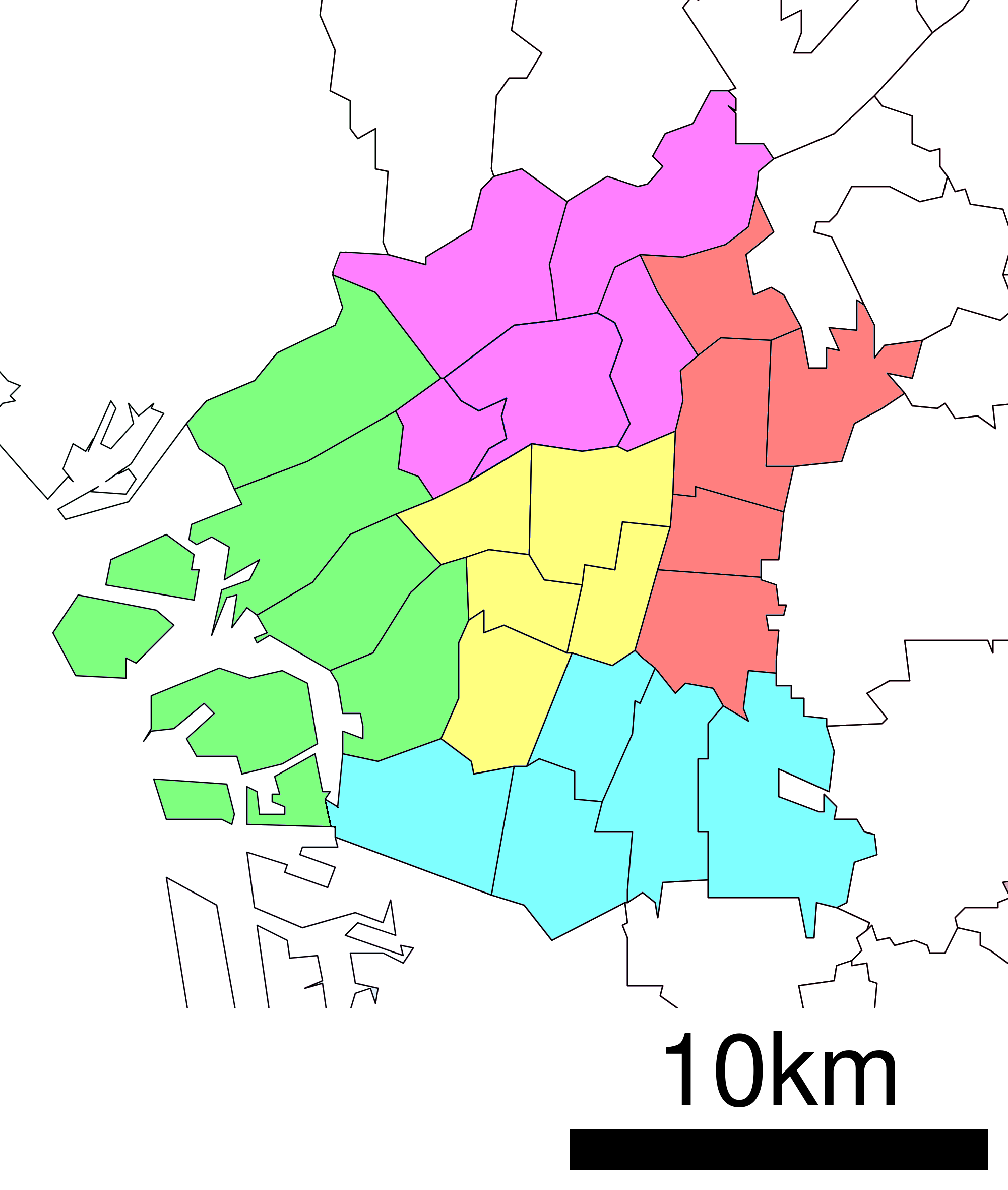
Final plan used in the referendum.

Four plans of special wards divided from Osaka City, as proposed by the project team in 2012:
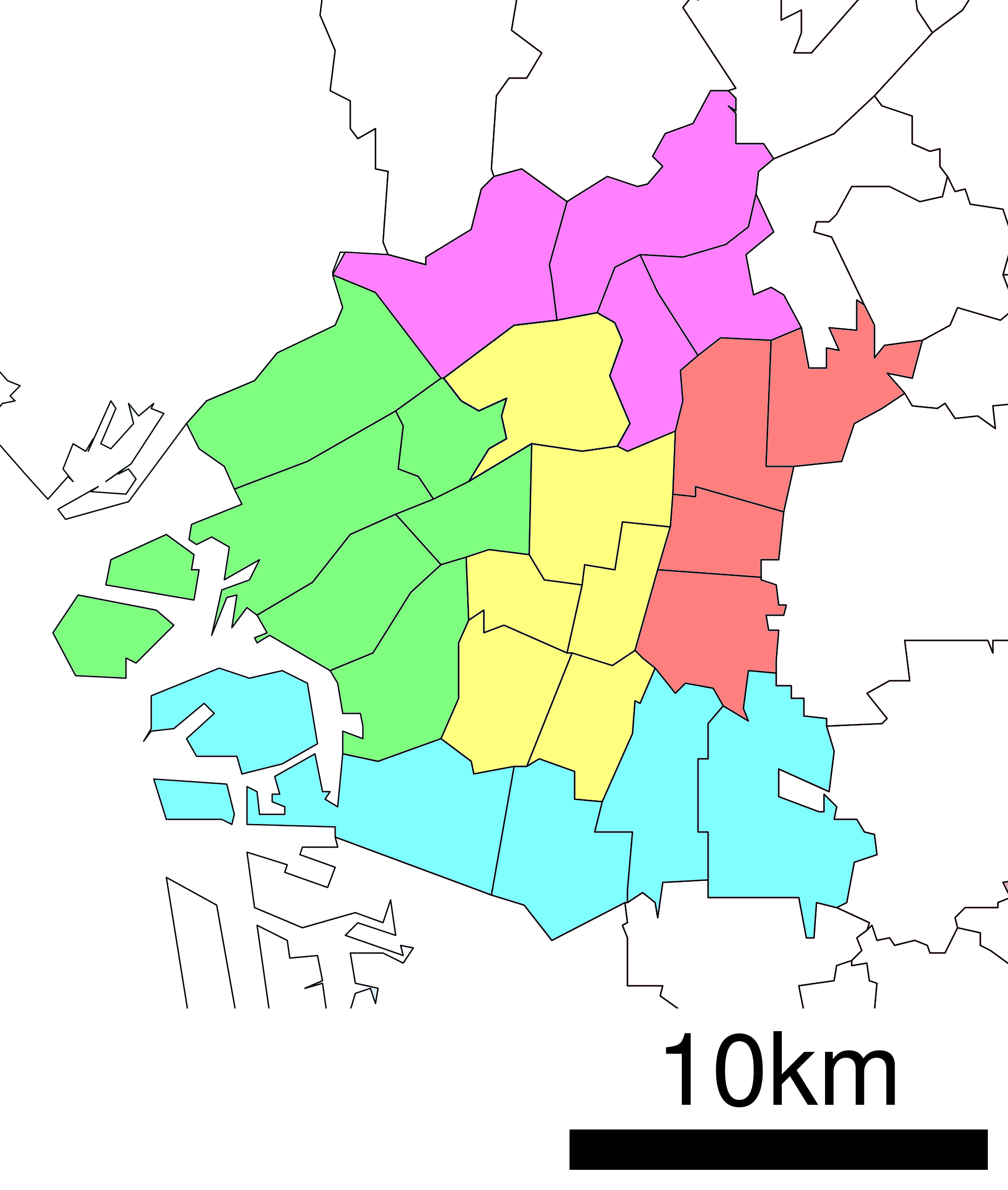
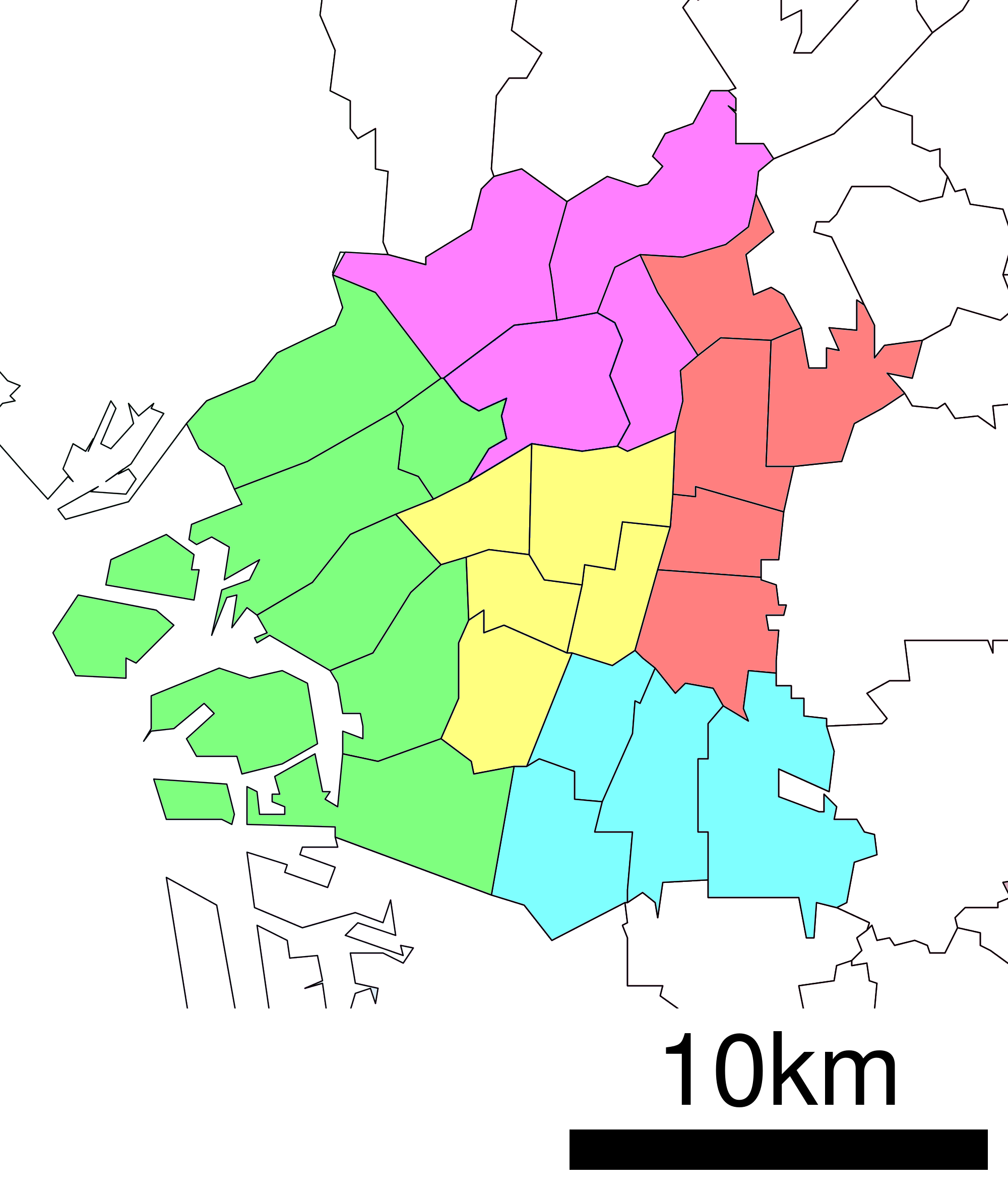
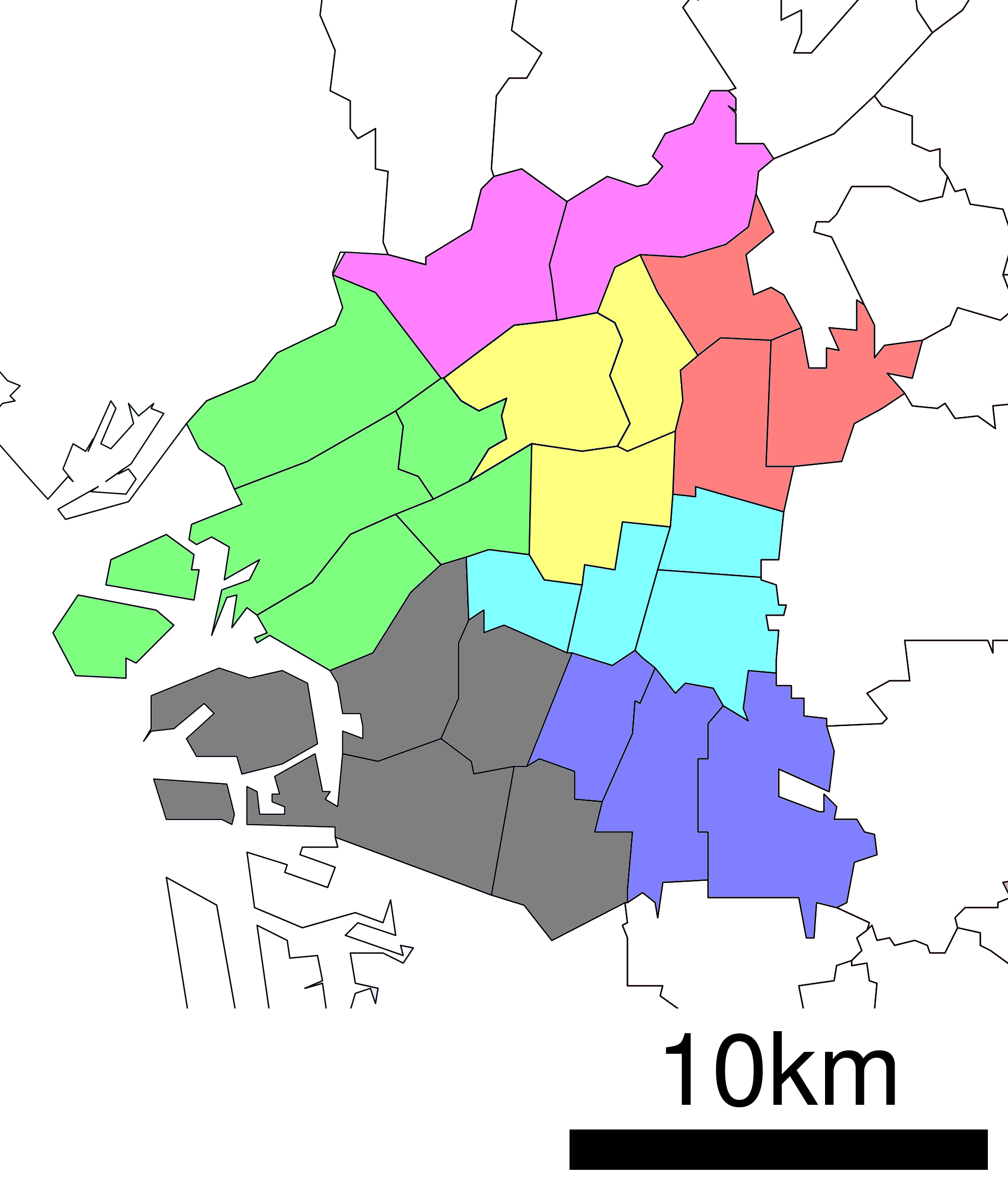
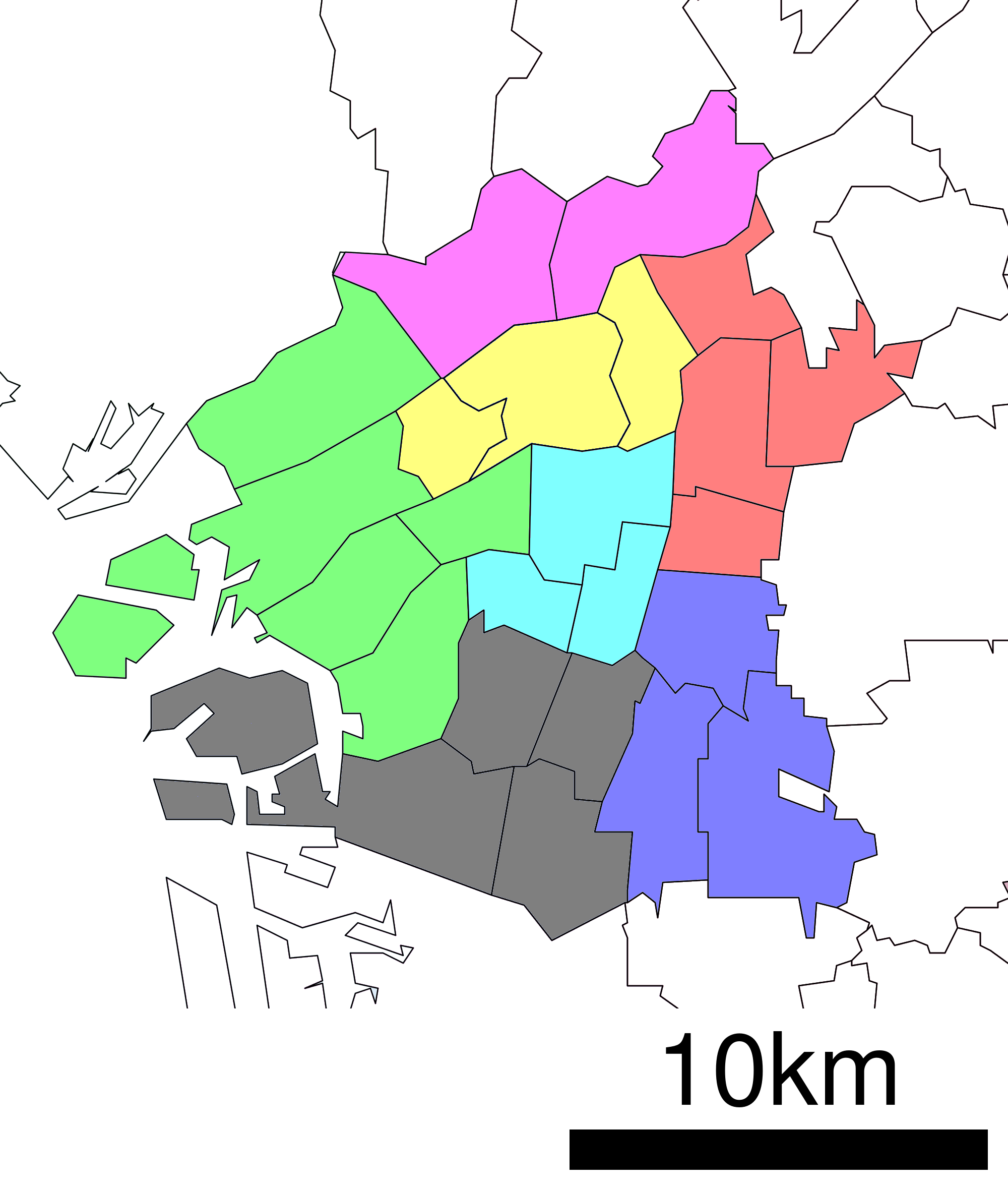

== Effects ==
Despite Osaka setting a nationwide precedent for putting to public vote a metropolitan plan with a 'no' result, Osaka and other cities had continued to create such plans. As of 2017, the Yokohama city council strongly supported transforming into a special city – essentially: a prefecture-independent city – to eliminate duplication of services with the prefecture. As of 2015, Nagoya was still debating its own metropolitan plan and said that the Osaka referendum had no impact as its plans were not the same.

== See also ==
- Chukyo Metropolis proposal
