= 2015 Osaka Metropolis Plan referendum =

2015 referendum in Osaka and surrounding cities, Japan

Osaka Metropolis Plan referendum
- 17 May 2015
- Referendum on the implementation of the Osaka Metropolis plan

Results
| Choice | Votes | % |
|---|---|---|
| Yes | 694,844 | 49.62% |
| No | 705,585 | 50.38% |
| Valid votes | 1,400,429 | 99.60% |
| Invalid or blank votes | 5,655 | 0.40% |
| Total votes | 1,406,084 | 100.00% |
| Registered voters/turnout | 2,104,076 | 66.83% |
- Result by ward. Yes No

A referendum on the implementation of the Osaka Metropolis Plan was held in Osaka on 17 May 2015. In the event of a "yes" vote, the wards in Osaka City would be reorganized into special wards similar to those in Tokyo. The proposal was defeated by a slim margin of 10,741 votes (0.76%).

A rerun referendum in 2020 was defeated by a similar margin.

== Results ==
50.4% voted against the proposal. 13 out of 24 Osaka wards voted "no".

Interest on the referendum was particularly high. The turnout of 66.83% is 5.91% higher than the turnout in the 2011 mayoral and gubernatorial election.

=== Totals ===
| Choice | Votes | % |
|---|---|---|
| For | 694,844 | 49.62 |
| Against | 705,585 | 50.38 |
| Total | 1,400,429 | 100.00 |
| Valid votes | 1,400,429 | 99.60 |
| Invalid/blank votes | 5,655 | 0.40 |
| Total votes | 1,406,084 | 100.00 |
| Registered voters/turnout | 2,104,076 | 66.83 |
Source: Osaka City Electoral Commission

=== By wards ===
| Ward | Electorate | Votes for | Votes against | For(%) | Against(%) | Valid votes | Invalid votes | Total | Turnout(%) | Proposed special ward |
|---|---|---|---|---|---|---|---|---|---|---|
| Kita-ku | 94,128 | 36,019 | 25,001 | 59.0% | 41.0% | 61,020 | 228 | 61,248 | 65.1% | Kita-ku |
| Miyakojima-ku | 82,237 | 30,135 | 26,671 | 53.0% | 47.0% | 56,806 | 205 | 57,011 | 69.3% | Kita-ku |
| Fukushima-ku | 56,798 | 21,586 | 17,267 | 55.6% | 44.4% | 38,853 | 131 | 38,984 | 68.6% | Kita-ku |
| Konohana-ku | 54,470 | 17,597 | 18,872 | 48.3% | 51.7% | 36,469 | 137 | 36,606 | 67.2% | Wangan-ku |
| Chūō-ku | 71,819 | 24,336 | 20,657 | 54.1% | 45.9% | 44,993 | 164 | 45,157 | 62.9% | Chūō-ku |
| Nishi-ku | 70,287 | 26,094 | 19,160 | 57.7% | 42.3% | 45,254 | 162 | 45,416 | 64.6% | Chūō-ku |
| Minato-ku | 66,673 | 21,410 | 23,351 | 47.8% | 52.2% | 44,761 | 172 | 44,933 | 67.4% | Wangan-ku |
| Taishō-ku | 55,159 | 16,646 | 21,211 | 44.0% | 56.0% | 37,857 | 131 | 37,988 | 68.9% | Wangan-ku |
| Tennōji-ku | 54,774 | 18,327 | 20,815 | 46.8% | 53.2% | 39,142 | 174 | 39,316 | 71.8% | Chūō-ku |
| Naniwa-ku | 48,936 | 13,563 | 12,189 | 52.7% | 47.3% | 25,752 | 98 | 25,850 | 52.8% | Chūō-ku |
| Nishiyodogawa-ku | 75,827 | 23,670 | 28,337 | 45.5% | 54.5% | 52,007 | 179 | 52,186 | 68.8% | Wangan-ku |
| Yodogawa-ku | 138,515 | 48,566 | 38,903 | 55.5% | 44.5% | 87,469 | 379 | 87,848 | 63.4% | Kita-ku |
| Higashiyodogawa-ku | 136,353 | 43,388 | 41,340 | 51.2% | 48.8% | 84,728 | 336 | 85,064 | 62.4% | Kita-ku |
| Higashinari-ku | 61,085 | 20,689 | 20,667 | 50.0% | 50.0% | 41,356 | 194 | 41,550 | 68.0% | Higashi-ku |
| Ikuno-ku | 83,886 | 25,396 | 29,190 | 46.5% | 53.5% | 54,586 | 236 | 54,822 | 65.4% | Higashi-ku |
| Asahi-ku | 74,371 | 23,145 | 28,048 | 45.2% | 54.8% | 51,193 | 209 | 51,402 | 69.1% | Higashi-ku |
| Jōtō-ku | 132,091 | 46,728 | 45,784 | 50.5% | 49.5% | 92,512 | 338 | 92,850 | 70.3% | Higashi-ku |
| Tsurumi-ku | 85,852 | 29,859 | 29,752 | 50.1% | 49.9% | 59,611 | 222 | 59,833 | 69.7% | Higashi-ku |
| Abeno-ku | 85,354 | 30,434 | 32,446 | 48.4% | 51.6% | 62,880 | 254 | 63,134 | 74.0% | Minami-ku |
| Suminoe-ku | 100,867 | 33,184 | 36,880 | 47.4% | 52.6% | 70,064 | 250 | 70,314 | 69.7% | Minami-ku/Wangan-ku |
| Sumiyoshi-ku | 123,549 | 38,623 | 45,950 | 45.7% | 54.3% | 84,573 | 373 | 84,946 | 68.8% | Minami-ku |
| Higashisumiyoshi-ku | 105,456 | 34,079 | 37,322 | 47.7% | 52.3% | 71,401 | 363 | 71,764 | 68.1% | Minami-ku |
| Hirano-ku | 155,527 | 46,072 | 56,959 | 44.7% | 55.3% | 103,031 | 487 | 103,518 | 66.6% | Minami-ku |
| Nishinari-ku | 90,062 | 25,298 | 28,813 | 46.8% | 53.2% | 54,111 | 233 | 54,344 | 60.3% | Chūō-ku |
| Osaka City | 2,104,076 | 694,844 | 705,585 | 49.62% | 50.38% | 1,400,429 | 5,655 | 1,406,084 | 66.83% | |

== Reactions to the result ==
After the defeat of the plan he had championed in the previous five years, Osaka Mayor Toru Hashimoto announced that he would retire from politics once his term expired in December 2015. A major shakeup also occurred in Hashimoto's Japan Innovation Party, with the leader Kenji Eda and secretary-general Yorihisa Matsuno both announcing their resignation from their posts after the defeat.

The referendum outcome was perceived as a blow to Prime Minister Shinzo Abe, who had supported the plan despite opposition from the Osaka branch of his Liberal Democratic Party, hoping that the Innovation Party would in turn support his efforts to amend the Constitution.
