= List of Japanese prefectures by GDP per capita =

This is a list of Japanese prefectures by GDP per capita.

== List of prefectures by GDP per capita ==
Prefectures by GDP per capita in 2021 according to data by the OECD.

Rank	Prefecture	2021 GDP per capita in JP¥	2021 GDP per capita in US$ (PPP)
1	Tokyo	7 766 347	78 694
2	Aichi	5 167 492	52 361
3	Ibaraki	4 879 071	49 438
4	Shiga	4 655 665	47 174
5	Shizuoka	4 650 280	47 120
6	Tochigi	4 573 224	46 339
7	Fukui	4 636 185	46 977
8	Mie	4 635 603	46 971
9	Toyama	4 557 627	46 181
10	Gunma	4 540 022	46 003
11	Yamaguchi	4 494 653	45 543
12	Osaka	4 490 904	45 505
13	Tokushima	4 489 923	45 495
-	Japan	4 402 959	44 614
14	Yamanashi	4 402 396	44 608
15	Hiroshima	4 175 368	42 308
16	Fukushima	4 143 509	41 985
17	Kyoto	4 075 437	41 295
18	Nagano	4 060 091	41 140
19	Miyagi	4 032 942	40 865
20	Oita	4 024 107	40 775
21	Ishikawa	3 981 512	40 343
22	Hyogo	3 965 450	40 181
23	Niigata	3 945 045	39 974
24	Wakayama	3 942 511	39 948
25	Kagawa	3 925 639	39 777
26	Gifu	3 909 815	39 617
27	Okayama	3 904 180	39 560
28	Yamagata	3 885 042	39 366
29	Shimane	3 843 703	38 947
30	Hokkaido	3 793 036	38 434
31	Saga	3 775 119	38 252
32	Iwate	3 762 230	38 122
33	Ehime	3 687 715	37 366
34	Kanagawa	3 656 692	37 052
35	Fukuoka	3 634 274	36 825
36	Kagoshima	3 596 016	36 437
37	Akita	3 590 63	36 383
38	Kumamoto	3 554 347	36 015
39	Aomori	3 499 582	35 460
40	Nagasaki	3 409 705	34 550
41	Tottori	3 358 216	34 028
42	Miyazaki	3 343 478	33 878
43	Kochi	3 325 214	33 693
44	Chiba	3 173 539	32 157
45	Saitama	3 094 684	31 358
46	Okinawa	2 851 622	28 895
47	Nara	2 741 738	27 781
