= Special wards of Tokyo =

Special form of municipalities in Honshu, Japan

Special wards of Tokyo 東京特別区
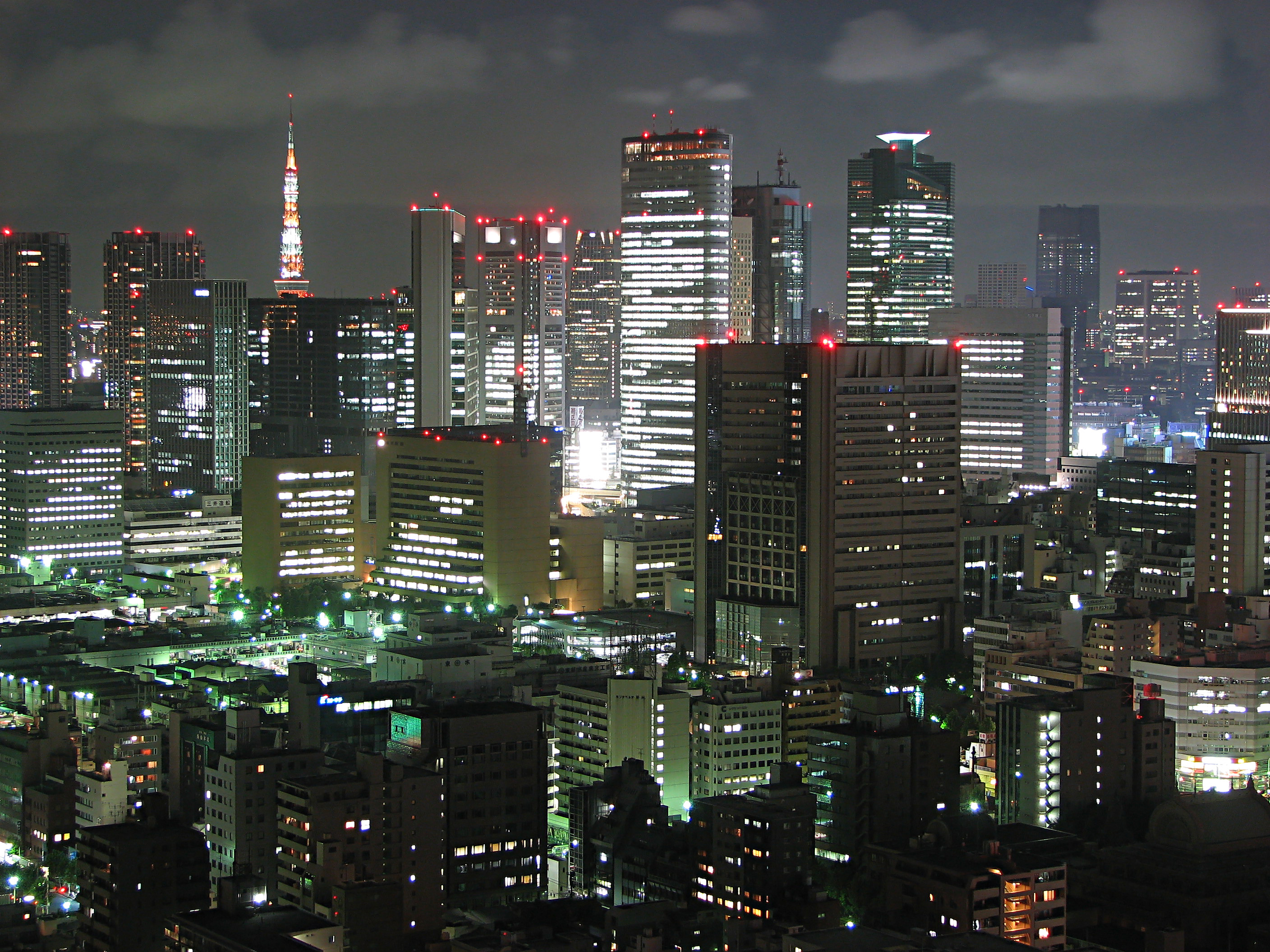
- Minato, one of Tokyo's special wards

- Map of Tokyo with special wards in green
- Country: Japan
- Island: Honshu
- Region: Kantō
- Prefecture: Tokyo

Area
  - Special wards: 627.51 km^{2} (242.28 sq mi)

Population (January 1, 2024)
  - Special wards: 9,878,284
  - Density: 15,742/km^{2} (40,770/sq mi)

Location of each ward in Tokyo's ward area (Click to view article) /

The 23 special wards (特別区, tokubetsu-ku) of Tokyo are a unique form of municipality under Japan's 1947 Local Autonomy Law. They are city-level wards: primary subdivisions of a prefecture with municipal autonomy. Together, they cover 627 km^{2} (242 sq mi) and, as of 2024, house roughly 9.8 million residents, yielding a density of about 15,742 people/km^{2} (40,770 people/mi^{2}). Similar ward systems are legally possible in other prefectures, but none have been established.

Tokyo's 23 special wards unite with 39 ordinary municipalities (cities, towns and villages) to their west to form the Tokyo Metropolitan Prefecture. Without the ordinary municipalities, the special wards account for what was the core Tokyo City, before it was abolished in 1943 under the Tōjō Cabinet. It was four years later, during the Occupation of Japan, that autonomy was restored to Tokyo City by means of the special wards, each being given a directly elected mayor and assembly like all other cities, towns and villages in Japan.

In Japanese the 23 are collectively also known as Wards Area of Tokyo Metropolis (東京都区部, Tōkyō-to kubu), Wards Area (区部, kubu), former Tokyo City (旧東京市, kyū-Tōkyō-shi), or less formally the 23 wards (23区, nijūsan-ku) or just Tokyo (東京, Tōkyō) if the context makes obvious that this does not refer to the whole prefecture. Most of Tokyo's prominent infrastructure is located within the special wards. Today, the translation of the Japanese suffix -ku varies: while the word ku (区) means ward, some local ward governments officially translate -ku as city in English (e.g., Shinjuku City), maps, road signs, and official documents also frequently use ward or leave the suffix untranslated as -ku. In Japanese law, their official designation remains unchanged as special ward (特別区, tokubetsu-ku). They are a group of 23 municipalities that do not share a single municipal government separate from the Tokyo Metropolitan Government, which governs all 62 municipalities across the broader metropolis. Unlike standard cities (市, -shi) in the metropolis, in special wards (区, -ku) certain city-level services like water, sewage, and fire protection are managed centrally by the metropolis for the whole Wards Area rather than by each special ward individually. Certain local taxes are also collected centrally by the metropolitan government to finance these shared services and balance municipal funding across all 23 wards.

== Analogues in other countries ==
Analogues exist in historic and contemporary Chinese and Korean administration: "Special wards" are city-independent wards, analogously, "special cities/special cities" (teukbyeol-si/tokubetsu-shi) are province-/prefecture-independent cities and were intended to be introduced under SCAP in Japan, too; but in Japan, implementation was stalled, and in 1956 special cities were replaced in the Local Autonomy Law with designated major cities which gain additional autonomy, but remain part of prefectures. In everyday English, Tokyo as a whole is also referred to as a city even though it contains 62 cities, towns, villages and special wards. The closest English equivalents for the special wards would be the London boroughs or New York City boroughs if Greater London and New York City had been abolished in the same way as Tokyo City, making the boroughs top-level divisions of England or New York state.

== Differences from other municipalities ==
Although the special wards are autonomous from the Tokyo metropolitan government, they also function as a single urban entity in respect to certain public services, including water supply, sewage disposal, and fire services. These services are handled by the Tokyo metropolitan government, whereas cities would normally provide these services themselves. This situation is very similar to Brazil's Federal District and its 35 administrative regions, but with local elections. To finance the joint public services it provides to the 23 wards, the metropolitan government levies some of the taxes that would normally be levied by city governments, and also makes transfer payments to wards that cannot finance their own local administration.

Waste disposal is handled by each ward under direction of the metropolitan government. For example, plastics were generally handled as non-burnable waste until the metropolitan government announced a plan to halt burying of plastic waste by 2010; as a result, about half of the special wards now treat plastics as burnable waste, while the other half mandate recycling of either all or some plastics.

Unlike cities and other municipalities (including the municipalities of western Tokyo), special wards were initially not considered to be local public entities for purposes of the Constitution of Japan. This means that they had no constitutional right to pass their own legislation, or to hold direct elections for mayors and councilors. While these authorities were granted by statute during the US-led occupation and again in 1975, they could be unilaterally revoked by the National Diet; similar measures against other municipalities would require a constitutional amendment. The denial of elected mayors to the special wards was reaffirmed by the Supreme Court in the 1963 decision Japan v. Kobayashi et al. (also known as Tokyo Ward Autonomy Case).

In 1998, the National Diet passed a revision of the Local Autonomy Law (effective in the year 2000) that implemented the conclusions of the Final Report on the Tokyo Ward System Reform increasing their fiscal autonomy and established the wards as basic local public entities.

== History ==
In Japanese legal terminology, the word special (特別, tokubetsu) distinguishes Tokyo's 23 wards from the ordinary administrative wards (区, ku) of other designated cities, which are non-autonomous subdivisions without elected councils or mayors. Before 1943, however, the wards of Tokyo City held no unique legal status and were identical to those in Osaka or Kyoto.

When the modern municipal code was implemented in 1889, Tokyo City initially comprised 15 wards. In October 1932, the city absorbed 82 surrounding towns and villages across five districts (Ebara, Toyotama, Kita-Toshima, Minami-Adachi, and Minami-Katsushika), organizing them into 20 new wards to create a 35-ward structure popularly known as Daitokyo (大東京, Dai-Tōkyō). Further minor annexations, including the 1936 incorporation of Kinuta and Chitose villages into Setagaya Ward, expanded Tokyo City to the geographic boundary that defines the Wards Area today.

=== 1943–1947 ===
On March 15, 1943, as part of a wartime centralization of administrative authority, the Diet enacted the Tokyo Metropolitan Administration Act under the Tōjō cabinet, which took effect on July 1, 1943, merging Tokyo City (東京市, Tōkyō-shi) and Tokyo Urban Prefecture (東京府, Tōkyō-fu) into Tokyo Metropolis (東京都, Tōkyō-to). This abolished the municipal governance of Tokyo City (including its elected mayor and city council) and placed the 35 wards area under the direct control of a governor appointed by the Home Ministry.

=== 1947–2000 ===
The 35 wards of the former city were integrated into 22 on March 15, 1947, just before the legal definition of special wards was given by the Local Autonomy Law, enforced on May 3 the same year. The 23rd ward, Nerima, was formed on August 1, 1947, when Itabashi was split again. The postwar reorganization under the US-led occupation authorities democratized the prefectural administrations but did not include the reinstitution of Tokyo City. Seiichirō Yasui, a former Home Ministry bureaucrat and appointed governor, won the first Tokyo gubernatorial election against Daikichirō Tagawa, a former Christian Socialist member of the Imperial Diet, former vice mayor of Tokyo city and advocate of Tokyo city's local autonomy.

Since the 1970s, the special wards of Tokyo have exercised a considerably higher degree of autonomy than the administrative wards of cities (that unlike Tokyo City retained their elected mayors and assemblies) but still less than other municipalities in Tokyo or the rest of the country, making them less independent than cities, towns or villages, but more independent than city subdivisions. Today, each special ward has its own elected mayor (区長, kuchō) and assembly (区議会, kugikai).

=== 2000–present ===
In 2000, the National Diet designated the special wards as local public entities (地方公共団体, chihō kōkyō dantai), giving them a legal status similar to cities.

The wards vary greatly in area (from 10 to 60 km^{2} (3.9 to 23.2 sq mi)) and population (from less than 40,000 to 830,000), and some are expanding as artificial islands are built. Setagaya has the most people, while neighboring Ōta has the largest area.

The total population census of the 23 special wards had fallen under 8 million as the postwar economic boom moved people out to suburbs, and then rose as Japan's lengthy stagnation took its toll and property values drastically changed, making residential inner areas up to 10 times less costly than during peak values. Its population was 8,949,447 as of October 1, 2010, about two-thirds of the population of Tokyo and a quarter of the population of the Greater Tokyo Area.

The Mori Memorial Foundation put forth a proposal in 1999 to consolidate the 23 wards into six larger cities for efficiency purposes, and an agreement was reached between the metropolitan and special ward governments in 2006 to consider realignment of the wards, but there has been minimal further movement to change the current special ward system.

== Demographics ==
Historical population
Year	Pop.	±%
1920	3,358,186	—
1930	4,986,913	+48.5%
1940	6,778,804	+35.9%
1945	2,777,010	−59.0%
1950	5,385,071	+93.9%
1960	8,310,027	+54.3%
1970	8,840,942	+6.4%
1980	8,351,893	−5.5%
1990	8,163,573	−2.3%
2000	8,134,688	−0.4%
2010	8,945,695	+10.0%
2020	9,733,276	+8.8%
Source: Censuses (Note: For years prior to 1950, figures cover the area of present-day Special wards of Tokyo.)

== In other prefectures ==
Special wards do not currently exist outside Tokyo; however, several Osaka area politicians, led by Governor Tōru Hashimoto, are backing an Osaka Metropolis plan under which the city of Osaka would be replaced by special wards, consolidating many government functions at the prefectural level and devolving other functions to more localized governments. Under a new 2012 law, – sometimes informally called "Osaka Metropolis plan law", but not specifically referring to Osaka – major cities and their surrounding municipalities in prefectures other than Tokyo may be replaced with special wards with similar functions if approved by the involved municipal and prefectural governments and ultimately the citizens of the dissolving municipalities in a referendum. Prerequisite is a population of at least 2 million in the dissolving municipalities; three cities (Yokohama, Nagoya and Osaka) meet this requirement on their own, seven other major city areas can set up special wards if a designated city is joined by neighboring municipalities. However, prefectures (道府県, -dō/-fu/-ken) where special wards are set up cannot style themselves metropolis (都, -to) as the Local Autonomy Law only allows Tokyo with that status. In Osaka, a 2015 referendum to replace the city with five special wards was defeated narrowly.

Postwar local government structure of Japan
Level	Executive	Executive leadership	Legislature
State/nation (kuni, 国); Unitary state, local autonomy anchored in the Constitution	Central/Japanese national government (chūō-/Nihonkoku-seifu, 中央/日本国政府)	Cabinet/Prime Minister (naikaku/naikaku sōri-daijin, 内閣/内閣総理大臣) indirectly elected by the Diet from the Diet	National Diet (Kokkai, 国会) bicameral, both houses directly elected
Prefectures ("Metropolis, prefecture, prefectures and prefectures") (to/dō/fu/ken, 都道府県); 47 contiguous subdivisions of the nation	Prefectural/"Metropolitan" government (to-/dō-/fu-/kenchō, 都道府県庁) local autonomy and delegated functions from national level	Prefectural/"Metropolitan" governor (to-/dō-/fu-/ken-chiji, 都道府県知事) directly elected	Prefectural/"Metropolitan" assembly (to-/dō-/fu-/ken-gikai, 都道府県議会) unicameral, directly elected
[Subprefectures] (various names); Sub-prefectural administrative divisions of some prefectures, contiguous in some prefectures, only partial for some areas in others in Tokyo: 4 subprefectures for remote islands	Branch office (shichō, 支庁 and other various names) (Subordinate branch offices of the prefectural government, delegated prefectural functions)		
Municipalities (Cities, [special] wards/"cities", towns and villages) (shi/[tokubetsu-]ku/chō [=machi]/son [=mura], 市区町村) (as of 2016: 1,741) contiguous subdivisions of all 47 prefectures in Tokyo often named in the order: -ku/-shi/-chō/-son, 区市町村 in Tokyo as of 2001: 62 municipalities (23 special wards, 26 cities, 5 towns, 8 villages)	Municipal government (city/ward/town/village hall) (shi-/ku-yakusho, 市/区役所/machi-/mura-yakuba, 町/村役場) local autonomy and delegated functions from national & prefectural level post-occupation–2000: only shi/chō/son with municipal autonomy rights, ku with delegated authority	Municipal (city/ward/town/village) mayor (shi-/ku-/chō-/sonchō, 市区町村長) directly elected in Tokyo's special wards: indirectly elected 1952–1975	Municipal (city/ward/town/village) assembly (shi-/ku-/chō-/son-gikai, 市区町村議会) unicameral, directly elected
[Wards, sometimes unambiguously "administrative wards"] ([gyōsei-]ku, [行政]区); Contiguous sub-municipal administrative divisions of designated major cities	Ward office (kuyakusho, 区役所) (Subordinate branch offices of the city government, delegated municipal functions)		

== List of special wards ==
No.	Flag	Name	Kanji	Population (as of October 2020)	Density (/km^{2})	Area (km^{2})	Major districts
01		Chiyoda	千代田区	66,680	5,718	11.66	Nagatachō, Kasumigaseki, Ōtemachi, Marunouchi, Akihabara, Yūrakuchō, Iidabashi, Kanda
02		Chūō	中央区	169,179	16,569	10.21	Nihonbashi, Kayabachō, Ginza, Tsukiji, Hatchōbori, Tsukishima
03		Minato	港区	260,486	12,787	20.37	Odaiba, Shinbashi, Hamamatsuchō, Mita, Toranomon, Azabu, Roppongi, Akasaka, Aoyama
04		Shinjuku	新宿区	349,385	19,175	18.22	Shinjuku, Takadanobaba, Ōkubo, Waseda, Kagurazaka, Ichigaya, Yotsuya
05		Bunkyō	文京区	240,069	21,263	11.29	Hongō, Yayoi, Hakusan
06		Taitō	台東区	211,444	20,914	10.11	Ueno, Asakusa
07		Sumida	墨田区	272,085	19,759	13.77	Kinshichō, Ryōgoku, Oshiage
08		Kōtō	江東区	524,310	13,055	40.16	Kameido, Ojima, Sunamachi, Tōyōchō, Kiba, Fukagawa, Toyosu, Ariake
09		Shinagawa	品川区	422,488	18,497	22.84	Shinagawa, Gotanda, Ōsaki, Hatanodai, Ōimachi, Tennōzu
10		Meguro	目黒区	288,088	19,637	14.67	Meguro, Nakameguro, Jiyugaoka, Komaba, Aobadai
11		Ōta	大田区	748,081	12,332	60.66	Ōmori, Kamata, Haneda, Den-en-chōfu
12		Setagaya	世田谷区	943,664	16,256	58.05	Shimokitazawa, Kinuta, Karasuyama, Tamagawa
13		Shibuya	渋谷区	243,883	16,140	15.11	Shibuya, Ebisu, Harajuku, Daikanyama, Hiroo
14		Nakano	中野区	344,880	22,121	15.59	Nakano
15		Suginami	杉並区	591,108	17,354	34.06	Kōenji, Asagaya, Ogikubo
16		Toshima	豊島区	301,599	23,182	13.01	Ikebukuro, Komagome, Senkawa, Sugamo
17		Kita	北区	355,213	17,234	20.61	Akabane, Ōji, Tabata
18		Arakawa	荒川区	217,475	21,405	10.16	Arakawa, Machiya, Nippori, Minamisenju
19		Itabashi	板橋区	584,483	18,140	32.22	Itabashi, Takashimadaira
20		Nerima	練馬区	752,608	15,653	48.08	Nerima, Shakujiimachi, Ōizumi-Gakuenchō, Hikarigaoka
21		Adachi	足立区	695,043	13,052	53.25	Ayase, Kitasenju, Takenotsuka
22		Katsushika	葛飾区	453,093	13,019	34.80	Tateishi, Aoto, Kameari, Shibamata
23		Edogawa	江戸川区	697,932	13,986	49.90	Kasai, Koiwa
Overall				9,733,276	15,724	618.8	

== Notable districts ==
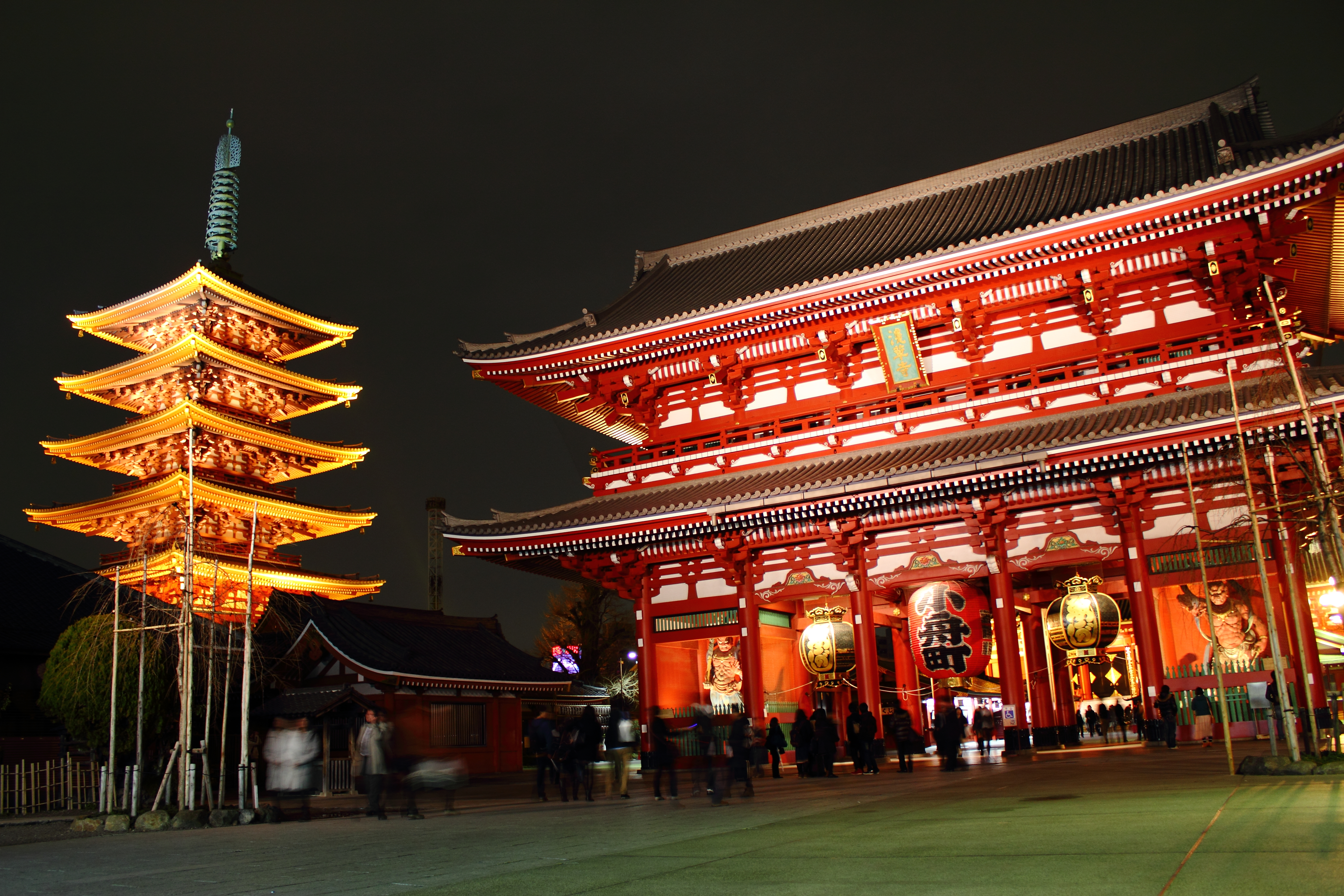
Asakusa

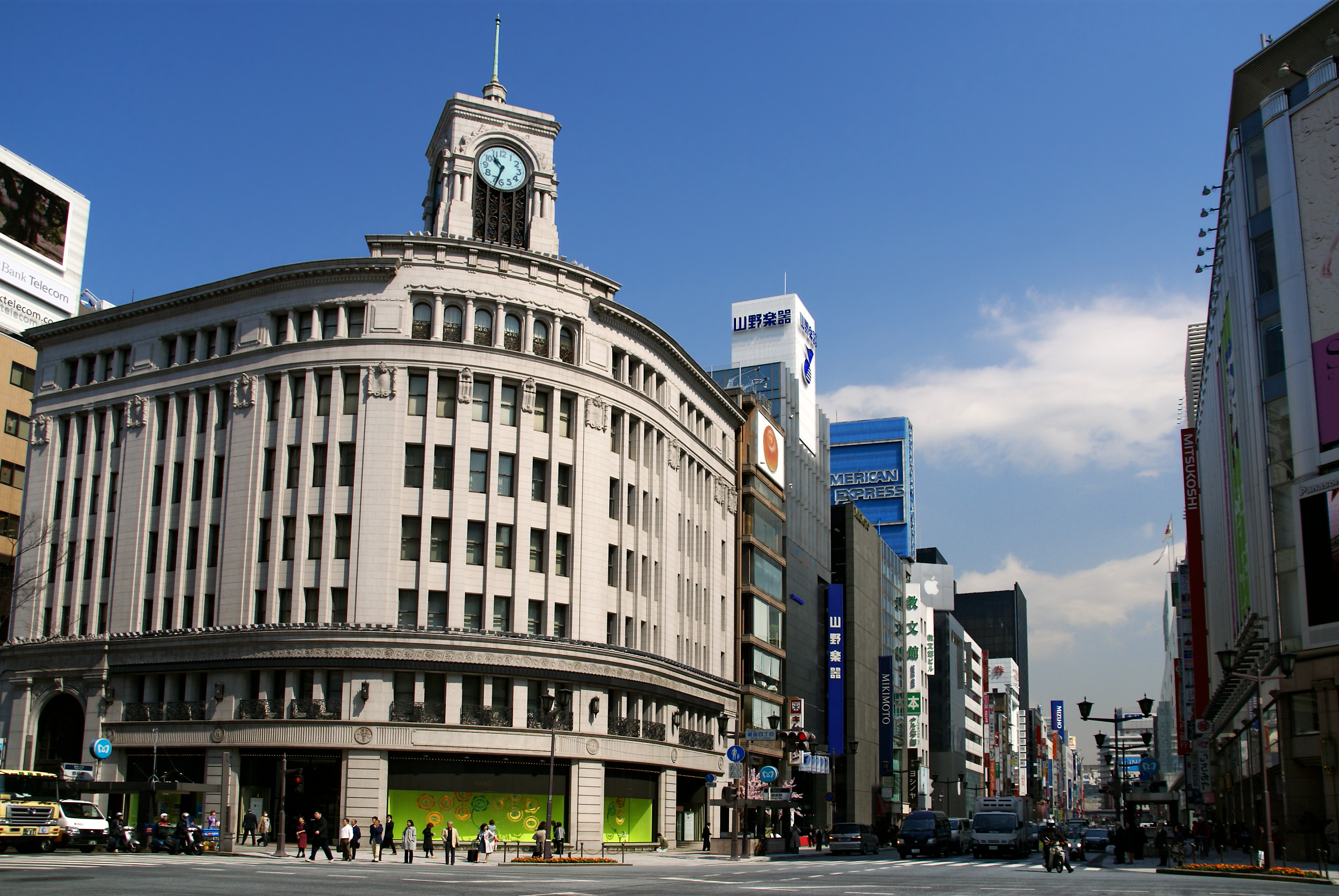
Ginza

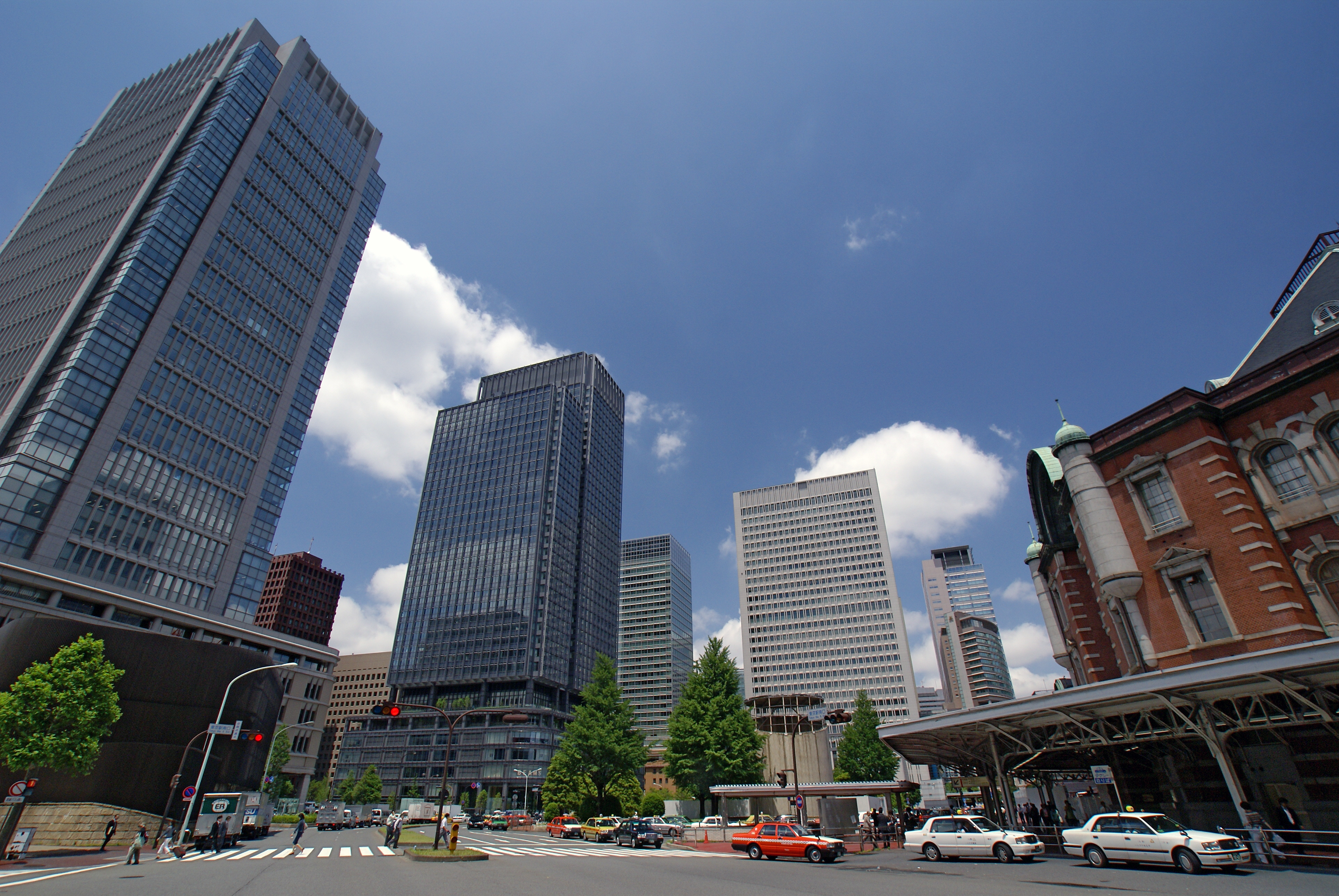
Marunouchi

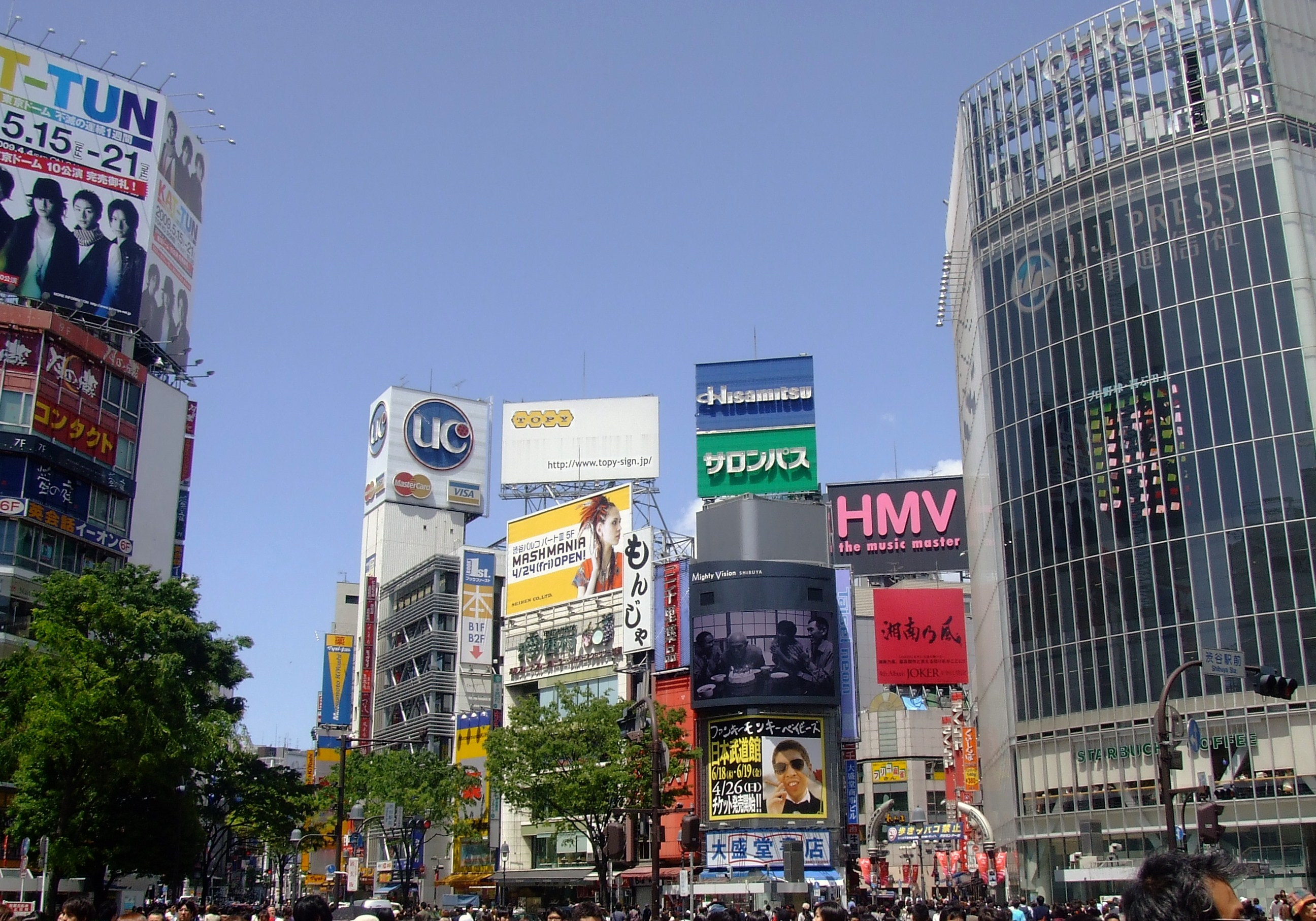
Shibuya

Shinjuku

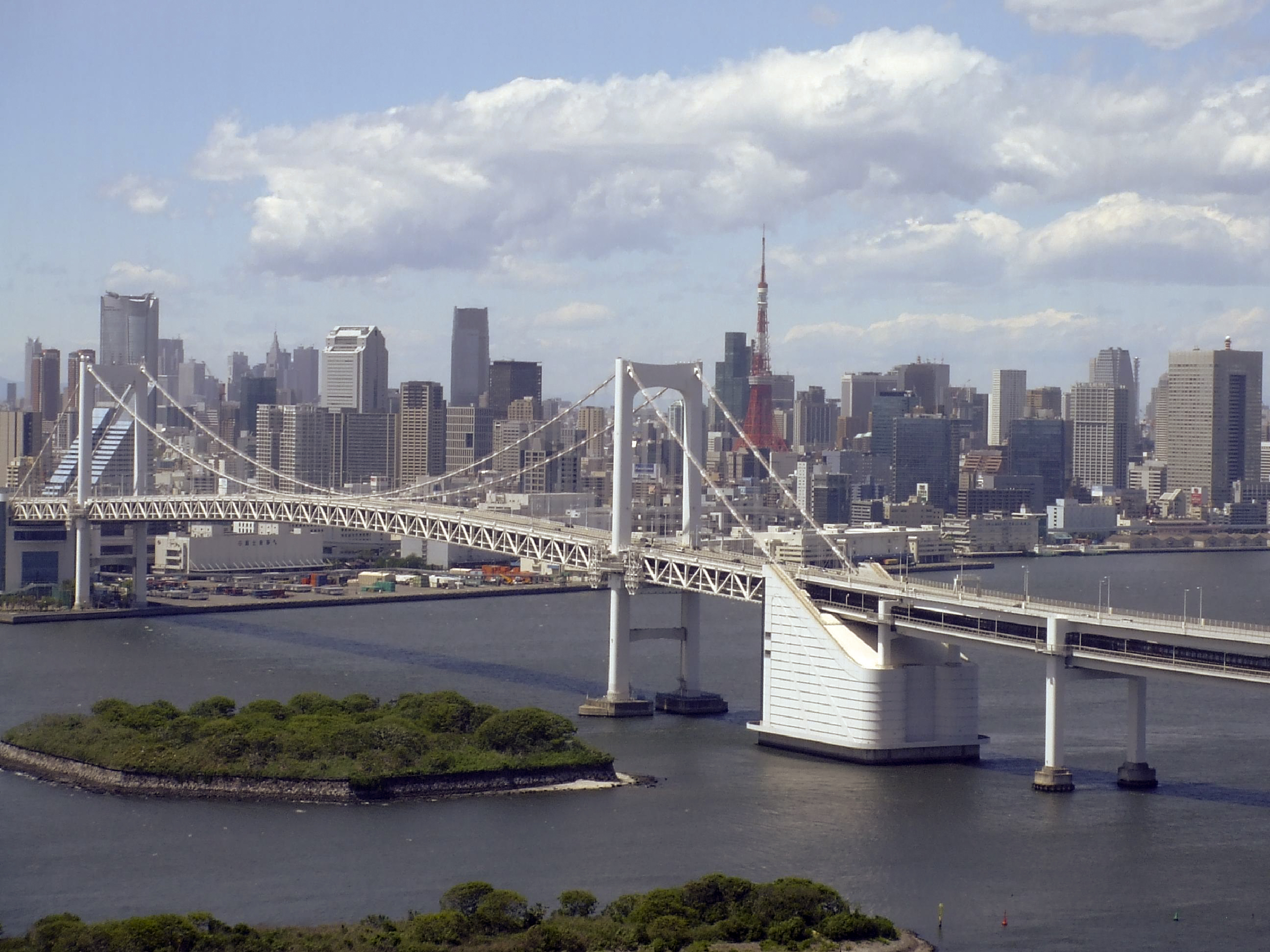
Rainbow Bridge and Tokyo Tower viewed from Odaiba

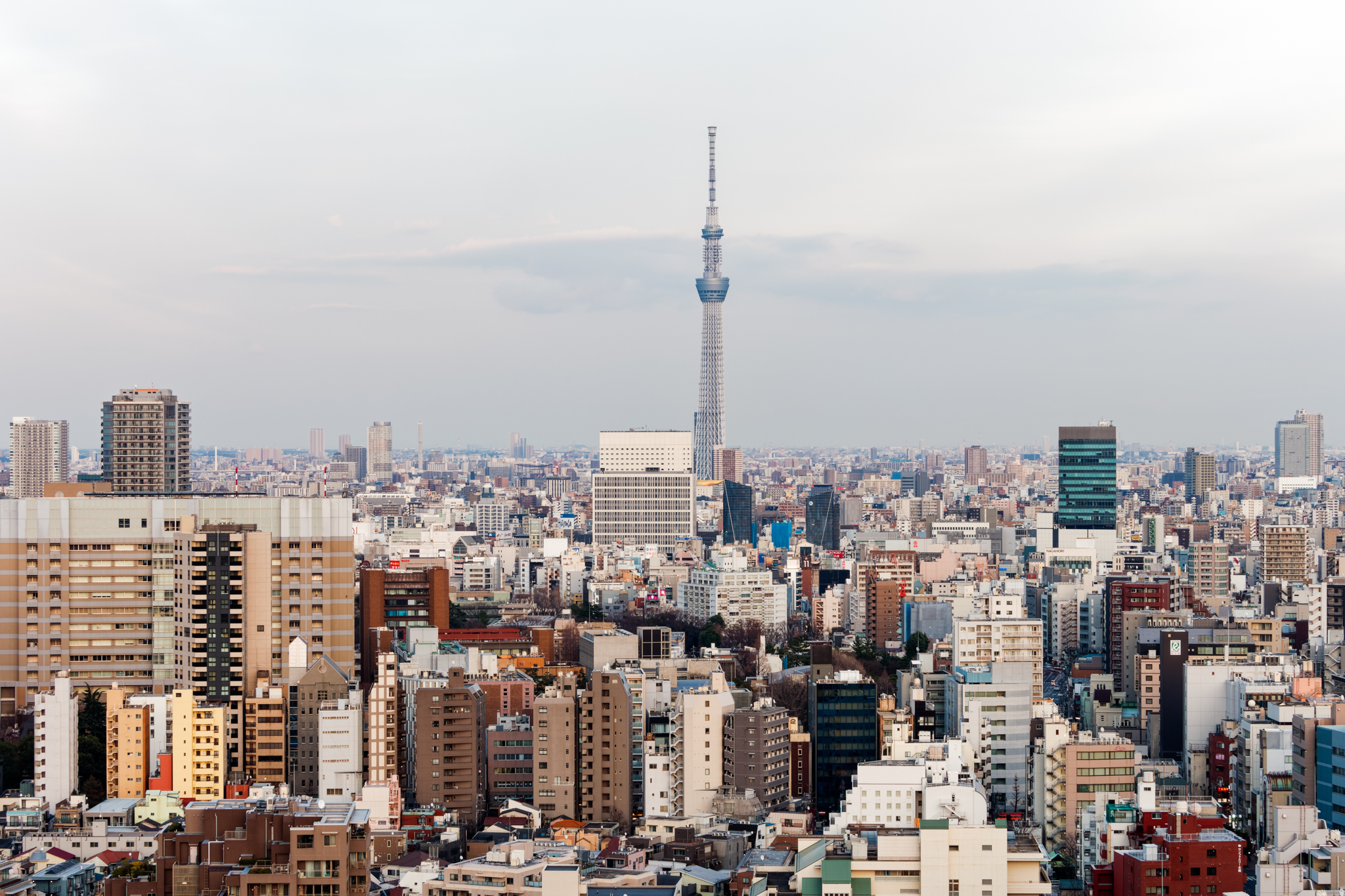
Tokyo Skytree, Sumida

Many important districts are located in Tokyo's special wards:

Akasaka
A district with a range of restaurants, clubs, and hotels; many pedestrian alleys give it a local neighborhood feel. It is next to Roppongi, Nagatachō, and Aoyama.
Akihabara
A densely arranged shopping district popular for electronics, anime culture, amusement arcades, and otaku goods.
Aoyama
A neighborhood of Tokyo adjacent to Omotesando with parks, trendy cafes, and international restaurants.
Asakusa
A cultural center of Tokyo, famous for the Sensō-ji Buddhist temple, and several traditional shopping streets. For most of the twentieth century, Asakusa was the main entertainment district in Tokyo, with large theaters, cinemas, an amusement park and a red light district. The area was heavily damaged by US bombing raids during World War II, and has now been rivaled by newer districts in the west of the city as entertainment and commercial centers.
Ginza and Yūrakuchō
Major shopping and entertainment district with historic department stores, upscale shops selling brand-name goods, and movie theaters. This area is part of the original city center in the wards of Chuo and Chiyoda (as opposed to the new centers in Shinjuku, Ikebukuro, and Shibuya).
Harajuku
Known internationally for its role in Japanese street fashion.
Ikebukuro
The busiest interchange in north central Tokyo, featuring Sunshine City and various shopping destinations.
Jinbōchō
Often referred to as "Book Town," Tokyo's center of used-book stores and publishing houses, and a popular antique and curio shopping area.
Kasumigaseki
Home to most of the executive offices of the national government, as well as the Tokyo Metropolitan Police.
Marunouchi and Ōtemachi
As one of the main financial and business districts of Tokyo, Marunouchi includes the headquarters of many banks, trading companies, and other major corporations. The area is seeing a major redevelopment in the near future with plans for new buildings and skyscrapers for shopping and entertainment constructed on the Marunouchi side of Tokyo Station. This area is part of the original city center in the wards of Chuo and Chiyoda (as opposed to the new centers in Shinjuku, Ikebukuro, and Shibuya).
Nagatachō
The political heart of Tokyo and the nation. It is the location of the National Diet (parliament), government ministries, and party headquarters.
Odaiba
A large, reclaimed, waterfront area that has become one of Tokyo's most popular shopping and entertainment districts. It resides on a man-made island.
Omotesandō
Known for upscale shopping, fashion, and design.
Roppongi
Home to the rich Roppongi Hills area, Mori Tower, an active night club scene, and a relatively large presence of Western tourists and expatriates.
Ryōgoku
The heart of the sumo world. Home to the Ryōgoku Kokugikan and many sumo stables.
Shibuya
A long-time center of shopping, fashion, nightlife, and youth culture. Shibuya is a famous and popular location for photographers and tourists.
Shinagawa
In addition to the major hotels on the west side of Shinagawa Station, the former "sleepy east side of the station" has been redeveloped as a major center for business. Shinagawa station is in Minato-ku, not in Shinagawa-ku.
Shinbashi
A traditional Shitamachi district. Revitalization of it being the gateway to Odaiba and the Shiodome Shiosite complex of high-rise buildings began in 2016, and was completed in 2018.
Shinjuku
Location of the Tokyo Metropolitan Government Building, and a major secondary center of Tokyo (fukutoshin), as opposed to the original center in Marunouchi and Ginza. The area is known for its concentration of skyscrapers and shopping areas. Major department stores, electronics stores and hotels are located here. On the east side of Shinjuku Station, Kabukichō is known for its many bars and nightclubs. Shinjuku Station moves an estimated three million passengers a day, which makes it the busiest rail station in the world.
Ueno
Ueno is known for its parks, department stores, and large concentration of cultural institutions. Ueno Zoo and Ueno Park are located here. Ueno Station is a major transportation hub serving commuters to and from areas north and east of Tokyo. In the spring, the area is a popular locale to view cherry blossoms.

== See also ==
- Administrative division
- Capital of Japan
- List of cities in Japan
- Special cities of Japan
- Urban area
- Wards of Japan
