= Hon-Yoshiwara Station =

Railway station in Fuji, Shizuoka Prefecture, Japan

Hon-Yoshiwara Station 本吉原駅
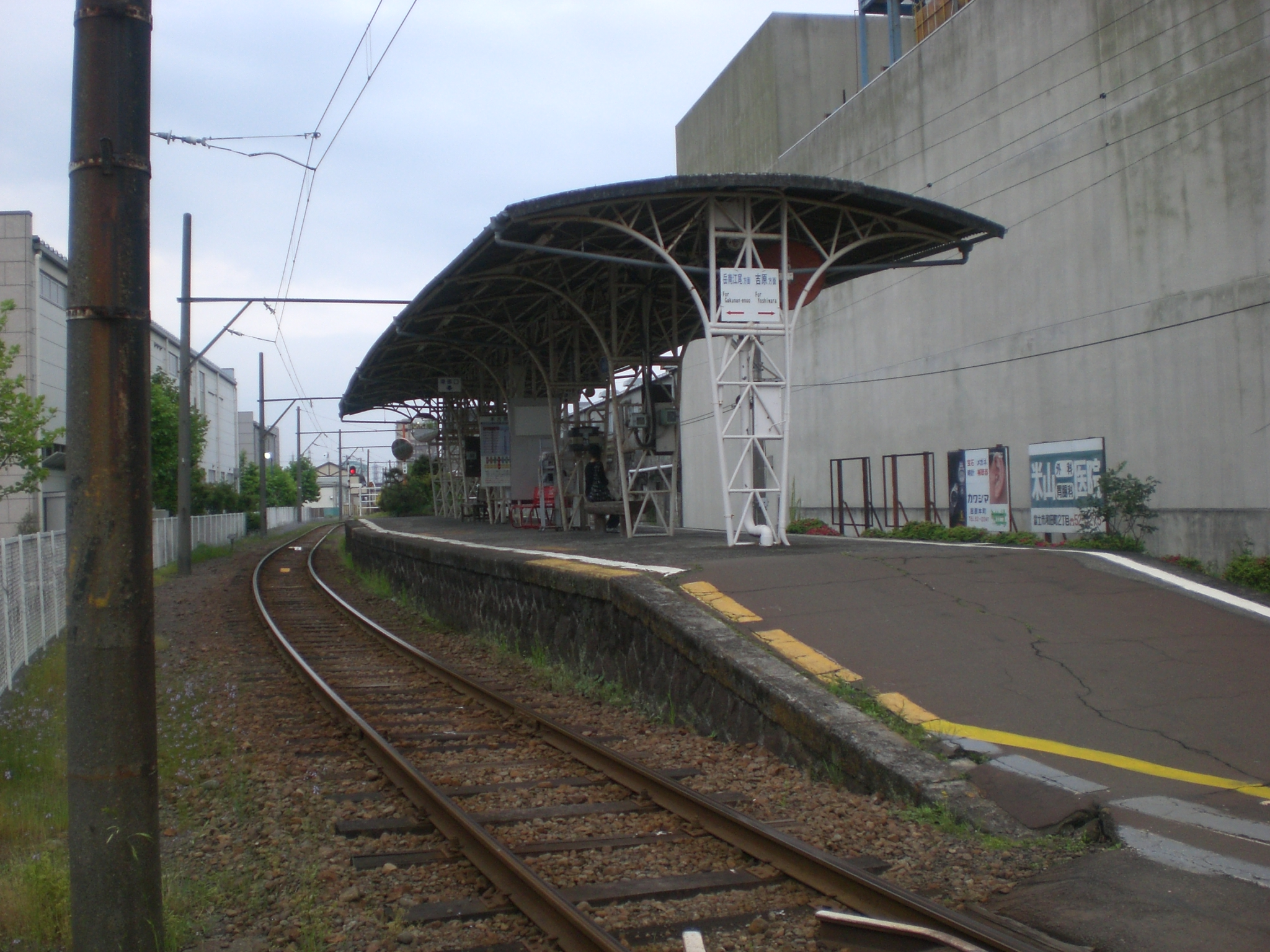
- Hon-Yoshiwara Station in April 2008

General information
- Location: Imaizumi 1-chōme 17-39, Fuji-shi, Shizuoka-ken; Japan
- Coordinates: 35°9′43.12″N 138°41′33.30″E
- Operator: Gakunan Electric Train
- Line: ■ Gakunan Railway Line
- Distance: 3.0 kilometers from Yoshiwara
- Platforms: 1 island platform

Other information
- Status: Unstaffed

History
- Opened: April 18, 1950
- Former names: Yoshiwara (to 1956)

Passengers
- FY2017: 353 daily
Location
- Location within Shizuoka Prefecture Location within Japan

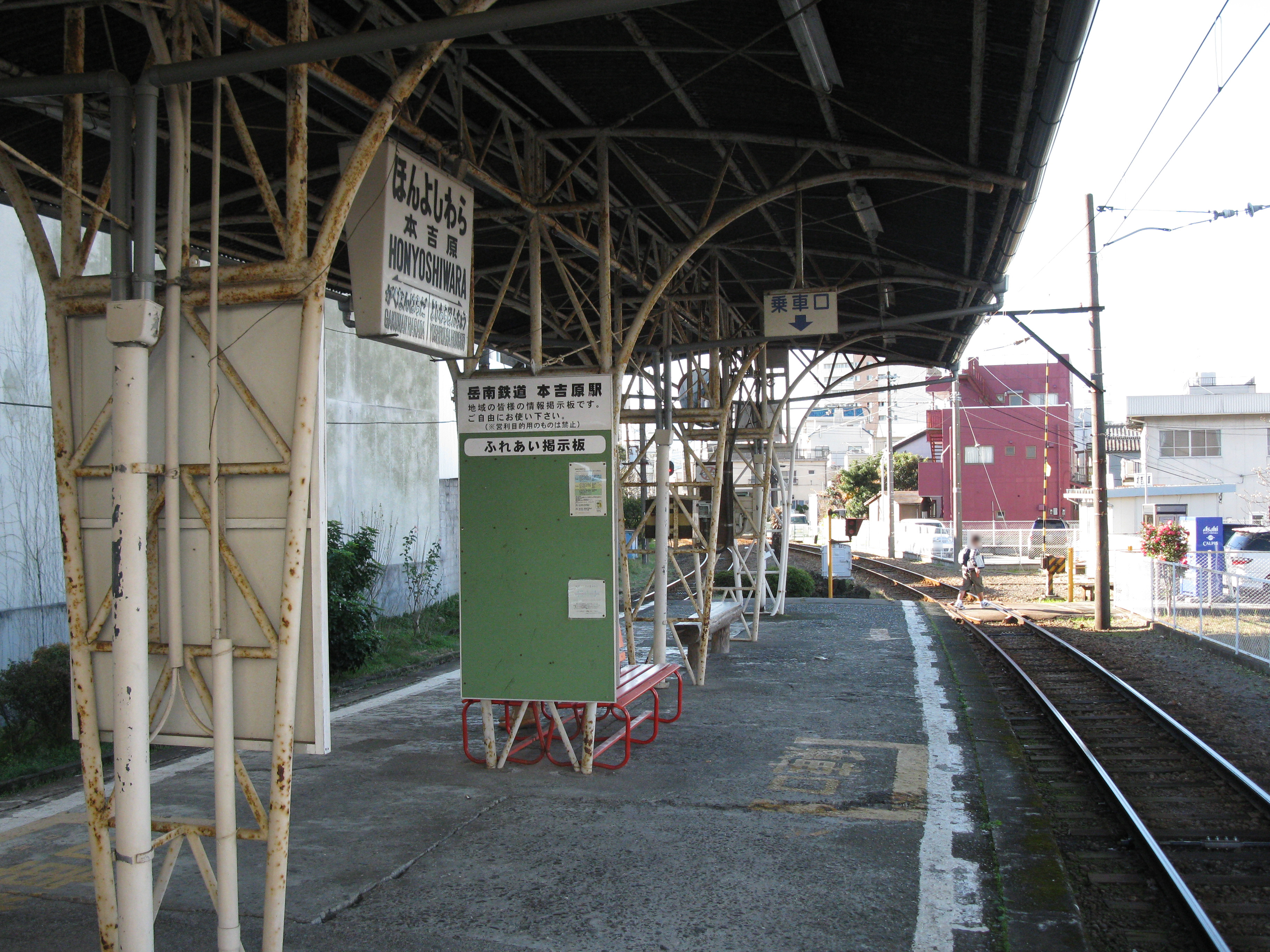
Platform

Hon-Yoshiwara Station (本吉原駅, Hon-Yoshiwara-eki) is a railway station in the city of Fuji, Shizuoka Prefecture, Japan, operated by the private railway operator Gakunan Railway.

== Lines ==
Hon-Yoshiwara Station is served by the Gakunan Railway Line, and is located 3.0 kilometers from the terminal of the line at Yoshiwara.

== Station layout ==
Hon-Yoshiwara Station has one island platform connected to street by a level crossing. There is no station building and the station is unattended.

== Adjacent stations ==
«	Service	»
Gakunan Railway Line
Yoshiwara-honchō	-	Gakunan-Harada

== Station history ==
Hon-Yoshiwara Station was opened on April 18, 1950 as Yoshiwara Station (吉原駅, Yoshiwara-eki). It was renamed to its present name on April 10, 1956. It has been unstaffed since 1993.

== Passenger statistics ==
In fiscal 2017, the station was used by an average of 353 passengers daily (boarding passengers only).

== Surrounding area ==
- Gakunan Electric Train Company head office
- Yoshiwara No.1 Junior High School
- Imaizumi Elementary School

== See also ==
- List of railway stations in Japan
