= Kamiya Station =

Railway station in Fuji, Shizuoka Prefecture, Japan

Kamiya Station 神谷駅
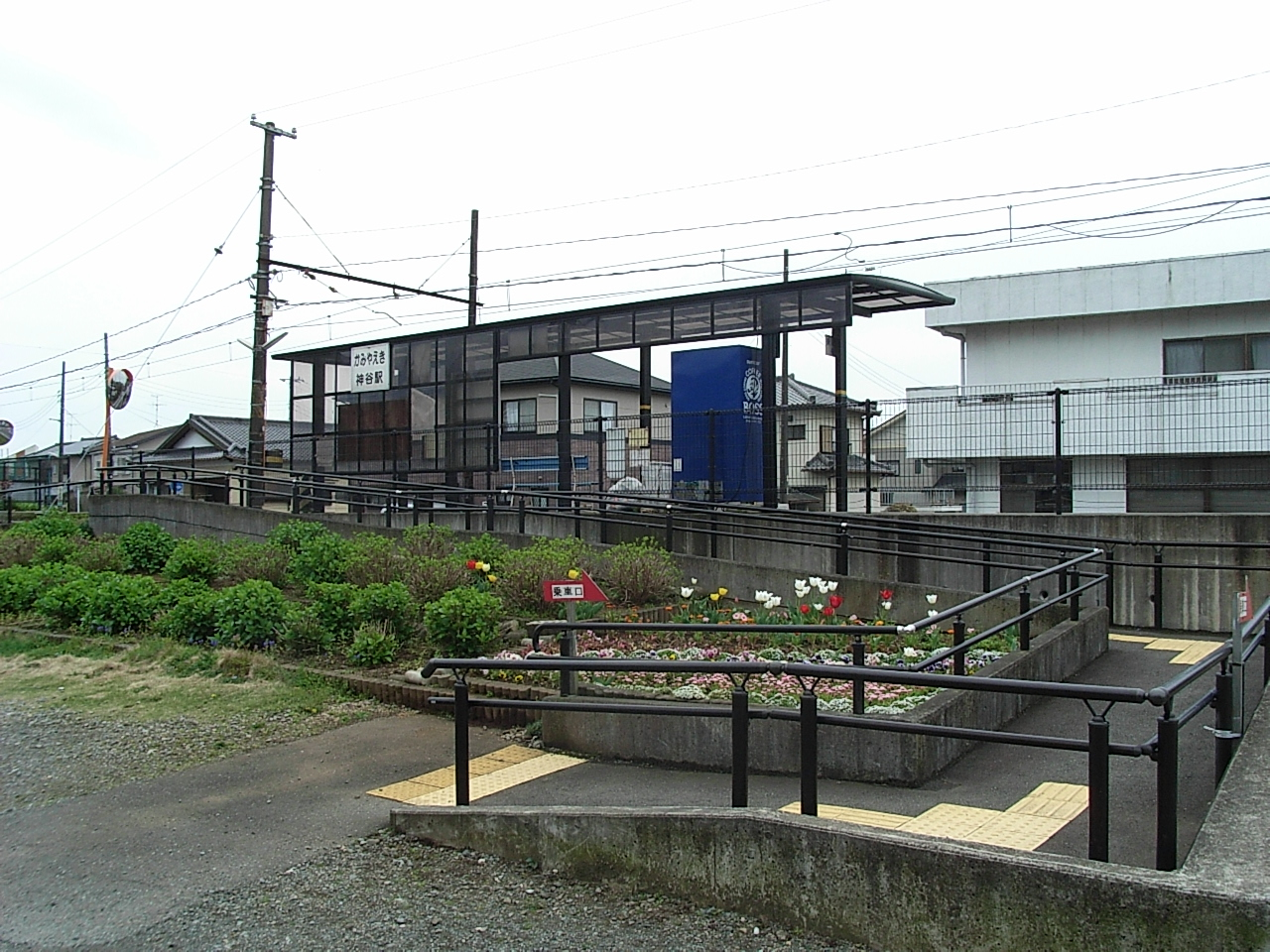
- Kamiya Station in April 2009

General information
- Location: Kamiya 379-2, Fuji-shi, Shizuoka-ken; Japan
- Coordinates: 35°9′39.78″N 138°44′35.07″E
- Operator: Gakunan Electric Train
- Line: ■ Gakunan Railway Line
- Distance: 8.2 kilometers from Yoshiwara
- Platforms: 1 side platform

Other information
- Status: Unstaffed

History
- Opened: January 20, 1953

Passengers
- FY2017: 121 daily
Location
- Location within Shizuoka Prefecture Location within Japan

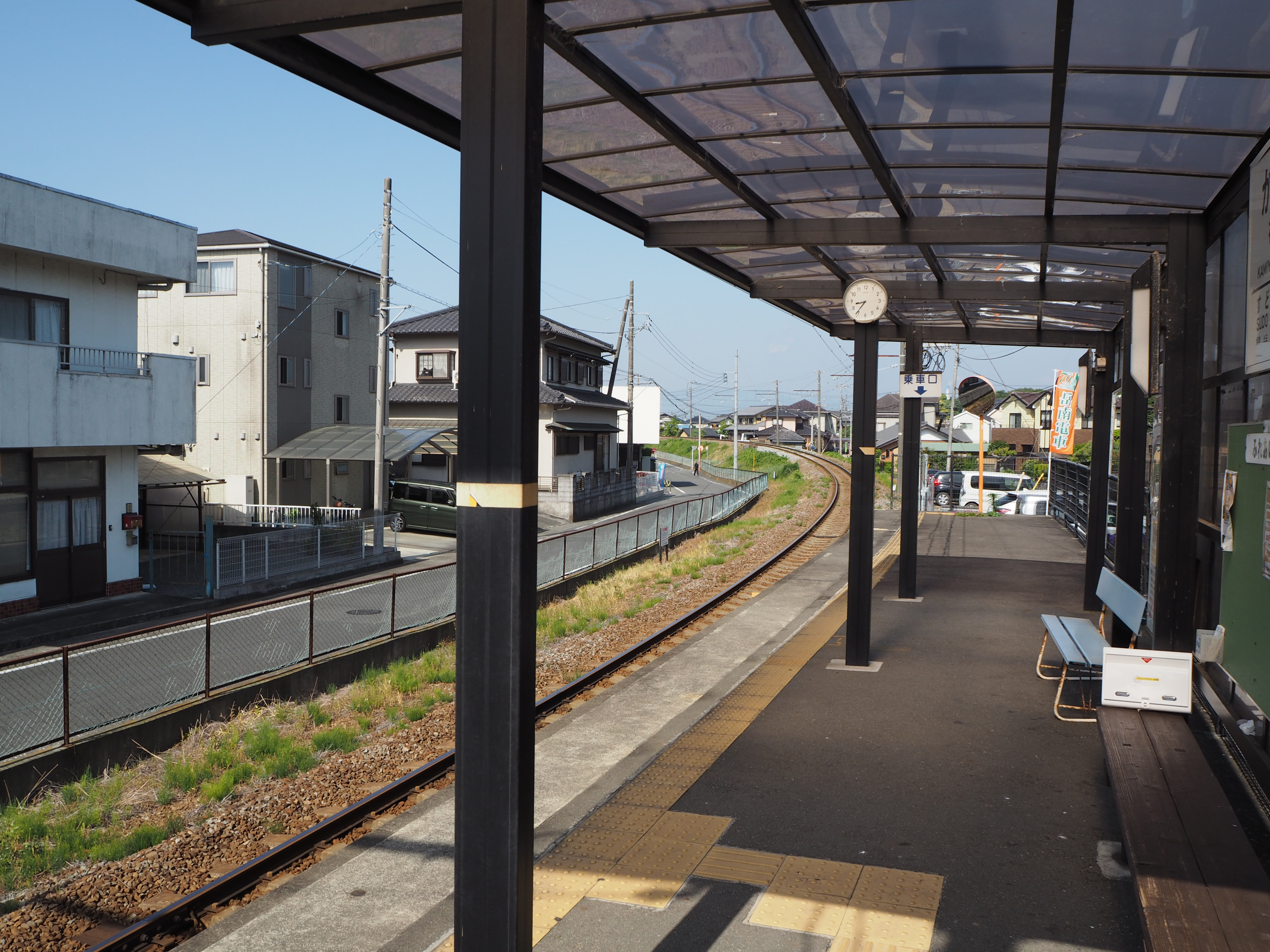
rear view of station building

Kamiya Station (神谷駅, Kamiya-eki) is a railway station in the city of Fuji, Shizuoka Prefecture, Japan, operated by the private railway operator Gakunan Railway.

== Lines ==
Kamiya Station is served by the Gakunan Railway Line, and is located 8.2 kilometers from the terminal of the line at Yoshiwara.

== Station layout ==
Kamiya Station has one side platform serving a single track bi-directional. The station is unattended. In 2002, it was rebuilt with a sloping platform to permit barrier free access.

== Adjacent stations ==
«	Service	»
Gakunan Railway Line
Sudo	-	Gakunan-Enoo

== Station history ==
Kamiya Station was opened on January 20, 1953.

== Passenger statistics ==
In fiscal 2017, the station was used by an average of 121 passengers daily (boarding passengers only).

== Surrounding area ==
- Sudo Junior High School
- Sudo Elementary School

== See also ==
- List of railway stations in Japan
