= Gakunan-Harada Station =

Railway station in Fuji, Shizuoka Prefecture, Japan

Gakunan Harada Station 岳南原田駅
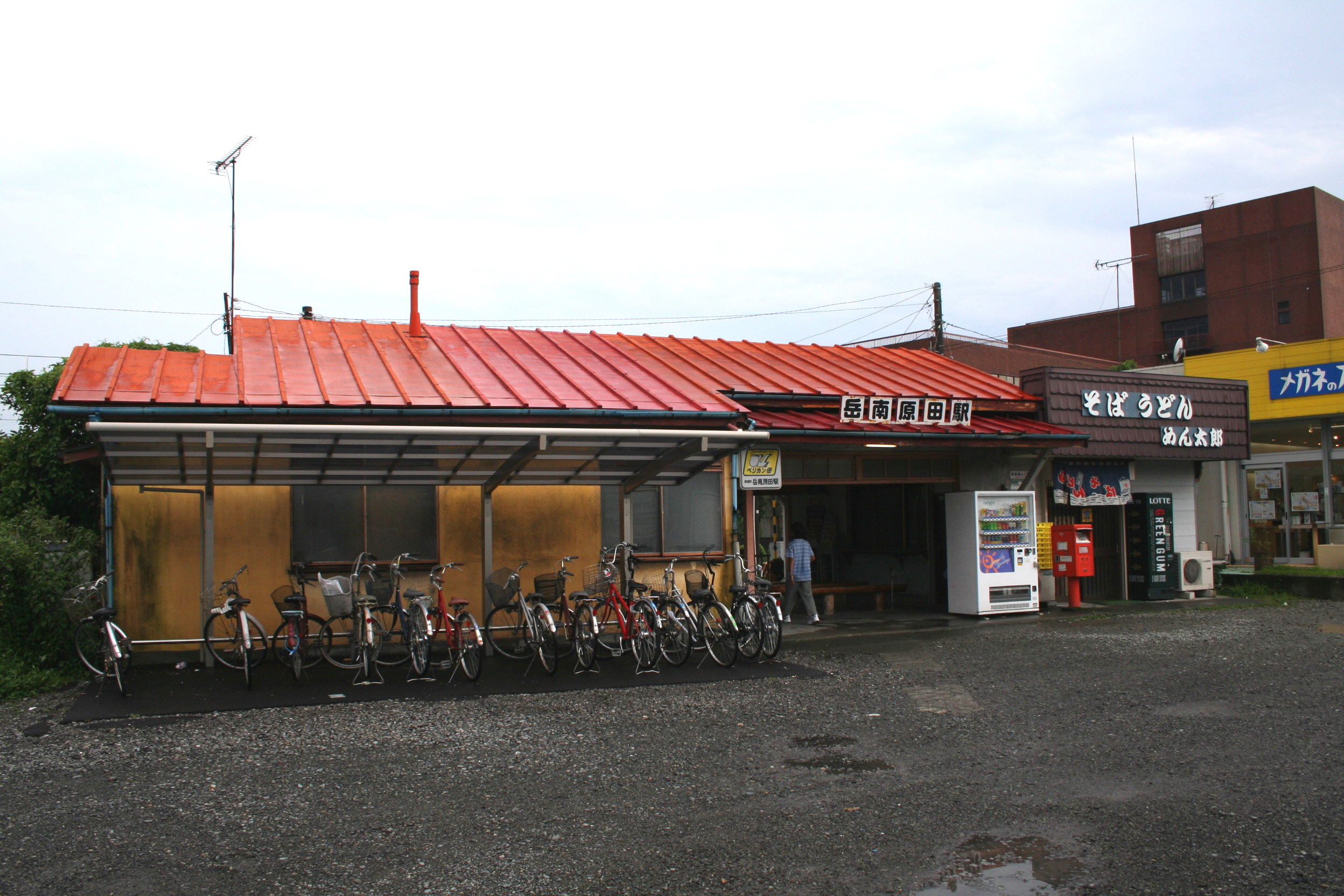
- Gakunan-Harada Station in August 2006

General information
- Location: Harada 217-1, Fuji-shi, Shizuoka-ken; Japan
- Coordinates: 35°9′58.24″N 138°42′19.45″E
- Operator: Gakunan Electric Train
- Line: ■ Gakunan Railway Line
- Distance: 4.4 kilometers from Yoshiwara
- Platforms: 1 island platform

Other information
- Status: Unstaffed

History
- Opened: December 20, 1951.

Passengers
- FY2017: 263 daily
Location
- Location within Shizuoka Prefecture Location within Japan

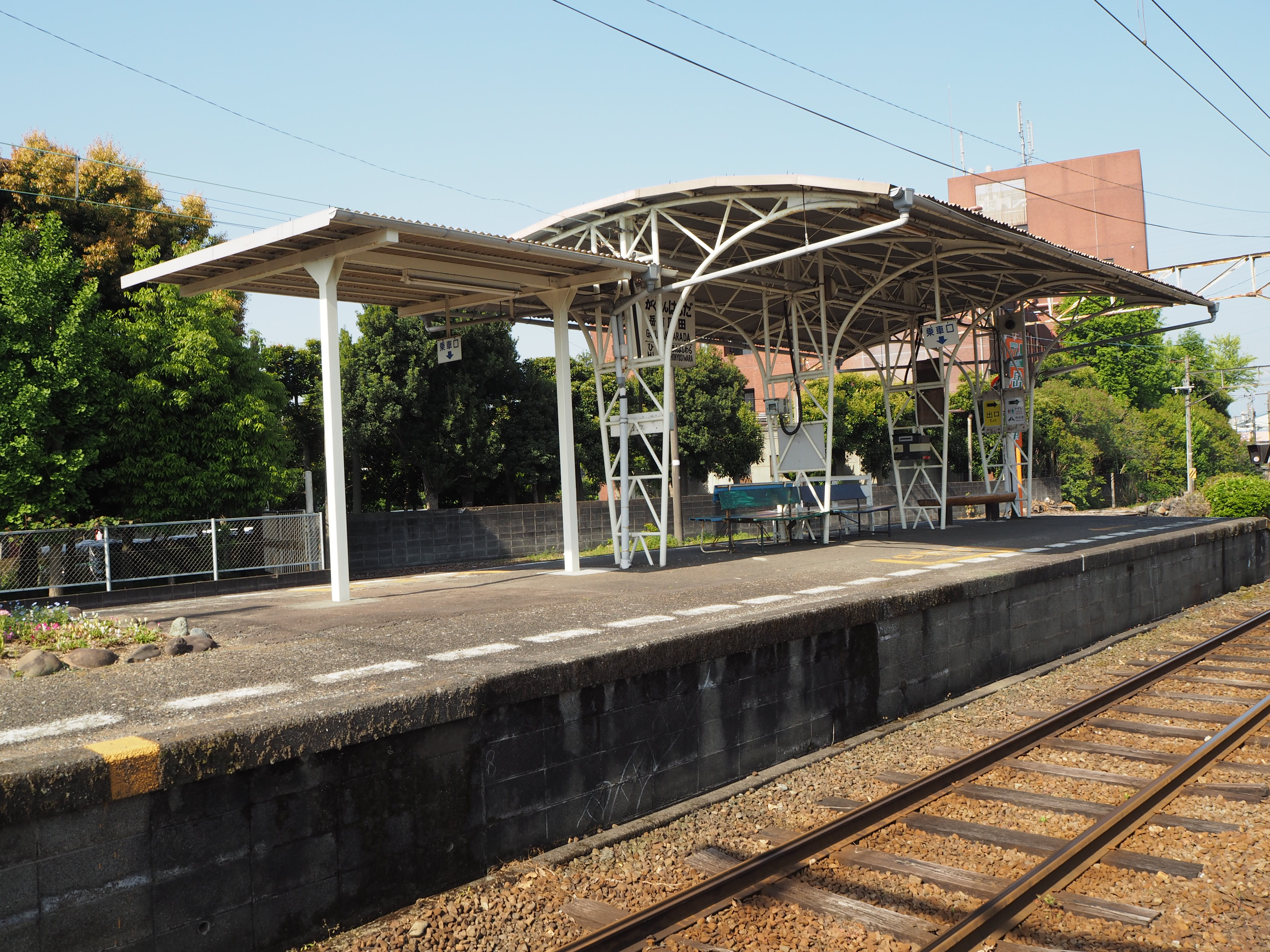
Platform

Gakunan-Harada Station (岳南原田駅, Gakunan-Harada-eki) is a railway station in the city of Fuji, Shizuoka Prefecture, Japan, operated by the private railway operator Gakunan Railway.

== Lines ==
Gakunan-Harada Station is served by the Gakunan Railway Line, and is located 4.4 kilometers from the terminal of the line at Yoshiwara.

== Station layout ==
Gakunan-Harada Station has one island platform connected to the station building by a level crossing. It is staffed only during the morning commuting hours. In addition, adjacent multiple tracks used for container freight services as well as private freight services to the nearby Nippon Daishowa Paperboard Company factories parallel the passenger tracks.

== Adjacent stations ==
«	Service	»
Gakunan Railway Line
Hon-Yoshiwara	-	Hina

== Station history ==
Gakunan-Harada Station was opened on December 20, 1951.

== Passenger statistics ==
In fiscal 2017, the station was used by an average of 263 passengers daily (boarding passengers only).

== Surrounding area ==
- Harada Elementary School

== See also ==
- List of railway stations in Japan
