= Hara Station (Shizuoka) =

Railway station in Numazu, Shizuoka Prefecture, Japan

CA05 Hara Station 原駅
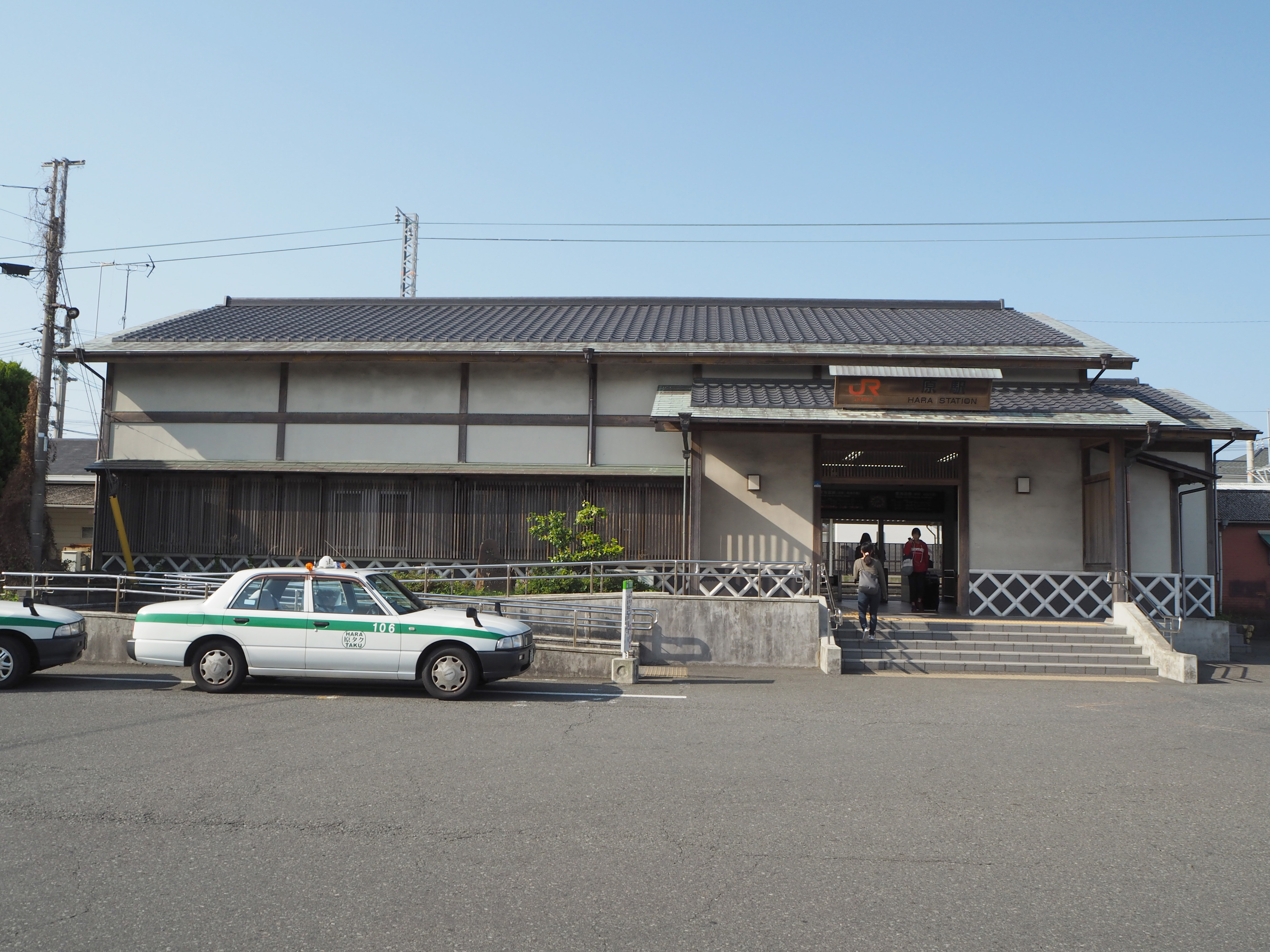
- Hara Station in April 2018

General information
- Location: Hara 383-2, Numazu-shi, Shizuoka-ken; Japan
- Coordinates: 35°7′29.68″N 138°47′37.15″E
- Operator: JR Central
- Line: ■ Tokaido Main Line
- Distance: 132.8 km from Tokyo
- Platforms: 1 side + 1 island platform
- Tracks: 2
- Connections: Bus terminal

Other information
- Station code: CA05
- Website: Official website

History
- Opened: 21 March 1987

Passengers
- FY2017: 2328 daily
Location
- Location within Shizuoka Prefecture Location within Japan

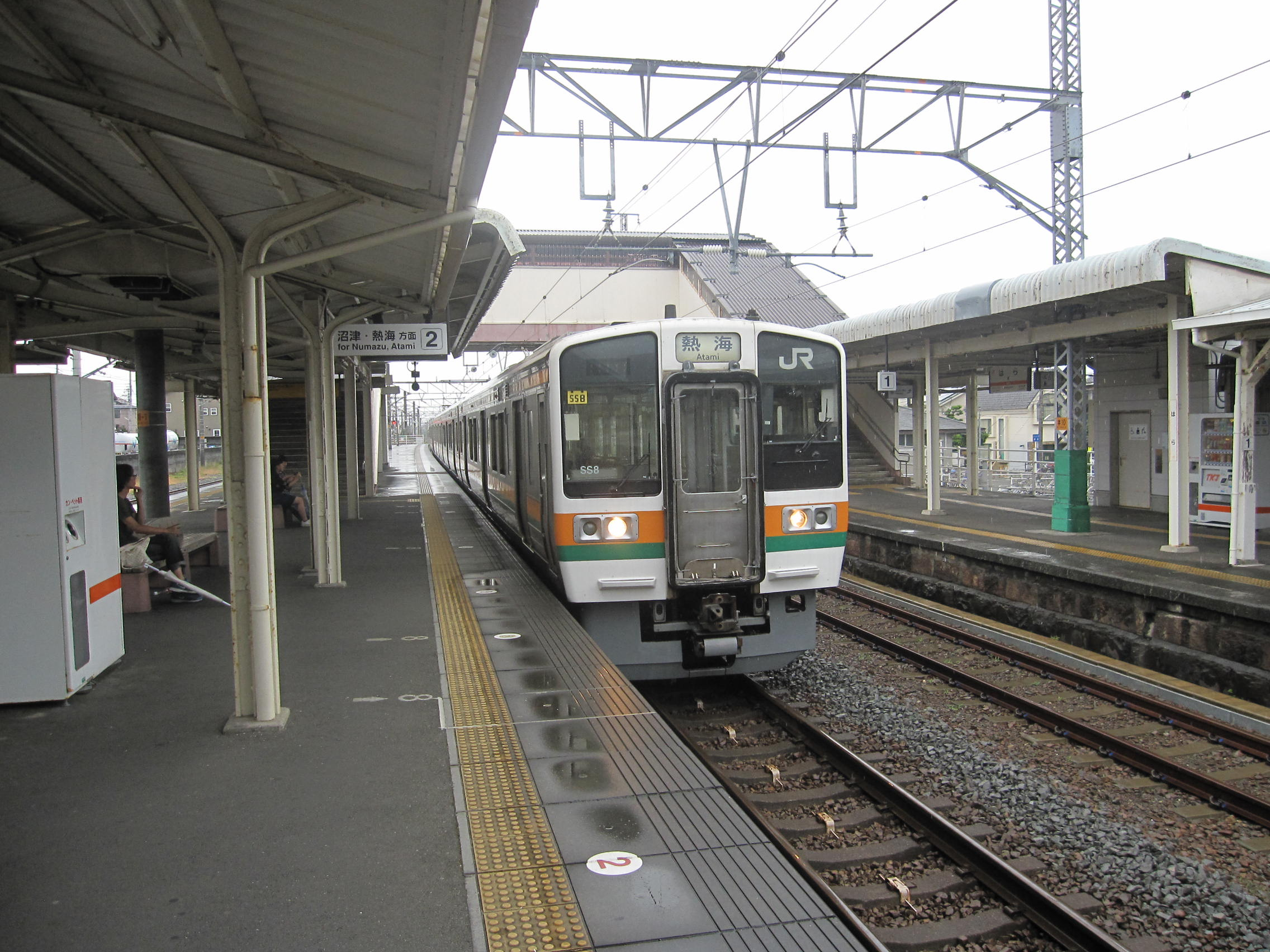
Platforms

Hara Station (原駅, Hara-eki) is a railway station in the city of Numazu, Shizuoka Prefecture, Japan, on the Tōkaidō Main Line, operated by Central Japan Railway Company (JR Central).

== Lines ==
Hara Station is served by the Tōkaidō Main Line, and is located 132.8 kilometers from the starting point of the line at Tokyo Station.

== Station layout ==
The station has a single side platform serving Track 1 and an island platform serving Track 2 and Track 3, connected to the station building by a footbridge. Track 1 is not in regular use. The station building has automated ticket machines, TOICA automated turnstiles and a staffed ticket office.

=== Platforms ===
1/2	■ Tokaido Main Line	for Numazu and Atami
3	■ Tokaido Main Line	for Shizuoka and Hamamatsu

== Adjacent stations ==
«	Service	»
Central Japan Railway Company
Tōkaidō Main Line CA05
Rapid: Does not stop at this station
Higashi-Tagonoura CA06	Local	Katahama CA04

== History ==
Hara Station was opened on February 25, 1900 as part of the expansion of the Tōkaidō Main Line from Numazu Station to Yoshiwara Station. The original station building was rebuilt in 1948. Regularly scheduled freight services were discontinued from 1984, and charter freight from 1997; however, freight services continue along a privately held spur line to a freight terminal owned by Taiheiyo Cement a short distance from Hara Station. With the privatization of JNR on 1 April 1987, the station came under the control of JR Central.

Station numbering was introduced to the section of the Tōkaidō Line operated JR Central in March 2018; Hara Station was assigned station number CA05.

== Passenger statistics ==
In fiscal 2017, the station was used by an average of 2328 passengers daily (boarding passengers only).

== Surrounding area ==
- Hara Junior High School
- Hara Elementary School

== See also ==
- List of railway stations in Japan
