= Yoshiwara-honchō Station =

Railway station in Fuji, Shizuoka Prefecture, Japan

Yoshiwara-honchō Station 吉原本町駅
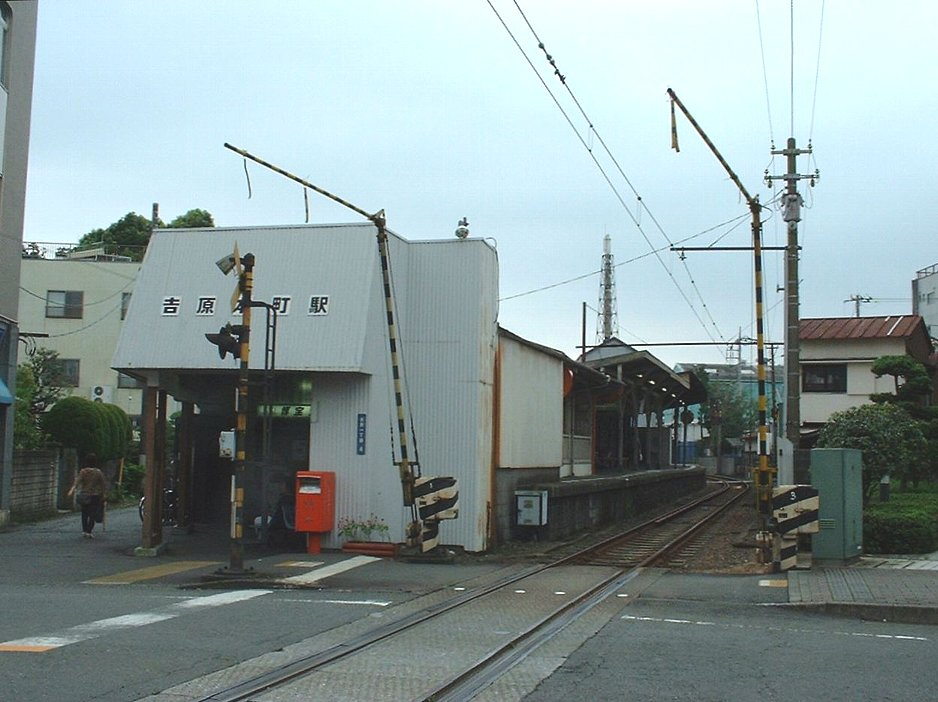
- Yoshiwara-honchō Station in September 2003

General information
- Location: Yoshiwara 1-chōme 84-2, Fuji-shi, Shizuoka-ken; Japan
- Coordinates: 35°9′39.20″N 138°41′23.85″E
- Operator: Gakunan Electric Train
- Line: ■ Gakunan Railway Line
- Distance: 2.7 kilometers from Yoshiwara
- Platforms: 1 side platform

Other information
- Status: Staffed

History
- Opened: November 18, 1949

Passengers
- FY2017: 1079 daily
Location
- Location within Shizuoka Prefecture Location within Japan

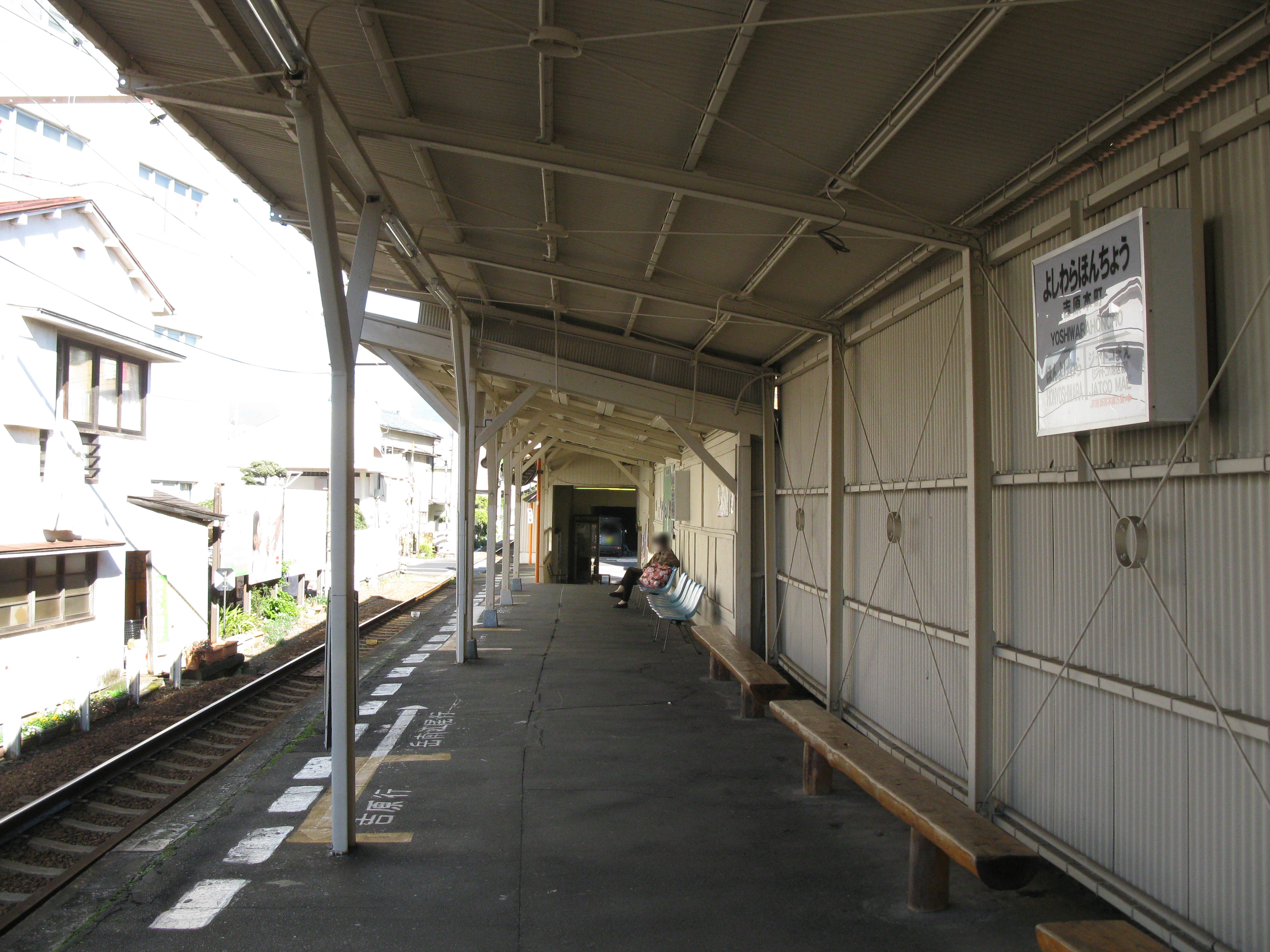
Platform

Yoshiwara-honchō Station (吉原本町駅, Yoshiwara-honchō-eki) is a railway station in the city of Fuji, Shizuoka Prefecture, Japan, operated by the private railway operator Gakunan Railway.

== Lines ==
Yoshiwara-honchō Station is served by the Gakunan Railway Line, and is located 2.7 kilometers from the terminal of the line at Yoshiwara.

== Station layout ==
Yoshiwara-honchō Station has one side platform serving a single bi-directional track. The station is staffed.

== Adjacent stations ==
«	Service	»
Gakunan Railway Line
Jatco Mae	-	Hon-Yoshiwara

== Station history ==
Yoshiwara-honchō Station was opened on November 18, 1949.

== Passenger statistics ==
In fiscal 2017, the station was used by an average of 1079 passengers daily (boarding passengers only).

== Surrounding area ==
- Fuji City Hall

== See also ==
- List of railway stations in Japan
