= Hina Station =

Railway station in Fuji, Shizuoka Prefecture, Japan

Hina Station 比奈駅
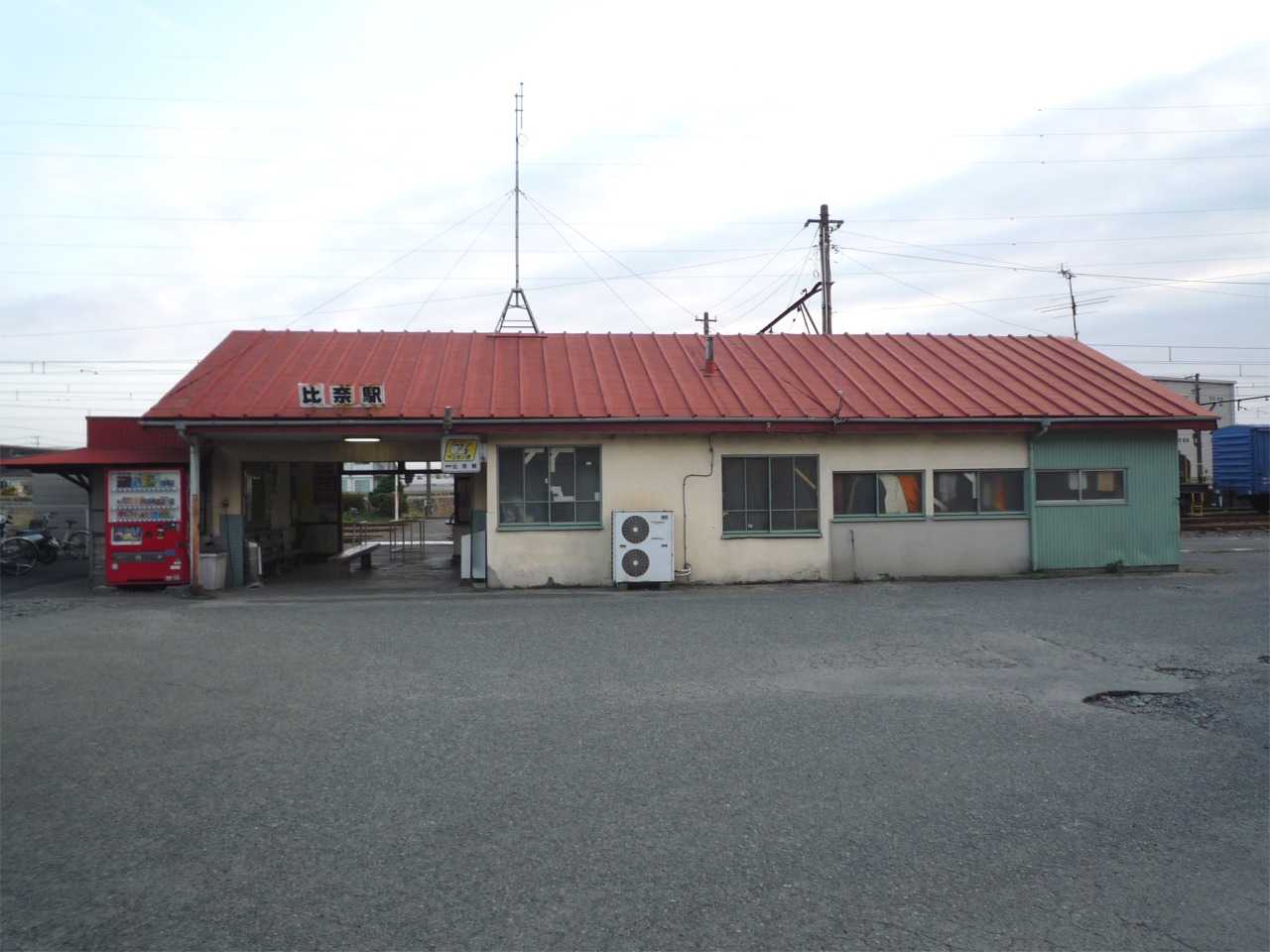
- Hina Station in March 2010

General information
- Location: Hina 1-666-1, Fuji-shi, Shizuoka-ken; Japan
- Coordinates: 35°9′42.15″N 138°42′49.81″E
- Operator: Gakunan Electric Train
- Line: ■ Gakunan Railway Line
- Distance: 5.4 kilometers from Yoshiwara
- Platforms: 1 island platform

Other information
- Status: Unstaffed

History
- Opened: December 20, 1951

Passengers
- FY2017: 142 daily
Location
- Location within Shizuoka Prefecture Location within Japan

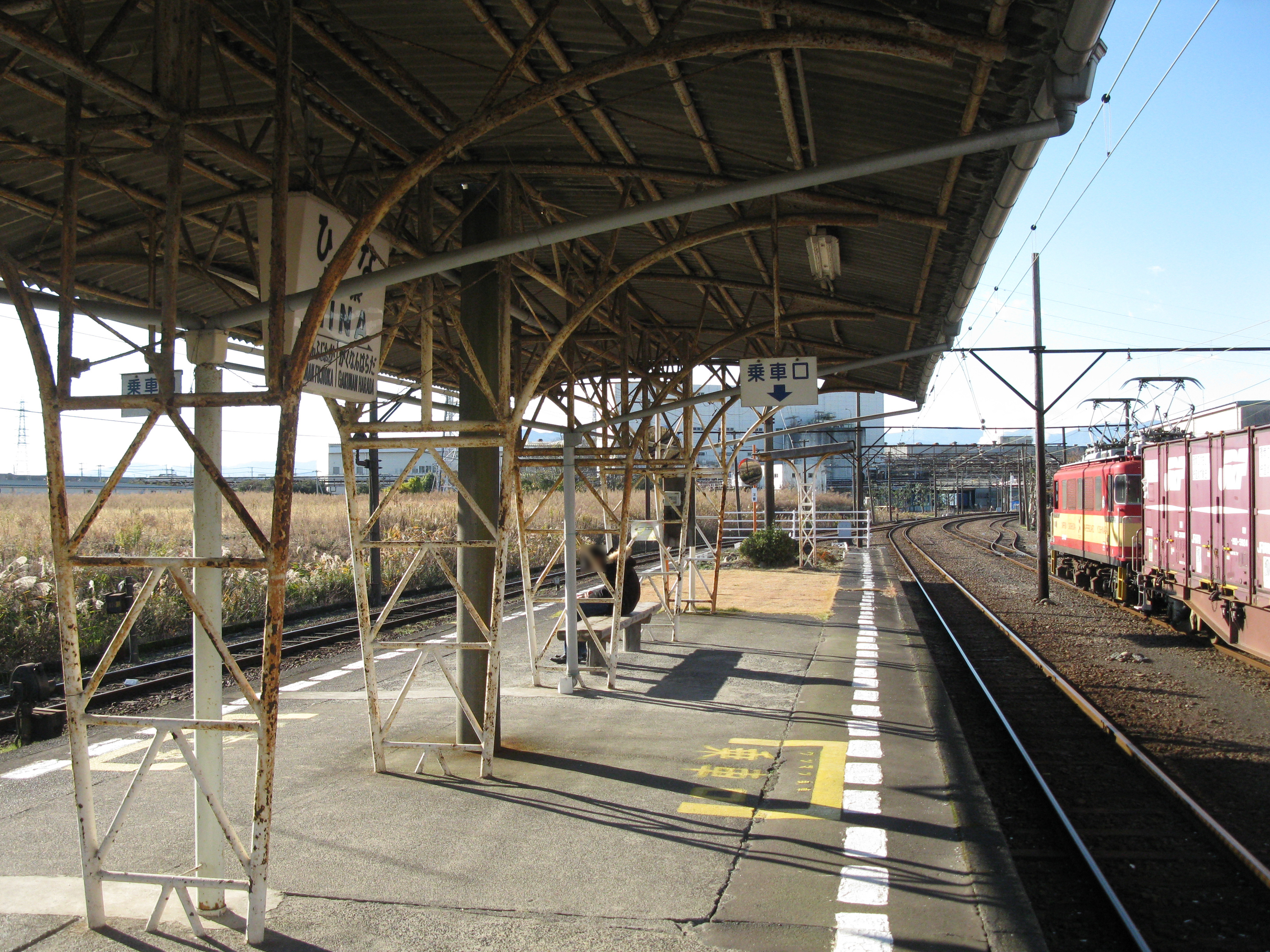
rear view of station building

Hina Station (比奈駅, Hina-eki) is a train station on the Gakunan Railway Line in the city of Fuji, Shizuoka Prefecture, Japan. It was the terminal station for all freight operations by the Gakunan Railway, which was discontinued in 2012.

== Lines ==
Kamiya Station is served by the Gakunan Railway Line, and is located 5.4 kilometers from the terminal of the line at Yoshiwara.

== Station layout ==
Kamiya Station has one island platform connected to the station building by a level crossing. The station is unattended. In addition, multiple tracks for container freight services to neighboring industries parallel the passenger tracks.

== Adjacent stations ==
«	Service	»
Gakunan Railway Line
Gakunan-Harada	-	Gakunan-Fujioka

== Station history ==
Hina Station was opened on December 20, 1951.

== Passenger statistics ==
In fiscal 2017, the station was used by an average of 142 passengers daily (boarding passengers only).

== Surrounding area ==
- Fuji City High School
- Fuji Yoshinaga Industrial High School

== See also ==
- List of Railway Stations in Japan
