= Sudo Station =

Railway station in Fuji, Shizuoka Prefecture, Japan

Sudo Station 須津駅
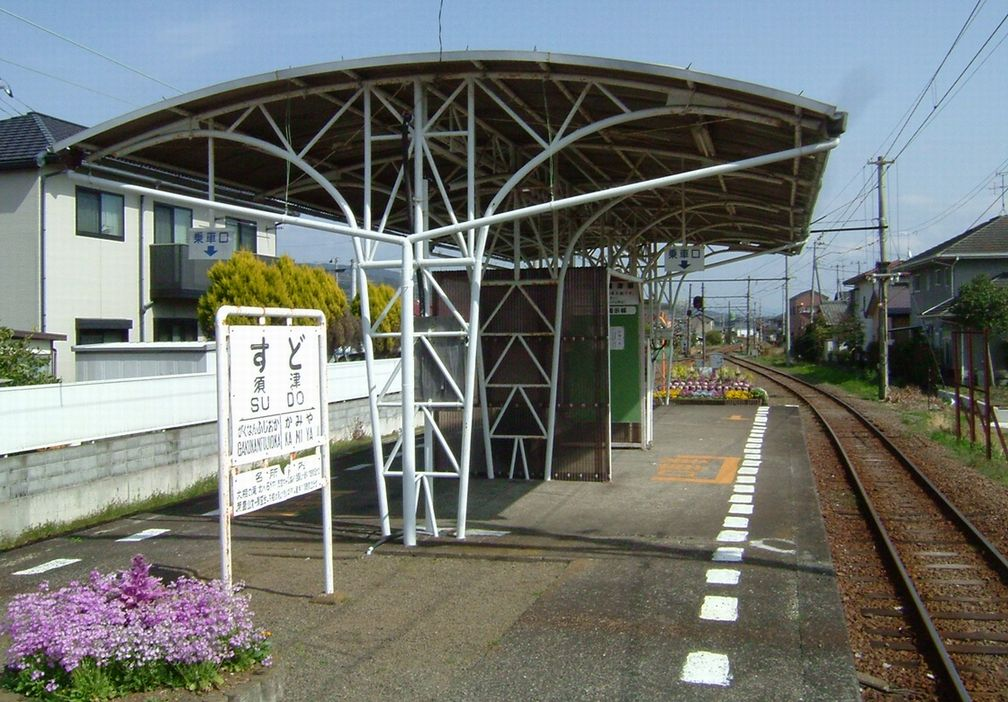
- Sudo Station in October 2007

General information
- Location: Nakasato 106-2, Fuji-shi, Shizuoka-ken; Japan
- Coordinates: 35°9′37.81″N 138°44′2.23″E
- Operator: Gakunan Electric Train
- Line: ■ Gakunan Railway Line
- Distance: 7.3 kilometers from Yoshiwara
- Platforms: 1 side platform

Other information
- Status: Unstaffed

History
- Opened: January 20, 1953

Passengers
- FY2017: 90 daily
Location
- Location within Shizuoka Prefecture Location within Japan

Sudo Station (須津駅, Sudo-eki) is a railway station in the city of Fuji, Shizuoka Prefecture, Japan, operated by the private railway operator Gakunan Railway.

== Lines ==
Sudo Station is served by the Gakunan Railway Line, and is located 7.3 kilometers from the terminal of the line at Yoshiwara.

== Station layout ==
Sudo Station has one side platform serving a single bi-directional track. The station is unattended.

== Adjacent stations ==
«	Service	»
Gakunan Railway Line
Gakunan-Fujioka	-	Kamiya

== Station history ==
Sudo Station was opened on January 20, 1953.

== Passenger statistics ==
In fiscal 2017, the station was used by an average of 90 passengers daily (boarding passengers only).

== Surrounding area ==
- Nakasato Bus Stop

== See also ==
- List of railway stations in Japan
