= Gakunan-Enoo Station =

Railway station in Fuji, Shizuoka Prefecture, Japan

Gakunan-Enoo Station 岳南江尾駅
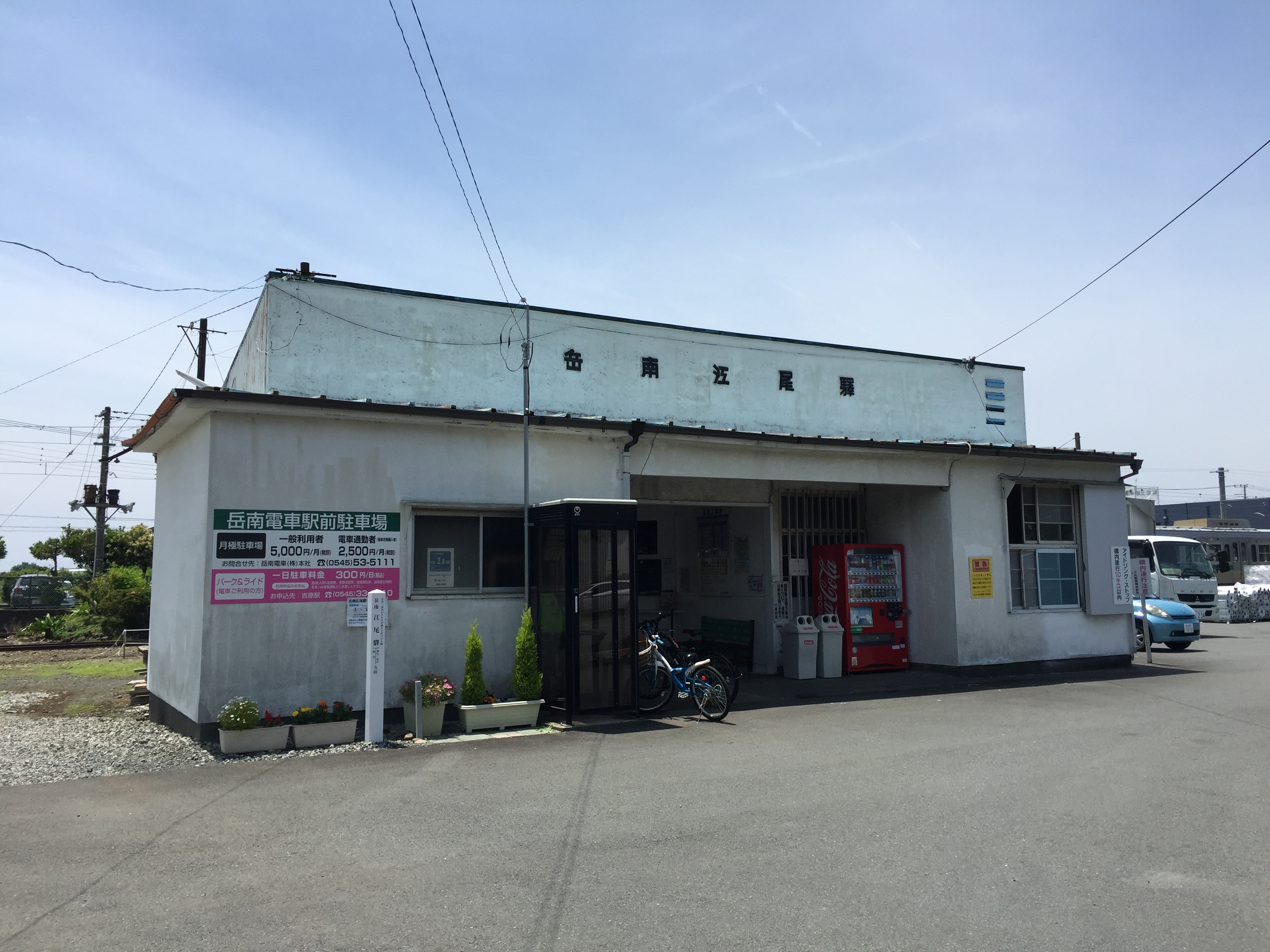
- Gakunan-Enoo Station in June 2016

General information
- Location: Enoo 143-2, Fuji-shi, Shizuoka-ken; Japan
- Coordinates: 35.1553°N 138.7515°E
- Operator: Gakunan Electric Train
- Line: ■ Gakunan Railway Line
- Distance: 9.2 kilometers from Yoshiwara
- Platforms: 1 bay platform

Other information
- Status: Unstaffed

History
- Opened: January 20, 1953

Passengers
- FY2017: 157 daily
Location
- Location within Shizuoka Prefecture Location within Japan

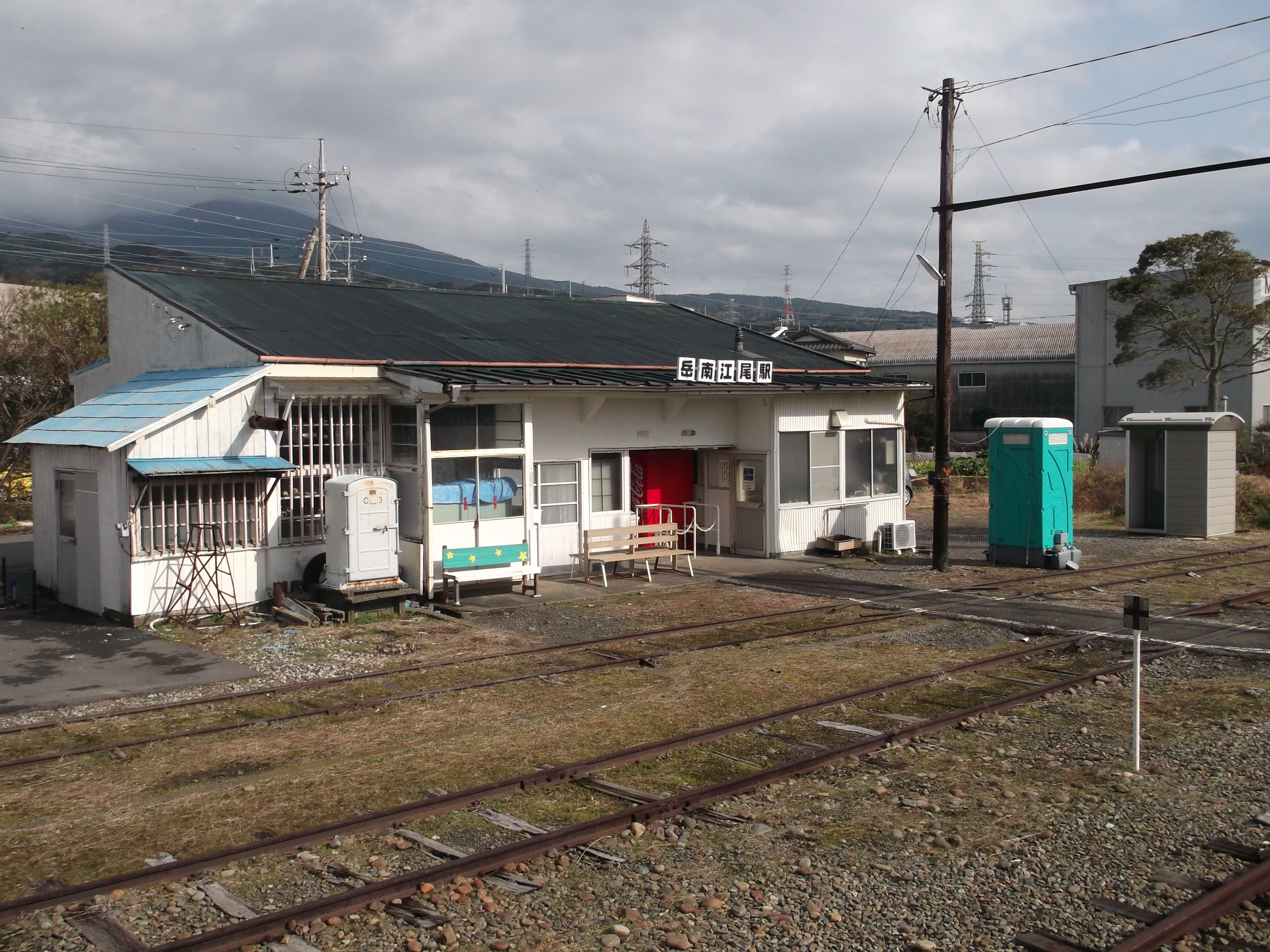
rear view of station building

Gakunan-Enoo Station (岳南江尾駅, Gakunan-Enoo-eki) is a railway station in the city of Fuji, Shizuoka Prefecture, Japan, operated by the private railway operator Gakunan Railway.

== Lines ==
Gakunan-Enoo Station is the terminal station for the Gakunan Railway Line, and is located 9.2 kilometers from the opposing terminal of the line at Yoshiwara.

== Station layout ==
Gakunan-Enoo Station is an unstaffed station with a bay platform serving two tracks. The wooden station building has no ticket machine, and is unattended.

== Adjacent stations ==
| « | Service | » |
Gakunan Railway Line
| Kamiya | - | Terminus |

== Station history ==
Gakunan-Enoo Station was opened on January 20, 1953. Initial plans to extend the Gakunan Line to Numazu were never realized, and the station remains the final terminus of the Gakunan line.

== Passenger statistics ==
In fiscal 2017, the station was used by an average of 157 passengers daily (boarding passengers only).

== Surrounding area ==
The station is located in an isolated industrial area with no stores, houses or even vending machines within close walking distance. The nearest factory is operated by UCC Ueshima Coffee Co.

== See also ==
- List of railway stations in Japan
