= Gakunan-Fujioka Station =

Railway station in Fuji, Shizuoka Prefecture, Japan

Gakunan-Fujioka Station 岳南富士岡駅
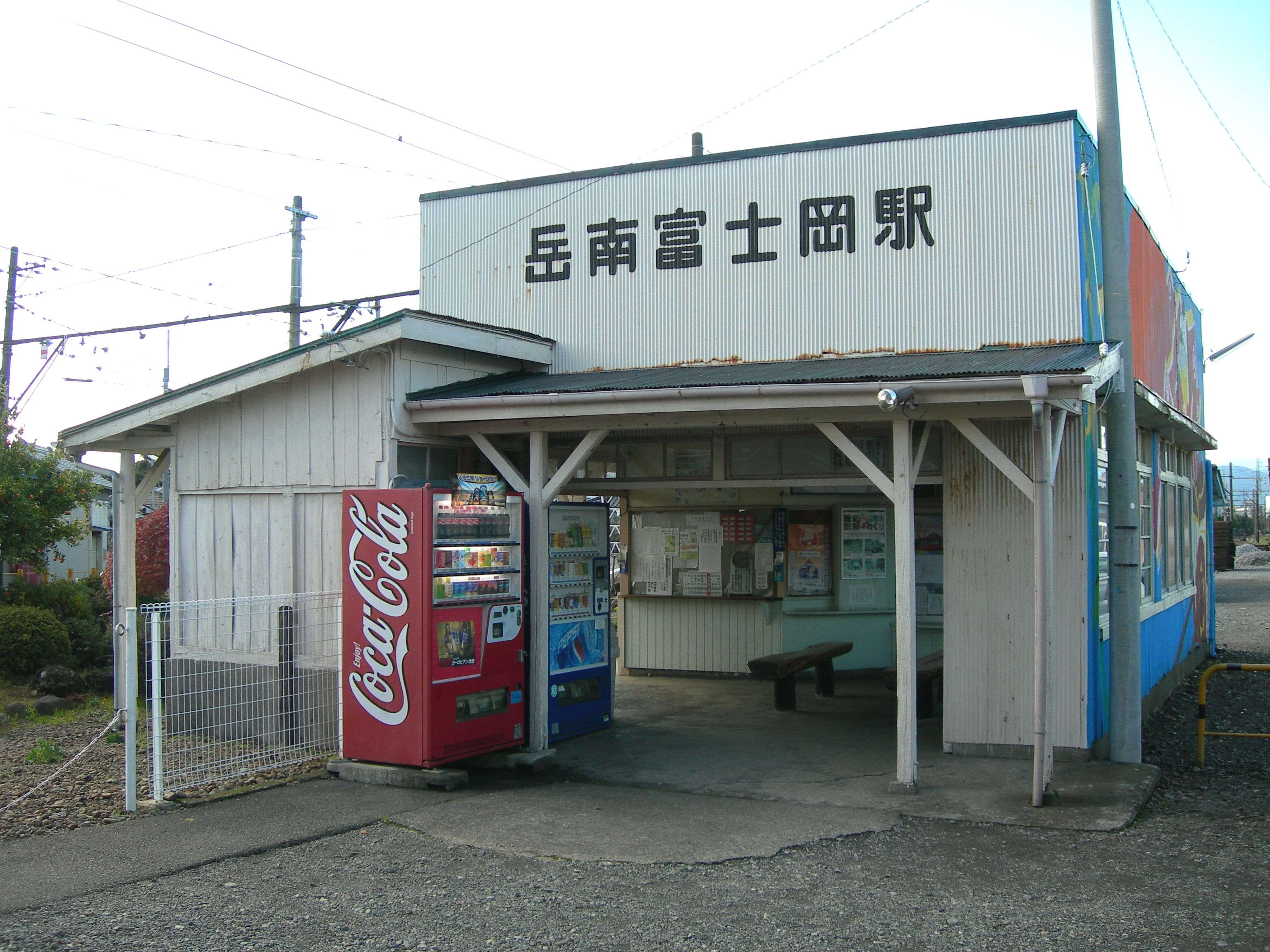
- Gakunan-Fujioka Station

General information
- Location: Fujioka 538-1, Fuji-shi, Shizuoka-ken; Japan
- Coordinates: 35°9′40.11″N 138°43′25.87″E
- Operator: Gakunan Electric Train
- Line: ■ Gakunan Railway Line
- Distance: 6.4 kilometers from Yoshiwara
- Platforms: 1 island platform

Other information
- Status: Unstaffed

History
- Opened: December 20, 1951

Passengers
- FY2017: 311 daily
Location
- Location within Shizuoka Prefecture Location within Japan

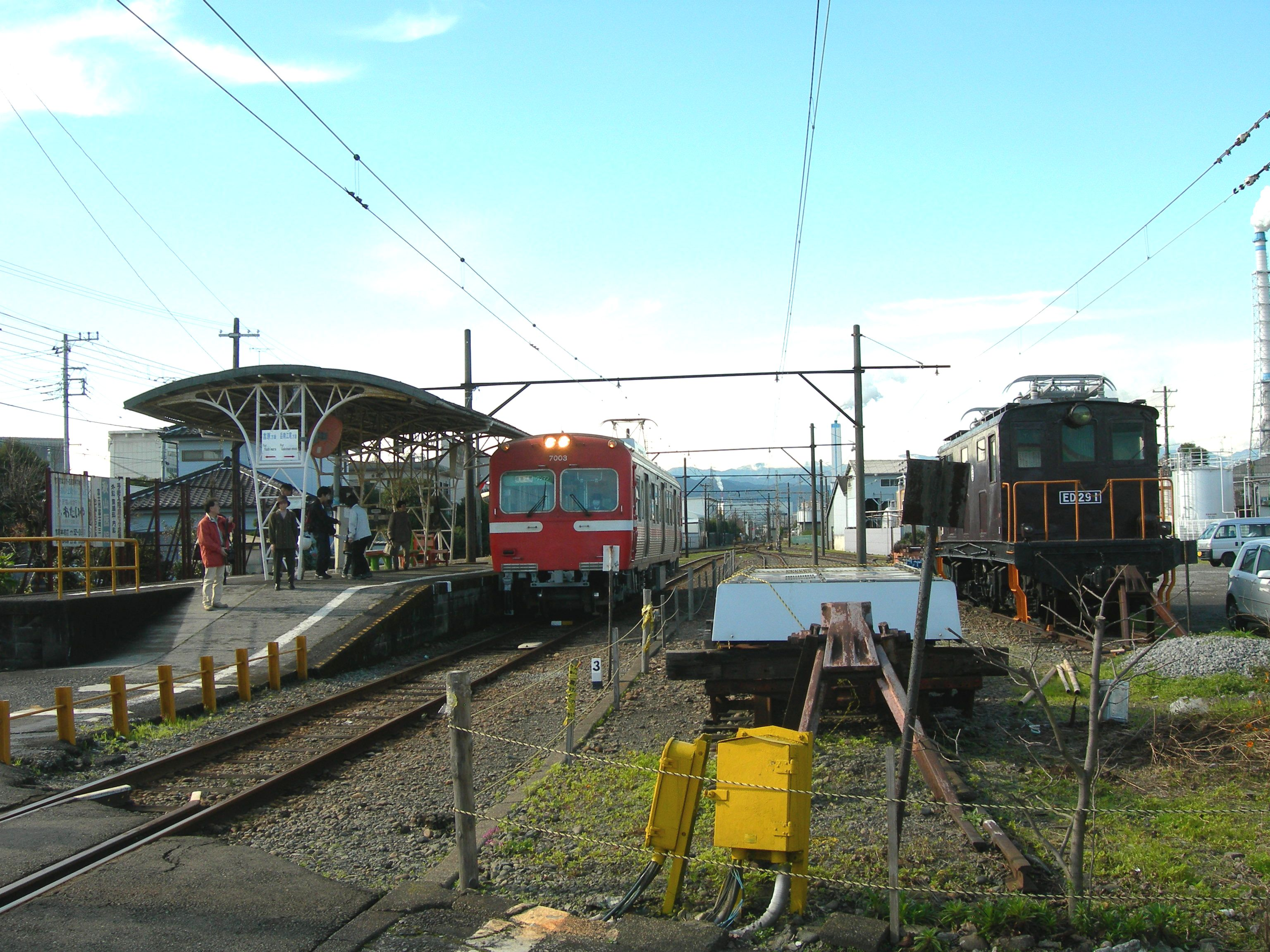
Platform

Gakunan-Fujioka Station (岳南富士岡駅, Gakunan-Fujioka-eki) is a railway station in the city of Fuji, Shizuoka Prefecture, Japan, operated by the private railway operator Gakunan Railway.

== Lines ==
Gakunan-Fujioka Station is served by the Gakunan Railway Line, and is located 6.4 kilometers from the terminal of the line at Yoshiwara.

== Station layout ==
Gakunan-Fujioka Station has one island platform connected to the station building by a level crossing. It is staffed during the morning commute period.

== Adjacent stations ==
«	Service	»
Gakunan Railway Line
Hina	-	Sudo

== Station history ==
Gakunan-Fujioka Station was opened on December 20, 1951.

== Passenger statistics ==
In fiscal 2017, the station was used by an average of 311 passengers daily (boarding passengers only).

== Surrounding area ==
- Fuji High School
- Fuji Yoshinaga No.1 Elementary School
- Fuji Yoshiwara Junior High School
- Fuji City Library

== See also ==
- List of railway stations in Japan
