= Higashi-Tagonoura Station =

Railway station in Fuji, Shizuoka Prefecture, Japan

CA06 Higashi-Tagonoura Station 東田子の浦駅
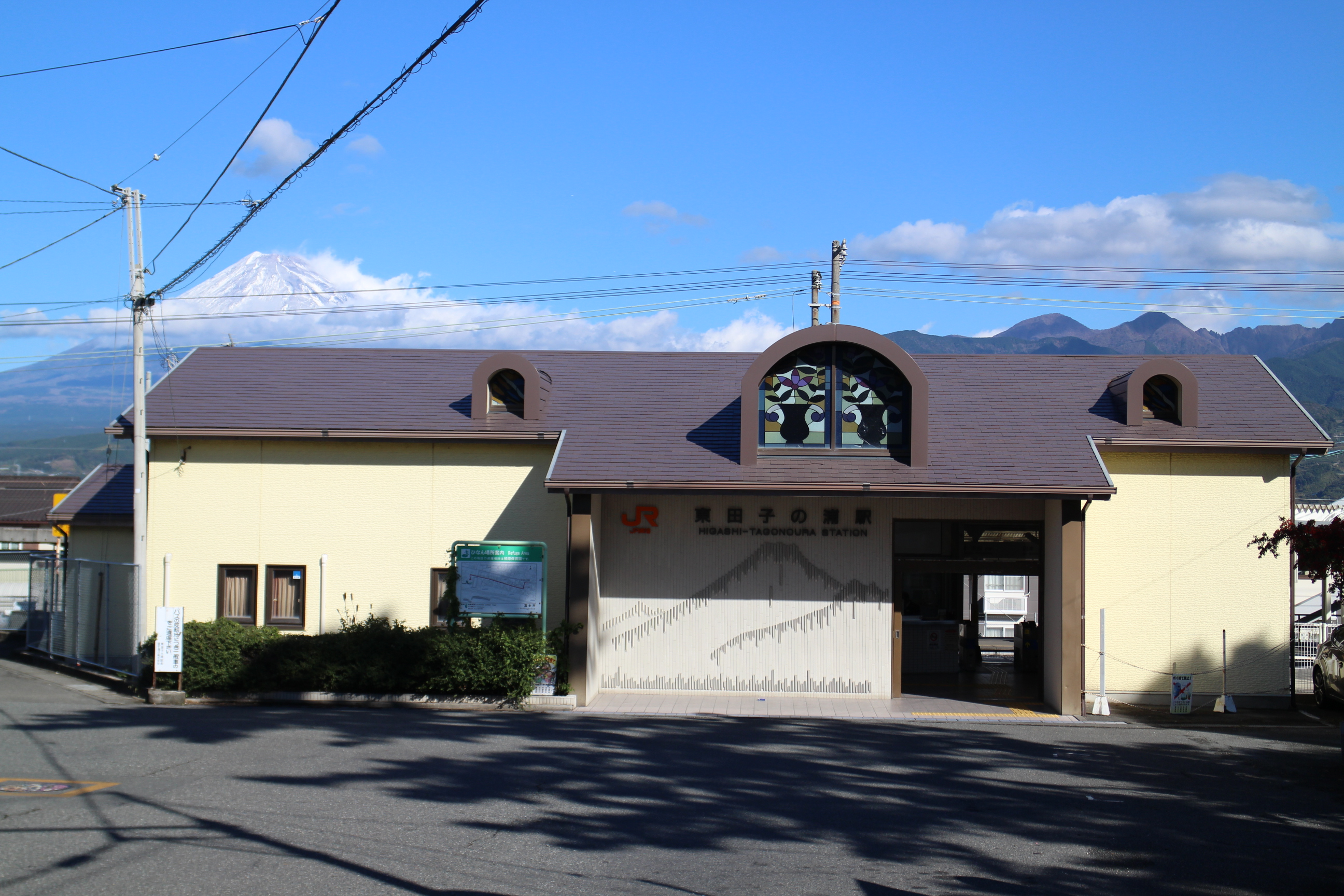
- JR Higashi-Tagonoura Station in November 2017

General information
- Location: Naka-Kashiwabara Shinden 171, Fuji-shi, Shizuoka-ken; Japan
- Coordinates: 35°8′10″N 138°44′43″E
- Operator: JR Central
- Line: Tokaido Main Line
- Distance: 137.4 kilometers from Tokyo
- Platforms: 1 side + 1island platform

Other information
- Status: Staffed

History
- Opened: September 15, 1949

Passengers
- FY2017: 1430 daily
Location
- Location within Shizuoka Prefecture Location within Japan

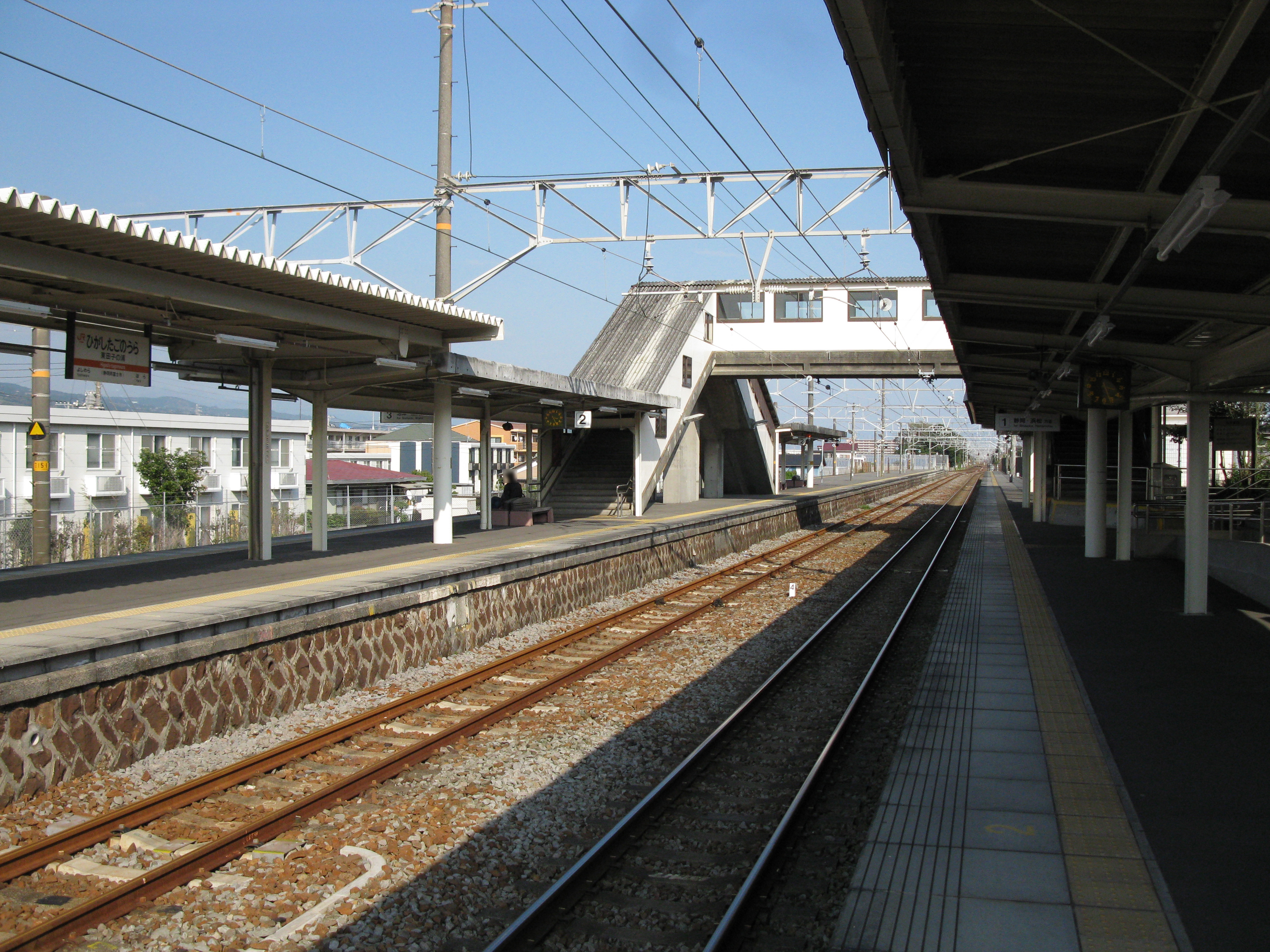
Platforms

Higashi-Tagonoura Station (東田子の浦駅, Higashi-Tagonoura-eki) is a railway station in the city of Fuji, Shizuoka Prefecture, Japan, operated by the Central Japan Railway Company (JR Tōkai ).

== Lines ==
Higashi-Tagonoura Station is served by the JR Tōkai Tōkaidō Main Line, and is located 137.4 kilometers from the official starting point of the line at Tokyo.

== Station layout ==
Higashi-Tagonoura Station has a single side platform serving Track 1 and an island platform serving Track 2 and Track 3, connected to the station building by a footbridge. Track 2 is used for through transit of express trains, as is Track 4 (without platform) to the outside of Track 3. The station is staffed.

=== Platforms ===
| 1 | ■ Tōkaidō Main Line | For Fuji・Shizuoka |
| 2 | ■ Tōkaidō Main Line | For express trains |
| 3 | ■ Tōkaidō Main Line | For Numazu・Mishima・Atami |

== Adjacent stations ==
| « | Service | » |
Central Japan Railway Company
Tōkaidō Main Line CA06
Rapid: Does not stop at this station
| Yoshiwara CA07 | Local | Hara CA05 |

== History ==
Higashi-Tagonoura Station was opened on September 15, 1949, primarily as a commuter station serving workers for nearby heavy industry.

Station numbering was introduced to the section of the Tōkaidō Line operated JR Central in March 2018; Higashi-Tagonoura Station was assigned station number CA06.

== Passenger statistics ==
In fiscal 2017, the station was used by an average of 1430 passengers daily (boarding passengers only).

== Surrounding area ==
- Japan National Route 1

== See also ==
- List of railway stations in Japan
