= Gakunan Railway Line =

Railway line in Shizuoka Prefecture, Japan

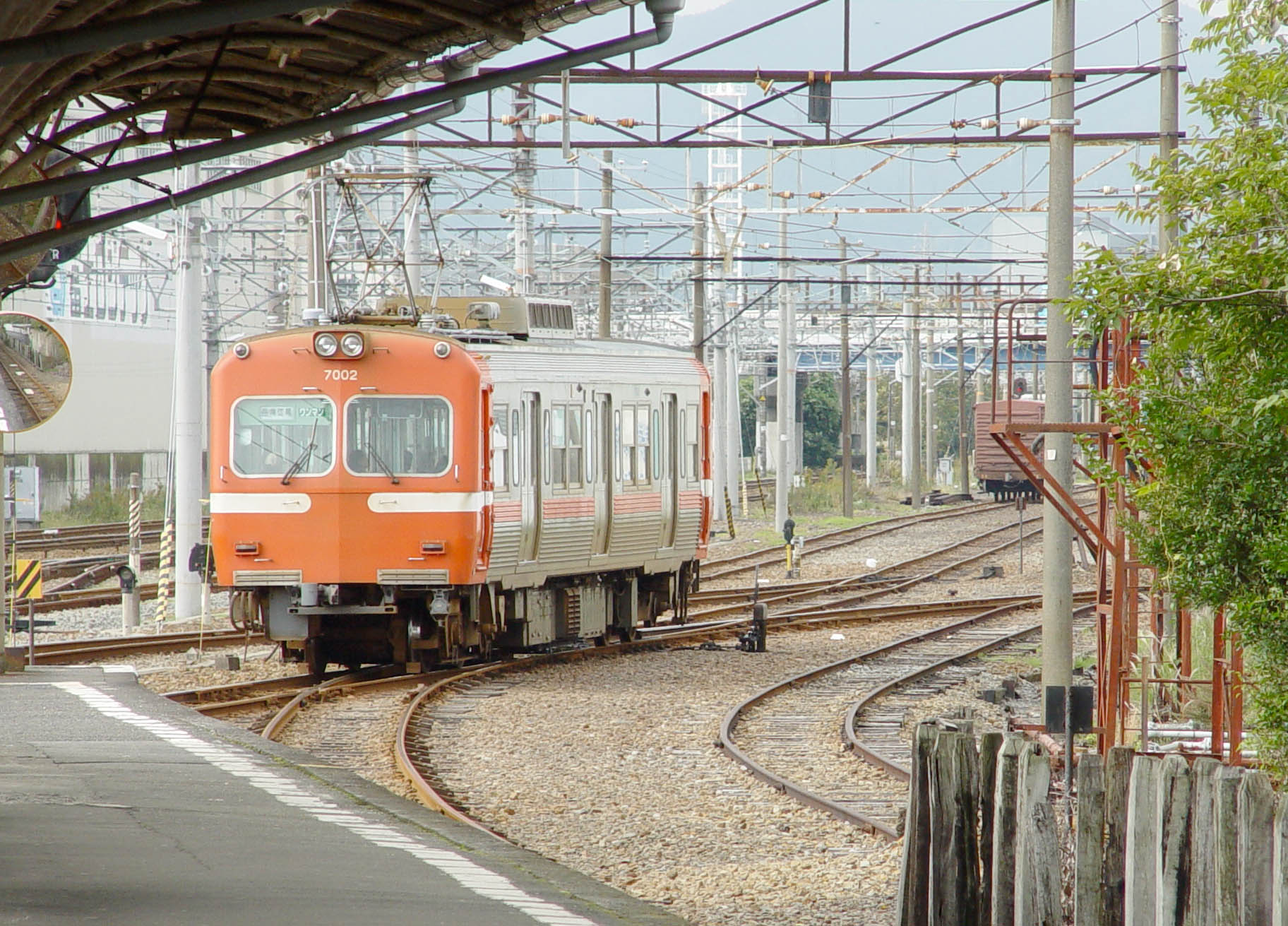
- A Gakunan train at Yoshiwara Station, November 2011

Overview
- Locale: Shizuoka Prefecture
- Termini: Yoshiwara; Gakunan-Enoo
- Stations: 10
- Website: https://www.gakutetsu.jp/

Service
- Type: Heavy rail
- Operator(s): Gakunan Electric Train Co., Ltd.

History
- Opened: 1936; 90 years ago

Technical
- Line length: 9.2 km (5.7 mi)
- Track gauge: 1,067 mm (3 ft 6 in)
- Electrification: 1500 V DC overhead

The Gakunan Railway Line (岳南電車岳南線, Gakunan Densha Gakunan-sen) is a Japanese railway line that runs between Yoshiwara and Gakunan-Enoo Station, all within the industrial area of Fuji, Shizuoka Prefecture. The line has no official name, and is the only line operated by Gakunan Electric Train Co., Ltd. (岳南電車株式会社, Gakunan Densha Kabushiki-gaisha). The company was established on April 1, 2013 as a subsidiary of the former operator Gakunan Railway (岳南鉄道, Gakunan Tetsudō), itself a subsidiary of Fuji Kyuko.

== Stations ==
No.	Station	Japanese	Distance (km)		Transfers	Location
No.	Station	Japanese	Between stations	Total	Transfers	Location
GD01	Yoshiwara	吉原	–	0.0	Tōkaidō Main Line	Fuji, Shizuoka Prefecture
GD02	Jatco Mae	ジヤトコ前	2.3	2.3		Fuji, Shizuoka Prefecture
GD03	Yoshiwara-honchō	吉原本町	0.4	2.7		Fuji, Shizuoka Prefecture
GD04	Hon-Yoshiwara	本吉原	0.3	3.0		Fuji, Shizuoka Prefecture
GD05	Gakunan-Harada	岳南原田	1.4	4.4		Fuji, Shizuoka Prefecture
GD06	Hina	比奈	1.0	5.4		Fuji, Shizuoka Prefecture
GD07	Gakunan-Fujioka	岳南富士岡	1.0	6.4		Fuji, Shizuoka Prefecture
GD08	Sudo	須津	0.9	7.3		Fuji, Shizuoka Prefecture
GD09	Kamiya	神谷	0.9	8.2		Fuji, Shizuoka Prefecture
GD10	Gakunan-Enoo	岳南江尾	1.0	9.2		Fuji, Shizuoka Prefecture

== History ==
The Gakunan Railway began operations as an industrial railway named the Nissan Heavy Industrial Railroad (日産重工業専用鉄道, Nissan Jūkōgyō Senyō Tetsudō) on August 5, 1936 as part of a project to create an industrial center in Fuji city. The terminal station of the line was established at Yoshiwara Station on the Tokaido Main Line, and initial plans called for the line to be extended as far as Numazu Station. These plans were delayed by World War II and were eventually cancelled with the end of the war and breakup of the Nissan zaibatsu. The line gained its present name on December 15, 1948, after which regularly scheduled passenger service began. The electric supply for the line was upgraded from 600 Volts to the present 1,500 volts in 1969. In 1984, scheduled freight services past Sudo were discontinued.

All freight services were discontinued on March 16, 2012.

== Rolling stock ==
- 7000 series
- 8000 series
- 9000 series

=== Removed trains ===
- 5000 series(Formerly Tokyu 5000 Series) - Withdrew in 1998 and demolished in 2008

=== Future plans ===
In 2026, this company will purchase used car 2-car(one set) which has VVVF. In 2027, this company will purchase used car 1-car(2 sets) which has VVVF. And, these trains will replace 8000 series 2-car and 7000 series 1-car in 2027 and 2028 respectively. But, it will be late to replace 7000 series, because Gakunan Railway doesn't get alternative trains.

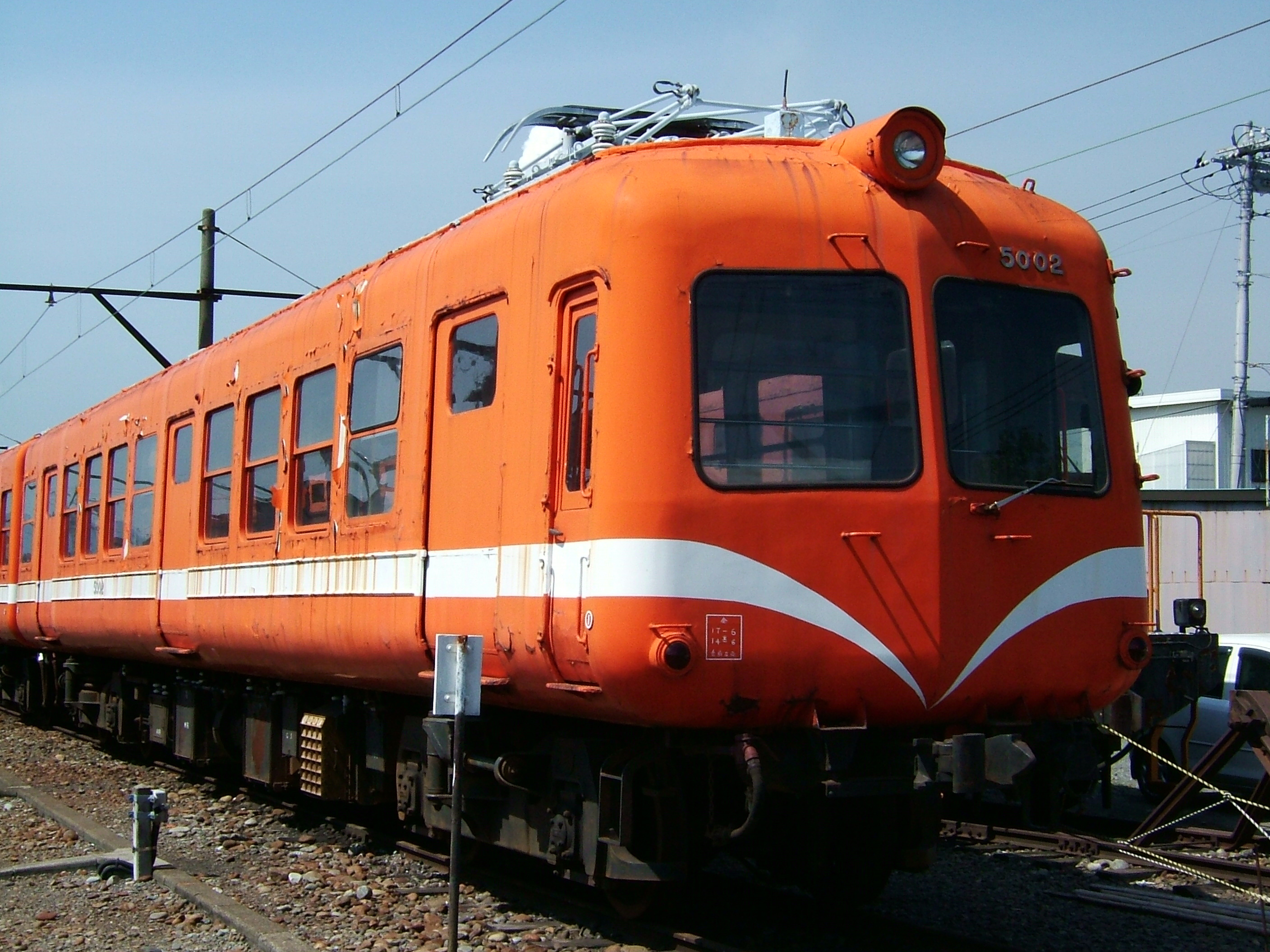
5000 series

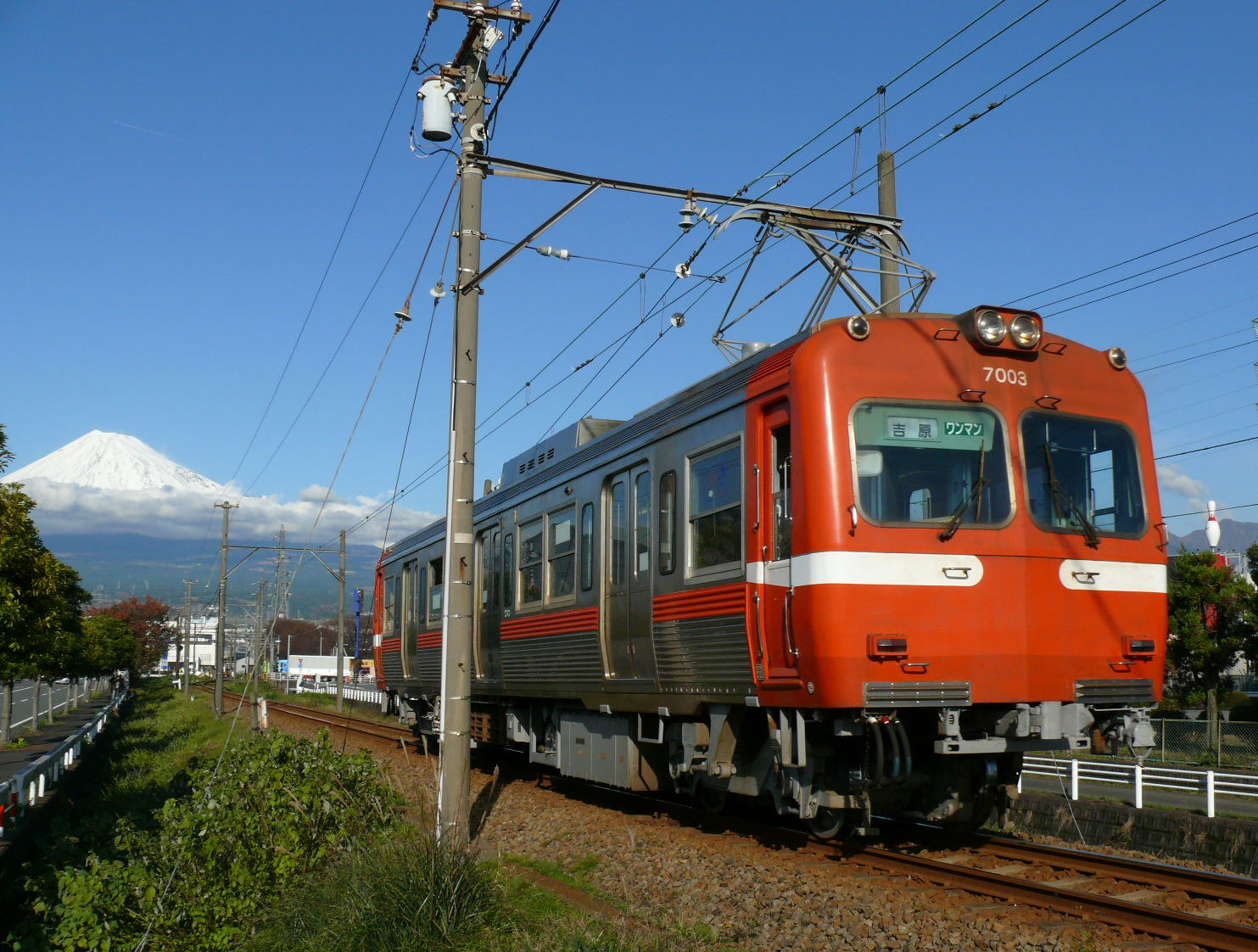
7000 series

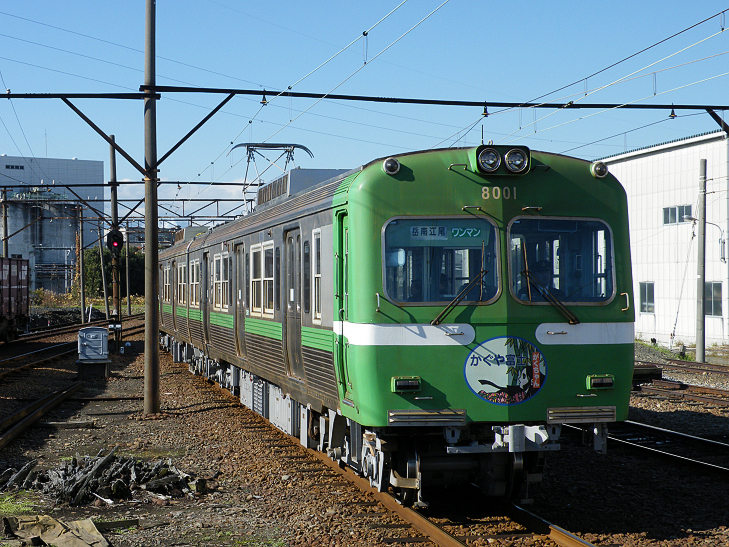
8000 series

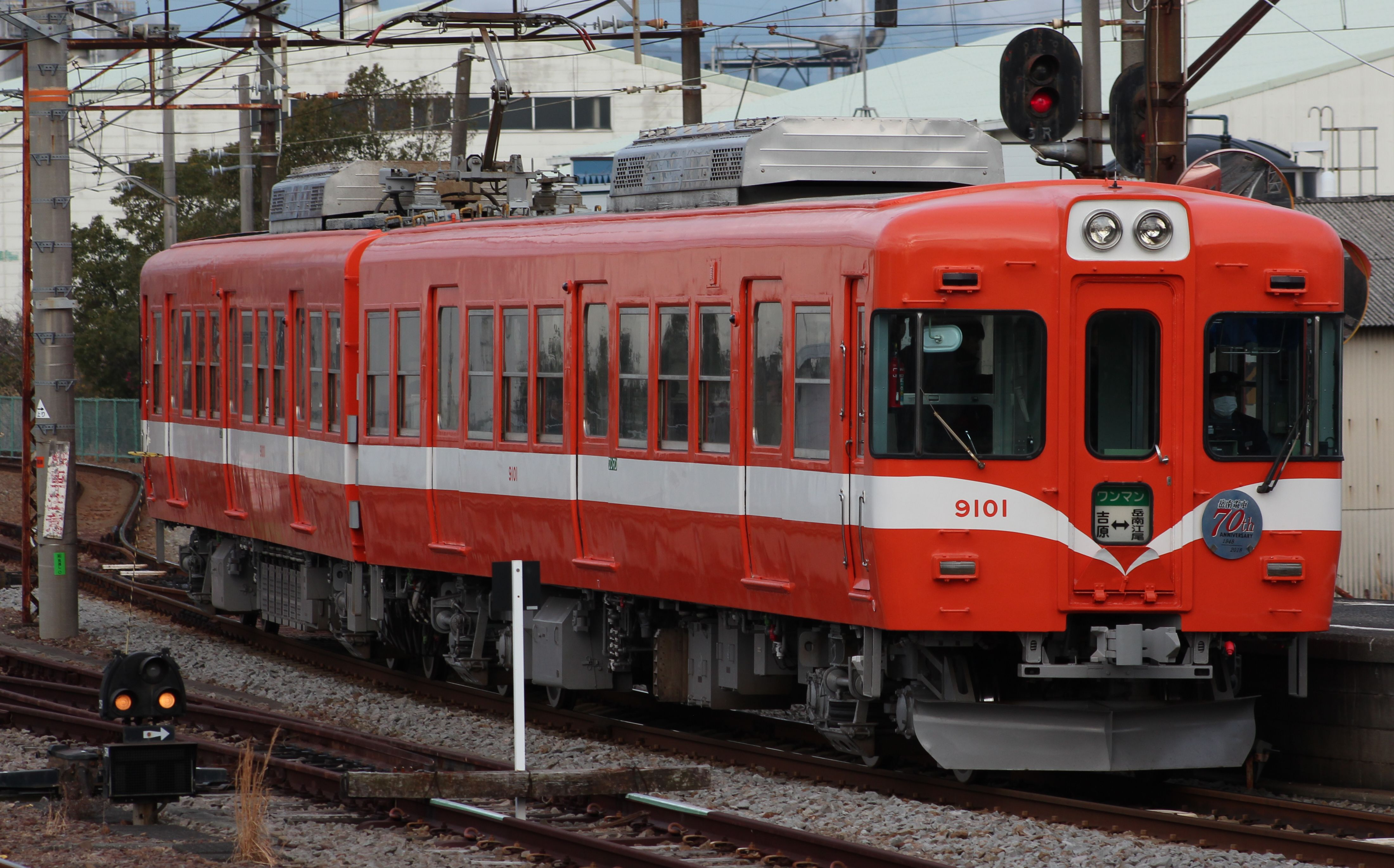
9000 series
