= Fuji, Shizuoka =

Fuji 富士市
- Special city
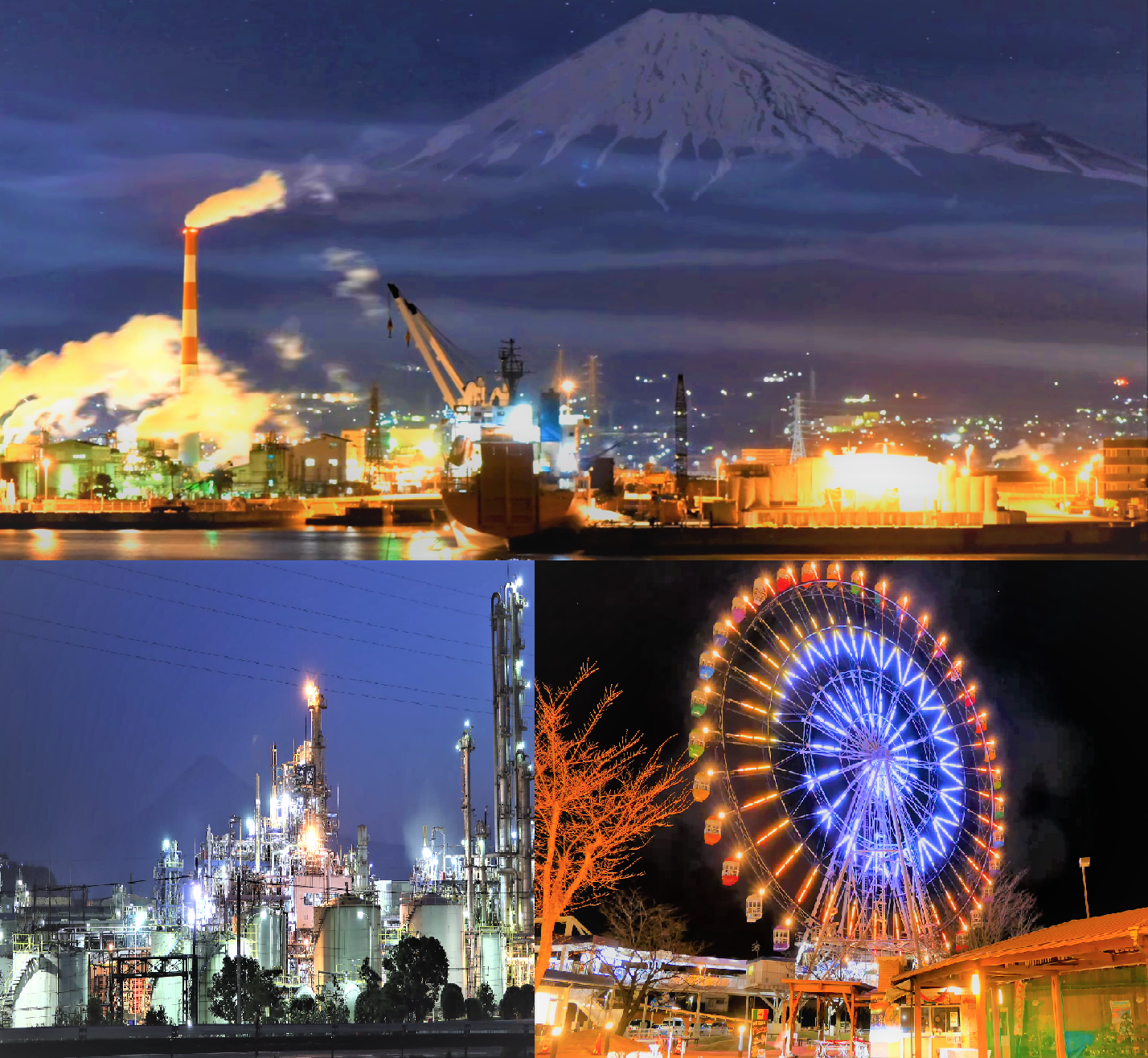
- Factories and Mount Fuji

- Flag Seal
- Interactive map of Fuji
- Coordinates: 35°9′40.8″N 138°40′34.6″E
- Country: Japan
- Region: Chūbu (Tōkai)
- Prefecture: Shizuoka
- As Yoshiwara town settled: April 1, 1889
- As Fuji town settled: August 1, 1929
- former Fuji city settled: March 31, 1954
- After mergered and current city settled: November 1, 1966

Government
  - Mayor: Yūki Kanezashi (金指祐樹) - from January 2026

Area
  - Total: 244.95 km^{2} (94.58 sq mi)

Population (December 1, 2019)
  - Total: 245,015
  - Density: 1,000.3/km^{2} (2,590.7/sq mi)
- Time zone: UTC+9 (Japan Standard Time)
- Phone number: 0545-51-0123
- Address: 1-100 Nagatachō, Fuji-shi, Shizuoka-ken 417-8601
- Climate: Cfa
- Website: Official website
- Symbols
- Flower: Rose
- Tree: Camphor laurel

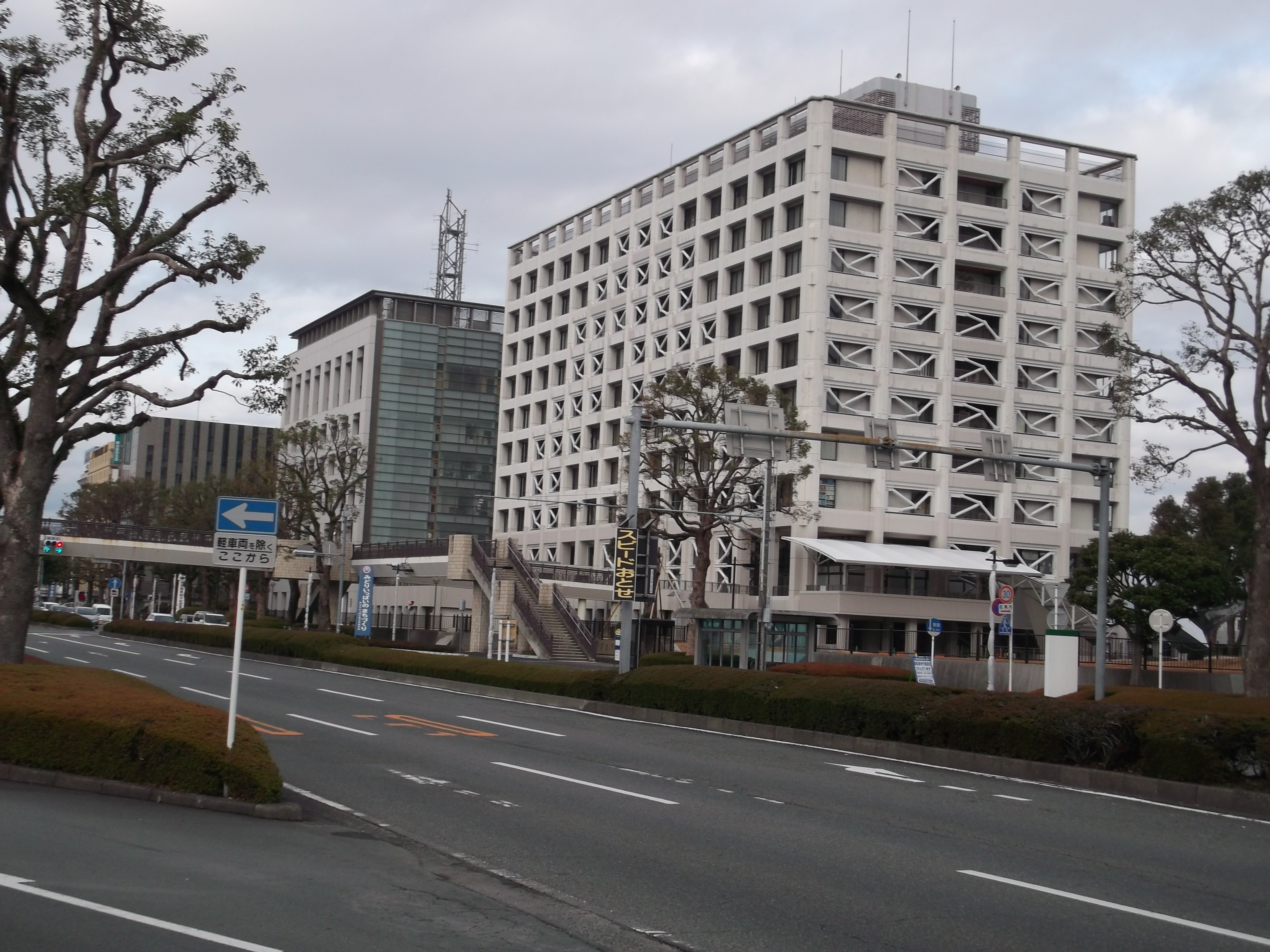
Fuji City Hall

Fuji (富士市, Fuji-shi; Japanese pronunciation: [ɸɯꜜ.(d)ʑi, ɸɯ.(d)ʑiꜜ.ɕi]) is a city in eastern Shizuoka Prefecture, Japan. As of 1 December 2019, the city had an estimated population of 245,015 in 106,087 households, and a population density of 1,000 people per km^{2}. The total area of the city is 244.95 square kilometers (94.58 sq mi). Fuji is the third largest city in terms of population in Shizuoka Prefecture, trailing Hamamatsu and Shizuoka.

== Geography ==
Located on the banks of the Fuji River, most of the city of Fuji enjoys good views of Mount Fuji, part of whose summit is within the city borders. The city is bordered to the south by Suruga Bay on the Pacific Ocean.

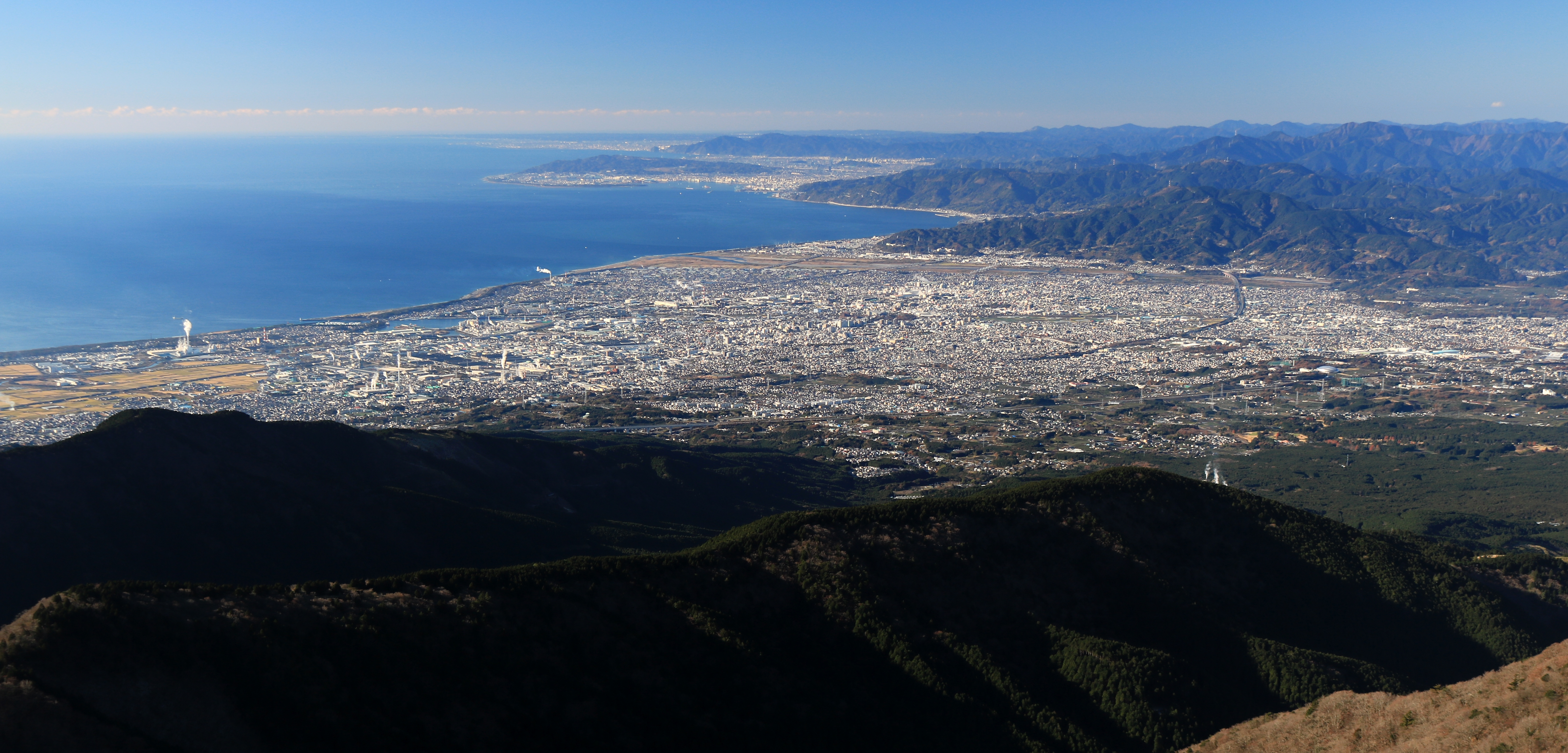
Fuji city and Suruga Bay from Ashitaka Mountains

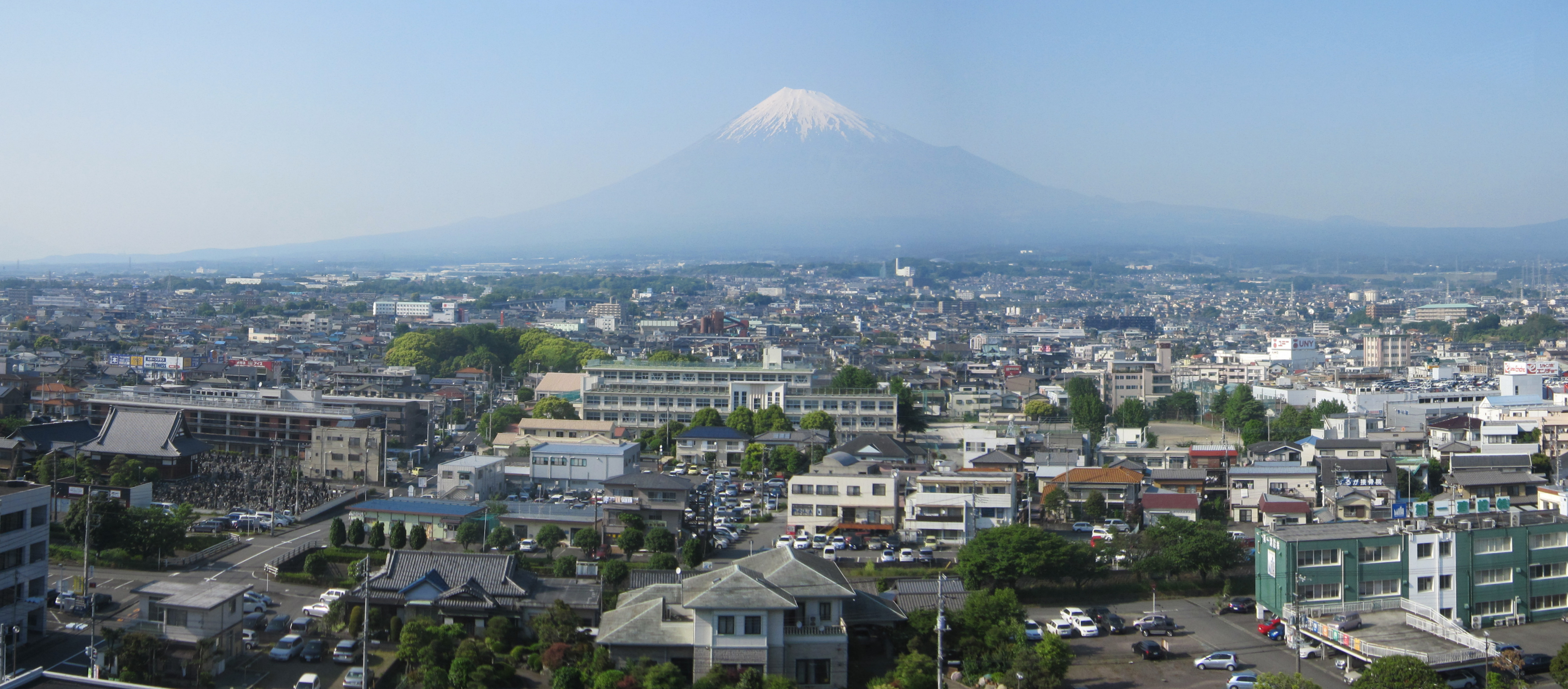
Fuji City and Mount Fuji seen from city hall

=== Surrounding municipalities ===
- Shizuoka Prefecture
  - Fujinomiya
  - Gotemba
  - Nagaizumi
  - Numazu
  - Shimizu-ku, Shizuoka
  - Susono

=== Demographics ===
Per Japanese census data, the population of Fuji has grown rapidly over the past 50 years.

Historical population
Year	Pop.	±%
1960	155,780	—
1970	195,598	+25.6%
1980	222,480	+13.7%
1990	239,963	+7.9%
2000	251,559	+4.8%
2010	254,049	+1.0%

=== Climate ===
The city has a climate characterized by hot and humid summers, and relatively mild winters (Köppen climate classification Cfa). The average annual temperature in Fuji is 16.2 °C (61.2 °F). The average annual rainfall is 2,159.1 millimetres (85.00 in) with September as the wettest month. The temperatures are highest on average in August, at around 27.0 °C (80.6 °F), and lowest in January, at around 5.8 °C (42.4 °F).

Climate data for Fuji (1991−2020 normals, extremes 1978−present)
Month	Jan	Feb	Mar	Apr	May	Jun	Jul	Aug	Sep	Oct	Nov	Dec	Year
Record high °C (°F)	20.5 (68.9)	23.8 (74.8)	27.0 (80.6)	27.7 (81.9)	30.7 (87.3)	34.2 (93.6)	36.9 (98.4)	36.6 (97.9)	35.5 (95.9)	32.1 (89.8)	26.5 (79.7)	24.2 (75.6)	36.9 (98.4)
Mean daily maximum °C (°F)	11.2 (52.2)	12.0 (53.6)	14.8 (58.6)	19.3 (66.7)	23.2 (73.8)	25.7 (78.3)	29.1 (84.4)	31.0 (87.8)	28.2 (82.8)	23.3 (73.9)	18.4 (65.1)	13.6 (56.5)	20.8 (69.5)
Daily mean °C (°F)	5.8 (42.4)	6.8 (44.2)	9.9 (49.8)	14.5 (58.1)	18.8 (65.8)	22.0 (71.6)	25.5 (77.9)	27.0 (80.6)	24.0 (75.2)	18.7 (65.7)	13.3 (55.9)	8.2 (46.8)	16.2 (61.2)
Mean daily minimum °C (°F)	1.4 (34.5)	2.2 (36.0)	5.3 (41.5)	10.0 (50.0)	14.7 (58.5)	18.9 (66.0)	22.8 (73.0)	23.9 (75.0)	20.6 (69.1)	14.9 (58.8)	9.1 (48.4)	3.8 (38.8)	12.3 (54.1)
Record low °C (°F)	−6.8 (19.8)	−7.5 (18.5)	−5.2 (22.6)	−0.2 (31.6)	5.8 (42.4)	11.4 (52.5)	14.1 (57.4)	17.3 (63.1)	10.5 (50.9)	4.8 (40.6)	−0.2 (31.6)	−4.8 (23.4)	−7.5 (18.5)
Average precipitation mm (inches)	76.8 (3.02)	95.4 (3.76)	193.4 (7.61)	194.2 (7.65)	195.3 (7.69)	227.1 (8.94)	255.5 (10.06)	187.3 (7.37)	273.3 (10.76)	240.8 (9.48)	138.4 (5.45)	81.7 (3.22)	2,159.1 (85.00)
Average precipitation days (≥ 1.0 mm)	5.6	6.4	10.7	9.9	10.8	12.9	12.4	10.1	12.0	10.3	7.7	5.8	114.6
Mean monthly sunshine hours	199.6	177.9	178.4	183.5	175.4	115.5	119.1	169.3	146.7	153.2	166.6	192.4	1,977.5
Source: Japan Meteorological Agency

== History ==
In the Edo period, the Tōkaidō passed through the area that is now Fuji, with a post station at Yoshiwara-juku. During the Edo period, the area was mostly tenryō territory under direct control of the Tokugawa shogunate. With the establishment of the modern municipalities system of the early Meiji period in 1889, the area was reorganized into the town of Yoshiwara (吉原町) and the villages of Shimada (島田村) Denbō (伝法村), Imaizumi (今泉村), Motoyoshiwara (元吉原村), Sudo (須津村), Yoshinaga (吉永村), Harada (原田村), Ōbuchi (大淵村), Kajima (加島村), Tagoura (田子浦村), Iwamatsu (岩松村), and Takaoka (鷹岡村) within Fuji District.

Kajima became the town of Fuji on August 1, 1929. Neighboring Takaoka was elevated to town status on January 1, 1933. Shimada merged into Yoshiwara in 1940, Denbō in 1941, and Imaizumi in 1942. Yoshiwara was elevated to city status on April 1, 1948, the city expanded through annexation of Motoyoshiwara, Sudo, Yoshinaga, and Harada villages in 1955 and Ōbuchi in 1956.

Tagoura and Iwamatsu merged with Fuji to form the city of Fuji on March 31, 1954. The city expanded through annexation of neighboring Ukijima and San area from Hara, Suntō District in 1956.

On November 1, 1966, Fuji and Yoshiwara merged with Takaoka to form the new city of Fuji, which attained the status of a Special City on April 1, 2001, with greater autonomy from the central government.

On November 1, 2008, the town of Fujikawa (from Ihara District) was merged with Fuji.

== Government ==
Fuji has a mayor-council form of government with a directly elected mayor and a unicameral city legislature of 32 members. The city contributes five members to the Shizuoka Prefectural Assembly. In terms of national politics, the city is divided between Shizuoka 3rd District and Shizuoka 4th District in the lower house of the Japanese Diet.

== Economy ==
Fuji is one of the major industrial centers of Shizuoka Prefecture, and the city has hosted numerous paper factories including Nippon Paper Industries (former Daishowa Paper Industries) and Oji Paper Company since the Meiji period. Other industries include food processing, metals and transportation equipment. Automobile parts manufacturer Jatco is headquartered in Fuji. Agriculture in the area is concentrated on green tea production and horticulture.

== Education ==
Fuji has 27 public elementary schools and 16 public Junior high school operated by the city government. The city has four public high schools operated by the Shizuoka Prefectural Board of Education and one public high school operated by the city government. The city has one private high school and one private combined middle/high school. In addition, the prefecture operates one special education school for the disabled.

The city has one international school (Escola Fuji), a Brazilian primary school

In addition, Shizuoka-based Tokoha University has a secondary campus in Fuji.

The city has one public and four private vocational education schools, including the privately operated Fuji Rehabilitation Institute.

== Transport ==
=== Railways ===
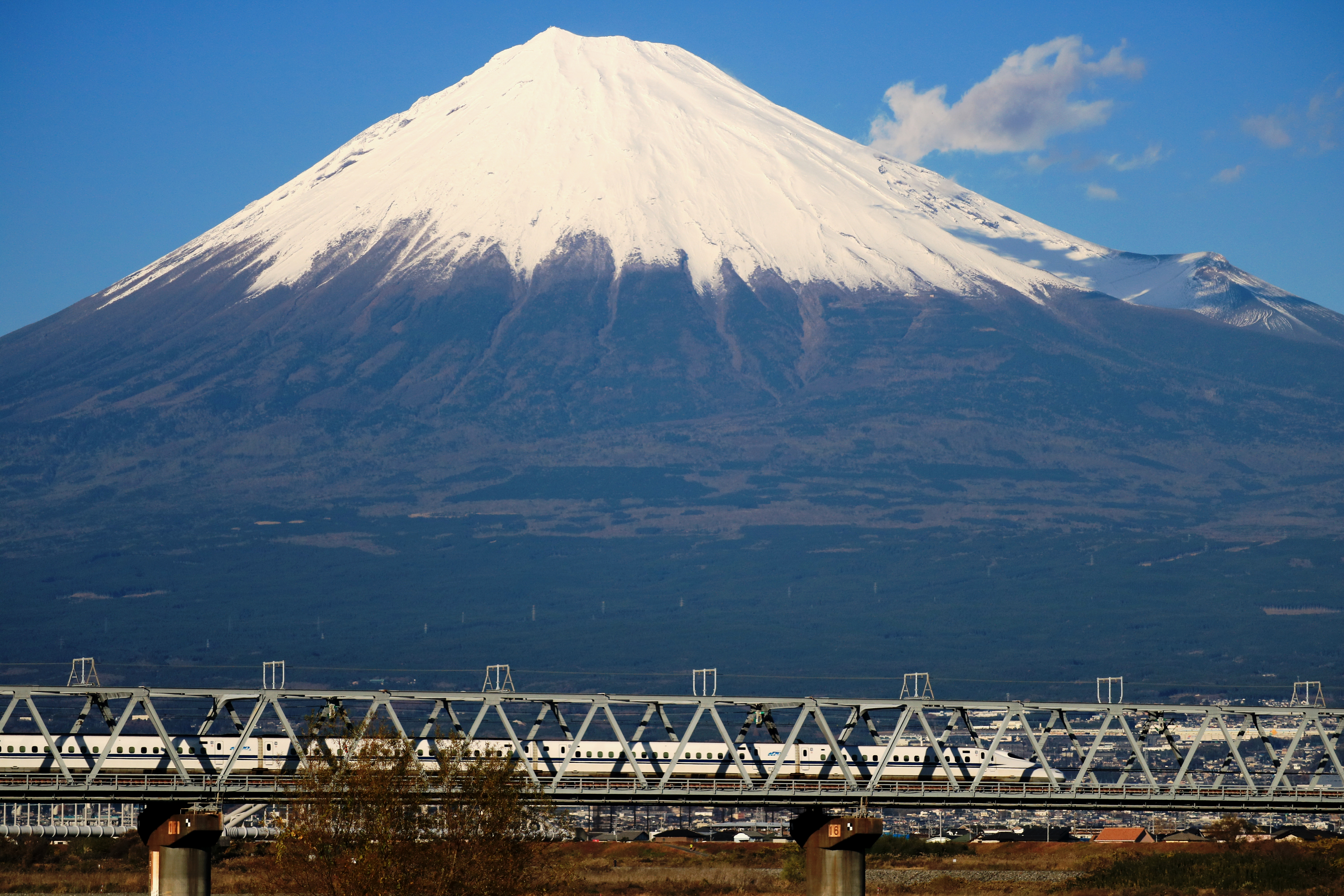
Fujikawa Bridge of Tōkaidō Shinkansen (JR Central) over Fuji River and Mount Fuji

- Central Japan Railway Company - Tōkaidō Shinkansen
  - Shin-Fuji
- Central Japan Railway Company - Tōkaidō Main Line
  - Higashi-Tagonoura - Yoshiwara - Fuji - Fujikawa
- Central Japan Railway Company - Minobu Line
  - Fuji Station - Yunoki - Tatebori - Iriyamase - Fujine
- Gakunan Railway Line
  - Yoshiwara - Jatco-mae - Yoshiwara-honchō - Hon-Yoshiwara - Gakunan-Harada - Hina - Gakunan-Fujioka - Sudo - Kamiya - Gakunan-Enoo

=== Highways ===
- Tōmei Expressway
- Shin-Tōmei Expressway
- Nishi-Fuji Road
- National Route 1
- National Route 139
- National Route 469

=== Ports ===
- Tagonoura Port

== Local attractions ==
- Sengen Kofun, a National Historic Site

=== Festivals ===
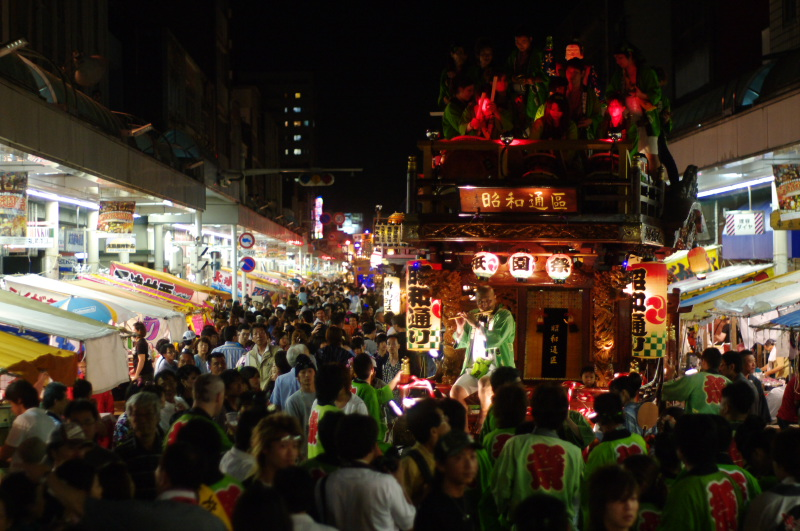
Yoshihara Gion Festival

- The Bishamonten Festival is one of the three big Daruma festivals in Japan.
- The Yoshiwara Gion Festival is held on the second Saturday and Sunday of June.
- The Fuji Festival is held on the fourth Saturday of July.
- The Karigane Festival is held on the first Saturday of October.
- The Fuji Shibazakura Festival

== Notable people from Fuji ==
- Nichiji - Japanese Buddhist monk
- Urara Ashikawa - professional artistic gymnast
- Yoshikatsu Kawaguchi - professional soccer player
- Takuro Kikuoka - professional soccer player
- Daigo Kobayashi - professional soccer player
- Shuji Kondo - professional wrestler
- Makoto Oishi - professional wrestler
- Yukihiko Sato - professional soccer player
- Hiroyuki Shirai - professional soccer player
- Mitsuru Sugaya - manga artist
- Miyu Takahira - professional soccer player
- Tatsuya Tsuruta - professional soccer player
- Yoji Totsuka - scientist

== Sister cities ==
- Oceanside, California, United States
