= Jatco Mae Station =

Railway station in Fuji, Shizuoka Prefecture, Japan

Jatco Mae Station ジヤトコ前駅
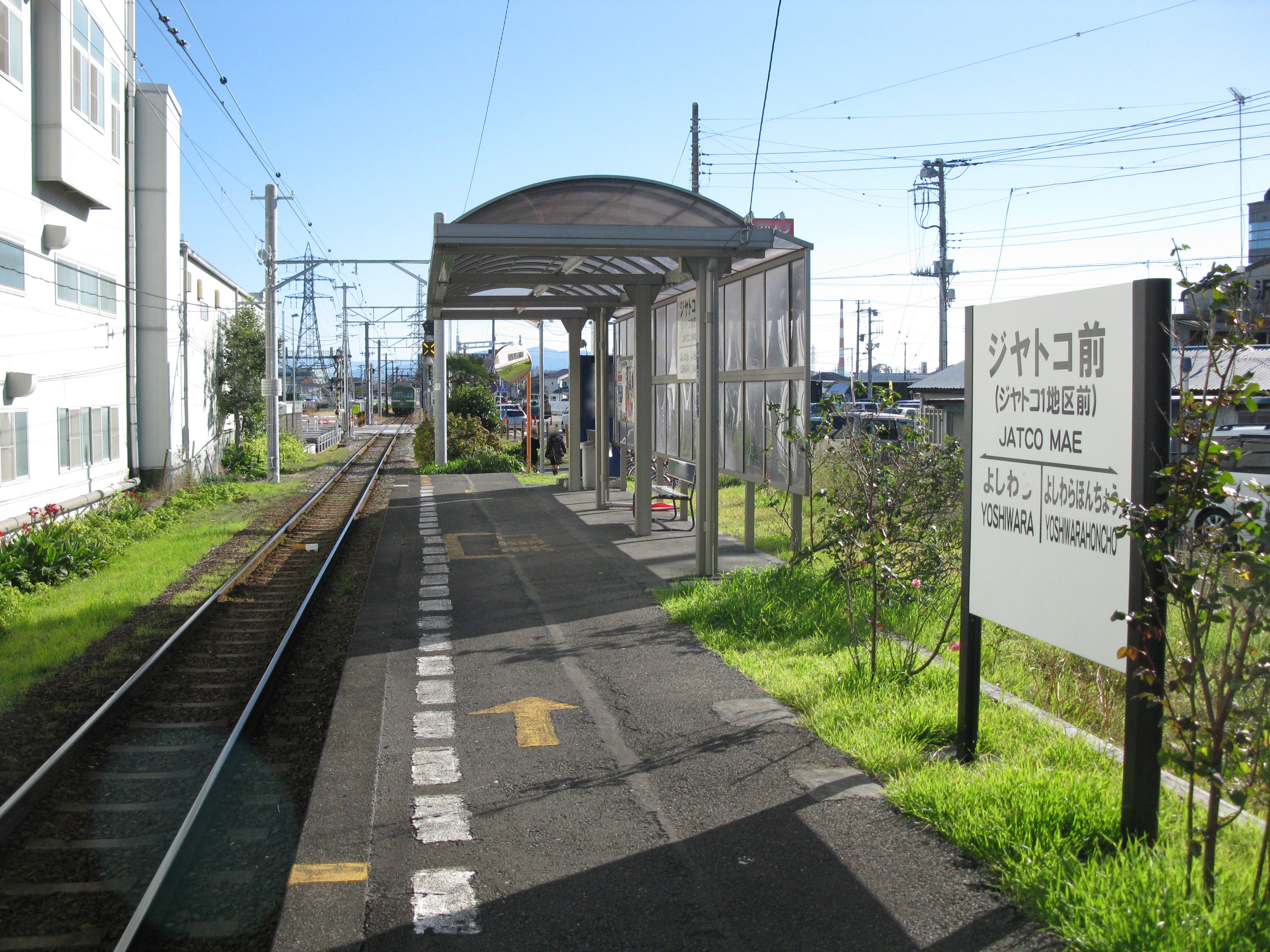
- Jatco Mae Station in December 2010

General information
- Location: Denpō 3653-2, Fuji-shi, Shizuoka-ken; Japan
- Coordinates: 35.157729°N 138.690044°E
- Operator: Gakunan Electric Train
- Line: ■ Gakunan Railway Line
- Distance: 2.3 kilometers from Yoshiwara
- Platforms: 1 side platform

Other information
- Status: Unstaffed

History
- Opened: November 18, 1949
- Former names: Nissan-mae (until 2005)

Passengers
- FY2017: 115 daily
Location
- Location within Shizuoka Prefecture Location within Japan

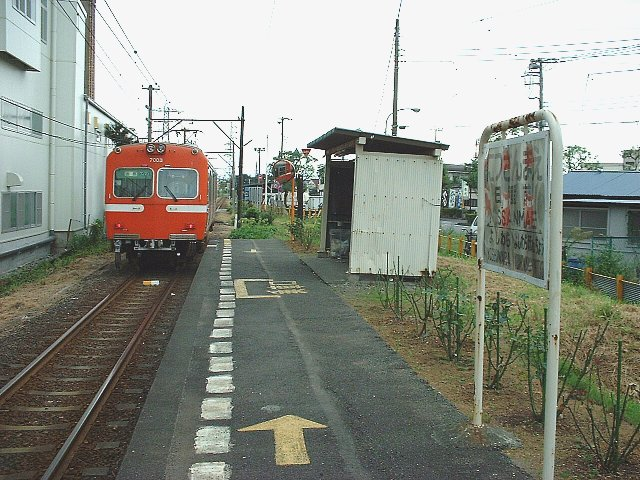
Platform

Jatco Mae Station (ジヤトコ前駅, Jiyatoko-mae-eki), is a train station in the city of Fuji, Shizuoka Prefecture, Japan, operated by the private railway operator Gakunan Railway. It is named after the nearby JATCO plant.

== Lines ==
Jatco Mae Station is served by the Gakunan Railway Line, and is located 2.3 kilometers from the terminal of the line at Yoshiwara.

== Station layout ==
Jatco Mae Station has one side platform serving a single bi-directional track. There is no station building and the station is unattended.

== Adjacent stations ==
«	Service	»
Gakunan Railway Line
Yoshiwara	-	Yoshiwara-honchō

== Station history ==
Jatco Mae Station was opened on November 18, 1949 as Nissan-mae Station (日産前駅, Nissanmae-eki) after the large Nissan Motors Fuji assembly plant located nearby. The plant was sold in June 1999 to the Nissan subsidiary Jatco, and the station was accordingly renamed on April 1, 2005.

== Passenger statistics ==
In fiscal 2017, the station was used by an average of 115 passengers daily (boarding passengers only).

== Surrounding area ==
- JATCO

== See also ==
- List of railway stations in Japan
