= Yoshiwara Station =

Railway station in Fuji, Shizuoka Prefecture, Japan

CA07 Yoshiwara Station 吉原駅
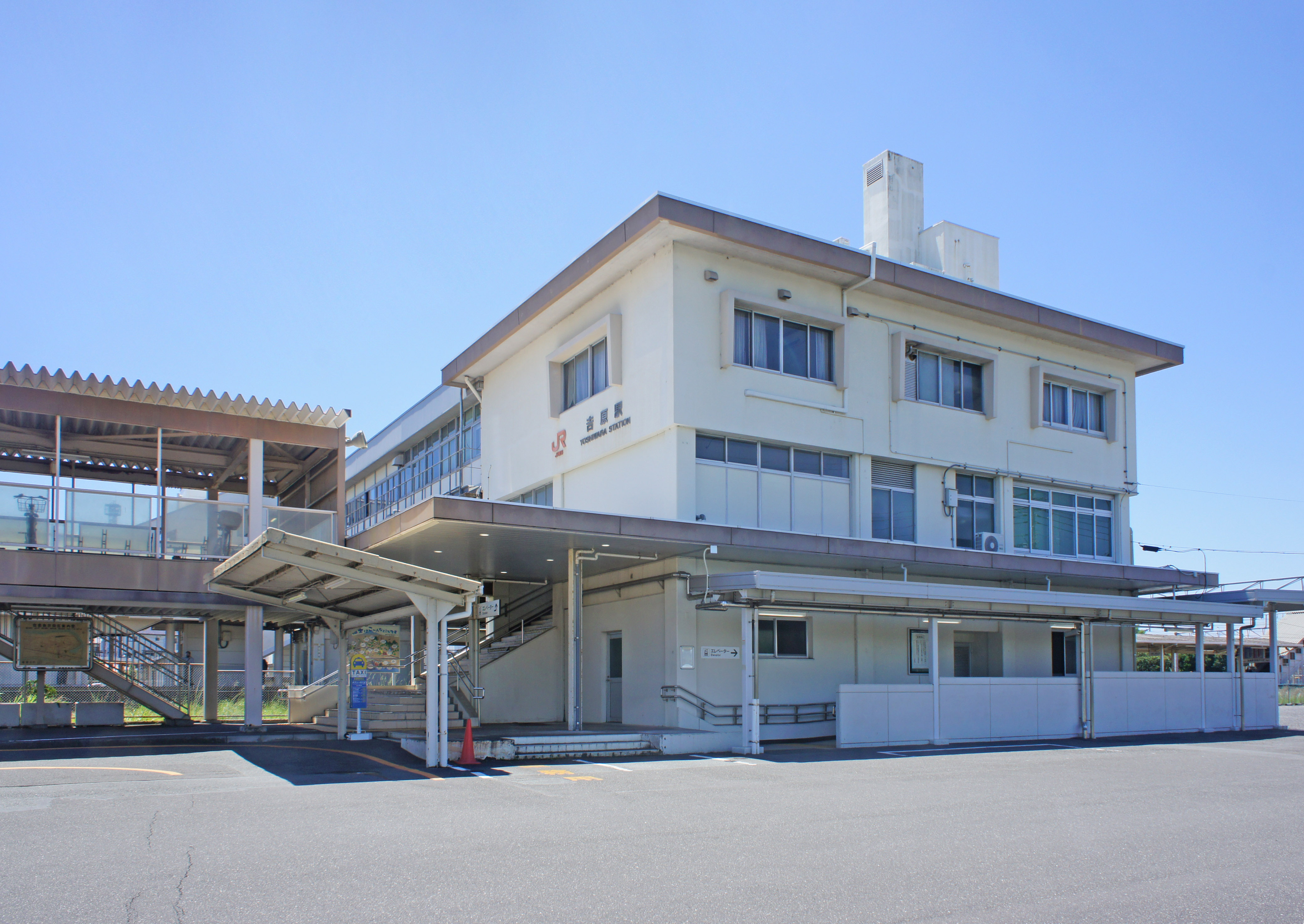
- Yoshiwara Station north exit in July 2022

General information
- Location: Suzukawa-Honchō 14, Fuji-shi, Shizuoka-ken; Japan
- Coordinates: 35°8′41″N 138°42′5″E
- Operator: JR Central; Gakunan Electric Train; Japan Freight Railway Company
- Lines: Tōkaidō Main Line; ■ Gakunan Railway Line
- Distance: 141.3 kilometers from Fuji
- Platforms: 1 island +1 bay platforms

Other information
- Status: Staffed (Midori no Madoguchi)
- Station code: CA07

History
- Opened: February 1, 1889
- Former names: Suzukawa (until 1956)

Passengers
- 2017: 3358 (JR), 1016 (Gakunan) daily
Location
- Location within Shizuoka Prefecture Location within Japan

Yoshiwara Station (吉原駅, Yoshiwara-eki) is an interchange railway station in the city Fuji, Shizuoka Prefecture, Japan operated by the Central Japan Railway Company (JR Tōkai). It is also a terminus for the private railway operator Gakunan Electric Train Company and a freight terminal of the Japan Freight Railway Company.

== Lines ==
Yoshiwara Station is served by the JR Tōkai Tōkaidō Main Line, and is located 141.3 kilometers from the official starting point of the line at Tokyo. It is the terminus of the Gakunan Railway Line.

== Layout ==
JR Yoshiwara Station has a single island platform serving Track 1 and Track 2, which are on passing loops. On the outside of either track are tracks to permit the through transit of express trains. The platform is connected to the station building by a footbridge. The station is attended and has a Midori no Madoguchi staffed ticket office. The Gakunan Electric Railway portion of the station has a bay platform with two tracks, only one of which is in normal daily use.

=== Platforms ===
1	■ Tōkaidō Main Line	For Numazu・Mishima・Atami
2	■ Tōkaidō Main Line	For Fuji・Shizuoka

== Adjacent stations ==
«	Service	»
Central Japan Railway Company
Tōkaidō Main Line CA07
Rapid: Does not stop at this station
Fuji CA08	Local	Higashi-Tagonoura CA06
Gakunan Electric Train
Gakunan Railway Line
Terminus	-	Jatco Mae

== History ==
Yoshiwara Station first opened as Suzukawa Station (鈴川駅, Suzukawa-eki) on February 1, 1889, when the section of the Tōkaidō Main Line connecting Shizuoka with Kōzu was completed. It became a terminus for the Gakunan Railway on November 18, 1949 and was renamed Yoshiwara Station (after Yoshiwara-juku on the old Tōkaidō on April 10, 1956. The present station building dates from 1970. Container freight services began operations from 1994.

Station numbering was introduced to the section of the Tōkaidō Line operated JR Central in March 2018; Yoshiwara Station was assigned station number CA07.

== Passenger statistics ==
In fiscal 2017, the JR station was used by an average of 3358 passengers daily and the Gakunan station was used by an average of 2016 passengers daily (boarding passengers only).

== Surrounding area ==
- Japan National Route 1
- Tagonoura Port

== See also ==
- List of railway stations in Japan
