= List of prefectural capitals in Japan =

A prefectural capital is a city where a prefectural government and assembly is located.

In Japan, a prefectural capital is officially called todōfukenchō shozaichi (都道府県庁所在地; "seat of a prefectural government", singular: 都庁所在地,tochō shozaichi in the [Tōkyō]-to, 道庁所在地, dōchō shozaichi in the [Hokkai]-dō, 府庁所在地, fuchō shozaichi in -fu, 県庁所在地, kenchō shozaichi in -ken), but the term kento (県都; "prefectural capital") is also used (dōto (道都; in the -dō, but never "futo" or "toto")).

== List of Japanese prefectural capitals ==
Capital	Prefecture	Region	Island	Pop.¹	ISO	Status
Akita	Akita	Tōhoku	Honshū	327,651	JP-05	Core city
Aomori	Aomori	Tōhoku	Honshū	304,657	JP-02	Core city
Chiba	Chiba	Kantō	Honshū	943,568	JP-12	Designated city
Fukui	Fukui	Chūbu	Honshū	268,210	JP-18	Core city
Fukuoka	Fukuoka	Kyūshū	Kyūshū	1,434,650	JP-40	Designated city
Fukushima	Fukushima	Tōhoku	Honshū	288,602	JP-07	Core city
Gifu	Gifu	Chūbu	Honshū	411,753	JP-21	Core city
Hiroshima	Hiroshima	Chūgoku	Honshū	1,164,885	JP-34	Designated city
Kagoshima	Kagoshima	Kyūshū	Kyūshū	604,268	JP-46	Core city
Kanazawa	Ishikawa	Chūbu	Honshū	455,952	JP-17	Core city
Kōbe	Hyōgo	Kansai	Honshū	1,532,305	JP-28	Designated city
Kōchi	Kōchi	Shikoku	Shikoku	345,418	JP-39	Core city
Kōfu	Yamanashi	Chūbu	Honshū	198,757	JP-19	Core city
Kumamoto	Kumamoto	Kyūshū	Kyūshū	670,014	JP-43	Designated city
Kyōto	Kyōto	Kansai	Honshū	1,468,065	JP-26	Designated city
Maebashi	Gunma	Kantō	Honshū	317,167	JP-10	Core city
Matsue	Shimane	Chūgoku	Honshū	195,008	JP-32	Core city
Matsuyama	Ehime	Shikoku	Shikoku	514,771	JP-38	Core city
Mito	Ibaraki	Kantō	Honshū	263,299	JP-08	Core city
Miyazaki	Miyazaki	Kyūshū	Kyūshū	368,984	JP-45	Core city
Morioka	Iwate	Tōhoku	Honshū	298,959	JP-03	Core city
Nagano	Nagano	Chūbu	Honshū	377,328	JP-20	Core city
Nagasaki	Nagasaki	Kyūshū	Kyūshū	446,551	JP-42	Core city
Nagoya	Aichi	Chūbu	Honshū	2,243,564	JP-23	Designated city
Naha	Okinawa	Kyūshū	Ryūkyū Islands	313,436	JP-47	Core city
Nara	Nara	Kansai	Honshū	366,863	JP-29	Core city
Niigata	Niigata	Chūbu	Honshū	811,613	JP-15	Designated city
Ōita	Ōita	Kyūshū	Kyūshū	467,617	JP-44	Core city
Okayama	Okayama	Chūgoku	Honshū	700,646	JP-33	Designated city
Ōsaka	Ōsaka	Kansai	Honshū	2,649,601	JP-27	Designated city
Ōtsu	Shiga	Kansai	Honshū	330,044	JP-25	Core city
Saga	Saga	Kyūshū	Kyūshū	239,003	JP-41	Special city
Saitama	Saitama	Kantō	Honshū	1,197,471	JP-11	Designated city
Sapporo	Hokkaidō	Hokkaidō	Hokkaidō	1,896,704	JP-01	Designated city
Sendai	Miyagi	Tōhoku	Honshū	1,029,576	JP-04	Designated city
Shinjuku	Tōkyō	Kantō	Honshū	314,262	JP-13	Special wards
Shizuoka	Shizuoka	Chūbu	Honshū	709,888	JP-22	Designated city
Takamatsu	Kagawa	Shikoku	Shikoku	417,671	JP-37	Core city
Tokushima	Tokushima	Shikoku	Shikoku	265,248	JP-36	City
Tottori	Tottori	Chūgoku	Honshū	199,319	JP-31	Core city
Toyama	Toyama	Chūbu	Honshū	420,584	JP-16	Core city
Tsu	Mie	Kansai	Honshū	287,849	JP-24	City
Utsunomiya	Tochigi	Kantō	Honshū	508,114	JP-09	Core city
Wakayama	Wakayama	Kansai	Honshū	371,504	JP-30	Core city
Yamagata	Yamagata	Tōhoku	Honshū	254,724	JP-06	Core city
Yamaguchi	Yamaguchi	Chūgoku	Honshū	191,714	JP-35	City
Yokohama	Kanagawa	Kantō	Honshū	3,643,641	JP-14	Designated city

Notes: ¹ As of 1 May 2008

== Non-capitals which share a name with their prefecture ==
In most cases, a city that shares a name with its prefecture is a prefectural capital. However, there are some municipalities that are not capitals.

- Iwate, Iwate Prefecture
- Ibaraki, Ibaraki Prefecture
- Okinawa, Okinawa Prefecture
- Tochigi, Tochigi Prefecture
- Yamanashi, Yamanashi Prefecture

== Capitals that are not the largest city/metropolitan area in their prefecture ==
Those in italics are prefectural capitals, or metropolitan areas of them.

Fukushima Prefecture

1.	Iwaki	348,322	1.	Kōriyama Metropolitan Area	537,493
2.	Kōriyama	338,887	2.	Fukushima Metropolitan Area	412,353
3.	Fukushima	294,724	3.	Iwaki Metropolitan Area	365,864

Gunma Prefecture

1.	Takasaki	342,662	1.	Takasaki Metropolitan Area	532,271
2.	Maebashi	317,114	2.	Maebashi Metropolitan Area	458,996

Mie Prefecture

1.	Yokkaichi	307,418	1.	Yokkaichi Metropolitan Area	606,071
2.	Tsu	288,874	2.	Tsu Metropolitan Area	308,375

Shizuoka Prefecture

1.	Hamamatsu	812,692	1.	Shizuoka Metropolitan Area	999,360
2.	Shizuoka	709,772	2.	Hamamatsu Metropolitan Area	919,933

Tottori Prefecture

1.	Tottori	199,263	1.	Yonago Metropolitan Area	252,387
2.	Yonago	148,234	2.	Tottori Metropolitan Area	249,067

Yamaguchi Prefecture

1.	Shimonoseki	284,693	1.	Shimonoseki Metropolitan Area	287,935
2.	Yamaguchi	191,740	2.	Ube Metropolitan Area	258,180
3.	Ube	175,334	3.	Yamaguchi Metropolitan Area	178,402

Notes:

City populations are as of July 2008.
Metropolitan area populations are as of 2000. (Urban Employment Areas)
