= Municipalities of Japan =

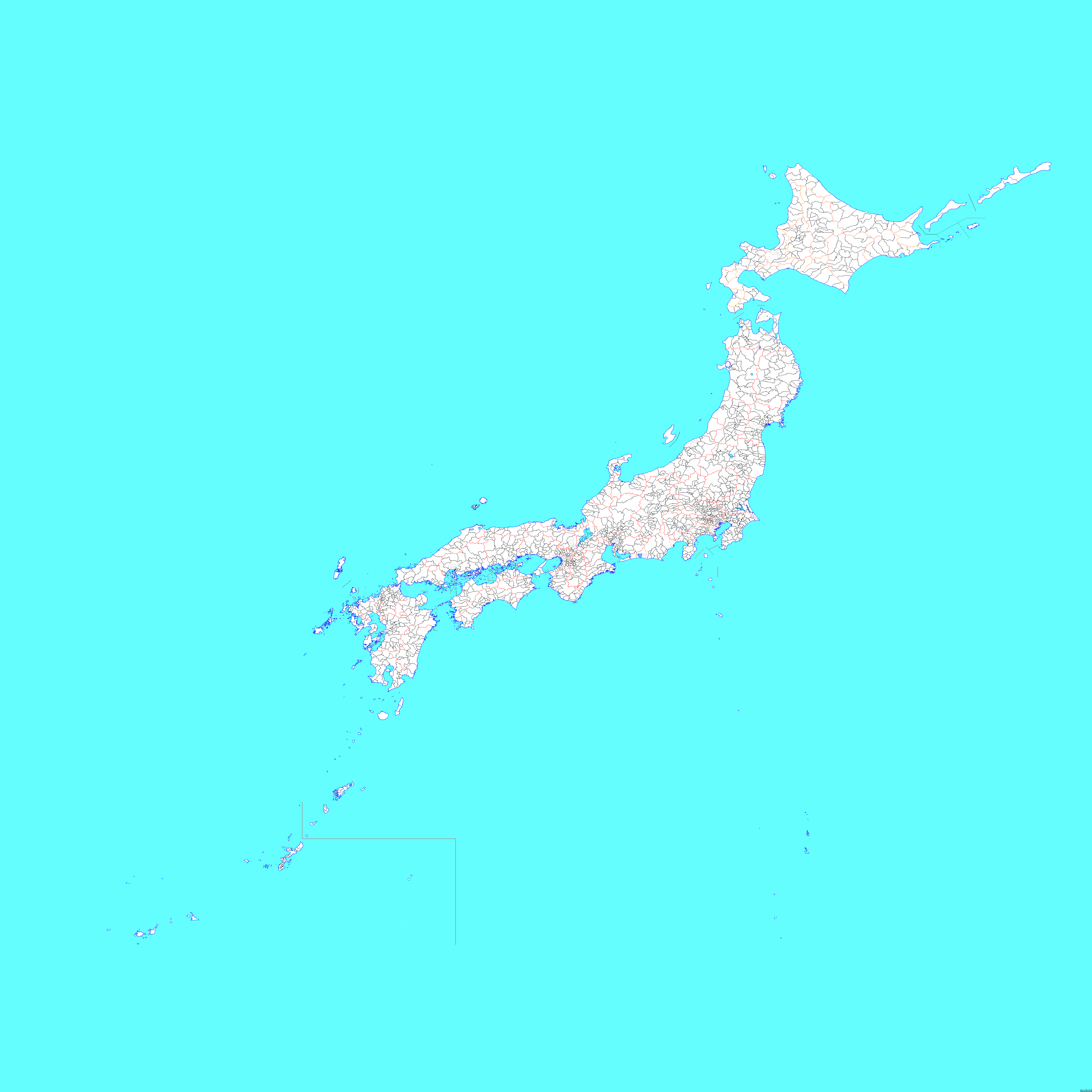
Map of all Municipalities of Japan including disputed territories

Municipalities are a level of administration in Japan. The country has three levels of governments: national, prefectural, and municipal.

The nation is divided into 47 prefectures (within these, one metropolis, one regional prefecture, and two urban prefectures). Each prefecture consists of numerous municipalities, with 1,718 in total as of October 2018.

There are four types of municipalities in Japan: cities (市, shi), towns (町, chō), villages (村, son) and special wards of Tokyo (区, ku). In Japanese, this system is known as shikuchōson (市区町村), where each kanji in the word represents one of the four types of municipalities. In Tokyo, because the wards are at the center, the system is officially referred to as kushichōson (区市町村), with the wards first, and cities second.

Some designated cities also have further administrative subdivisions, also known as wards, but, unlike the special wards of Tokyo, these wards are not municipalities.

== Types of Municipalities ==
Japanese Municipal System (Kushichōson)
Municipality Type	Japanese	Reading	Translation	Population Range	Characteristics
Ku	区	ku	Ward	Varies	Special wards of Tokyo or administrative divisions within designated cities
Shi	市	shi	City	50,000+	Most common municipality type, requires minimum population
Chō	町	chō/machi	Town	5,000-50,000	Intermediate level between village and city, more urban than rural
Son	村	son/mura	Village	Under 5,000	Smallest municipal unit, predominantly rural

== Status ==
The status of a municipality, if it is a village, town or city, is decided by the prefectural government. Generally, a village or town can be promoted to a city when its population increases above fifty thousand, and a city can (but need not) be demoted to a town or village when its population decreases below fifty thousand. The least-populated city, Utashinai, Hokkaidō, has a population of merely four thousand, while a town in the same prefecture, Otofuke, Hokkaidō, has nearly forty thousand residents, and the country's largest village Yomitan, Okinawa has a population of 40,517.

The capital city, Tokyo, no longer has municipal status, but metropolitan (都, to), equivalent to prefectural level status. The Tokyo Metropolis now encompasses the 23 special wards, as well as 26 cities, 6 towns and 8 villages on the Tama Area and Insular Area. Each of the 23 special wards of Tokyo, which even though they are wards (区, ku), and not cities (市, shi), have near municipal level status. Sometimes the 23 special wards area (東京都区部, Tōkyō-to kubu) as a whole is regarded as one city (都内, Tonai). For information on the former city of Tokyo, see Tokyo City; for information about present-day Tokyo Metropolis, see Tokyo.

== Examples ==
See List of cities in Japan for a complete list of cities. See also: Core cities of Japan

The following are examples of the 20 designated cities:

- Fukuoka, the most populous city in the Kyūshū region
- Hiroshima, the busy manufacturing city in the Chūgoku region of Honshū
- Kobe, a major port on the Inland Sea, located in the center of Honshū near Osaka
- Kitakyūshū, a city of just under one million inhabitants in Kyūshū
- Kyoto, former capital, historic center and thriving modern city
- Nagoya, center of a major automobile-manufacturing region on the eastern seaboard of Honshū
- Osaka, a vast manufacturing city on the Inland Sea coast of Honshū
- Sapporo, the largest city in Hokkaidō
- Sendai, the principal center of northeast Honshū (also known as the Tōhoku region)
- Yokohama, a port city just south of Tokyo

== Non-municipality ==
The same kanji which designates a town (町) is also sometimes used for addresses of sections of an urban area. In rare cases, a municipal village might even contain a section with the same type of designation. Although the kanji is the same, neither of these individual sections are municipalities unto themselves. Sometimes, the section name is a remnant from gappei, a system where several adjacent communities merge to form a larger municipality, where the old town names are kept for a section of the new city, even though the resulting new city may have a completely different name.

- Subprefectures are branch offices of the prefectures and not municipalities by themselves.
- Districts are not current municipalities but names of groups of towns and villages.
- Provinces are not current municipalities but (almost obsolete) names of geographical regions similar to prefectures.

== See also ==
- Administrative division
- Urban area
- Local Autonomy Law
- 23 special wards of Tokyo
- Japanese addressing system
- Merger and dissolution of municipalities of Japan
- List of mergers and dissolutions of municipalities in Japan
