= List of cities in Japan =

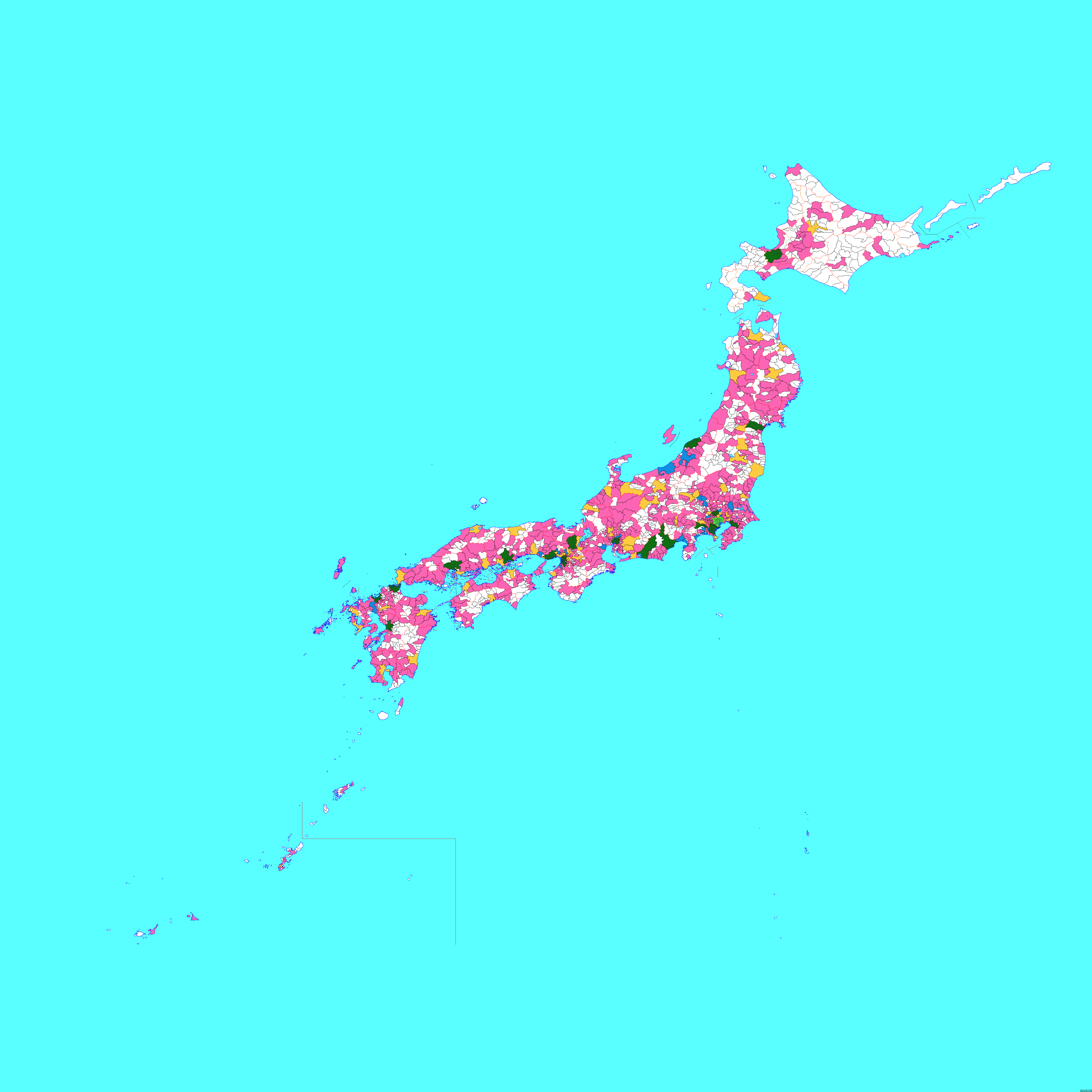
Cities designated by government ordinance Core cities Special cities Cities Special wards

This is a list of cities in Japan sorted by prefecture and within prefecture by founding date. The list is also sortable by population, area, density and foundation date. Most large cities in Japan are cities designated by government ordinance. Some regionally important cities are designated as core cities. While the City of Tokyo ceased to exist on July 1, 1943, being replaced by the 23 special wards that make up the eastern part of the special metropolis prefecture (都, to) Tokyo, it has been included on this list concurrently with the special wards.

== Cities ==
Type	Japanese term	Quantity
City designated by government ordinance	政令指定都市	20
Core city	中核市	62
Former special city (category abolished in 2015)	特例市	23
City	市	687
Special ward of Tokyo	特別区	23
Tokyo	東京特別区部	1

City (Special Ward)	Japanese	Prefecture	Population	Area (km^{2})	Density (per km^{2})	Founded	Website
Nagoya	名古屋市	Aichi	2,327,557	326.45	6,860	1889-10-01	
Toyohashi	豊橋市	Aichi	377,045	261.35	1,443	1906-08-01	
Okazaki	岡崎市	Aichi	371,380	387.24	959	1916-07-01	
Ichinomiya	一宮市	Aichi	375,939	113.91	3,300	1921-09-01	
Seto	瀬戸市	Aichi	132,311	111.61	1,185	1929-10-01	
Handa	半田市	Aichi	117,927	47.24	2,496	1937-10-01	
Kasugai	春日井市	Aichi	300,713	92.71	3,244	1943-06-01	
Toyokawa	豊川市	Aichi	161,595	150.71	1,072	1943-06-01	
Tsushima	津島市	Aichi	65,646	25.08	2,617	1947-03-01	
Hekinan	碧南市	Aichi	73,024	35.86	2,036	1948-04-05	
Kariya	刈谷市	Aichi	145,117	50.45	2,876	1950-04-01	
Toyota	豊田市	Aichi	420,286	918.47	458	1951-03-01	
Anjō	安城市	Aichi	176,046	86.01	2,047	1952-05-05	
Nishio	西尾市	Aichi	106,643	75.78	1,407	1953-12-15	
Gamagōri	蒲郡市	Aichi	82,264	56.81	1,448	1954-04-01	
Inuyama	犬山市	Aichi	75,304	74.97	1,004	1954-04-01	
Tokoname	常滑市	Aichi	52,837	55.63	950	1954-04-01	
Kōnan	江南市	Aichi	100,064	30.17	3,317	1954-06-01	
Komaki	小牧市	Aichi	149,060	62.82	2,373	1955-01-01	
Inazawa	稲沢市	Aichi	137,475	79.30	1,734	1958-11-01	
Tōkai	東海市	Aichi	106,708	43.36	2,461	1969-04-01	
Ōbu	大府市	Aichi	83,097	33.68	2,467	1970-09-01	
Chita	知多市	Aichi	84,782	45.43	1,866	1970-09-01	
Chiryū	知立市	Aichi	68,216	16.34	4,175	1970-12-01	
Owariasahi	尾張旭市	Aichi	79,197	21.03	3,766	1970-12-01	
Takahama	高浜市	Aichi	43,467	13.00	3,344	1970-12-01	
Iwakura	岩倉市	Aichi	48,042	10.49	4,580	1971-12-01	
Toyoake	豊明市	Aichi	69,124	23.18	2,982	1972-08-01	
Nisshin	日進市	Aichi	80,921	34.90	2,319	1994-10-01	
Tahara	田原市	Aichi	66,698	188.81	353	2003-08-20	
Aisai	愛西市	Aichi	65,481	66.63	983	2005-04-01	
Kiyosu	清須市	Aichi	56,635	13.31	4,255	2005-07-07	
Shinshiro	新城市	Aichi	51,326	499.00	103	2005-10-01	
Kitanagoya	北名古屋市	Aichi	80,112	18.37	4,361	2006-03-20	
Yatomi	弥富市	Aichi	43,145	48.92	882	2006-04-01	
Miyoshi	みよし市	Aichi	62,001	32.11	1,930	2010-01-04	
Ama	あま市	Aichi	86,876	27.59	3,160	2010-03-22	
Nagakute	長久手市	Aichi	57,764	21.55	2,680	2012-01-04	
Akita	秋田市	Akita	329,287	905.67	364	1889-04-01	
Ōdate	大館市	Akita	80,587	913.70	88.2	1951-04-01	
Kazuno	鹿角市	Akita	35,543	707.34	50.2	1972-04-01	
Daisen	大仙市	Akita	91,143	866.67	105	2005-03-22	
Katagami	潟上市	Akita	35,460	97.96	362	2005-03-22	
Kitaakita	北秋田市	Akita	38,543	1,152.57	33.4	2005-03-22	
Oga	男鹿市	Akita	34,194	240.80	142	2005-03-22	
Yurihonjō	由利本荘市	Akita	87,525	1,209.04	72.4	2005-03-22	
Yuzawa	湯沢市	Akita	53,588	790.72	67.8	2005-03-22	
Semboku	仙北市	Akita	30,885	1,093.64	28.2	2005-09-20	
Yokote	横手市	Akita	101,234	693.60	146	2005-10-01	
Nikaho	にかほ市	Akita	28,422	240.61	118	2005-10-01	
Noshiro	能代市	Akita	61,295	426.74	144	2006-03-21	
Hachinohe	八戸市	Aomori	241,613	305.17	792	1929-05-01	
Kuroishi	黒石市	Aomori	37,585	216.96	173	1954-07-01	
Misawa	三沢市	Aomori	42,535	119.97	355	1958-09-01	
Mutsu	むつ市	Aomori	62,220	863.79	72.0	1959-09-01	
Towada	十和田市	Aomori	66,834	688.60	97.1	2005-01-01	
Tsugaru	つがる市	Aomori	38,919	253.85	153	2005-02-11	
Goshogawara	五所川原市	Aomori	60,788	404.58	150	2005-03-28	
Aomori	青森市	Aomori	290,000	824.52	371	2005-04-01	
Hirakawa	平川市	Aomori	34,638	345.81	100	2006-01-01	
Hirosaki	弘前市	Aomori	185,865	523.60	355	2006-02-27	
Chiba	千葉市	Chiba	1,001,230	272.08	3,450	1921-01-01	
Chōshi	銚子市	Chiba	72,348	83.91	862	1933-02-11	
Ichikawa	市川市	Chiba	470,149	57.40	8,191	1934-11-03	
Funabashi	船橋市	Chiba	586,762	85.64	6,851	1937-04-01	
Tateyama	館山市	Chiba	49,987	110.21	454	1939-11-03	
Kisarazu	木更津市	Chiba	123,743	138.73	892	1942-11-03	
Matsudo	松戸市	Chiba	477,603	61.33	7,787	1943-04-01	
Noda	野田市	Chiba	153,422	103.54	1,482	1950-05-03	
Mobara	茂原市	Chiba	93,032	100.01	930	1952-04-01	
Narita	成田市	Chiba	124,773	213.84	583	1954-03-31	
Sakura	佐倉市	Chiba	171,472	103.59	1,655	1954-03-31	
Tōgane	東金市	Chiba	61,591	89.34	689	1954-04-01	
Narashino	習志野市	Chiba	159,758	20.99	7,611	1954-08-01	
Kashiwa	柏市	Chiba	389,036	114.90	3,386	1954-09-01	
Katsuura	勝浦市	Chiba	21,413	94.20	227	1958-10-01	
Ichihara	市原市	Chiba	279,591	368.20	759	1963-05-01	
Nagareyama	流山市	Chiba	156,686	35.28	4,441	1967-01-01	
Yachiyo	八千代市	Chiba	184,655	51.27	3,602	1967-01-01	
Abiko	我孫子市	Chiba	133,533	43.19	3,092	1970-07-01	
Kamagaya	鎌ヶ谷市	Chiba	104,564	21.11	4,953	1971-09-01	
Kimitsu	君津市	Chiba	89,350	318.83	280	1971-09-01	
Futtsu	富津市	Chiba	48,973	205.35	238	1971-09-01	
Urayasu	浦安市	Chiba	159,312	17.29	9,214	1981-04-01	
Yotsukaidō	四街道市	Chiba	85,738	34.70	2,471	1981-04-01	
Sodegaura	袖ヶ浦市	Chiba	59,443	94.92	626	1991-04-01	
Yachimata	八街市	Chiba	75,369	74.87	1,007	1992-04-01	
Inzai	印西市	Chiba	60,280	53.51	1,127	1996-04-01	
Shiroi	白井市	Chiba	57,151	35.41	1,614	2001-04-01	
Tomisato	富里市	Chiba	51,590	53.91	957	2002-04-01	
Kamogawa	鴨川市	Chiba	35,792	191.30	187	2005-02-11	
Asahi	旭市	Chiba	69,971	129.91	539	2005-07-01	
Isumi	いすみ市	Chiba	41,605	157.50	264	2005-12-05	
Sōsa	匝瑳市	Chiba	41,361	101.78	406	2006-01-23	
Minamibōsō	南房総市	Chiba	43,553	230.22	189	2006-03-20	
Katori	香取市	Chiba	85,193	262.31	325	2006-03-27	
Sanmu	山武市	Chiba	57,806	146.38	395	2006-03-27	
Ōamishirasato	大網白里市	Chiba	51,176	58.06	881	2013-01-01	
Matsuyama	松山市	Ehime	515,068	429.03	1,201	1889-12-15	
Niihama	新居浜市	Ehime	123,329	234.30	526	1937-11-03	
Shikokuchūō	四国中央市	Ehime	91,688	420.10	218	2004-04-01	
Seiyo	西予市	Ehime	43,476	514.79	84.5	2004-04-01	
Tōon	東温市	Ehime	35,517	211.45	168	2004-09-21	
Saijō	西条市	Ehime	112,543	509.05	221	2004-11-01	
Ōzu	大洲市	Ehime	49,543	432.20	115	2005-01-11	
Imabari	今治市	Ehime	170,986	419.85	407	2005-01-16	
Yawatahama	八幡浜市	Ehime	40,010	132.98	301	2005-03-28	
Iyo	伊予市	Ehime	38,890	194.47	200	2005-04-01	
Uwajima	宇和島市	Ehime	86,819	469.52	185	2005-08-01	
Fukui	福井市	Fukui	268,574	536.17	501	1889-04-01	[/]
Tsuruga	敦賀市	Fukui	68,188	250.75	272	1937-04-01	
Obama	小浜市	Fukui	31,486	232.86	135	1951-03-30	
Ōno	大野市	Fukui	36,763	872.30	42.1	1954-07-01	
Katsuyama	勝山市	Fukui	26,333	253.68	104	1954-09-01	
Sabae	鯖江市	Fukui	67,430	84.75	796	1955-01-15	
Awara	あわら市	Fukui	30,765	116.99	263	2004-03-01	
Echizen	越前市	Fukui	87,116	230.75	378	2005-10-01	
Sakai	坂井市	Fukui	92,420	209.91	440	2006-03-20	
Fukuoka	福岡市	Fukuoka	1,588,924	340.96	4,515	1889-04-01	
Kurume	久留米市	Fukuoka	305,147	229.84	1,328	1889-04-01	
Ōmuta	大牟田市	Fukuoka	127,474	81.55	1,563	1917-03-01	
Nōgata	直方市	Fukuoka	57,319	61.78	928	1931-01-01	
Tagawa	田川市	Fukuoka	50,484	54.52	926	1943-11-03	
Yanagawa	柳川市	Fukuoka	72,798	76.90	947	1952-04-01	
Yame	八女市	Fukuoka	60,114	482.44	125	1954-04-01	
Chikugo	筑後市	Fukuoka	48,281	41.85	1,154	1954-04-01	
Ōkawa	大川市	Fukuoka	38,266	33.61	1,139	1954-04-01	
Yukuhashi	行橋市	Fukuoka	70,064	69.83	1,003	1954-10-10	
Buzen	豊前市	Fukuoka	27,578	111.17	248	1955-04-10	
Nakagawa	那珂川市	Fukuoka	50,004	74.95	667	2018-10-01	
Nakama	中間市	Fukuoka	45,549	15.98	2,850	1958-11-01	
Kitakyushu	北九州市	Fukuoka	940,978	487.71	2,024	1963-02-10	
Ogōri	小郡市	Fukuoka	58,460	45.50	1,285	1972-04-01	
Chikushino	筑紫野市	Fukuoka	98,914	87.78	1,127	1972-04-01	
Kasuga	春日市	Fukuoka	107,845	14.15	7,622	1972-04-01	
Ōnojō	大野城市	Fukuoka	94,037	26.88	3,498	1972-04-01	
Munakata	宗像市	Fukuoka	94,877	119.66	793	1981-04-01	
Dazaifu	太宰府市	Fukuoka	68,561	29.58	2,318	1982-04-01	
Koga	古賀市	Fukuoka	57,084	42.11	1,356	1997-10-01	
Fukutsu	福津市	Fukuoka	55,123	52.70	1,046	2005-01-24	
Ukiha	うきは市	Fukuoka	32,277	117.55	275	2005-03-20	
Miyawaka	宮若市	Fukuoka	30,793	139.99	220	2006-02-11	
Asakura	朝倉市	Fukuoka	57,881	246.73	235	2006-03-20	
Iizuka	飯塚市	Fukuoka	132,208	214.13	617	2006-03-26	
Kama	嘉麻市	Fukuoka	44,431	135.18	329	2006-03-27	
Miyama	みやま市	Fukuoka	42,219	105.12	402	2007-01-29	
Itoshima	糸島市	Fukuoka	100,304	216.12	464.11	2010-01-01	
Aizuwakamatsu	会津若松市	Fukushima	129,388	383.03	338	1899-04-01	
Fukushima	福島市	Fukushima	289,355	746.43	388	1907-04-01	
Kōriyama	郡山市	Fukushima	339,395	757.06	448	1924-09-01	
Sukagawa	須賀川市	Fukushima	80,336	279.55	287	1954-03-31	
Sōma	相馬市	Fukushima	38,543	197.67	195	1954-03-31	
Iwaki	いわき市	Fukushima	349,947	1,231.34	284	1966-10-01	
Tamura	田村市	Fukushima	42,221	458.30	92.1	2005-03-01	
Shirakawa	白河市	Fukushima	65,665	305.30	215	2005-11-07	
Nihonmatsu	二本松市	Fukushima	61,698	344.65	179	2005-12-01	
Minamisōma	南相馬市	Fukushima	71,761	398.50	180	2006-01-01	
Date	伊達市	Fukushima	67,487	265.10	255	2006-01-01	
Kitakata	喜多方市	Fukushima	54,684	554.67	98.6	2006-01-04	
Motomiya	本宮市	Fukushima	31,737	87.94	361	2007-01-01	
Gifu	岐阜市	Gifu	412,779	202.89	2,034	1889-07-01	
Ōgaki	大垣市	Gifu	163,047	206.52	789	1918-04-01	
Takayama	高山市	Gifu	94,879	2,177.67	43.6	1936-11-01	
Tajimi	多治見市	Gifu	114,866	91.24	1,259	1940-08-01	
Seki	関市	Gifu	92,896	472.84	196	1950-10-15	
Nakatsugawa	中津川市	Gifu	83,116	676.38	123	1952-04-01	
Mino	美濃市	Gifu	22,912	117.05	196	1954-04-01	
Mizunami	瑞浪市	Gifu	41,556	175.00	237	1954-04-01	
Hashima	羽島市	Gifu	67,167	53.64	1,252	1954-04-01	
Minokamo	美濃加茂市	Gifu	53,988	74.81	722	1954-04-01	
Toki	土岐市	Gifu	61,393	116.01	529	1955-02-01	
Kakamigahara	各務原市	Gifu	145,126	87.77	1,653	1963-04-01	
Kani	可児市	Gifu	99,318	87.60	1,134	1982-04-01	
Yamagata	山県市	Gifu	29,857	222.04	134	2003-04-01	
Mizuho	瑞穂市	Gifu	51,230	28.18	1,818	2003-05-01	
Hida	飛騨市	Gifu	28,112	792.31	35.5	2004-02-01	
Motosu	本巣市	Gifu	34,729	374.57	92.7	2004-02-01	
Gujō	郡上市	Gifu	46,338	1,030.79	45.0	2004-03-01	
Gero	下呂市	Gifu	37,455	851.06	44.0	2004-03-01	
Ena	恵那市	Gifu	54,844	504.19	109	2004-10-25	
Kaizu	海津市	Gifu	38,532	112.31	343	2005-03-28	
Maebashi	前橋市	Gunma	318,058	241.22	1,319	1892-04-01	
Takasaki	高崎市	Gunma	341,838	401.01	852	1900-04-01	
Kiryū	桐生市	Gunma	124,892	274.57	455	1921-03-01	
Isesaki	伊勢崎市	Gunma	204,240	139.33	1,466	1940-09-13	
Ōta	太田市	Gunma	214,049	176.49	1,213	1948-05-03	
Numata	沼田市	Gunma	52,319	443.37	118	1954-04-01	
Tatebayashi	館林市	Gunma	79,023	60.98	1,296	1954-04-01	
Fujioka	藤岡市	Gunma	68,710	180.09	382	1954-04-01	
Shibukawa	渋川市	Gunma	86,134	240.42	358	2006-02-20	
Annaka	安中市	Gunma	62,270	276.34	225	2006-03-18	
Tomioka	富岡市	Gunma	53,332	122.90	434	2006-03-27	
Midori	みどり市	Gunma	51,964	208.23	250	2006-03-27	
Hiroshima	広島市	Hiroshima	1,199,391	905.13	1,286	1889-04-01	
Onomichi	尾道市	Hiroshima	148,085	284.85	520	1898-04-01	
Kure	呉市	Hiroshima	246,118	353.74	696	1902-10-01	
Fukuyama	福山市	Hiroshima	461,368	518.07	891	1916-07-01	
Mihara	三原市	Hiroshima	103,209	471.03	219	1936-11-15	
Fuchū	府中市	Hiroshima	44,212	195.71	226	1954-03-31	
Miyoshi	三次市	Hiroshima	58,264	778.19	74.9	1954-03-31	
Shōbara	庄原市	Hiroshima	41,747	1,246.60	33.5	1954-03-31	
Ōtake	大竹市	Hiroshima	29,665	78.55	378	1954-09-01	
Takehara	竹原市	Hiroshima	29,803	118.30	252	1958-11-03	
Higashihiroshima	東広島市	Hiroshima	187,711	635.32	295	1974-04-20	
Hatsukaichi	廿日市市	Hiroshima	115,184	489.36	235	1988-04-01	
Akitakata	安芸高田市	Hiroshima	32,323	537.79	60.1	2004-03-01	
Etajima	江田島市	Hiroshima	28,601	100.97	283	2004-11-01	
Sapporo	札幌市	Hokkaido	1,976,257	1,121.26	1,763	1922-08-01	
Hakodate	函館市	Hokkaido	243,942	677.89	409	1922-08-01	
Otaru	小樽市	Hokkaido	130,255	243.30	535	1922-08-01	
Asahikawa	旭川市	Hokkaido	350,511	747.60	469	1922-08-01	
Muroran	室蘭市	Hokkaido	93,078	80.65	1,154	1922-08-01	
Obihiro	帯広市	Hokkaido	168,188	618.94	272	1933-04-01	
Yūbari	夕張市	Hokkaido	7,205	763.07	9.44	1943-04-01	
Iwamizawa	岩見沢市	Hokkaido	89,023	481.10	185	1943-04-01	
Abashiri	網走市	Hokkaido	100,000	471.00	81.8	1947-02-11	
Rumoi	留萌市	Hokkaido	24,036	297.44	80.8	1947-10-01	
Tomakomai	苫小牧市	Hokkaido	173,761	561.49	309	1948-04-01	
Wakkanai	稚内市	Hokkaido	37,911	760.83	49.8	1949-04-01	
Bibai	美唄市	Hokkaido	25,312	277.61	91.2	1950-04-01	
Ashibetsu	芦別市	Hokkaido	12,542	865.04	14.5	1953-04-01	
Ebetsu	江別市	Hokkaido	120,940	187.57	645	1954-07-01	
Akabira	赤平市	Hokkaido	9,453	129.88	72.8	1954-07-01	
Monbetsu	紋別市	Hokkaido	24,293	830.70	29.2	1954-07-01	
Mikasa	三笠市	Hokkaido	8,029	302.52	26.5	1957-04-01	
Nemuro	根室市	Hokkaido	28,923	512.63	56.4	1957-08-01	
Chitose	千歳市	Hokkaido	94,124	594.95	158	1958-07-01	
Takikawa	滝川市	Hokkaido	42,815	115.82	370	1958-07-01	
Sunagawa	砂川市	Hokkaido	16,283	78.68	207	1958-07-01	
Utashinai	歌志内市	Hokkaido	2,971	55.95	53.1	1958-07-01	
Fukagawa	深川市	Hokkaido	23,215	529.23	43.9	1963-05-01	
Furano	富良野市	Hokkaido	23,890	600.97	39.8	1966-05-01	
Noboribetsu	登別市	Hokkaido	51,474	212.11	243	1970-08-01	
Eniwa	恵庭市	Hokkaido	68,754	294.87	233	1970-11-01	
Date	伊達市	Hokkaido	36,461	444.28	82.1	1972-04-01	
Kitahiroshima	北広島市	Hokkaido	60,291	118.54	509	1996-09-01	
Ishikari	石狩市	Hokkaido	60,616	721.86	84.0	1996-09-01	
Shibetsu	士別市	Hokkaido	21,640	1,119.29	19.3	2005-09-01	
Kushiro	釧路市	Hokkaido	182,263	1,362.75	134	2005-10-11	
Hokuto	北斗市	Hokkaido	48,779	397.30	123	2006-02-01	
Kitami	北見市	Hokkaido	124,291	1,427.56	87.1	2006-03-05	
Nayoro	名寄市	Hokkaido	29,869	535.23	55.8	2006-03-27	
Kobe	神戸市	Hyōgo	1,524,601	552.23	2,772	1889-04-01	
Himeji	姫路市	Hyōgo	536,170	534.27	1,004	1889-04-01	
Amagasaki	尼崎市	Hyōgo	461,202	49.77	9,267	1916-04-01	
Akashi	明石市	Hyōgo	292,162	49.24	5,933	1919-11-01	
Nishinomiya	西宮市	Hyōgo	477,056	99.96	4,772	1925-04-01	
Ashiya	芦屋市	Hyōgo	92,828	18.47	5,026	1940-11-10	
Itami	伊丹市	Hyōgo	194,488	24.97	7,789	1940-11-10	
Aioi	相生市	Hyōgo	31,973	90.45	353	1942-10-01	
Toyooka	豊岡市	Hyōgo	87,555	697.66	125	1950-04-01	
Kakogawa	加古川市	Hyōgo	267,631	138.51	1,932	1950-06-15	
Akō	赤穂市	Hyōgo	51,277	126.88	404	1951-09-01	
Takarazuka	宝塚市	Hyōgo	222,071	101.80	2,181	1954-04-01	
Miki	三木市	Hyōgo	83,244	176.58	471	1954-06-01	
Takasago	高砂市	Hyōgo	94,198	34.40	2,738	1954-07-01	
Kawanishi	川西市	Hyōgo	157,461	53.44	2,947	1954-08-01	
Ono	小野市	Hyōgo	49,664	92.92	534	1954-12-01	
Sanda	三田市	Hyōgo	113,600	210.22	540	1958-07-01	
Kasai	加西市	Hyōgo	48,435	150.95	321	1967-04-01	
Tamba-Sasayama	丹波篠山市	Hyōgo	44,345	377.61	117	1999-04-01	
Yabu	養父市	Hyōgo	27,428	422.78	64.9	2004-04-01	
Tamba	丹波市	Hyōgo	69,233	493.28	140	2004-11-01	
Minamiawaji	南あわじ市	Hyōgo	51,069	229.18	223	2005-01-11	
Asago	朝来市	Hyōgo	34,084	402.98	84.6	2005-04-01	
Awaji	淡路市	Hyōgo	47,849	184.21	260	2005-04-01	
Shisō	宍粟市	Hyōgo	42,302	658.60	64.2	2005-04-01	
Nishiwaki	西脇市	Hyōgo	43,126	132.47	326	2005-10-01	
Tatsuno	たつの市	Hyōgo	80,988	210.93	384	2005-10-01	
Sumoto	洲本市	Hyōgo	48,631	182.47	267	2006-02-11	
Katō	加東市	Hyōgo	39,935	157.49	254	2006-03-20	
Mito	水戸市	Ibaraki	264,062	217.43	1,214	1889-04-01	
Hitachi	日立市	Ibaraki	195,844	225.55	868	1939-09-01	
Tsuchiura	土浦市	Ibaraki	143,986	113.82	1,265	1940-11-03	
Yūki	結城市	Ibaraki	52,065	65.84	791	1954-03-15	
Ryūgasaki	龍ヶ崎市	Ibaraki	79,295	78.20	1,014	1954-03-20	
Shimotsuma	下妻市	Ibaraki	45,918	80.88	568	1954-06-01	
Jōsō	常総市	Ibaraki	65,858	123.52	533	1954-07-10	
Hitachiōta	常陸太田市	Ibaraki	58,461	372.01	157	1954-07-15	
Takahagi	高萩市	Ibaraki	32,031	193.65	165	1954-11-23	
Kitaibaraki	北茨城市	Ibaraki	48,437	186.55	260	1956-03-31	
Toride	取手市	Ibaraki	109,953	69.96	1,572	1970-10-01	
Ushiku	牛久市	Ibaraki	79,254	58.88	1,346	1986-06-01	
Tsukuba	つくば市	Ibaraki	207,314	284.07	730	1987-11-30	
Hitachinaka	ひたちなか市	Ibaraki	155,338	99.04	1,568	1994-11-01	
Kashima	鹿嶋市	Ibaraki	65,193	92.96	701	1995-09-01	
Itako	潮来市	Ibaraki	31,103	62.67	496	2001-04-01	
Moriya	守谷市	Ibaraki	57,793	35.63	1,622	2002-02-02	
Hitachiōmiya	常陸大宮市	Ibaraki	46,729	348.38	134	2004-10-16	
Naka	那珂市	Ibaraki	54,618	97.80	558	2005-01-21	
Bandō	坂東市	Ibaraki	57,128	123.18	464	2005-03-22	
Inashiki	稲敷市	Ibaraki	48,125	178.12	270	2005-03-22	
Chikusei	筑西市	Ibaraki	110,813	205.35	540	2005-03-28	
Kasumigaura	かすみがうら市	Ibaraki	44,450	118.77	374	2005-03-28	
Kamisu	神栖市	Ibaraki	93,538	147.24	635	2005-08-01	
Namegata	行方市	Ibaraki	39,117	166.33	235	2005-09-02	
Koga	古河市	Ibaraki	144,392	123.58	1,168	2005-09-12	
Ishioka	石岡市	Ibaraki	80,502	213.38	377	2005-10-01	
Sakuragawa	桜川市	Ibaraki	47,480	179.78	264	2005-10-01	
Hokota	鉾田市	Ibaraki	50,869	203.90	249	2005-10-11	
Kasama	笠間市	Ibaraki	80,646	240.27	336	2006-03-19	
Tsukubamirai	つくばみらい市	Ibaraki	41,957	79.14	530	2006-03-27	
Omitama	小美玉市	Ibaraki	52,834	140.21	377	2006-03-27	
Kanazawa	金沢市	Ishikawa	455,595	467.77	974	1889-04-01	
Nonoichi	野々市市	Ishikawa	51,976	13.56	3,800	2011-11-11	
Nanao	七尾市	Ishikawa	60,140	317.96	189	1939-07-20	
Komatsu	小松市	Ishikawa	109,285	371.13	294	1940-12-01	
Suzu	珠洲市	Ishikawa	13,472	247.20	54.5	1954-07-15	
Hakui	羽咋市	Ishikawa	23,963	81.96	292	1958-07-01	
Kahoku	かほく市	Ishikawa	34,747	64.76	537	2004-03-01	
Hakusan	白山市	Ishikawa	110,563	755.17	146	2005-02-01	
Nomi	能美市	Ishikawa	48,106	83.85	574	2005-02-01	
Kaga	加賀市	Ishikawa	73,745	306.00	241	2005-10-01	
Wajima	輪島市	Ishikawa	31,532	426.25	74.0	2006-02-01	
Morioka	盛岡市	Iwate	299,746	886.47	338	1889-04-01	
Kamaishi	釜石市	Iwate	41,348	441.42	93.7	1937-05-05	
Ōfunato	大船渡市	Iwate	42,119	323.28	130	1952-04-01	
Rikuzentakata	陸前高田市	Iwate	23,961	232.29	103	1955-01-01	
Kitakami	北上市	Iwate	94,806	437.55	217	1991-04-01	
Miyako	宮古市	Iwate	58,342	696.82	83.7	2005-06-06	
Hachimantai	八幡平市	Iwate	29,993	862.25	34.8	2005-09-01	
Ichinoseki	一関市	Iwate	123,155	1,133.10	109	2005-09-20	
Tōno	遠野市	Iwate	30,587	825.62	37.0	2005-10-01	
Hanamaki	花巻市	Iwate	103,718	908.32	114	2006-01-01	
Ninohe	二戸市	Iwate	30,685	420.31	73.0	2006-01-01	
Ōshū	奥州市	Iwate	128,273	993.35	129	2006-02-20	
Kuji	久慈市	Iwate	37,824	623.14	60.7	2006-03-06	
Takizawa	滝沢市	Iwate	55,153	182.32	303	2014-01-01	
Takamatsu	高松市	Kagawa	418,557	375.11	1,116	1890-02-15	
Marugame	丸亀市	Kagawa	110,550	111.79	989	1899-04-01	
Sakaide	坂出市	Kagawa	56,501	92.46	611	1942-07-01	
Zentsūji	善通寺市	Kagawa	35,180	39.88	882	1954-03-31	
Sanuki	さぬき市	Kagawa	54,832	158.90	345	2002-04-01	
Higashikagawa	東かがわ市	Kagawa	34,953	153.35	228	2003-04-01	
Kan'onji	観音寺市	Kagawa	64,020	117.47	545	2005-10-11	
Mitoyo	三豊市	Kagawa	69,997	222.66	314	2006-01-01	
Kagoshima	鹿児島市	Kagoshima	605,196	547.06	1,106	1889-04-01	
Kanoya	鹿屋市	Kagoshima	105,673	448.33	236	1941-05-27	
Makurazaki	枕崎市	Kagoshima	24,400	74.88	326	1949-09-01	
Akune	阿久根市	Kagoshima	24,166	134.30	180	1952-04-01	
Izumi	出水市	Kagoshima	56,851	330.06	172	1954-04-01	
Ibusuki	指宿市	Kagoshima	45,455	149.01	305	1954-04-01	
Minamisatsuma	南さつま市	Kagoshima	40,386	283.35	143	1954-07-15	
Nishinoomote	西之表市	Kagoshima	14,809	205.66	72.0	1958-10-01	
Tarumizu	垂水市	Kagoshima	18,078	162.01	112	1958-10-01	
Satsumasendai	薩摩川内市	Kagoshima	100,730	683.50	147	2004-10-12	
Hioki	日置市	Kagoshima	51,472	253.06	203	2005-05-01	
Soo	曽於市	Kagoshima	41,179	390.39	105	2005-07-01	
Ichikikushikino	いちき串木野市	Kagoshima	32,079	112.04	286	2005-10-11	
Kirishima	霧島市	Kagoshima	127,726	603.68	212	2005-11-07	
Shibushi	志布志市	Kagoshima	34,105	289.93	118	2006-01-01	
Amami	奄美市	Kagoshima	48,116	306.20	157	2006-03-20	
Minamikyūshū	南九州市	Kagoshima	40,891	357.85	114	2007-12-01	
Isa	伊佐市	Kagoshima	30,070	392.36	76.64	2008-11-01	
Aira	姶良市	Kagoshima	74,611	231.32	323	2010-03-23	
Yokohama	横浜市	Kanagawa	3,732,616	437.38	8,500	1889-04-01	
Yokosuka	横須賀市	Kanagawa	421,397	100.68	4,186	1907-02-15	
Kawasaki	川崎市	Kanagawa	1,531,646	142.70	9,626	1924-07-01	
Hiratsuka	平塚市	Kanagawa	260,419	67.83	3,839	1932-04-01	
Kamakura	鎌倉市	Kanagawa	173,588	39.60	4,384	1939-11-03	
Fujisawa	藤沢市	Kanagawa	402,628	69.51	5,792	1940-10-01	
Odawara	小田原市	Kanagawa	198,841	114.09	1,743	1940-12-20	
Chigasaki	茅ヶ崎市	Kanagawa	231,005	35.71	6,469	1947-10-01	
Zushi	逗子市	Kanagawa	58,654	17.34	3,383	1954-04-15	
Sagamihara	相模原市	Kanagawa	723,470	328.84	2,148	1954-11-20	
Miura	三浦市	Kanagawa	49,371	32.28	1,529	1955-01-01	
Hadano	秦野市	Kanagawa	169,201	103.61	1,633	1955-01-01	
Atsugi	厚木市	Kanagawa	225,163	93.83	2,400	1955-02-01	
Yamato	大和市	Kanagawa	223,127	27.06	8,246	1959-02-01	
Isehara	伊勢原市	Kanagawa	100,779	55.52	1,815	1971-03-01	
Ebina	海老名市	Kanagawa	126,035	26.48	4,760	1971-11-01	
Zama	座間市	Kanagawa	127,582	17.58	7,257	1971-11-01	
Minamiashigara	南足柄市	Kanagawa	44,285	76.93	576	1972-04-01	
Ayase	綾瀬市	Kanagawa	82,083	22.28	3,684	1978-11-01	
Kōchi	高知市	Kōchi	342,944	309.22	1,109	1889-04-01	
Sukumo	宿毛市	Kōchi	23,771	286.11	83.1	1954-03-31	
Aki	安芸市	Kōchi	20,555	317.34	64.8	1954-08-01	
Tosashimizu	土佐清水市	Kōchi	12,717	266.34	47.7	1954-08-01	
Susaki	須崎市	Kōchi	25,679	135.46	190	1954-10-01	
Tosa	土佐市	Kōchi	29,726	91.59	325	1959-01-01	
Muroto	室戸市	Kōchi	12,451	248.22	50.2	1959-03-01	
Nankoku	南国市	Kōchi	50,315	125.35	401	1959-10-01	
Shimanto	四万十市	Kōchi	37,182	632.42	58.8	2005-04-10	
Kami	香美市	Kōchi	29,144	538.22	54.1	2006-03-01	
Kōnan	香南市	Kōchi	34,084	126.49	269	2006-03-01	
Kumamoto	熊本市	Kumamoto	738,907	267.23	2,509	1889-04-01	
Yatsushiro	八代市	Kumamoto	134,491	680.59	198	1940-09-01	
Hitoyoshi	人吉市	Kumamoto	36,556	210.55	174	1942-02-11	
Arao	荒尾市	Kumamoto	55,505	57.15	971	1942-04-01	
Minamata	水俣市	Kumamoto	28,123	162.88	173	1949-04-01	
Tamana	玉名市	Kumamoto	70,747	152.55	464	1954-04-01	
Yamaga	山鹿市	Kumamoto	56,741	299.67	189	1954-04-01	
Kikuchi	菊池市	Kumamoto	51,471	276.66	186	1958-08-01	
Uto	宇土市	Kumamoto	37,897	74.19	511	1958-10-01	
Kami-Amakusa	上天草市	Kumamoto	31,051	126.13	246	2004-03-31	
Uki	宇城市	Kumamoto	62,718	188.56	333	2005-01-15	
Aso	阿蘇市	Kumamoto	29,149	376.25	77.5	2005-02-11	
Kōshi	合志市	Kumamoto	53,490	53.17	1,006	2006-02-27	
Amakusa	天草市	Kumamoto	93,047	683.17	136	2006-03-27	
Kyoto	京都市	Kyoto	1,464,890	827.90	1,800	1889-04-01	
Fukuchiyama	福知山市	Kyoto	80,836	552.57	146	1937-04-01	
Maizuru	舞鶴市	Kyoto	90,461	342.15	264	1943-05-27	
Ayabe	綾部市	Kyoto	37,081	347.11	107	1950-08-01	
Uji	宇治市	Kyoto	191,297	67.55	2,832	1951-03-01	
Miyazu	宮津市	Kyoto	20,565	169.32	121	1954-06-01	
Kameoka	亀岡市	Kyoto	93,641	224.90	416	1955-01-01	
Jōyō	城陽市	Kyoto	80,795	32.74	2,468	1972-05-03	
Mukō	向日市	Kyoto	55,137	7.67	7,189	1972-10-01	
Nagaokakyō	長岡京市	Kyoto	79,031	19.18	4,120	1972-10-01	
Yawata	八幡市	Kyoto	73,822	24.37	3,029	1977-11-01	
Kyōtanabe	京田辺市	Kyoto	65,211	42.94	1,519	1997-04-01	
Kyōtango	京丹後市	Kyoto	60,980	501.84	122	2004-04-01	
Nantan	南丹市	Kyoto	35,937	616.31	58.3	2006-06-01	
Kizugawa	木津川市	Kyoto	66,783	85.12	785	2007-03-12	
Yokkaichi	四日市市	Mie	306,584	205.53	1,492	1897-08-01	
Matsusaka	松阪市	Mie	169,571	623.82	272	1933-02-01	
Kuwana	桑名市	Mie	140,816	136.61	1,031	1937-04-01	
Suzuka	鈴鹿市	Mie	197,437	194.67	1,014	1942-12-01	
Nabari	名張市	Mie	81,184	129.76	626	1954-03-31	
Owase	尾鷲市	Mie	21,272	193.16	110	1954-06-20	
Kameyama	亀山市	Mie	50,304	190.91	263	1954-10-01	
Toba	鳥羽市	Mie	22,286	107.98	206	1954-11-01	
Inabe	いなべ市	Mie	46,676	219.58	213	2003-12-01	
Shima	志摩市	Mie	56,758	179.70	316	2004-10-01	
Iga	伊賀市	Mie	99,662	558.17	179	2004-11-01	
Ise	伊勢市	Mie	133,547	208.53	640	2005-11-01	
Kumano	熊野市	Mie	20,477	373.63	54.8	2005-11-01	
Tsu	津市	Mie	289,215	710.81	407	2006-01-01	
Sendai	仙台市	Miyagi	1,091,407	783.54	1,314	1889-04-01	
Ishinomaki	石巻市	Miyagi	163,840	555.77	295	1933-04-01	
Shiogama	塩竈市	Miyagi	58,057	17.86	3,251	1941-11-23	
Shiroishi	白石市	Miyagi	38,629	286.47	135	1954-04-01	
Natori	名取市	Miyagi	69,610	100.06	696	1958-10-01	
Kakuda	角田市	Miyagi	32,559	147.58	221	1958-10-01	
Tagajō	多賀城市	Miyagi	63,200	19.65	3,216	1971-11-01	
Iwanuma	岩沼市	Miyagi	44,595	60.72	734	1971-11-01	
Tome	登米市	Miyagi	86,940	536.38	162	2005-04-01	
Kurihara	栗原市	Miyagi	77,862	804.93	96.7	2005-04-01	
Higashimatsushima	東松島市	Miyagi	43,238	101.86	424	2005-04-01	
Kesennuma	気仙沼市	Miyagi	64,578	226.67	285	2006-03-31	
Ōsaki	大崎市	Miyagi	137,164	796.76	172	2006-03-31	
Tomiya	富谷市	Miyagi	52,491	49.13	1,067	2016-10-10	
Miyazaki	宮崎市	Miyazaki	369,473	596.80	619	1924-04-01	
Miyakonojō	都城市	Miyazaki	169,384	653.31	259	1924-04-01	
Nobeoka	延岡市	Miyazaki	132,480	867.97	153	1933-02-11	
Nichinan	日南市	Miyazaki	43,264	294.46	147	1950-01-01	
Kobayashi	小林市	Miyazaki	40,514	474.23	85.4	1950-04-01	
Hyūga	日向市	Miyazaki	63,066	336.29	188	1951-04-01	
Kushima	串間市	Miyazaki	21,386	294.96	72.5	1954-11-03	
Saito	西都市	Miyazaki	33,290	438.56	75.9	1958-11-01	
Ebino	えびの市	Miyazaki	22,445	283.00	79.3	1970-12-01	
Matsumoto	松本市	Nagano	238,776	978.47	244	1907-05-01	
Okaya	岡谷市	Nagano	53,722	85.14	631	1936-04-01	
Suwa	諏訪市	Nagano	52,671	109.06	483	1941-08-10	
Suzaka	須坂市	Nagano	53,097	149.84	354	1954-04-01	
Komoro	小諸市	Nagano	45,333	98.66	459	1954-04-01	
Komagane	駒ヶ根市	Nagano	34,696	165.92	209	1954-07-01	
Ōmachi	大町市	Nagano	31,276	564.99	55.4	1954-07-01	
Iiyama	飯山市	Nagano	24,155	202.32	119	1954-08-01	
Iida	飯田市	Nagano	107,129	658.76	163	1956-09-30	
Chino	茅野市	Nagano	57,363	266.41	215	1958-08-01	
Shiojiri	塩尻市	Nagano	67,781	290.13	234	1959-04-01	
Nagano	長野市	Nagano	365,950	834.81	438	1966-10-16	
Chikuma	千曲市	Nagano	63,305	119.84	528	2003-09-01	
Tōmi	東御市	Nagano	31,211	112.30	278	2004-04-01	
Nakano	中野市	Nagano	46,295	112.06	413	2005-04-01	
Saku	佐久市	Nagano	100,077	423.99	236	2005-04-01	
Azumino	安曇野市	Nagano	97,084	331.82	293	2005-10-01	
Ueda	上田市	Nagano	161,887	552.00	293	2006-03-06	
Ina	伊那市	Nagano	71,937	667.81	108	2006-03-31	
Nagasaki	長崎市	Nagasaki	448,792	406.37	1,104	1889-04-01	
Sasebo	佐世保市	Nagasaki	254,650	364.00	700	1902-04-01	
Shimabara	島原市	Nagasaki	48,953	82.77	591	1940-04-01	
Ōmura	大村市	Nagasaki	89,650	126.34	710	1942-02-11	
Tsushima	対馬市	Nagasaki	36,347	708.81	51.3	2004-03-01	
Iki	壱岐市	Nagasaki	30,352	138.50	219	2004-03-01	
Gotō	五島市	Nagasaki	42,447	420.77	101	2004-08-01	
Isahaya	諫早市	Nagasaki	142,635	312.24	457	2005-03-01	
Saikai	西海市	Nagasaki	32,737	241.95	135	2005-04-01	
Hirado	平戸市	Nagasaki	36,785	235.63	156	2005-10-01	
Unzen	雲仙市	Nagasaki	48,701	206.92	235	2005-10-11	
Matsuura	松浦市	Nagasaki	26,007	130.35	200	2006-01-01	
Minamishimabara	南島原市	Nagasaki	52,347	169.88	308	2006-03-31	
Nara	奈良市	Nara	367,393	276.84	1,327	1898-02-01	
Yamatotakada	大和高田市	Nara	69,473	16.49	4,213	1948-01-01	
Yamatokōriyama	大和郡山市	Nara	90,223	42.68	2,114	1954-01-01	
Tenri	天理市	Nara	70,702	86.37	819	1954-04-01	
Kashihara	橿原市	Nara	124,679	39.52	3,155	1956-02-11	
Sakurai	桜井市	Nara	60,699	98.92	614	1956-09-01	
Gojō	五條市	Nara	36,002	292.05	123	1957-10-15	
Gose	御所市	Nara	31,160	60.58	514	1958-03-31	
Ikoma	生駒市	Nara	115,359	53.18	2,169	1971-11-01	
Kashiba	香芝市	Nara	72,967	24.23	3,011	1991-10-01	
Katsuragi	葛城市	Nara	35,194	33.73	1,043	2004-10-01	
Uda	宇陀市	Nara	35,895	247.62	145	2006-01-01	
Niigata	新潟市	Niigata	797,591	726.10	1,120	1889-04-01	
Nagaoka	長岡市	Niigata	281,222	840.88	334	1906-04-01	
Kashiwazaki	柏崎市	Niigata	93,506	442.70	211	1940-07-01	
Shibata	新発田市	Niigata	103,490	532.82	194	1947-01-01	
Ojiya	小千谷市	Niigata	39,304	155.12	253	1954-03-10	
Kamo	加茂市	Niigata	30,800	133.68	230	1954-03-10	
Mitsuke	見附市	Niigata	42,139	77.96	541	1954-03-31	
Murakami	村上市	Niigata	30,197	142.12	212	1954-03-31	
Myōkō	妙高市	Niigata	36,837	445.52	82.7	1954-11-01	
Jōetsu	上越市	Niigata	206,175	973.32	212	1971-04-29	
Sado	佐渡市	Niigata	65,037	855.26	76.0	2004-03-01	
Agano	阿賀野市	Niigata	46,158	192.72	240	2004-04-01	
Uonuma	魚沼市	Niigata	42,334	946.93	44.7	2004-11-01	
Minamiuonuma	南魚沼市	Niigata	62,518	584.82	107	2004-11-01	
Itoigawa	糸魚川市	Niigata	48,653	746.24	65.2	2005-03-19	
Tōkamachi	十日町市	Niigata	60,480	589.92	103	2005-04-01	
Sanjō	三条市	Niigata	103,199	432.01	239	2005-05-01	
Tainai	胎内市	Niigata	32,165	265.18	121	2005-09-01	
Gosen	五泉市	Niigata	55,936	351.87	159	2006-01-01	
Tsubame	燕市	Niigata	82,910	110.88	748	2006-03-20	
Ōita	大分市	Ōita	467,267	501.25	932	1911-04-01	
Beppu	別府市	Ōita	127,345	125.15	1,018	1924-04-01	
Nakatsu	中津市	Ōita	84,179	491.09	171	1929-04-20	
Hita	日田市	Ōita	72,601	666.19	109	1940-12-11	
Saiki	佐伯市	Ōita	78,675	903.44	87.1	1941-04-29	
Usuki	臼杵市	Ōita	42,464	291.07	146	1950-04-01	
Tsukumi	津久見市	Ōita	20,561	79.53	259	1951-04-01	
Taketa	竹田市	Ōita	25,449	477.59	53.3	1954-03-31	
Bungotakada	豊後高田市	Ōita	24,484	206.64	118	1954-05-31	
Usa	宇佐市	Ōita	59,971	439.12	137	1967-04-01	
Bungo-Ōno	豊後大野市	Ōita	40,409	603.36	67.0	2005-03-31	
Kitsuki	杵築市	Ōita	33,465	280.01	120	2005-10-01	
Yufu	由布市	Ōita	35,298	319.16	111	2005-10-01	
Kunisaki	国東市	Ōita	33,473	317.81	105	2006-03-31	
Okayama	岡山市	Okayama	720,841	789.91	887	1889-06-01	
Kurashiki	倉敷市	Okayama	472,452	354.71	1,332	1928-04-01	
Tsuyama	津山市	Okayama	109,493	506.36	216	1929-02-11	
Tamano	玉野市	Okayama	65,723	103.63	634	1940-08-03	
Kasaoka	笠岡市	Okayama	55,987	136.03	412	1952-04-01	
Ibara	井原市	Okayama	44,423	243.36	183	1953-04-01	
Sōja	総社市	Okayama	66,789	212.00	315	1954-03-31	
Takahashi	高梁市	Okayama	37,573	547.01	68.7	1954-05-01	
Niimi	新見市	Okayama	35,022	793.27	44.1	1954-06-01	
Bizen	備前市	Okayama	39,117	258.23	151	1971-04-01	
Setouchi	瀬戸内市	Okayama	38,645	125.53	308	2004-11-01	
Akaiwa	赤磐市	Okayama	43,742	209.43	209	2005-03-07	
Maniwa	真庭市	Okayama	50,405	828.43	60.8	2005-03-31	
Mimasaka	美作市	Okayama	31,550	429.19	73.5	2005-03-31	
Asakuchi	浅口市	Okayama	37,108	66.46	558	2006-03-21	
Naha	那覇市	Okinawa	314,162	39.23	7,963	1921-05-20	
Ishigaki	石垣市	Okinawa	46,489	229.00	195	1947-07-10	
Ginowan	宜野湾市	Okinawa	91,233	19.70	4,569	1962-07-01	
Urasoe	浦添市	Okinawa	108,052	19.09	5,516	1970-07-01	
Nago	名護市	Okinawa	60,598	210.30	278	1970-08-01	
Itoman	糸満市	Okinawa	56,171	46.63	1,200	1971-12-01	
Okinawa	沖縄市	Okinawa	128,421	49.00	2,565	1974-04-01	
Tomigusuku	豊見城市	Okinawa	54,586	19.45	2,751	2002-04-01	
Uruma	うるま市	Okinawa	114,087	86.03	1,313	2005-04-01	
Miyakojima	宮古島市	Okinawa	52,777	204.54	275	2005-10-01	
Nanjō	南城市	Okinawa	39,458	49.70	819	2006-01-01	
Osaka	大阪市	Osaka	2,691,185	222.30	11,900	1889-04-01	
Sakai	堺市	Osaka	828,741	149.99	5,569	1889-04-01	
Kishiwada	岸和田市	Osaka	200,538	72.24	2,776	1922-11-01	
Toyonaka	豊中市	Osaka	387,269	36.38	10,645	1936-10-15	
Ikeda	池田市	Osaka	104,426	22.09	4,727	1939-04-29	
Suita	吹田市	Osaka	354,600	36.11	9,820	1940-04-01	
Izumiōtsu	泉大津市	Osaka	78,014	12.80	6,095	1942-04-01	
Takatsuki	高槻市	Osaka	354,228	105.31	3,364	1943-01-01	
Kaizuka	貝塚市	Osaka	90,447	43.99	2,056	1943-05-01	
Moriguchi	守口市	Osaka	146,294	12.73	11,492	1946-11-01	
Hirakata	枚方市	Osaka	406,201	65.08	6,242	1947-08-01	
Ibaraki	茨木市	Osaka	272,240	76.52	3,558	1948-01-01	
Yao	八尾市	Osaka	273,244	41.71	6,551	1948-04-01	
Izumisano	泉佐野市	Osaka	99,636	55.03	1,811	1948-04-01	
Tondabayashi	富田林市	Osaka	122,205	39.66	3,081	1950-04-01	
Neyagawa	寝屋川市	Osaka	239,029	24.73	9,666	1951-05-03	
Kawachinagano	河内長野市	Osaka	114,428	109.61	1,044	1954-04-01	
Matsubara	松原市	Osaka	125,274	16.66	7,519	1955-02-01	
Daitō	大東市	Osaka	125,847	18.27	6,888	1956-04-01	
Izumi	和泉市	Osaka	179,352	84.98	2,110	1956-09-01	
Minoh	箕面市	Osaka	127,757	47.84	2,671	1956-12-01	
Kashiwara	柏原市	Osaka	75,875	25.39	2,988	1958-10-01	
Habikino	羽曳野市	Osaka	118,281	26.44	4,474	1959-01-15	
Kadoma	門真市	Osaka	130,026	12.28	10,588	1963-08-01	
Settsu	摂津市	Osaka	84,330	14.88	5,667	1966-11-01	
Takaishi	高石市	Osaka	60,077	11.35	5,293	1966-11-01	
Fujiidera	藤井寺市	Osaka	65,892	8.89	7,412	1966-11-01	
Higashiōsaka	東大阪市	Osaka	509,157	61.81	8,237	1967-02-01	
Sennan	泉南市	Osaka	64,916	48.48	1,339	1970-07-01	
Shijōnawate	四條畷市	Osaka	57,239	18.74	3,054	1970-07-01	
Katano	交野市	Osaka	77,853	25.55	3,047	1971-11-03	
Ōsakasayama	大阪狭山市	Osaka	58,661	11.86	4,946	1987-10-01	
Hannan	阪南市	Osaka	56,853	36.10	1,575	1991-10-01	
Tosu	鳥栖市	Saga	66,842	71.73	932	1954-04-01	
Imari	伊万里市	Saga	57,604	254.99	226	1954-04-01	
Kashima	鹿島市	Saga	31,326	112.10	279	1954-04-01	
Taku	多久市	Saga	22,165	96.93	229	1954-05-01	
Karatsu	唐津市	Saga	129,194	487.45	265	2005-01-01	
Ogi	小城市	Saga	45,516	95.85	475	2005-03-01	
Saga	佐賀市	Saga	239,932	431.42	556	2005-10-01	
Ureshino	嬉野市	Saga	29,644	126.51	234	2006-01-01	
Takeo	武雄市	Saga	50,788	195.44	260	2006-03-01	
Kanzaki	神埼市	Saga	33,449	125.01	268	2006-03-20	
Kawagoe	川越市	Saitama	335,693	109.16	3,075	1922-12-01	
Kawaguchi	川口市	Saitama	552,883	61.97	8,922	1933-04-01	
Gyōda	行田市	Saitama	87,462	67.37	1,298	1949-05-03	
Chichibu	秩父市	Saitama	69,139	577.69	120	1950-04-01	
Tokorozawa	所沢市	Saitama	338,560	71.99	4,703	1950-11-03	
Hannō	飯能市	Saitama	84,053	193.16	435	1954-01-01	
Kazo	加須市	Saitama	67,862	59.40	1,142	1954-05-03	
Higashimatsuyama	東松山市	Saitama	90,840	65.33	1,390	1954-07-01	
Sayama	狭山市	Saitama	156,634	49.04	3,194	1954-07-01	
Hanyū	羽生市	Saitama	56,820	58.55	970	1954-09-01	
Kōnosu	鴻巣市	Saitama	119,768	67.49	1,775	1954-09-30	
Ageo	上尾市	Saitama	222,479	45.55	4,884	1958-07-15	
Sōka	草加市	Saitama	237,964	27.42	8,678	1958-11-01	
Koshigaya	越谷市	Saitama	318,592	60.31	5,283	1958-11-03	
Warabi	蕨市	Saitama	70,410	5.10	13,806	1959-04-01	
Toda	戸田市	Saitama	118,591	18.17	6,527	1966-10-01	
Iruma	入間市	Saitama	148,203	44.74	3,313	1966-11-01	
Asaka	朝霞市	Saitama	126,902	18.38	6,904	1967-03-15	
Shiki	志木市	Saitama	68,531	9.06	7,564	1970-10-26	
Wakō	和光市	Saitama	78,575	11.04	7,117	1970-10-31	
Niiza	新座市	Saitama	155,926	22.80	6,839	1970-11-01	
Okegawa	桶川市	Saitama	74,703	25.26	2,957	1970-11-03	
Kuki	久喜市	Saitama	71,667	25.35	2,827	1971-10-01	
Kitamoto	北本市	Saitama	69,903	19.84	3,523	1971-11-03	
Yashio	八潮市	Saitama	78,601	18.03	4,359	1972-01-15	
Fujimi	富士見市	Saitama	105,286	19.70	5,344	1972-04-10	
Misato	三郷市	Saitama	128,956	30.16	4,276	1972-05-03	
Hasuda	蓮田市	Saitama	63,375	27.27	2,324	1972-10-01	
Sakado	坂戸市	Saitama	99,680	40.97	2,433	1976-09-01	
Satte	幸手市	Saitama	53,485	33.95	1,575	1986-10-01	
Tsurugashima	鶴ヶ島市	Saitama	70,131	17.73	3,955	1991-09-01	
Hidaka	日高市	Saitama	55,454	47.50	1,167	1991-10-01	
Yoshikawa	吉川市	Saitama	63,050	31.62	1,994	1996-04-01	
Saitama	さいたま市	Saitama	1,324,854	217.49	5,483	2001-05-01	
Kumagaya	熊谷市	Saitama	204,853	159.88	1,281	2005-10-01	
Kasukabe	春日部市	Saitama	236,854	65.98	3,590	2005-10-01	
Fujimino	ふじみ野市	Saitama	103,724	14.67	7,070	2005-10-01	
Fukaya	深谷市	Saitama	146,128	137.58	1,062	2006-01-01	
Honjō	本庄市	Saitama	81,805	89.71	912	2006-01-10	
Shiraoka	白岡市	Saitama	51,684	24.92	2,070	2012-10-01	
Ōtsu	大津市	Shiga	329,024	464.10	709	1898-10-01	
Hikone	彦根市	Shiga	110,945	196.84	564	1937-02-11	
Kusatsu	草津市	Shiga	123,512	67.92	1,818	1954-10-15	
Moriyama	守山市	Shiga	74,263	54.81	1,355	1970-07-01	
Rittō	栗東市	Shiga	62,353	52.75	1,182	2001-10-01	
Kōka	甲賀市	Shiga	94,007	481.69	195	2004-10-01	
Yasu	野洲市	Shiga	49,821	81.07	615	2004-10-01	
Konan	湖南市	Shiga	55,144	70.49	782	2004-10-01	
Takashima	高島市	Shiga	52,967	693.00	76.4	2005-01-01	
Higashiōmi	東近江市	Shiga	117,487	388.58	302	2005-02-11	
Maibara	米原市	Shiga	40,757	250.46	163	2005-02-14	
Nagahama	長浜市	Shiga	113,079	681.02	166	2006-02-13	
Ōmihachiman	近江八幡市	Shiga	81,456	177.45	459	2010-03-21	
Matsue	松江市	Shimane	195,875	530.27	369	1889-04-01	
Izumo	出雲市	Shimane	146,115	543.48	269	1941-11-03	
Masuda	益田市	Shimane	50,980	733.16	69.5	1952-08-01	
Yasugi	安来市	Shimane	42,997	420.97	102	1954-04-01	
Gōtsu	江津市	Shimane	26,958	268.51	100	1954-04-01	
Unnan	雲南市	Shimane	43,269	553.37	78.2	2004-11-01	
Hamada	浜田市	Shimane	61,325	689.60	88.9	2005-10-01	
Ōda	大田市	Shimane	39,593	436.11	90.8	2005-10-01	
Shizuoka	静岡市	Shizuoka	710,944	1,388.78	512	1889-04-01	
Hamamatsu	浜松市	Shizuoka	780,128	1,511.17	537	1911-07-01	
Numazu	沼津市	Shizuoka	206,818	187.11	1,105	1923-07-01	
Atami	熱海市	Shizuoka	40,524	61.56	658	1937-04-10	
Mishima	三島市	Shizuoka	112,320	62.13	1,808	1941-04-29	
Fujinomiya	富士宮市	Shizuoka	122,122	314.81	388	1942-06-01	
Itō	伊東市	Shizuoka	72,038	124.13	580	1947-08-10	
Shimada	島田市	Shizuoka	95,762	195.40	490	1948-01-01	
Iwata	磐田市	Shizuoka	172,583	164.08	1,052	1948-04-01	
Yaizu	焼津市	Shizuoka	120,331	46.01	2,615	1951-03-01	
Kakegawa	掛川市	Shizuoka	118,660	265.63	447	1954-03-31	
Fujieda	藤枝市	Shizuoka	129,637	140.74	921	1954-03-31	
Gotemba	御殿場市	Shizuoka	88,078	194.63	453	1955-02-11	
Fukuroi	袋井市	Shizuoka	85,163	108.56	784	1958-11-03	
Fuji	富士市	Shizuoka	237,279	214.10	1,108	1966-11-01	
Shimoda	下田市	Shizuoka	25,784	104.70	246	1971-01-01	
Susono	裾野市	Shizuoka	53,740	138.39	388	1971-01-01	
Kosai	湖西市	Shizuoka	44,545	55.08	809	1972-01-01	
Izu	伊豆市	Shizuoka	35,911	363.97	98.7	2004-04-01	
Omaezaki	御前崎市	Shizuoka	35,015	65.85	532	2004-04-01	
Kikugawa	菊川市	Shizuoka	47,702	94.24	506	2005-01-17	
Izunokuni	伊豆の国市	Shizuoka	49,711	94.71	525	2005-04-01	
Makinohara	牧之原市	Shizuoka	49,726	111.50	446	2005-10-11	
Utsunomiya	宇都宮市	Tochigi	507,833	416.84	1,218	1896-04-01	
Ashikaga	足利市	Tochigi	157,793	177.82	887	1921-01-01	
Tochigi	栃木市	Tochigi	81,601	122.06	669	1937-04-01	
Kanuma	鹿沼市	Tochigi	103,690	490.62	211	1948-10-10	
Oyama	小山市	Tochigi	162,283	171.61	946	1954-03-31	
Mooka	真岡市	Tochigi	66,705	111.76	597	1954-10-01	
Ōtawara	大田原市	Tochigi	78,563	354.12	222	1954-12-01	
Yaita	矢板市	Tochigi	35,462	170.66	208	1958-11-01	
Nasushiobara	那須塩原市	Tochigi	115,633	592.82	195	2005-01-01	
Sano	佐野市	Tochigi	123,034	356.07	346	2005-02-28	
Sakura	さくら市	Tochigi	42,403	125.46	338	2005-03-28	
Nasukarasuyama	那須烏山市	Tochigi	30,433	174.42	174	2005-10-01	
Shimotsuke	下野市	Tochigi	59,459	74.58	797	2006-01-10	
Nikkō	日光市	Tochigi	92,181	1,449.87	63.6	2006-03-20	
Tokushima	徳島市	Tokushima	266,370	191.39	1,392	1889-10-01	
Naruto	鳴門市	Tokushima	62,453	135.46	461	1947-03-15	
Komatsushima	小松島市	Tokushima	41,540	45.24	918	1951-06-01	
Anan	阿南市	Tokushima	77,099	279.39	276	1958-05-01	
Yoshinogawa	吉野川市	Tokushima	44,905	144.19	311	2004-10-01	
Mima	美馬市	Tokushima	33,520	367.38	91.2	2005-03-01	
Awa	阿波市	Tokushima	40,303	190.97	211	2005-04-01	
Miyoshi	三好市	Tokushima	30,998	721.48	42.96	2006-03-01	
Hachiōji	八王子市	Tokyo	567,367	186.31	3,045	1917-09-01	
Tachikawa	立川市	Tokyo	175,639	24.38	7,204	1940-12-01	
Musashino	武蔵野市	Tokyo	138,516	10.73	12,909	1947-11-03	
Mitaka	三鷹市	Tokyo	180,797	16.50	10,957	1950-11-03	
Ōme	青梅市	Tokyo	141,708	103.26	1,372	1951-04-01	
Fuchū	府中市	Tokyo	248,445	29.34	8,468	1954-04-01	
Akishima	昭島市	Tokyo	111,763	17.33	6,449	1954-05-01	
Chōfu	調布市	Tokyo	219,053	21.53	10,174	1955-04-01	
Machida	町田市	Tokyo	413,786	71.63	5,777	1958-02-01	
Koganei	小金井市	Tokyo	115,116	11.33	10,160	1958-10-01	
Kodaira	小平市	Tokyo	185,829	20.46	9,083	1962-10-01	
Hino	日野市	Tokyo	179,482	27.53	6,520	1963-11-03	
Higashimurayama	東村山市	Tokyo	146,585	17.17	8,537	1964-04-01	
Kokubunji	国分寺市	Tokyo	118,801	11.48	10,349	1964-11-03	
Kunitachi	国立市	Tokyo	73,362	8.15	9,001	1967-01-01	
Fussa	福生市	Tokyo	60,413	10.24	5,900	1970-07-01	
Komae	狛江市	Tokyo	78,237	6.39	12,244	1970-10-01	
Higashiyamato	東大和市	Tokyo	81,445	13.54	6,015	1970-10-01	
Kiyose	清瀬市	Tokyo	73,518	10.19	7,215	1970-10-01	
Higashikurume	東久留米市	Tokyo	115,405	12.92	8,932	1970-10-01	
Musashimurayama	武蔵村山市	Tokyo	68,333	15.37	4,446	1970-11-03	
Tama	多摩市	Tokyo	149,404	21.08	7,087	1971-11-01	
Inagi	稲城市	Tokyo	80,772	17.97	4,495	1971-11-01	
Hamura	羽村市	Tokyo	56,984	9.91	5,750	1991-11-01	
Akiruno	あきる野市	Tokyo	80,268	73.34	1,094	1995-09-01	
Nishitōkyō	西東京市	Tokyo	207,270	15.85	13,160	2001-01-21	
Tokyo (Note: Combined population of the 23 special wards of Tokyo, corresponding to the pre-1943 Tokyo City)	東京特別区部	Tokyo	9,878,284	627.51	15,742	1943-07-01	
Adachi	足立区	Tokyo	629,392	53.20	11,830	1947-03-13	
Arakawa	荒川区	Tokyo	194,777	10.20	18,262	1947-03-13	
Bunkyō	文京区	Tokyo	194,933	11.31	16,009	1947-03-13	
Chiyoda	千代田区	Tokyo	43,802	11.64	3,763	1947-03-13	
Chūō	中央区	Tokyo	104,997	10.15	10,344	1947-03-13	
Edogawa	江戸川区	Tokyo	661,386	49.86	13,264	1947-03-13	
Itabashi	板橋区	Tokyo	529,059	32.17	16,445	1947-03-13	
Katsushika	葛飾区	Tokyo	428,066	34.84	12,286	1947-03-13	
Kita	北区	Tokyo	330,646	20.59	15,885	1947-03-13	
Kōtō	江東区	Tokyo	436,337	39.80	10,963	1947-03-13	
Meguro	目黒区	Tokyo	267,798	14.70	18,217	1947-03-13	
Minato	港区	Tokyo	205,196	20.34	10,088	1947-03-13	
Nakano	中野区	Tokyo	312,939	15.59	20,097	1947-03-13	
Nerima	練馬区	Tokyo	744,026	48.16	14,580	1947-08-01	
Ōta	大田区	Tokyo	716,413	59.46	11,345	1947-03-13	
Setagaya	世田谷区	Tokyo	939,099	58.08	14,728	1947-03-13	
Shibuya	渋谷区	Tokyo	205,512	15.11	13,337	1947-03-13	
Shinagawa	品川区	Tokyo	353,887	22.72	15,576	1947-03-13	
Shinjuku	新宿区	Tokyo	309,463	18.23	16,975	1947-03-13	
Suginami	杉並区	Tokyo	534,981	34.02	15,725	1947-03-13	
Sumida	墨田区	Tokyo	237,433	13.75	16,079	1947-03-13	
Taitō	台東区	Tokyo	168,277	10.08	16,139	1947-03-13	
Toshima	豊島区	Tokyo	256,009	13.01	19,428	1947-03-13	
Tottori	鳥取市	Tottori	200,315	765.66	262	1889-10-01	
Yonago	米子市	Tottori	149,140	132.21	1,128	1927-04-01	
Kurayoshi	倉吉市	Tottori	51,453	272.15	189	1953-10-01	
Sakaiminato	境港市	Tottori	35,908	28.79	1,247	1956-04-01	
Toyama	富山市	Toyama	421,116	1,241.85	339	1889-04-01	
Uozu	魚津市	Toyama	45,945	200.63	229	1952-04-01	
Himi	氷見市	Toyama	53,316	230.47	231	1952-08-01	
Namerikawa	滑川市	Toyama	33,789	54.61	619	1954-03-01	
Tonami	砺波市	Toyama	49,396	126.96	389	1954-04-01	
Oyabe	小矢部市	Toyama	32,656	134.11	244	1962-08-01	
Nanto	南砺市	Toyama	57,061	668.86	85.3	2004-11-01	
Takaoka	高岡市	Toyama	178,965	209.38	855	2005-11-01	
Imizu	射水市	Toyama	94,691	109.18	867	2005-11-01	
Kurobe	黒部市	Toyama	42,612	426.34	99.9	2006-03-31	
Wakayama	和歌山市	Wakayama	372,175	209.23	1,779	1889-04-01	
Kainan	海南市	Wakayama	55,877	101.18	552	1934-05-01	
Tanabe	田辺市	Wakayama	80,478	1,026.77	78.4	1942-05-20	
Gobō	御坊市	Wakayama	26,335	43.93	599	1954-04-01	
Arida	有田市	Wakayama	31,194	36.92	845	1956-05-01	
Shingū	新宮市	Wakayama	32,654	255.43	128	2005-10-01	
Kinokawa	紀の川市	Wakayama	67,192	228.24	294	2005-11-07	
Hashimoto	橋本市	Wakayama	67,505	130.31	518	2006-03-01	
Iwade	岩出市	Wakayama	51,843	38.50	1,347	2006-04-01	
Yamagata	山形市	Yamagata	255,370	381.34	670	1889-04-01	
Yonezawa	米沢市	Yamagata	91,704	548.74	167	1889-04-01	
Shinjō	新庄市	Yamagata	39,808	223.08	178	1949-04-01	
Sagae	寒河江市	Yamagata	43,299	139.08	311	1954-08-01	
Kaminoyama	上山市	Yamagata	35,086	240.95	146	1954-10-01	
Murayama	村山市	Yamagata	27,586	196.83	140	1954-11-01	
Nagai	長井市	Yamagata	30,285	214.69	141	1954-11-15	
Tendō	天童市	Yamagata	63,470	113.01	562	1958-10-01	
Higashine	東根市	Yamagata	46,141	207.17	223	1958-11-03	
Obanazawa	尾花沢市	Yamagata	19,937	372.32	53.5	1959-04-10	
Nan'yō	南陽市	Yamagata	34,542	160.70	215	1967-04-01	
Tsuruoka	鶴岡市	Yamagata	140,097	1,311.51	107	2005-10-01	
Sakata	酒田市	Yamagata	114,964	602.79	191	2005-11-01	
Ube	宇部市	Yamaguchi	176,370	287.69	613	1921-11-01	
Hōfu	防府市	Yamaguchi	116,393	188.59	617	1936-08-25	
Kudamatsu	下松市	Yamaguchi	54,026	89.36	605	1939-11-03	
Shūnan	周南市	Yamaguchi	150,299	656.25	229	2003-04-21	
Hikari	光市	Yamaguchi	53,274	91.94	579	2004-10-04	
Shimonoseki	下関市	Yamaguchi	286,073	716.06	400	2005-02-13	
Yanai	柳井市	Yamaguchi	35,438	139.90	253	2005-02-21	
Hagi	萩市	Yamaguchi	55,831	698.87	79.9	2005-03-06	
Nagato	長門市	Yamaguchi	39,825	357.92	111	2005-03-22	
San'yō-Onoda	山陽小野田市	Yamaguchi	65,523	132.99	493	2005-03-22	
Yamaguchi	山口市	Yamaguchi	192,008	730.23	263	2005-10-01	
Iwakuni	岩国市	Yamaguchi	146,885	872.71	168	2006-03-20	
Mine	美祢市	Yamaguchi	23,140	234.56	98.7	2008-03-21	
Kōfu	甲府市	Yamanashi	199,374	212.41	939	1889-07-01	
Fujiyoshida	富士吉田市	Yamanashi	51,879	121.83	426	1951-03-20	
Tsuru	都留市	Yamanashi	34,439	161.58	213	1954-04-29	
Ōtsuki	大月市	Yamanashi	29,869	280.30	107	1954-08-08	
Nirasaki	韮崎市	Yamanashi	33,539	143.73	233	1954-10-10	
Minami-Alps	南アルプス市	Yamanashi	72,295	264.06	274	2003-04-01	
Kai	甲斐市	Yamanashi	74,077	71.94	1,030	2004-09-01	
Fuefuki	笛吹市	Yamanashi	71,184	201.92	353	2004-10-12	
Hokuto	北杜市	Yamanashi	47,754	602.89	79.2	2004-11-01	
Uenohara	上野原市	Yamanashi	28,295	170.65	166	2005-02-13	
Yamanashi	山梨市	Yamanashi	38,202	289.87	132	2005-03-22	
Kōshū	甲州市	Yamanashi	35,072	264.01	133	2005-11-01	
Chūō	中央市	Yamanashi	31,875	31.81	1,002	2006-02-20	

== Dissolved cities ==
City	Japanese	Prefecture	Founded	Dissolved	Merged division
Fushimi	伏見市	Kyōto	1929-05-01	1931-04-01	merged into Kyōto as Fushimi ward
Higashimaizuru	東舞鶴市	Kyōto	1938-08-01	1943-05-27	merged with Maizuru
Shikama	飾磨市	Hyōgo	1940-02-11	1946-03-01	merged with Himeji
Moriyama	守山市	Aichi	1954-06-01	1963-02-15	merged into Nagoya
Bisai	尾西市	Aichi	1955-01-01	2005-04-01	merged into Ichinomiya
Shinshiro (previous)	新城市	Aichi	1958-11-01	2005-10-01	merged with Hōrai, Tsukude → Shinshiro (current)
Tsurusaki	鶴崎市	Ōita	1954-03-31	1963-03-10	Merged with Ōita
Honjō	本荘市	Akita	1954-03-31	2005-05-22	merged with Chōkai, Higashiyuri, Iwaki, Nishime, Ōuchi, Yashima, Yuri → Yurihonjō
Ōmagari	大曲市	Akita	1954-05-03	2005-03-22	merged with Kamioka, Kyōwa, Nakasen, Nishisenboku, Ōta, Semboku, Nangai → Daisen
Yuzawa (previous)	湯沢市	Akita	1954-03-31	2005-03-22	merged with Inakawa, Minase, Ogachi → Yuzawa (current)
Oga (previous)	男鹿市	Akita	1954-03-31	2005-03-22	merged with Wakami → Oga (current)
Yokote (previous)	横手市	Akita	1951-04-01	2005-10-01	merged with Hiraka+Jūmonji, Masuda, Omonogawa, Ōmori, Sannai, Taiyū → Yokote (current)
Noshiro (previous)	能代市	Akita	1940-10-01	2005-10-01	merged with Futatsui → Noshiro (current)
Towada (previous)	十和田市	Aomori	1955-02-01	2005-03-28	merged with Towadako → Towada (current)
Goshogawara (previous)	五所川原市	Aomori	1955-02-01	2005-03-28	merged with Kanagi, Shiura → Goshogawara (current)
Aomori (previous)	青森市	Aomori	1898-04-01	2005-04-01	merged with Namioka → Aomori (current)
Hirosaki (previous)	弘前市	Aomori	1889-04-01	2006-11-15	merged with Iwaki, Sōma → Hirosaki (current)
Ichihara (previous)	市原市	Chiba	1963-05-01	1967-10-01	merged with Nansō, Kamo → Ichihara (current)
Mobara (previous)	茂原市	Chiba	1952-04-01	1972-05-01	merged with Honnō → Mobara (current)
Kamogawa (previous)	鴨川市	Chiba	1971-03-31	2005-02-11	merged with Amatsukominato → Kamogawa (current)
Asahi (previous)	旭市	Chiba	1954-07-01	2005-07-01	merged with Hikata, Iioka, Unakami → Asahi (current)
Yōkaichiba	八日市場市	Chiba	1954-07-01	2006-01-23	merged with Nosaka → Sōsa
Sawara	佐原市	Chiba	1951-03-15	2006-03-27	merged with Kurimoyo, Omigawa, Yamada → Katori
Iyomishima	伊予三島市	Ehime	1954-11-01	2004-04-01	merged with Kawanoe, Doi, Shingū → Shikokuchūō
Kawanoe	川之江市	Ehime	1954-11-01	2004-04-01	merged with Iyomishima, Doi, Shingū → Shikokuchūō
Saijō (previous)	西条市	Ehime	1941-04-29	2004-11-01	merged with Tōyo, Komatsu, Tanbara → Saijō (current)
Tōyo	東予市	Ehime	1972-10-01	2004-11-01	merged with Saij, Komatsu, Tanbara → Saijō (current)
Shinonoi	篠ノ井市	Nagano	1959-05-01	1966-10-16	merged with Nagano
Hōjō	北条市	Ehime	1958-11-01	2005-01-01	merged into Matsuyama
Ōzu (previous)	大洲市	Ehime	1954-09-01	2005-01-11	merged with Hijikawa, Nagahama, Kawabe → Ōzu (current)
Imabari (previous)	今治市	Ehime	1920-02-11	2005-01-16	merged with Hakata, Kamiura, Kikuma, Miyakubo, Namikata, Ōmishima Ōnishi, Tamagawa, Yoshiumi, Asakura, Sekizen → Imabari (current)
Yawatahama (previous)	八幡浜市	Ehime	1935-02-11	2005-04-01	merged with Honai → Yawatahama (current)
Iyo (previous)	伊予市	Ehime	1955-01-01	2005-04-01	merged with Nakayama, Futami → Iyo (current)
Uwajima (previous)	宇和島市	Ehime	1921-08-01	2005-08-01	merged with Mima, Tsushima, Yoshida → Uwajima (current)
Takefu	武生市	Fukui	1948-04-01	2005-10-01	merged with Imadate → Echizen
Moji	門司市	Fukuoka	1899-04-01	1963-02-10	merged with Kokura, Tobata, Yahata, Wakamatsu → Kitakyushu
Kokura	小倉市	Fukuoka	1900-04-01	1963-02-10	merged with Moji, Tobata, Yahata, Wakamatsu → Kitakyushu
Tobata	戸畑市	Fukuoka	1924-09-01	1963-02-10	merged with Moji, Kokura, Yahata, Wakamatsu → Kitakyushu
Yahata	八幡市	Fukuoka	1917-03-01	1963-02-10	merged with Moji, Kokura, Tobata, Wakamatsu → Kitakyushu
Wakamatsu	若松市	Fukuoka	1914-04-01	1963-02-10	merged with Moji, Kokura, Tobata, Yahata → Kitakyushu
Fuse	布施市	Ōsaka	1937-04-01	1967-02-01	merged with Hiraoka, Kawachi → Higashiōsaka
Hiraoka	枚岡市	Ōsaka	1955-01-11	1967-02-01	merged with Fuse, Kawachi → Higashiōsaka
Kawachi	河内市	Ōsaka	1955-01-15	1967-02-01	merged with Hiraoka, Fuse → Higashiōsaka
Iizuka (previous A)	飯塚市	Fukuoka	1932-01-20	1963-04-01	merged with Kobukuro, Futase, Chinzei → Iizuka (previous B)
Munakata	宗像市	Fukuoka	1981-04-01	2003-04-01	merged with Genkai → Munakata (current)
Yanagawa	柳川市	Fukuoka	1952-04-01	2005-03-21	merged with Yamato, Mitsuhashi → Yanagawa (current)
Amagi	甘木市	Fukuoka	1954-04-01	2006-03-20	merged with Asakura, Haki → Asakura
Iizuka (previous B)	飯塚市	Fukuoka	1963-04-01	2006-03-26	merged with Chikuho, Honami, Kaita, Shōnai → Iizuka (current)
Yoshiwara	吉原市	Shizuoka	1948-04-01	1966.11.01	merged with Fuji
Yamada	山田市	Fukuoka	1954-04-01	2006-03-27	merged with Inatsuki, Kaho, Usui → Kama
Maebaru	前原市	Fukuoka	1992-10-01	2010-01-01	merged with Nijō, Shima → Itoshima
Kōriyama (previous)	郡山市	Fukushima	1924-09-01	1965-05-01	merged with Nishida, Nakata → Kōriyama (current)
Taira	平市	Fukushima	1937-06-01	1966-10-01	merged with Iwaki (previous), Jōban, Uchigō, Nakoso → Iwaki (current)
Iwaki (previous)	磐城市	Fukushima	1954-03-31	1966-10-01	merged with Taira, Jōban, Uchigō, Nakoso → Iwaki (current)
Jōban	常磐市	Fukushima	1954-03-31	1966-10-01	merged with Taira, Iwaki (previous), Uchigō, Nakoso → Iwaki (current)
Uchigō	内郷市	Fukushima	1954-10-01	1966-10-01	merged with Taira, Iwaki (previous), Jōban, Nakoso → Iwaki (current)
Nakoso	勿来市	Fukushima	1955-04-29	1966-10-01	merged with Taira, Iwaki (previous), Jōban, Uchigō → Iwaki (current)
Shirakawa (previous)	白河市	Fukushima	1949-04-01	2005-11-07	merged with Taishin, Higashi, Omotegō → Shirakawa (current)
Nihonmatsu (previous)	二本松市	Fukushima	1958-10-01	2005-12-01	merged with Adachi, Iwashiro, Tōwa → Nihonmatsu (current)
Haramachi	原町市	Fukushima	1954-03-20	2006-01-01	merged with Kashima, Odaka → Minamisōma
Kitakata (previous)	喜多方市	Fukushima	1954-03-31	2006-01-04	merged with Shiokawa, Yamato, Atsushiokanō, Takasato → Kitakata (current)
Ena (previous)	恵那市	Gifu	1954-04-01	2004-10-25	merged with Akechi, Iwamura, Kamiyahagi, Yamaoka, Kushihara → Ena (current)
Isesaki (previous)	伊勢崎市	Gunma	1940-09-13	2005-01-01	merged with Akabori, Sakai, Azuma → Isesaki (current)
Ōta (previous)	太田市	Gunma	1948-05-03	2005-03-28	merged with Nitta, Ojima, Yabuzukahon → Ōta (current)
Shibukawa (previous)	渋川市	Gunma	1954-04-01	2006-02-20	merged with Ikaho, Komochi, Onogami, Akagi, Kitatachibana → Shibukawa (current)
Annaka (previous)	安中市	Gunma	1958-11-01	2006-03-18	merged with Matsuida → Annaka (current)
Tomioka (previous)	富岡市	Gunma	1954-04-01	2006-03-27	merged with Myōgi → Tomioka (current)
Fukuyama (previous)	福山市	Hiroshima	1916-07-01	1966-05-01	merged with Matsunaga → Fukuyama (current)
Matsunaga	松永市	Hiroshima	1954-03-31	1966-05-01	merged with Fukuyama (previous) → Fukuyama (current)
Miyoshi	三次市	Hiroshima	1954-03-31	2004-04-01	merged with Kisa, Mirasaka, Miwa, Funo, Kimita, Sakugi, Kōnu → Miyoshi (current)
Mihara	三原市	Hiroshima	1936-11-15	2005-03-22	merged with Daiwa, Kui, Hongō → Mihara (current)
Shōbara	庄原市	Hiroshima	1954-03-31	2005-03-31	merged with Hiwa, Kuchiwa, Saijō, Takano, Tōjō, Sōryō → Shōbara (current)
Innoshima	因島市	Hiroshima	1953-05-01	2006-01-10	merged with Setoda into Onomichi
Kushiro (previous)	釧路市	Hokkaido	1922-08-01	2005-10-11	merged with Akan, Onbetsu → Kushiro (current)
Kitami (previous)	北見市	Hokkaido	1942-06-10	2006-03-05	merged with Rubeshibe, Tanno, Tokoro → Kitami (current)
Shibetsu (previous)	士別市	Hokkaido	1954-07-01	2005-09-01	merged with Asahi → Shibetsu (current)
Nayoro (previous)	名寄市	Hokkaido	1956-04-01	2006-03-27	merged with Fūren → Nayoro (current)
Kameda	亀田市	Hokkaido	1971-11-01	1973-12-01	merged into Hakodate
Amagasaki (previous)	尼崎市	Hyōgo		1936-04-01	
Miki (previous)	三木市	Hyōgo		1954-07-01	
Toyooka (previous)	豊岡市	Hyōgo		2005-04-01	
Nishiwaki (previous)	西脇市	Hyōgo		2005-10-01	
Tatsuno	龍野市	Hyōgo		2005-10-01	
Sumoto (previous)	洲本市	Hyōgo		2006-02-11	
Katsuta	勝田市	Ibaraki		1994-11-01	
Nakaminato	那珂湊市	Ibaraki		1994-11-01	
Iwai	岩井市	Ibaraki		2005-03-22	
Shimodate	下館市	Ibaraki		2005-03-28	
Koga (previous)	古河市	Ibaraki		2005-09-12	
Ishioka (previous)	石岡市	Ibaraki		2005-10-01	
Kasama (previous)	笠間市	Ibaraki		2006-03-19	
Nanao (previous)	七尾市	Ishikawa		2004-10-01	
Mattō	松任市	Ishikawa		2005-02-01	
Kaga (previous)	加賀市	Ishikawa		2005-10-01	
Wajima (previous)	輪島市	Ishikawa		2006-02-01	
Ichinoseki (previous A)	一関市	Iwate		1955-01-01	
Kamaishi (previous)	釜石市	Iwate		1955-04-01	
Kitakami (previous)	北上市	Iwate		1991-04-01	
Miyako (previous)	宮古市	Iwate		2005-06-06	
Ichinoseki (previous B)	一関市	Iwate		2005-09-20	
Tōno (previous)	遠野市	Iwate		2005-10-01	
Hanamaki (previous)	花巻市	Iwate		2006-01-01	
Ninohe (previous)	二戸市	Iwate		2006-01-01	
Mizusawa	水沢市	Iwate		2006-02-20	
Esashi	江刺市	Iwate		2006-02-20	
Kuji (previous)	久慈市	Iwate		2006-03-06	
Marugame (previous)	丸亀市	Kagawa		2005-03-22	
Kan'onji (previous)	観音寺市	Kagawa		2005-10-11	
Kagoshima (previous)	鹿児島市	Kagoshima		1967-04-29	
Taniyama	谷山市	Kagoshima		1967-04-29	
Sendai (previous)	川内市	Kagoshima		2004-10-12	
Kushikino	串木野市	Kagoshima		2005-10-11	
Kaseda	加世田市	Kagoshima		2005-11-07	
Kokubu	国分市	Kagoshima		2005-11-07	
Kanoya (previous)	鹿屋市	Kagoshima		2006-01-01	
Ibusuki (previous)	指宿市	Kagoshima		2006-01-01	
Izumi (previous)	出水市	Kagoshima		2006-03-13	
Naze	名瀬市	Kagoshima		2006-03-20	
Ōkuchi	大口市	Kagoshima		2008-11-01	
Toyohara	豊原市	Karafuto	1937-07-01	1949-06-01	renounced Karafuto sovereign rights to the USSR
Hatogaya	鳩ヶ谷市	Saitama	1967-03-01	2011-10-11	merged into Kawaguchi
Ōmiya	大宮市	Saitama	1940-11-03	2001-05-01	merged into Saitama
Imaichi	今市市	Tochigi	1954-03-31	2006-03-20	merged into Nikkō
Tokyo	東京市	Tokyo-fu	1889-05-01	1943-07-01	merged with Tokyo-fu → Tokyo Metropolis (see Special wards)
Akigawa	秋川市	Tokyo	1972-05-05	1995-09-01	merged with Itsukaichi → Akiruno
Tanashi	田無市	Tokyo	1967-01-01	2001-01-21	merged with Hōya → Nishitōkyō
Hōya	保谷市	Tokyo	1967-01-01	2001-01-21	merged with Tanashi → Nishitōkyō

== Source data ==
Prefecture	Population as of	Reference
Aichi	2008-01-01	
Akita	2008-01-01	
Aomori	2008-01-01	
Chiba	2008-01-01	
Ehime	2008-01-01	
Fukui	2008-01-01	
Fukuoka	2008-01-01	
Fukushima	2008-01-01	
Gifu	2008-01-01	
Gunma	2008-01-01	
Hiroshima	2008-01-01	
Hokkaidō	2012-03-31	
Hyōgo	2008-01-01	
Ibaraki	2008-01-01	
Ishikawa	2008-01-01	
Iwate	2008-01-01	
Kagawa	2008-01-01	
Kagoshima	2008-01-01	
Kanagawa	2008-01-01	
Kōchi	2008-02-29	
Kumamoto	2008-01-01	
Kyoto	2008-01-01	
Mie	2008-01-01	
Miyagi	2008-01-01	
Miyazaki	2008-01-01	
Nagano	2008-01-01	
Nagasaki	2008-01-01	
Nara	2008-01-01	
Niigata	2008-01-01	
Ōita	2008-01-01	
Okayama	2008-01-01	
Okinawa	2008-01-01	
Osaka	2008-01-01	
Saga	2008-01-01	
Saitama	2008-01-01	
Shiga	2008-01-01	
Shimane	2008-01-01	
Shizuoka	2008-01-01	
Tochigi	2008-01-01	
Tokushima	2008-01-01	
Tokyo	2008-01-01	
Tottori	2008-01-01	
Toyama	2008-01-01	
Wakayama	2008-01-01	
Yamagata	2008-01-01	
Yamaguchi	2008-01-01	
Yamanashi	2008-01-01	

- The area figures are according to Geographical Survey Institute of Japan as of 2007-10-01.
- The source websites of each prefectures' populations are according to ja:Template:自治体人口/doc.

== See also ==
- Japanese cities by population (1889)
- Municipalities of Japan
- List of city nicknames in Japan
- List of metropolitan areas in Japan by population
- List of towns in Japan
- List of villages in Japan
