= Special cities of Japan =

Type of city of Japan

(Circle click-able) ■ ― Designated cities ■ ― Core cities ■ ― Special cities

A special city (特例市, Tokureishi) of Japan was a category of cities in Japan in operation until 2015. Each special city had a population of at least 200,000, and was delegated functions normally carried out by prefectural governments. Those functions were a subset of the functions that were delegated to core cities.

The category of special cities was established by the Local Autonomy Law, article 252 clause 26. They were designated by the Cabinet after a request by a city council and a prefectural assembly.

Because the level of autonomy delegated to special cities was similar to that for core cities, after consultation with local governments the category of special cities was abolished in the revision of the Local Autonomy Act enacted on April 1, 2015. Cities with a population of at least 200,000 may now apply to be directly promoted to core city status. Special cities that have not been promoted may still retain autonomy, and are called special cities for the enforcement period (施行時特例市, Shikōji Tokurei shi), but this is regarded as a temporary arrangement.

The special cities were not the same as the special wards of Tokyo. They were also different from the special (designated) cities (特別市, tokubetsu-shi) that were legally established under the Local Autonomy Law between 1947 and 1956, in an arrangement that was never implemented. They would have been prefecture-independent cities (in an analogous way, special wards are city-independent wards). They were the legal successors to the 1922 "six major cities" (roku daitoshi; only five were left in 1947 as Tokyo City had been abolished in the war) and precursors to the 1956 designated major cities that have expanded autonomy, but not full independence from prefectures.

== List of special cities ==
As of 2015, when the category was abolished, 23 cities had been designated special cities:

Name	Japanese	Flag	Emblem	Area (km^{2})	Population (2012)	Date of designation	Region	Prefecture	Map
Atsugi	厚木市			93.83	224,181	2002-04-01	Kantō	Kanagawa	
Chigasaki	茅ヶ崎市			35.71	239,874	2003-04-01	Kantō	Kanagawa	
Fuji	富士市			244.95	245,015	2001-04-01	Chūbu	Shizuoka	
Hiratsuka	平塚市			67.88	260,061	2001-04-01	Kantō	Kanagawa	
Ibaraki	茨木市			76.52	276,474	2001-04-01	Kansai	Osaka	
Isesaki	伊勢崎市			139.44	207,253	2007-04-01	Kantō	Gunma	
Jōetsu	上越市			973.81	202,366	2007-04-01	Chūbu	Niigata	
Kakogawa	加古川市			138.51	268,175	2002-04-01	Kansai	Hyōgo	
Kasugai	春日井市			92.78	306,573	2002-04-01	Chūbu	Aichi	
Kasukabe	春日部市			66.00	236,976	2008-04-01	Kantō	Saitama	
Kishiwada	岸和田市			72.68	197,629	2002-04-01	Kansai	Osaka	
Kumagaya	熊谷市			159.82	201,814	2009-04-01	Kantō	Saitama	
Nagaoka	長岡市			891.06	281,101	2007-04-01	Chūbu	Niigata	
Numazu	沼津市			186.96	199,883	2000-04-01	Chūbu	Shizuoka	
Odawara	小田原市			113.79	194,672	2000-04-01	Kantō	Kanagawa	
Ōta	太田市			175.54	217,107	2007-04-01	Kantō	Gunma	
Saga	佐賀市			431.84	237,501	2014-04-01	Kyushu	Saga	
Sōka	草加市			27.46	244,851	2004-04-01	Kantō	Saitama	
Takarazuka	宝塚市			101.89	227,617	2003-04-01	Kansai	Hyōgo	
Tokorozawa	所沢市			72.11	344,194	2002-04-01	Kantō	Saitama	
Tsukuba	つくば市			283.72	244,528	2007-04-01	Kantō	Ibaraki	
Yamato	大和市			27.09	230,357	2000-04-01	Kantō	Kanagawa	
Yokkaichi	四日市市			206.44	306,107	2000-04-01	Chūbu	Mie	
