= Core cities of Japan =

Type of Japanese city

(Circle click-able) ■ ― Designated cities ■ ― Core cities ■ ― Special cities

A core city (中核市, chūkakushi; Japanese pronunciation: [tɕɯː.ka.kɯ̥ꜜ.ɕi, -kaꜜ.kɯ̥-]) is a class or category of Japanese cities. It is a local administrative division created by the national government. Core cities are delegated many functions normally carried out by prefectural governments, but not as many as designated cities. To become a candidate for core city status, a city must have a population greater than 300,000 and an area greater than 100 square kilometers, although special exceptions may be made by order of the cabinet for cities with populations under 300,000 but over 200,000. After the abolition of special city status on April 1, 2015, any city with a population above 200,000 may apply for core city status.

Application for designation is made by a city with the approval of both the city and prefectural assemblies.

== History ==
The term "core city" was created by the first clause of Article 252, Section 22 of the Local Autonomy Law of Japan.

== List of core cities ==
As of 1 April 2021, 62 cities have been designated core cities:

| Name | Japanese | Flag | Emblem | Area (km^{2}) | Population (2012) | Date of designation | Region | Prefecture | Map |
|---|---|---|---|---|---|---|---|---|---|
| Akashi | 明石市 | | | 49.22 | 290,927 | 2018-04-01 | Kansai | Hyōgo | |
| Akita | 秋田市 | | | 906.07 | 322,224 | 1997-04-01 | Tōhoku | Akita | |
| Amagasaki | 尼崎市 | | | 49.77 | 451,353 | 2009-04-01 | Kansai | Hyōgo | |
| Aomori | 青森市 | | | 824.61 | 297,348 | 2006-10-01 | Tōhoku | Aomori | |
| Asahikawa | 旭川市 | | | 747.6 | 351,765 | 2000-04-01 | Hokkaidō | | |
| Fukui | 福井市 | | | 536.41 | 266,612 | 2019-04-01 | Chūbu | Fukui | |
| Fukushima | 福島市 | | | 767.72 | 289,355 | 2018-04-01 | Tōhoku | Fukushima | |
| Fukuyama | 福山市 | | | 518.14 | 462,144 | 1998-04-01 | Chūgoku | Hiroshima | |
| Funabashi | 船橋市 | | | 85.62 | 610,492 | 2003-04-01 | Kantō | Chiba | |
| Gifu | 岐阜市 | | | 203.60 | 412,718 | 1996-04-01 | Chūbu | Gifu | |
| Hachinohe | 八戸市 | | | 305.56 | 241,613 | 2017-01-01 | Tōhoku | Aomori | |
| Hachiōji | 八王子市 | | | 186.38 | 579,799 | 2015-04-01 | Kantō | Tokyo | |
| Hakodate | 函館市 | | | 677.89 | 279,056 | 2005-10-01 | Hokkaidō | | |
| Higashiōsaka | 東大阪市 | | | 61.78 | 508,267 | 2005-04-01 | Kansai | Osaka | |
| Himeji | 姫路市 | | | 534.43 | 536,218 | 1996-04-01 | Kansai | Hyōgo | |
| Hirakata | 枚方市 | | | 65.08 | 407,997 | 2014-04-01 | Kansai | Osaka | |
| Ichinomiya | 一宮市 | | | 113.82 | 379,654 | 2021-04-01 | Chūbu | Aichi | |
| Iwaki | いわき市 | | | 1,232.02 | 332,994 | 1999-04-01 | Tōhoku | Fukushima | |
| Kagoshima | 鹿児島市 | | | 547.58 | 607,257 | 1996-04-01 | Kyushu | Kagoshima | |
| Kanazawa | 金沢市 | | | 468.64 | 462,796 | 1996-04-01 | Chūbu | Ishikawa | |
| Kashiwa | 柏市 | | | 114.74 | 404,863 | 2008-04-01 | Kantō | Chiba | |
| Kawagoe | 川越市 | | | 109.13 | 345,361 | 2003-04-01 | Kantō | Saitama | |
| Kawaguchi | 川口市 | | | 61.95 | 561,788 | 2018-04-01 | Kantō | Saitama | |
| Kōchi | 高知市 | | | 309.22 | 342,568 | 1998-04-01 | Shikoku | Kōchi | |
| Kōfu | 甲府市 | | | 212.47 | 197,318 | 2019-04-01 | Chūbu | Yamanashi | |
| Kōriyama | 郡山市 | | | 757.20 | 331,140 | 1997-04-01 | Tōhoku | Fukushima | |
| Koshigaya | 越谷市 | | | 60.24 | 328,079 | 2015-04-01 | Kantō | Saitama | |
| Kurashiki | 倉敷市 | | | 355.63 | 477,086 | 2002-04-01 | Chūgoku | Okayama | |
| Kure | 呉市 | | | 352.80 | 236,595 | 2016-04-01 | Chūgoku | Hiroshima | |
| Kurume | 久留米市 | | | 229.96 | 301,821 | 2008-04-01 | Kyushu | Fukuoka | |
| Maebashi | 前橋市 | | | 311.59 | 338,481 | 2009-04-01 | Kantō | Gunma | |
| Matsue | 松江市 | | | 572.99 | 208,160 | 2018-04-01 | Chūgoku | Shimane | |
| Matsumoto | 松本市 | | | 978.47 | 239,466 | 2021-04-01 | Chūbu | Nagano | |
| Matsuyama | 松山市 | | | 429.40 | 516,823 | 2000-04-01 | Shikoku | Ehime | |
| Mito | 水戸市 | | | 217.32 | 269,162 | 2020-04-01 | Kantō | Ibaraki | |
| Miyazaki | 宮崎市 | | | 643.67 | 402,289 | 1998-04-01 | Kyushu | Miyazaki | |
| Morioka | 盛岡市 | | | 886.47 | 299,734 | 2008-04-01 | Tōhoku | Iwate | |
| Naha | 那覇市 | | | 39.98 | 321,695 | 2013-04-01 | Kyushu | Okinawa | |
| Nagano | 長野市 | | | 834.81 | 380,581 | 1999-04-01 | Chūbu | Nagano | |
| Nagasaki | 長崎市 | | | 240.71 | 440,911 | 1997-04-01 | Kyushu | Nagasaki | |
| Nara | 奈良市 | | | 276.84 | 365,421 | 2002-04-01 | Kansai | Nara | |
| Neyagawa | 寝屋川市 | | | 24.73 | 238,819 | 2019-04-01 | Kansai | Osaka | |
| Nishinomiya | 西宮市 | | | 99.96 | 483,878 | 2008-04-01 | Kansai | Hyōgo | |
| Ōita | 大分市 | | | 502.38 | 476,008 | 1997-04-01 | Kyushu | Ōita | |
| Okazaki | 岡崎市 | | | 387.20 | 374,085 | 2003-04-01 | Chūbu | Aichi | |
| Ōtsu | 大津市 | | | 464.51 | 339,469 | 2009-04-01 | Kansai | Shiga | |
| Sasebo | 佐世保市 | | | 426.06 | 259,676 | 2016-04-01 | Kyushu | Nagasaki | |
| Shimonoseki | 下関市 | | | 716.14 | 277,937 | 2005-10-01 | Chūgoku | Yamaguchi | |
| Suita | 吹田市 | | | 36.11 | 357,917 | 2020-04-01 | Kansai | Osaka | |
| Takamatsu | 高松市 | | | 375.41 | 420,356 | 1999-04-01 | Shikoku | Kagawa | |
| Takasaki | 高崎市 | | | 459.16 | 371,820 | 2011-04-01 | Kantō | Gunma | |
| Takatsuki | 高槻市 | | | 105.31 | 355,840 | 2003-04-01 | Kansai | Osaka | |
| Tottori | 鳥取市 | | | 765.31 | 196,538 | 2018-04-01 | Chūgoku | Tottori | |
| Toyama | 富山市 | | | 1,241.77 | 421,393 | 2005-04-01 | Chūbu | Toyama | |
| Toyohashi | 豊橋市 | | | 261.86 | 375,804 | 1999-04-01 | Chūbu | Aichi | |
| Toyonaka | 豊中市 | | | 36.38 | 390,457 | 2012-04-01 | Kansai | Osaka | |
| Toyota | 豊田市 | | | 918.32 | 420,680 | 1998-04-01 | Chūbu | Aichi | |
| Utsunomiya | 宇都宮市 | | | 416.85 | 513,722 | 1996-04-01 | Kantō | Tochigi | |
| Wakayama | 和歌山市 | | | 210.25 | 368,684 | 1997-04-01 | Kansai | Wakayama | |
| Yamagata | 山形市 | | | 381.58 | 254,519 | 2019-04-01 | Tōhoku | Yamagata | |
| Yao | 八尾市 | | | 41.71 | 270,735 | 2018-04-01 | Kansai | Osaka | |
| Yokosuka | 横須賀市 | | | 100.7 | 415,259 | 2001-04-01 | Kantō | Kanagawa | |

== Former core cities ==
| Name | Japanese | Flag | Emblem | Area (km^{2}) | Population | Date of designation | Date of reclassification | Region | Prefecture | Map |
|---|---|---|---|---|---|---|---|---|---|---|
| Hamamatsu | 浜松市 | | | 1,558.06 | 795,350 | 1996-04-01 | 2007-04-01 (Designated city) | Chūbu | Shizuoka | |
| Kumamoto | 熊本市 | | | 390.32 | 737,812 | 1996-04-01 | 2012-04-01 (Designated city) | Kyushu | Kumamoto | |
| Niigata | 新潟市 | | | 726.45 | 807,450 | 1996-04-01 | 2007-04-01 (Designated city) | Chūbu | Niigata | |
| Okayama | 岡山市 | | | 789.95 | 720,841 | 1996-04-01 | 2009-04-01 (Designated city) | Chūgoku | Okayama | |
| Sagamihara | 相模原市 | | | 328.91 | 720,986 | 2003-04-01 | 2010-04-01 (Designated city) | Kantō | Kanagawa | |
| Sakai | 堺市 | | | 149.82 | 833,544 | 1996-04-01 | 2006-04-01 (Designated city) | Kansai | Osaka | |
| Shizuoka | 静岡市 | | | 1,411.90 | 697,578 | 1996-04-01 | 2005-04-01 (Designated city) | Chūbu | Shizuoka | |

== Scheduled to become a core city ==
| Name | Japanese | Flag | Emblem | Area (km^{2}) | Population (2012) | Scheduled date | Region | Prefecture | Map |
|---|---|---|---|---|---|---|---|---|---|
| Chigasaki | 茅ヶ崎市 | | | 35.71 | 236,222 | 2020-04-01 | Kantō | Kanagawa | |
| Fuji | 富士市 | | | 244.95 | 253,455 | TBD | Chūbu | Shizuoka | |
| Kishiwada | 岸和田市 | | | 72.68 | 198,615 | 2020-04-01 | Kansai | Osaka | |
| Odawara | 小田原市 | | | 113.79 | 197,413 | 2020-04-01 | Kantō | Kanagawa | |
| Tsukuba | つくば市 | | | 283.72 | 216,221 | TBD | Kantō | Ibaraki | |
| Tokorozawa | 所沢市 | | | 72.11 | 342,321 | TBD | Kantō | Saitama | |
| Yokkaichi | 四日市市 | | | 206.44 | 307,599 | 2020 (aiming) | Kansai | Mie | |

== Cities that meet the requirements but have not yet been nominated ==
The following cities have populations greater than 200,000 but have not yet been nominated. (Special cities and cities planning to apply for core city status are not shown.)

| Name | Japanese | Flag | Emblem | Area (km^{2}) | Population | Region | Prefecture | Map |
|---|---|---|---|---|---|---|---|---|
| Ageo | 上尾市 | | | 45.51 | 229,517 | Kantō | Saitama | |
| Chōfu | 調布市 | | | 21.58 | 240,668 | Kantō | Tokyo | |
| Fuchū | 府中市 | | | 29.43 | 260,891 | Kantō | Tokyo | |
| Fujisawa | 藤沢市 | | | 69.57 | 420,254 | Kantō | Kanagawa | |
| Ichihara | 市原市 | | | 368.17 | 274,117 | Kantō | Chiba | |
| Ichikawa | 市川市 | | | 56.39 | 491,804 | Kantō | Chiba | |
| Machida | 町田市 | | | 71.80 | 429,040 | Kantō | Tokyo | |
| Matsudo | 松戸市 | | | 61.38 | 498,575 | Kantō | Chiba | |
| Nagareyama | 流山市 | | | 35.28 | 211,620 | Kantō | Chiba | |
| Nishitokyo | 西東京市 | | | 15.75 | 206,047 | Kantō | Tokyo | |
| Tokushima | 徳島市 | | | 191 | 258,554 | Shikoku | Tokushima | |
| Tsu | 津市 | | | 711.11 | 279,304 | Kansai | Mie | |

== See also ==
- Administrative division
- Urban area
