= List of former towns or villages gained city status alone in Japan =

The following municipalities in Japan gained city status alone, that is, not through a municipal merger. Under Japanese law, the population threshold for city status is set at 50,000, but is lowered to 30,000 if the city is formed through a municipal merger. Cities in this list therefore must have cleared the first, higher threshold.

== 1991 ==
- Sodegaura, Chiba
- Tsurugashima, Saitama
- Hidaka, Saitama
- Hannan, Osaka
- Kashiba, Nara
- Hamura, Tokyo

== 1992 ==
- Yachimata, Chiba
- Maebaru, Fukuoka

== 1994 ==
- Nisshin, Aichi

== 1996 ==
- Yoshikawa, Saitama
- Inzai, Chiba
- Kitahiroshima, Hokkaidō
- Ishikari, Hokkaidō

== 1997 ==
- Kyōtanabe, Kyoto
- Koga, Fukuoka

== 2001 ==
- Shiroi, Chiba
- Rittō, Shiga

== 2002 ==
- Moriya, Ibaraki
- Tomisato, Chiba
- Tomigusuku, Okinawa

== 2006 ==
- Iwade, Wakayama

== 2010 ==
- Miyoshi, Aichi

== 2011 ==
- Nonoichi, Ishikawa

== 2012 ==
- Nagakute, Aichi
- Shiraoka, Saitama

== 2013 ==
- Ōamishirasato, Chiba

== 2014 ==
- Takizawa, Iwate

== 2016 ==
- Tomiya, Miyagi

== 2018 ==
- Nakagawa, Fukuoka
