= List of Japanese cities by population (1889) =

This is the list of Japanese municipalities by population, as of December 31, 1889. The list includes all the cities, as well as other municipalities with more population than Kurume, the least populous city at the time.

Source: Japanese Wikipedia article of 市制 (City system), retrieved on July 4, 2008.

- Japanese national population is as of December 31, 1888.
- Municipal statuses, names, and populations are as of December 31, 1889.
- Prefectural capital statuses are as of 2008.

	Prefecture	Municipality	Pop.	Status	Pref. Capital
	Japan		39,626,600		
1	Tokyo	Tokyo	1,389,684	City	Yes
2	Osaka	Osaka	476,271	City	Yes
3	Kyoto	Kyoto	279,792	City	Yes
4	Aichi	Nagoya	162,767	City	Yes
5	Hyōgo	Kobe	135,639	City	Yes
6	Kanagawa	Yokohama	121,985	City	Yes
7	Ishikawa	Kanazawa	94,257	City	Yes
8	Miyagi	Sendai	90,231	City	Yes
9	Hiroshima	Hiroshima	88,820	City	Yes
10	Tokushima	Tokushima	61,107	City	Yes
11	Toyama	Toyama	58,159	City	Yes
12	Kagoshima	Kagoshima	57,465	City	Yes
13	Wakayama	Wakayama	56,713	City	Yes
14	Nagasaki	Nagasaki	55,063	City	Yes
15	Fukuoka	Fukuoka	53,014	City	Yes
16	Hokkaido	Hakodate	52,909	Ward	No
17	Kumamoto	Kumamoto	52,833	City	Yes
18	Okayama	Okayama	48,333	City	Yes
19	Osaka	Sakai	48,165	City	No
20	Niigata	Niigata	46,353	City	Yes
21	Fukui	Fukui	40,849	City	Yes
	Okinawa	Naha	40,212	Unofficial area	Yes
22	Shizuoka	Shizuoka	37,664	City	Yes
23	Shimane	Matsue	35,934	City	Yes
24	Ehime	Matsuyama	32,738	City	Yes
25	Kōchi	Kōchi	32,241	City	Yes
	Kagawa	Takamatsu	32,081	Unofficial area	Yes
26	Iwate	Morioka	31,153	City	Yes
27	Yamanashi	Kōfu	31,135	City	Yes
28	Tochigi	Utsunomiya	30,698	Town	Yes
29	Aomori	Hirosaki	30,487	City	No
30	Shiga	Ōtsu	29,941	Town	Yes
31	Yamaguchi	Akamaseki	29,919	City	No
32	Yamagata	Yonezawa	29,591	City	No
33	Akita	Akita	29,568	City	Yes
34	Nagano	Matsumoto	29,319	Town	No
35	Yamagata	Yamagata	29,019	City	Yes
36	Nagano	Nagano	28,980	Town	Yes
37	Toyama	Takaoka	28,928	City	No
38	Tottori	Tottori	28,396	City	Yes
39	Mie	Tsu	28,156	City	Yes
40	Gunma	Maebashi	28,115	Town	Yes
41	Mie	Ujiyamada	27,365	Town	No
42	Gifu	Gifu	27,089	City	Yes
43	Hyōgo	Himeji	27,055	City	No
44	Saga	Saga	26,401	City	Yes
	Okinawa	Shuri	26,205	Unofficial area	Yes
45	Osaka	Nanba	25,617	Village	Yes
46	Ibaraki	Mito	25,591	City	Yes
47	Fukuoka	Kurume	24,859	City	No

- These municipalities changed their names:
  - Akamaseki, now a part of Shimonoseki.
  - Ujiyamada, now a part of Ise.
  - Shuri, now a part of Naha.
  - Nanba, now a part of Chūō Ward, Osaka.
- Naha, Takamatsu, and Shuri were unofficial place names given to the groups of smaller towns or villages.
