= Cities of Japan =

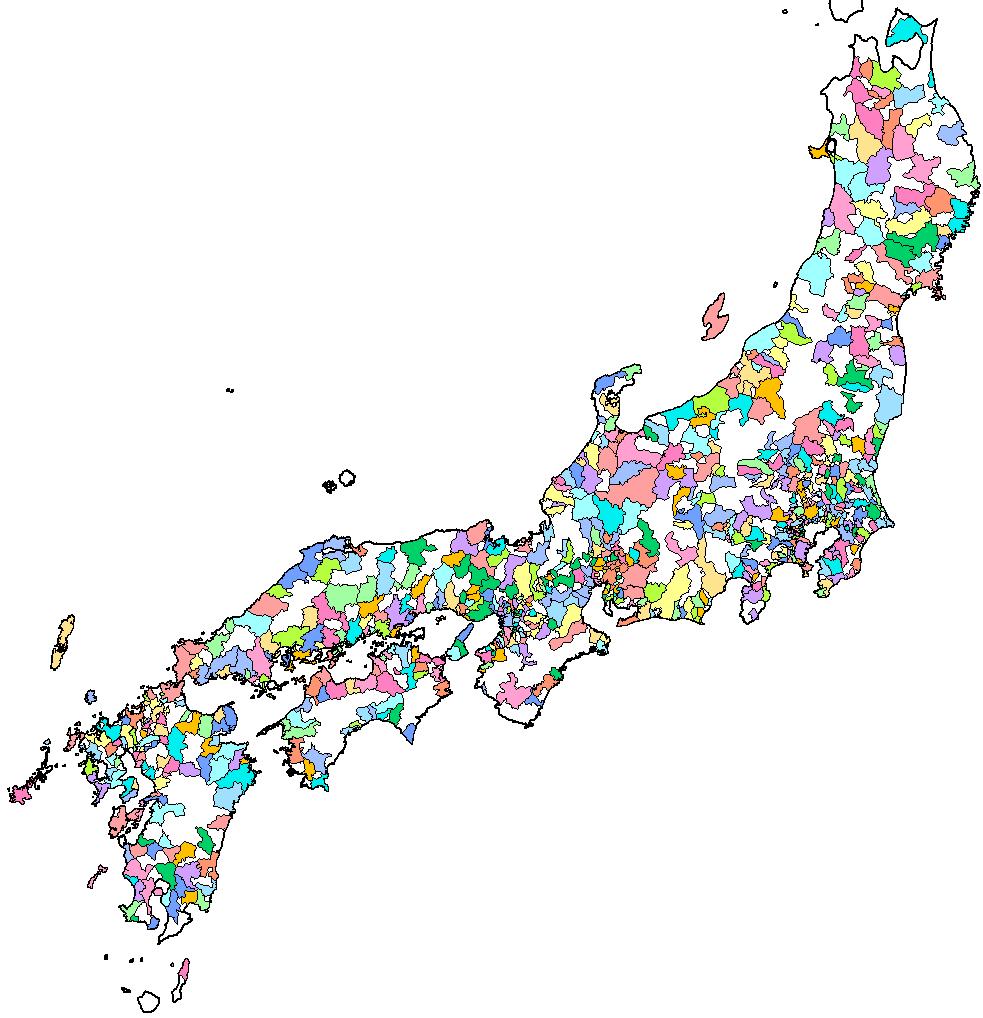
Cities of Japan (without Hokkaido and Okinawa)

A city (市, shi) is a local administrative unit in Japan. Cities are ranked on the same level as towns (町, machi) and villages (村, mura), with the difference that they are not a component of districts (郡, gun). Like other contemporary administrative units, they are defined by the Local Autonomy Law of 1947.

== City status ==
Article 8 of the Local Autonomy Law sets the following conditions for a municipality to be designated as a city:

- Population must generally be 50,000 or greater
- At least 60% of households must be established in a central urban area
- At least 60% of households must be employed in commerce, industry, or other urban occupations
- Any other conditions set by prefectural ordinance must be satisfied

The designation is approved by the prefectural governor and the Minister for Internal Affairs and Communications.

A city can theoretically be demoted to a town or village when it fails to meet any of these conditions, but such a demotion has not happened to date. The least populous city, Utashinai, Hokkaido, has a population of 3,000, while a town in the same prefecture, Otofuke, Hokkaido, has over 40,000.

Under the Act on Special Provisions concerning Merger of Municipalities (市町村の合併の特例等に関する法律; Act No. 59 of 2004), the standard of 50,000 inhabitants for the city status has been eased to 30,000 if such population is gained as a result of a merger of towns and/or villages, in order to facilitate such mergers to reduce administrative costs. Many municipalities gained city status under this eased standard. On the other hand, the municipalities recently gained the city status purely as a result of increase of population without expansion of area are limited to those listed in List of former towns or villages gained city status alone in Japan.

=== Classifications for large cities ===
The Cabinet of Japan can designate cities of at least 200,000 inhabitants to have the status of core city, or designated city. These statuses expand the scope of administrative authority delegated from the prefectural government to the city government.

=== Status of Tokyo ===
Tokyo, Japan's capital, existed as a city until 1943, but is now legally classified as a special type of prefecture called a metropolis (都, to). The 23 special wards of Tokyo, which constitute the core of the Tokyo metropolitan area, each have an administrative status analogous to that of cities. Tokyo also has several other incorporated cities, towns and villages within its jurisdiction.

== History ==
Cities were introduced under the "city code" (shisei, 市制) of 1888 during the "Great Meiji mergers" (Meiji no daigappei, 明治の大合併) of 1889. The -shi replaced the previous urban districts/"wards/cities" (-ku) that had existed as primary subdivisions of prefectures besides rural districts (-gun) since 1878. Initially, there were 39 cities in 1889: only one in most prefectures, two in a few (Yamagata, Toyama, Osaka, Hyōgo, Fukuoka), and none in some – Miyazaki became the last prefecture to contain its first city in 1924. In Okinawa-ken and Hokkai-dō which were not yet fully equal prefectures in the Empire, major urban settlements remained organized as urban districts until the 1920s: Naha-ku and Shuri-ku, the two urban districts of Okinawa were only turned into Naha-shi and Shuri-shi in May 1921, and six -ku of Hokkaido were converted into district-independent cities in August 1922.

By 1945, the number of cities countrywide had increased to 205. After WWII, their number almost doubled during the "great Shōwa mergers" of the 1950s and continued to grow so that it surpassed the number of towns in the early 21st century (see the List of mergers and dissolutions of municipalities in Japan). As of October 1 2018, there are 792 cities of Japan.

== See also ==
- Administrative division
- Urban area
- List of cities in Japan
