= Designated city =

Type of Japanese city

A designated city (指定都市, shitei toshi; [ɕi̥.tei toꜜ.ɕi, -teː-]) or government ordinance city (政令市, seireishi; [sei.ɾeꜜi.ɕi, seː.ɾeꜜː-]), short for city designated by government ordinance (政令指定都市, seirei shitei toshi; [sei.ɾei ɕi̥.tei toꜜ.ɕi, seː.ɾeː- -teː-]), is a Japanese city that has a population greater than 500,000 and has been designated as such by order of the Cabinet of Japan under Article 252, Section 19, of the Local Autonomy Law.

Designated cities are delegated many of the functions normally performed by prefectural governments in fields such as public education, social welfare, sanitation, business licensing, and urban planning. The city government is generally delegated the various minor administrative functions in each area, and the prefectural government retains authority over major decisions. For instance, pharmaceutical retailers and small clinics can be licensed by designated city governments, but pharmacies and hospitals are licensed by prefectural governments.

Designated cities are also required to subdivide themselves into wards (区, ku) (broadly equivalent to the boroughs of London or the boroughs of New York City), each of which has a ward office conducting various administrative functions for the city government, such as koseki and juminhyo resident registration and tax collection. In some cities, ward offices are responsible for business licensing, construction permits, and other administrative matters. The structure and the authorities of the wards are determined by municipal ordinances.

The 23 special wards of Tokyo are not part of this system, as Tokyo is a prefecture, and its wards are effectively independent cities. Although the two largest wards of Tokyo, Setagaya and Nerima, are populous enough to become designated cities, they are not considered to be "cities" within the meaning of the Local Autonomy Law and so are not designated as such.

No city designated by government ordinance has ever lost that status.

== List of designated cities ==
Designated cites in Japan (except for Kanto region and Kansai area)
7: Okayama, 8: Hiroshima, 9: Kitakyushu
Designated cites in Kanto region area
Designated cites in Kansai area and Western Tōkai area

Cities designated by government ordinance have been established since 1956.

| Name | Japanese | Skyline | Flag | Emblem | Area (km^{2}) | Population | Population density | Date of designation | Region | Prefecture | No. of wards | Lists of wards | Map |
|---|---|---|---|---|---|---|---|---|---|---|---|---|---|
| Chiba | 千葉市 | | | | 271.77 | 972,861 | 3,613 | 1992-04-01 | Kantō | Chiba | 6 | List | |
| Fukuoka | 福岡市 | | | | 343.39 | 1,579,450 | 4,668 | 1972-04-01 | Kyushu | Fukuoka | 7 | List | |
| Hamamatsu | 浜松市 | | | | 1,558.06 | 795,350 | 506 | 2007-04-01 | Chūbu | Shizuoka | 7 | List | |
| Hiroshima | 広島市 | | | | 906.68 | 1,194,524 | 1,321 | 1980-04-01 | Chūgoku | Hiroshima | 8 | List | |
| Kawasaki | 川崎市 | | | | 143.01 | 1,503,690 | 10,765 | 1972-04-01 | Kantō | Kanagawa | 7 | List | |
| Kitakyushu | 北九州市 | | | | 491.95 | 945,595 | 1,901 | 1963-04-01 | Kyushu | Fukuoka | 7 | List | |
| Kobe | 神戸市 | | | | 557.02 | 1,526,639 | 2,719 | 1956-09-01 | Kansai | Hyōgo | 9 | List | |
| Kumamoto | 熊本市 | | | | 390.32 | 737,812 | 1,892 | 2012-04-01 | Kyushu | Kumamoto | 5 | List | |
| Kyoto | 京都市 | | | | 827.83 | 1,468,980 | 1,758 | 1956-09-01 | Kansai | Kyoto | 11 | List | |
| Nagoya | 名古屋市 | | | | 326.45 | 2,283,289 | 7,128 | 1956-09-01 | Chūbu | Aichi | 16 | List | |
| Niigata | 新潟市 | | | | 726.45 | 807,450 | 1,089 | 2007-04-01 | Chūbu | Niigata | 8 | List | |
| Okayama | 岡山市 | | | | 789.95 | 720,841 | 912 | 2009-04-01 | Chūgoku | Okayama | 4 | List | |
| Osaka | 大阪市 | | | | 225.21 | 2,727,255 | 12,226 | 1956-09-01 | Kansai | Osaka | 24 | List | |
| Sagamihara | 相模原市 | | | | 328.91 | 720,986 | 2,198 | 2010-04-01 | Kantō | Kanagawa | 3 | List | |
| Saitama | さいたま市 | | | | 217.43 | 1,226,656 | 6,072 | 2003-04-01 | Kantō | Saitama | 10 | List | |
| Sakai | 堺市 | | | | 149.82 | 833,544 | 5,500 | 2006-04-01 | Kansai | Osaka | 7 | List | |
| Sapporo | 札幌市 | | | | 1,121.26 | 1,955,115 | 1,750 | 1972-04-01 | Hokkaido | Hokkaido | 10 | List | |
| Sendai | 仙台市 | | | | 786.30 | 1,088,669 | 1,389 | 1989-04-01 | Tōhoku | Miyagi | 5 | List | |
| Shizuoka | 静岡市 | | | | 1,411.90 | 697,578 | 486 | 2005-04-01 | Chūbu | Shizuoka | 3 | List | |
| Yokohama | 横浜市 | | | | 437.56 | 3,732,616 | 8,588 | 1956-09-01 | Kantō | Kanagawa | 18 | List | |

== Designated city requirements ==
To become a candidate for designated city status, a city must have a population greater than 500,000. An application for designation is made by a city with the approval of both the city and the prefectural assemblies.

The following cities have populations greater than 500,000 but have not yet been nominated.

| Name | Japanese | Flag | Emblem | Area (km^{2}) | Population (2012) | Region | Prefecture | Map |
|---|---|---|---|---|---|---|---|---|
| Funabashi | 船橋市 | | | 85.62 | 610,492 | Kantō | Chiba | |
| Hachiōji | 八王子市 | | | 186.38 | 579,799 | Kantō | Tokyo | |
| Himeji | 姫路市 | | | 534.43 | 536,218 | Kansai | Hyōgo | |
| Kagoshima | 鹿児島市 | | | 547.58 | 607,257 | Kyushu | Kagoshima | |
| Kawaguchi | 川口市 | | | 61.95 | 561,788 | Kantō | Saitama | |
| Matsuyama | 松山市 | | | 429.40 | 516,823 | Shikoku | Ehime | |
| Utsunomiya | 宇都宮市 | | | 416.85 | 513,722 | Kantō | Tochigi | |

== History ==
The first form of the designated city system was enacted under Japan local government system in 1878 with the introduction of "wards." Under that system, wards existed in every city. Most cities had only one ward, but the largest cities at the time (Tokyo, Osaka and Kyoto) were divided into 15, four, and two wards, respectively.

The municipal system enacted in 1889 replaced ward assemblies with city assemblies but retained ward assemblies in Tokyo, Osaka and Kyoto, which had no assembly of their own but were governed by the prefectural assembly. In 1898, the three cities were allowed to form city assemblies. The ward system was adopted by three more cities prior to World War II: Nagoya (1908), Yokohama (1927), and Kobe (1931). Under a 1911 statute, wards were granted a corporate personality and so treated as local entities.

Following the war, the 1947 Local Autonomy Law grandfathered in the five subdivided cities (Tokyo having become a prefecture in 1943) as special cities (特別市, tokubetsu shi). The system was replaced by the designated city system when the Local Autonomy Law was amended, in 1956.

During the ensuing Japanese economic growth period, the government required designated cities to be forecast to reach a population of one million within the near future, but the requirement was dropped in 2005 to 700,000 to accommodate several geographically large cities that were formed by mergers, under the government of Junichiro Koizumi.

== See also ==
- Administrative divisions of Japan
- Urban area
- Sub-provincial division (Mainland China)
