= Japanese land law =

Law of real property in Japan

Japanese land law is the law of real property in Japan, with land laws existing there since the Land Tax Reform Law of 1873 and the Old City Planning Law of 1919. The New City Planning Law of 1968 – also called "New Law" – replaced the "Old Law" in 1968, even though the basic framework of the former was mostly retained. The New Law became the foundation for city plans, land-use regulations, construction regulations, and activities related to city facilities. Working in concert with other laws regulating land use in Japan, it set standards for city master planning projects and activities, and promoted the balanced development of national lands that contributed to public welfare.

The New Law was replaced by the Land-Use Law in 1974 in order to deal with the increasing concentration of population and industry in major cities, speculative land investment, abnormally high land prices, and chaotic development. This law required all three levels of government – national, prefecture, and municipal – to create plans for the use of national lands in a process starting with the National Land-Use Plan prepared by the Ministry of Land, Infrastructure, Transport and Tourism and approved by the Cabinet. The prefecture plans – known as Basic Land-Use Plans (BLPs) – were then based on the national plans, with the municipal plans based on the prefecture plans in turn.

The Land-Use Law introduced the concept of zoning to all of Japan, modelled on a German land planning system that was flexible and allowed citizens to participate. This was later integrated into the parts of cities known as City Planning Areas, and as a result there are now approximately thirty types of sub-zones from which local governments can choose when planning and zoning, including thirteen Land Use Zones with four Overlay Zones, as well as fifteen Specialized Zones and four Promotion Area Zones. After 2011, a decentralisation policy delegated the power to create a Land-Use plan to prefectures without needing approval from the central government.

Japan becoming an economic superpower in the second half of the 20th century introduced a number of land-specific problems, including large increases in land prices, government difficulties in acquiring land for public facilities and infrastructure, and chaotic urban development. The government's response was the Basic Law for Land (BLL) of 1989 – also known as the Fundamental Land Law – designed to address profiteering from land speculation, with the central government and local governments authorized to place "appropriate burdens" on parties profiting from "social capital" services.

== Early land laws ==
The Land Tax Reform of 1873 (chisokaisei) was the first modern land law in Japan. It contributed to the economic growth of the Meiji period, increasing tax revenue and boosting farm productivity by issuing the title deeds to buy and sell land freely, thereby replacing the old economic and social system with a new one. A total of 109.33 million landownership certificates were issued in 1876.

In 1888 the Tokyo City Improvement Ordinance (shiku kaisei) was enacted, although it had been in preparation since 1876. It targeted infrastructure development such as major streets and waterworks so as to prevent epidemics in Tokyo. The projects it covered were completed 30 years later, in 1918. Later, when the Great Kantō earthquake almost completely destroyed the Tokyo area in 1923, the Reconstruction Agency was created to rebuild Tokyo and Yokohama within 7 years.

Because of the development needed to cope with rapid industrialization and urbanization, by 1917 there was demand from the architectural profession and large cities outside of Tokyo to institutionalize a planning system for the whole nation. In response, the government created the City Planning Section (toshi keikaku) of the Home Ministry, led by the First Section chief Ikeda Hiroshi. He drafted the Old City Planning Law – enacted in 1919 and later called "Old Law" or "Old City Planning Law" – as well as the Urban Building Law (shigaichi kenchikubutsu). The Old City Planning Law provided zoning, building-line control, and land consolidation, and by the end of 1930 it applied to more than 100 cities.

After World War II the Home Ministry was denounced for militarism, and in 1948 it was replaced by the Ministry of Construction. The Urban Building Law was also replaced by the Building Standard Law (kenchiku kijun ho).

== New City Planning Law (1968) ==
The economic miracle in Japan from the 1950s to the 1980s saw the major metropolitan areas developed with high-rise office buildings, heavy industrial plants, highway systems, Shinkansen lines, new towns, golf courses, and urban sprawl. Land prices soared but the environment deteriorated, with urban expansion bringing traffic congestion and the failure of the trunk road system. In response, the Diet replaced the Old Law with the New City Planning Law of 1968, called "New Law", even though the basic framework of the former law was mostly retained. The New Law combined former and new redevelopment programmes, and became the foundation for city plans, land-use regulations, construction regulations, and activities related to city facilities. Working jointly with other laws regulating land use in Japan, it set standards for city master planning projects and activities, and promoted the balanced development of national lands that contributed to public welfare.

The New Law had three fundamental principles: firstly, enabling a sound harmonization of urbanization with the agricultural, forestry, and fisheries industries; secondly, the fostering of a secure, healthy, and cultural urban condition, and functional urban life; and thirdly, ensuring a reasonable planning of land. It introduced the City Planning Area (CPA) concept, a designation of areas designed to discourage both over-development and overly restrictive permitting of developments. This partially delegated planning powers to prefectural and municipal governments, as well as introducing procedures for citizen participation.

The Local Autonomy Act was also revised in 1969 to require local governments to produce a forward-looking Basic Plan (kihon keikaku) for their long-term economic and social development over the following 25 years. Each plan had to be approved by the elected local council as part of a comprehensive planning process tied to local fiscal decisions. The Building Standard Law was also revised twice to remove limits on building heights and to allow more detailed zoning control.

== Land Use Law (1974) ==
The Land-Use Law was enacted in 1974 to deal with the concentration of population and industry in major cities, speculative land investment, abnormally high land prices, and chaotic development. It has four fundamental principles: firstly, that public welfare is above all other considerations; secondly, that there must be planning for natural resource preservation; thirdly, that healthy and cultural living environments must be protected; and fourthly, that there must be planning for balanced development of land use.

The law requires all three levels of government – national, prefecture, and municipal – to create plans for the use of national lands. The process starts with the National Land-Use Plan – also known as the National Plan – prepared by the Ministry of Land, Infrastructure, Transport and Tourism and approved by the Cabinet. The prefecture plans are then based on the national plans, with the municipal plans based on the prefecture plans in turn.

At the prefecture level, prefecture governments must create a Basic Land-Use Plan (BLP), based on their prefecture plan. A BLP specifies five zones, similar to the sub-zones of the City Planning Law but at a larger scale. Different laws apply to these five zones and they can overlap, with more than one zone designated in a single area.

color	zone	law	percentage (2014)
	City Areas	The City Planning Area in the City Planning Law	27.4%
	Agricultural Areas	The Agricultural Promotion Area in the Agricultural Promotion Law	46.2%
	Forest areas	Private forests subject to regional forest planning and the National Forest in the Forest Law	68.0%
	Natural Park Areas	The National Parks / Quasi-National Parks (Article 5) in the Natural Parks Law; The Prefectural Natural Park (Article 72) by prefectural ordinance	14.7%
	Natural Preservation Areas	The Primitive Natural Environment Conservation Area (Article 14) and the Natural Environment Conservation Area (Article 22) in the Natural Environment Conservation Law; the Prefectural Natural Environment Conservation Area (Article 22) by prefectural ordinance	0.3%

In 1987 the Land Transaction Surveillance system was added into the Land Use Law to monitor land transactions or transfers within a prefecture, and giving the governor the power to prohibit highly speculative transactions. However, local governments do not have the legal power to stop any transactions, although a public announcement can deter further speculation.

After decentralisation started in Japan a BLP no longer needed to be approved by the Prime Minister, with a prefecture only needing to 'consult with' the Ministry of Land, Infrastructure, Transport and Tourism instead. In 2009 the Decentralization Reform Promotion Committee recommending changing the condition from 'consult with' to 'hearing opinion' instead. Finally, from 2011, it was no longer mandatory to consult with the central government, although consultation was sometimes still required because of the technical complexity of planning.

== Basic Law for Land (1989) ==
Japan becoming an economic superpower in the second half of the 20th century introduced a number of land-specific problems, including "large increases in land prices, government difficulties in acquiring land for public facilities and infrastructure, and chaotic urban development." In 1988 the Ordinary Administrative Reform Propulsion Discussion Committee submitted its report on "Measures for Land Prices and Other Issues" to the Prime Minister, commenting that there were unfair advantages from land speculation. The government's response was the Basic Law for Land (BLL), also known as the Fundamental Land Law, although profiteering from land speculation reportedly influenced the Diet members who drafted the BLL.

The main purpose of the BLL was to establish four fundamental principles of land-use: firstly, public interests in land are superior to private interests; secondly, land-use shall be in accordance with uses appropriate to an area's natural, social, economic, and cultural conditions; thirdly, speculative investments in land shall be restrained; and fourthly, "appropriate burdens" shall be placed on parties profiteering from increases in land prices. The BLL does not affect individual rights in itself but is the foundation for more specific land laws such as the Aggregate Control of Real Estate-Related Loans Law. Land taxation and land price control are allowed by the BLL, with the central government and local governments authorized by Article 14 to penalise parties profiting from "social capital" services.

== City Planning Law ==
The introduction of the City Planning Area (CPA) as the primary and largest zone classification of the City Planning Law affected the potential development of approximately 25% of the land in Japan. Proponents of a CPA are required, firstly, to designate the area division; secondly, to be available for the development permits; and thirdly, to apply the group rule stipulated for the relationship between buildings and cities in the Building Standard Law. Prefecture governors are in charge of designating a proposed area as a CPA after consultation with municipal mayors and deliberation councils, but a CPA usually has to also be approved by the Ministry of Land, Infrastructure, Transport and Tourism (MLIT). However, if the CPA combines two or more prefectures the MLIT can itself designate the CPA. Since development is highly restricted outside the CPAs, most development in Japan occurs within a CPA, whose aim is to make public investments more efficient and support land use for valid reasons.

Regulators use five specific and mutually exclusive definitions to apply a CPA in defining a large urban area as a city: firstly, a city must have more than 10,000 residents in the municipality and 50% of the workers in it must be involved in commerce and industry; secondly, a city must be expected to number more than 10,000 people in 10 years; thirdly, a city's center must house over 3,000 people; fourthly, a city must have a tourism industry and a need for development; and fifthly, a city that has undergone a disaster needs recovery assistance.

Large cities within those five categories are mandated to divide themselves into two areas – the Urbanization Promoting Area (UPA), and the Urbanisation Control Area (UCA) – a system that makes public investments more effective and limits urban sprawl. A UPA is defined as an area which already forms an urban area and shall be urbanized specifically and systematically within about 10 years, with priority for implementation given to public facilities such as streets and sewage systems. A UCA is defined as an area which shall control its urbanization, with building plan development not allowed in principle. Small cities are not mandated to divide their areas and are instead called Unzoned Areas (UA), sometimes referred to as misenbiki areas. The development of the UPA, UCA, and UA system is meant to prevent erratic developments in the urban fringe. Zoning and development are legal anywhere between the three areas, but the majority occurs in the UPA where the process is easiest. Zoning law changes fall into four categories: applying to 100% of one administrative area; applying to 100% of many administrative areas; applying to part (below 100%) of one administrative area; and applying to part (below 100%) of many administrative areas.

The law was amended in 1980 to enable a more bottom-up and micro-plan approach to city planning, using the German planning system B Plans. Anchored in both municipalities and citizens, the system is flexible and allows citizens to participate. As a result, there are now approximately thirty types of sub zones within a CPA, and local governments can choose any of them when planning and zoning.

== Land Use Zones ==
The thirteen Land Use Zones detailed in the table below are used to regulate land use and building form, with the overall framework consisting of 8 types of residential districts, 2 types of commercial districts, and 3 types of industrial districts that can be specified for a particular UPA. For example, hotels cannot be built in low density residential districts. Each district's regulation is determined by building coverage, floor area ratio, height limitations, limitations on road widths, diagonal line limitations for the road and adjacent land, and shadow area limitations, and all of these criteria relate to the Building Standard Act.

color	zone	detail
	Category I low-rise residential (第一種低層住居専用地域)	Low-rise residential buildings which are also used as small shops or offices; elementary/junior high schools
	Category II low-rise residential (第二種低層住居専用地域)	Low-rise residential buildings, including small shops or offices; elementary/junior high schools with a floor area of up to 150 sq.m.
	Category I mid/high-rise residential (第一種中高層住居専用地域)	Medium to high residential buildings, including hospitals and universities; some types of shops with a floor area of up to 500 sq.m.
	Category II mid/high-rise residential (第二種中高層住居専用地域)	Medium to high residential buildings, including hospitals and universities; some types of shop with a floor area of up to 1,500 sq.m.
	Category I residential (第一種住居地域)	Residential environments including shops, offices, and hotels with a floor area of up to 3,000 sq.m.
	Category II residential (第二種住居地域)	Residential environments including shops, offices, and hotels, as well as buildings with a karaoke box
	Quasi-residential (準住居地域)	Residential environments in harmony with vehicle-related facilities along roads
	Rural residential (田園住居地域)	Low-rise housing up to 500 sq.m. related to agricultural promotion
	Neighborhood commercial (近隣商業地域)	Daily shopping facilities for neighbourhood residents, including small factory buildings.
	Commercial (商業地域)	Banks, cinemas, restaurants, and department stores, including residential and small factory buildings
	Quasi-industrial (準工業地域)	Light industrial and service facilities; all types of factories except those which are considered to considerably worsen the environment
	Industrial (工業地域)	All types of factories including residential and shops; schools, hospitals, and hotels not permitted
	Exclusively industrial (工業専用地域)	All types of factories; residential, shop, school, hospital, and hotel not permitted

=== Overlay Zones ===
Four Overlay Zones are permitted on top of the thirteen Land Use Zones, and are designated by municipal mayors.

zone	detail
Special Use Districts	Promoting specialized purposes such as environmental protection, industrial development, education, recreation
High-Rise Residential Guidance Districts	Specialized maximum limits on building-coverage ratios, floor area ratios (FARs), and site areas for buildings; permitted only in Category I & II residential zones, Quasi-residential zones, Neighborhood commercial zones, and Quasi-industrial zones
Height Districts	Particularized minimum and maximum building heights for preserving the environment
Height Use Districts	Particularized minimum and maximum restrictions on building-coverage ratios, FARs, and minimums for building-coverage ratios and setbacks; for planning of "logical and sound" high land-use and urban renewal

=== Specialized Zones ===
Fifteen Specialized Zones are legally permissible anywhere inside a CPA.

zone	detail
Particularized Use Restriction Zones	Protection of the environment and promotion of rational land-use; special bulk and density limitations on buildings (permitted only in the UCA)
Particularized Urban Districts	Special limits on FARs, heights, and positioning of walls when these districts adjoin one another; transfer of FARs between districts permitted.
Fire Protection Zones	Protection against fires
Aesthetic Districts	Protection of aesthetics of municipalities through ordinances (jorei) that may set special limits on building structures.
Scenic Districts	Preservation of natural scenery through regulation of architecture, residential developments, and cutting of trees, using ministerial ordinances (shorei)
Port Districts	All kind of operations of ports and harbors
Historical Climate Special Preservation Districts	Preservation of the historical climate (fudo) of ancient cities
Class I & II Historical Climate Preservation Districts	Restriction of changes to the current state of an area
Green Space Preservation Districts	Planning for appropriate buffering, and for traditional, cultural, and natural environment purposes
Distribution Business Districts	Buildings limited to structure types such as freight stations, warehouses, and wholesale distribution markets and stores
Productive Green Districts	Used for agricultural lands over 500 square meters and located in a UPA
Districts for the Preservation of Traditional Structures	Preservation of traditional structures and surrounding areas
Districts for Prevention of Noise Impediments Caused by Airplanes	Designated on land around airports for prevention of noise
Special Districts for Prevention of Noise Impediments Caused by Airplanes	Noise prevention; in general, schools, hospitals, and residential uses are not permitted
Parking Facilities Districts	Prefectures can enact ordinances requiring parking facilities for construction or alteration to structures over 2,000 square meters

=== Promotion Area Zones ===
Four Promotion Area Zones are legally permissible anywhere inside a CPA.

zone	detail
Urban Redevelopment Promotion Zone	Development of under-utilized urban area
Land Parcel Arrangement Promotion Area Zone	Local governments may re-set boundaries for streets and other public spaces such as parks
Residential Area Management Promotion Zone	Development of under-utilized residential zone
Urban Disaster Recovery Promotion Zone	Emergency planning to revitalize areas hit by major disaster

=== District Plans ===
The six types of District Plans are detailed neighborhood-scale planning that aims to accommodate or promote high-rise residences, urban redevelopment, fire and noise prevention, and the implementation of FARs and transferable development right systems. In addition to these six fundamental categories, local governments can create additional sub-categories.

zone	detail
District Plan	Allows use and performance standards for planning of city areas on a very localized scale
Residential High Utilization District Plan	Employs special use and performance standards to mid- to high-rise buildings in residential zone
Redevelopment District Plan	Redevelopment activities, only in a UPA
Fire Protection Maintenance Districting Plan	Special safety regulations related to fires caused by natural disasters
Road Districting Plan	Mitigation of noise emanating from major roads, only in a UPA
Village Districting Planning	Planning of agricultural and residential needs, only in a UPC

=== City Planning Projects ===
Except for Promotion Area Zones, in general City Planning Projects are allowed only in the UPAs.

project	detail
Urban Area Development Projects	A. New Residential Area Development Project B. Industrial Estate Development Project C. New City Foundation Management Project D. Land Planning Arrangement Project E. Urban Area Redevelopment Project F. Residential Area Management Project
Urban Infrastructure Projects	A. Infrastructure for Residential Subdivision Developments over 20 hectares B. Infrastructure for Government Office Group Areas C. Distribution Business Districts D. Other urban infrastructure
Urban Development Projects Scheduling Areas	Early planning areas, securing large-scale development and infrastructure areas to prevent speculative investment A. New Residential Subdivision Development Project Scheduling Area; B. Industrial Estate Development Project Scheduling Area; C. New City Foundation Projects Scheduling Area; D. Over 20-Hectare Area Residential Facility Scheduling Area; E. Public Infrastructure Scheduling Area; F. Distribution Business Scheduling Area

== Government jurisdiction over zoning ==
According to 2011 data by Shibata, there are clear stages of jurisdiction from the central government to local governments.

Government level	Jurisdiction
Ministry of Land, Infrastructure, Transport and Tourism	City Planning Areas when they overlap two or more prefecture borders
Prefectures	City Planning Areas (except when they overlap more than one prefecture) A limited number of sub zones such as: High-Rise Residential Guidance Districts in City Planning Areas that lie within the borders of designated cities or their surrounding areas; Scenic Districts (over ten hectares); Seaside Districts; Green Preservation Districts (over ten hectares); Historic Climate Special Preservation Districts; Class I and Class II Quasi-Historic Climate Special Preservation Districts; Distribution Business Districts; Districts for Prevention of Noise Impediments Caused by Airplanes; Project and facilities such as: Urban Development Project Scheduling Areas; Urban Area Development Projects; and; Urban Facilities such as national or prefectural highways, parks, green areas, open squares (over ten hectares), ports, universities, trade and specialty high schools, public offices, distribution business areas, and residential subdivisions with more than 2,000 residences
Municipalities	Standard sub-zones such as: The 13 Land Use Zones; Specialized Zones; Height Districts; High Utilization Districts; Particularized/Specialized Street Districts; Fire Protection Zones; and; Quasi-Fire Protection Zones; District Plan Areas, Promotion Areas, and Urban Area Development Projects such as: Land Planning Arrangement Projects under fifty hectares; Urban Revitalization Projects under three hectares; Residential Area Management Projects (all others fall under prefectural jurisdiction); Areas for Promotion of Conversion of Un-utilized Land; Urban Fire Area Revitalization Promotion Zones; and; Urban Facilities
