= Municipal mergers and dissolutions in Japan =

Municipal mergers and dissolutions carried out in Japan (市町村合併, shichōson gappei) have occurred since the Meiji era to join the facilities and legal boundaries of municipal districts, towns, and cities. Often, these mergers are driven by a necessity to consolidate villages and 'natural settlements' into larger-scale cities as modernization progressed and consolidation was promoted to provide greater access to public facilities and schools.

== History ==
There have been several "waves" of merger activity between Japanese municipalities. The first wave, known as "the great Meiji mergers" (明治の大合併, meiji-no-daigappei), occurred in the period from 1888 to 1889, when the modern municipal system was established. Before the mergers, existing municipalities were the direct successors of spontaneous hamlets called hanseison (藩政村), or villages under the han system. This han system is still reflected in the postal system for rural areas as postal units called ōaza (大字). The mergers slashed the number of ‘natural settlements’ (自然集落, shizen shūraku) that existed at the time from 71,314 to 15,859 cities, towns and villages, justified at the time by the increased scale and relevance of the resulting respective autonomous governing bodies.

The second wave, called "the great Shōwa mergers" (昭和の大合併, shōwa-no-daigappei), took place over the period from 1953 to 1956. It reduced the number of cities, towns and villages by over half, from 9,868 to 3,472 with purposes of the establishment of a National Treasury Subsidy System. 5,000 villages disappeared, but the number of cities were doubled.

In 1965, the Special Law for Municipal Mergers (SLMM) was enacted, but it failed to motivate municipalities to voluntarily merge with others.

== Contemporary causes ==
The declining birthrate of Japan and very poor fiscal state led the Japanese central government to promote national consolidation reform from the late 20th century onwards.

As of January 2006, many municipalities in Japan contained fewer than 200 residents. Japanese municipalities require skilled workers, and 40% of Japan's GDP consisted of debts from local governments. Efforts to merge local governments have been made with aims to expand residential area per municipal government, create different school attendance boundaries for elementary school and junior high school students, and to allow more widespread use of public facilities.

== Process ==
After the decentralisation movement started, based on the Omnibus Decentralization Law and an amendment to the Special Law for Municipal Mergers (SLMM) in 1999, which provided strong financial and economic incentives for municipal consolidation, the central government forced municipal mergers by using incentive schemes according to special financial measures:

- A grace period was offered to keep an original grant after municipal mergers, combining the grants of the two combined municipalities. If city A received 0, and city B received 100, a merger of A and B would keep 100, guaranteeing the same amount of grants.
- After mergers, the issue of special local bonds would be paid through central government grants. These special bonds provided very strong incentive for the implementation of public works to support the new merged municipalities.

Although mergers were not mandatory, the central government established a goal of decreasing municipality numbers to 1,000, and used these incentives to urge prefectural governments to promote mergers.

There are two types of municipal merger under this and previous policies:

- Absorption by one city of others. The core city retains its name, legal status, mayor and legislative body, and municipal offices, while the absorbed entity loses theirs.
- The creation of a new entity out of the merger cities. When a new entity is created, they receive new legal status, create a new name and location for government offices, and form a new council.

=== Local referendums ===
Local governments used local referendums or questionnaire surveys regarding potential mergers to evaluate public opinion. 352 local referendums on merging took place from 1999 to 2006.

=== Great Heisei Amalgamations ===
A vast number of municipal mergers, known as "the great Heisei mergers" (平成の大合併, heisei-no-daigappei), were executed from 1999 to 2010 (the so-called Great Heisei Amalgamations). Municipality numbers dropped from 3,232 to 1,727 during this period.

Due to the Trinity Reform, a series of administrative and financial reforms that significantly affected smaller municipalities after their implementation in the early 2000s, many of these small municipalities had to voluntarily merge with others. The main motivation of the reform was stated as to support small local governments that would become unstable in the event of poor fiscal periods.

From April 1999 to April 2014, there were 188 cases of municipal absorption, and 461 new municipalities. Among them, 582 consolidations were done during the Great Heisei Consolidations period from April 1999 to March 2006. This number includes duplicated consolidations.

==== Amalgamate patterns ====
There were 8 merging patterns during the Great Heisei Amalgamations:

- Merge established by the Merger Council with original members.
- Merge after creating a new Merger Council with new partners.
- Merge in another Merger Council after seceding from the original Merger Council.
- A merger in which the original Merger Council increased in size with new members.
- Continue as independent municipality after seceding from original Merger Council.
- Continue as an independent municipality having not joined a Merger Council.
- Continue as an independent municipality after the Merger Council dissolves.
- Merge on the basis of the Merger Law alone (without a Merger Council).

=== Record of changes ===
- The list of mergers and dissolutions of municipalities in Japan shows mergers and dissolutions of municipalities sorted by prefecture.

=== Naming of new municipalities ===
Naming a new post-merger municipality is not a negligible matter. Disagreement on a name sometimes causes merger talks to break down. If a city is far larger than the towns joining it, no arguments take place; the city's name simply survives. However, if their sizes do not differ significantly, lengthy disputes can ensue. Sometimes, the problem can be solved by adopting the name of the district or compounding the names of the localities to be merged; the latter method is relatively common in Europe, but is unusual in Japan. These compounded names are often abbreviated. For example, the Ōta (大田) ward of Tokyo is a portmanteau of Ōmori (大森) and Kamata (蒲田); Ōkama was not chosen because of its likeness to 'okama', a derogatory word for homosexual. Toyoshina, Nagano, is an acronym of the four antecedent villages: Toba, Yoshino, Shinden, and Nariai.

Another common naming method is borrowing a well known nearby place name and adding a direction, such as in Nishitōkyō ("West Tokyo"), Kitakyūshū ("North Kyūshū"), Higashiōsaka ("East Osaka"), Shikokuchūō ("Central Shikoku") and Higashiōmi ("East Ōmi"). Other towns sometimes use nouns with pleasant connotations, such as peace (平和, heiwa), green (緑, midori), or future (未来, mirai).

A characteristic of the Heisei mergers is a rapid increase of hiragana names. The names of Japan's cities used to be written in Kanji exclusively. The first instance of "hiragana municipalities" was Mutsu (むつ), renamed in 1960. The number of place names using hiragana reached 45 by April 2006, including Tsukuba (つくば), Kahoku (かほく), Sanuki (さぬき), Tsukubamirai (つくばみらい), and Saitama (さいたま), which was upgraded to a designated city in 2003. The creation of Minami Alps in 2003 is the first example of a katakana city name.

== Criticisms ==
Most of Japan's rural municipalities largely depend on subsidies from the central government. They are often criticized for spending money for wasteful public enterprises to keep jobs. The central government, which is itself running budget deficits, has a policy of encouraging mergers to make the municipal system more efficient.

Although the government purports to respect self-determination of the municipalities, some consider the policy to be compulsory. As a result of mergers, some cities such as Daisen, Akita temporarily had very large city assemblies.

Some people see it as a form of federalism; they consider that the ultimate goal is to change Japan into a union consisting of more autonomous states. So far, the mergers have been limited to local municipalities. Mergers of prefectures have been discussed in some regions of Japan.

Suzuki and Ha's empirical research found that municipal merger in Japan during 2008 to 2014 discourages performance of legislative activity and bylaw proposals, using a dataset of 754 Japanese city-level governments. Local councils, after municipal mergers, propose fewer municipal bylaws, showing that these communities produced after municipal mergers appear to experience worse legislative performance. Their research also shows that enlarging municipal size is negatively associated with legislative performance.

Ikuta concluded that, while there are cases of successful mergers that embrace the common characteristics of the region as a whole, there are also many merged municipalities that struggle with a new shared regional image and identity. The Great Heisei Amalgamations were characterized at least in part by misunderstandings of regional brands, resulting in medium- and long-term regional competitiveness for achieving a local identity.

Rausch suggests that post-merger policies need a better framework. He points out an example of the Hirosaki City merger with Iwaki Town and Sōma Village, in which the city tourism policy focused only on images of Hirosaki, resulting in a poor outcome in tourism for the smaller municipalities involved.

== See also ==
- Decentralisation in Japan
