= County seat =

Administrative center for a county or civil parish

A county seat is an administrative center, seat of government, or capital city of a county or civil parish. The term is in use in six countries: the United States, Canada, China, Hungary, Romania and Taiwan. An equivalent term, shire town, is used in the U.S. state of Vermont and in several other English-speaking jurisdictions.

== Canada ==
In Canada, the provinces of Ontario, Quebec, New Brunswick, Prince Edward Island, and Nova Scotia have counties as an administrative division of government below the provincial level, and thus county seats. In the eastern provinces of Prince Edward Island, New Brunswick, and Nova Scotia, the term "shire town" is used in place of county seat.

== China ==
County seats in China are the administrative centers of the counties in the People's Republic of China. They have existed since the Warring States period and were set up nationwide by the Qin dynasty. The number of counties in China proper gradually increased from dynasty to dynasty. As Qin Shi Huang reorganized the counties after his unification, there were about 1,000. Under the Eastern Han dynasty, the number of counties increased to above 1,000. About 1,400 existed when the Sui dynasty abolished the commandery level (郡 jùn), which was the level just above counties, and demoted some commanderies to counties.

In Imperial China, the county was a significant administrative unit because it marked the lowest level of the imperial bureaucratic structure; in other words, it was the lowest level that the government reached. Government below the county level was often undertaken through informal non-bureaucratic means, varying between dynasties. The head of a county was the magistrate, who oversaw both the day-to-day operations of the county as well as civil and criminal cases.

The current number of counties mostly resembled that of the later years of the Qing dynasty. Changes of location and names of counties in Chinese history have been a major field of research in Chinese historical geography, especially from the 1960s to the 1980s. There are 1,355 counties in mainland China out of a total of 2,851 county-level divisions.

== Taiwan ==
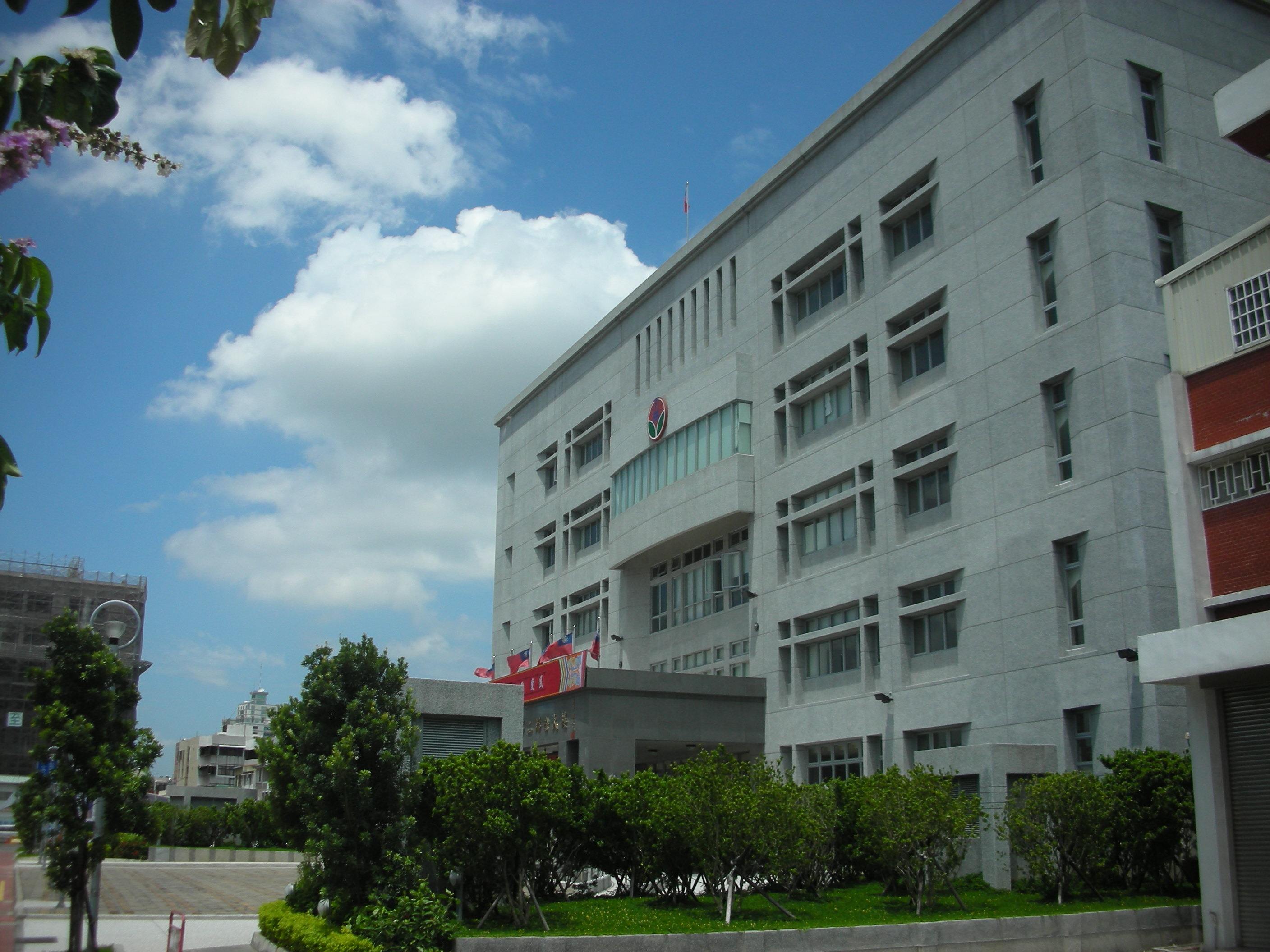
Miaoli, the county seat of Miaoli County in Taiwan

In Taiwan, the first counties were established in 1661 by the Kingdom of Tungning. The later ruler Qing empire inherited this type of administrative division. With the increase of Han Chinese population in Taiwan, the number of counties also grew over time. By the end of the Qing era, there were 11 counties in Taiwan. Protestant missionaries in China first romanized the term as hien. When Taiwan became a Japanese colony in 1895, the hierarchy of divisions also incorporated into the Japanese system in the period when Taiwan was under Japanese rule.

By September 1945, Taiwan was divided into 8 prefectures (州 and 廳), which remained after the Republic of China took over.

There are 13 county seats in Taiwan, which function as county-administered cities, urban townships, or rural townships.

=== Lists of county seats ===
- Changhua City
- Douliu City
- Hualien City
- Jincheng Township
- Magong City
- Miaoli City
- Nangan Township
- Nantou City
- Pingtung City
- Taibao City
- Taitung City
- Yilan City
- Zhubei City

== United States ==
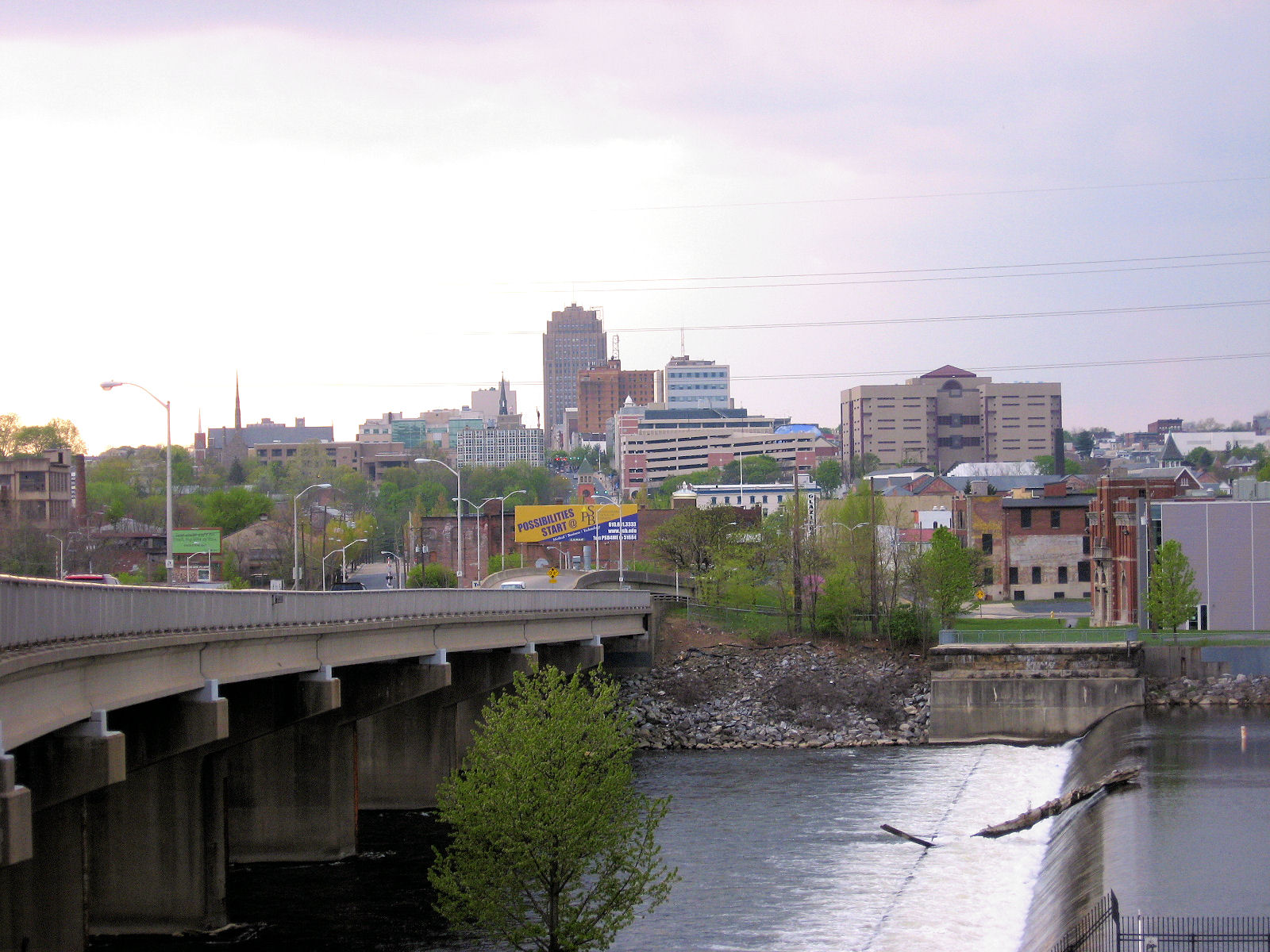
Allentown, Pennsylvania, the third-largest city in Pennsylvania and county seat of Lehigh County

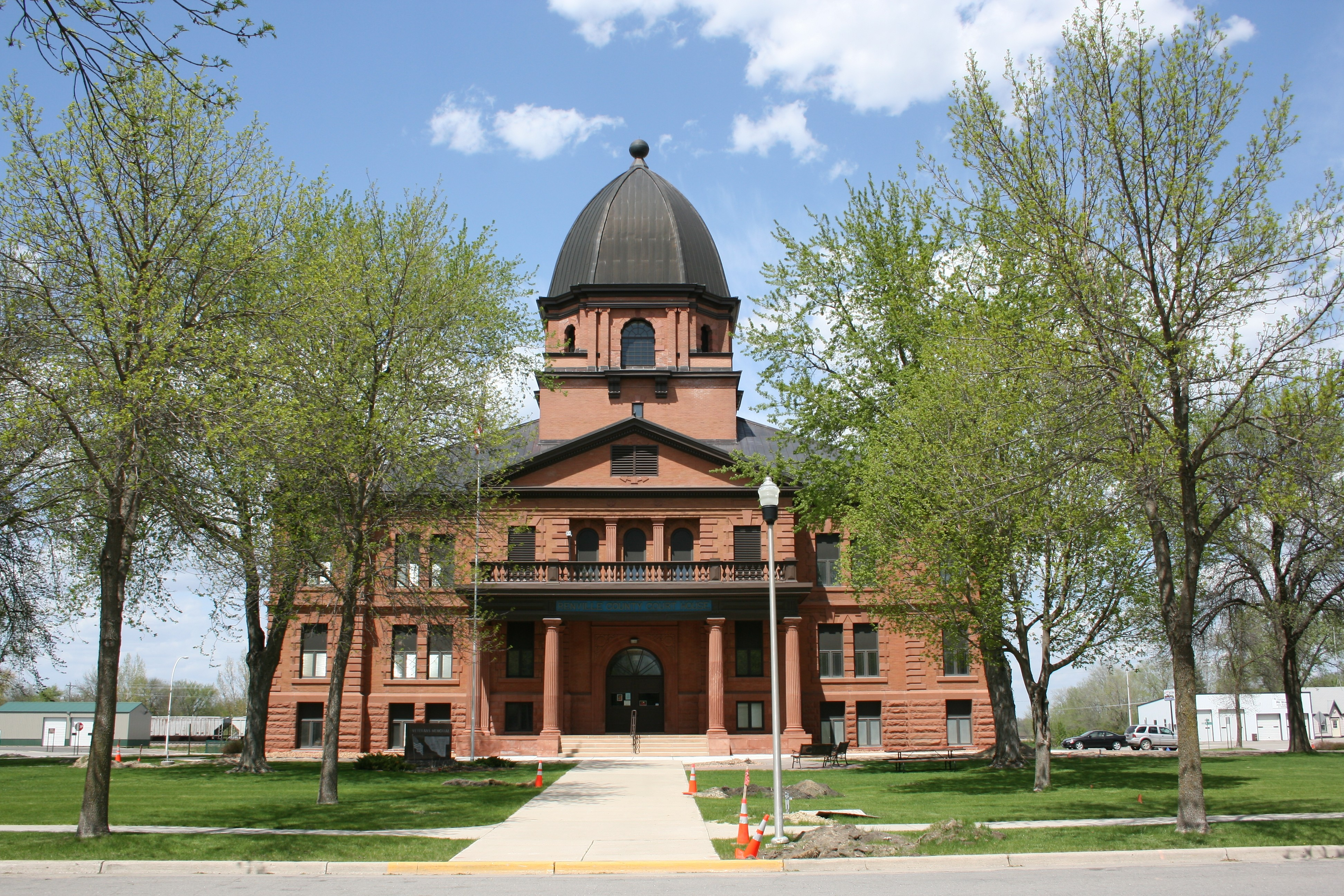
Many county seats in the United States feature a historic courthouse, such as this one in Renville County, Minnesota.

=== Function ===
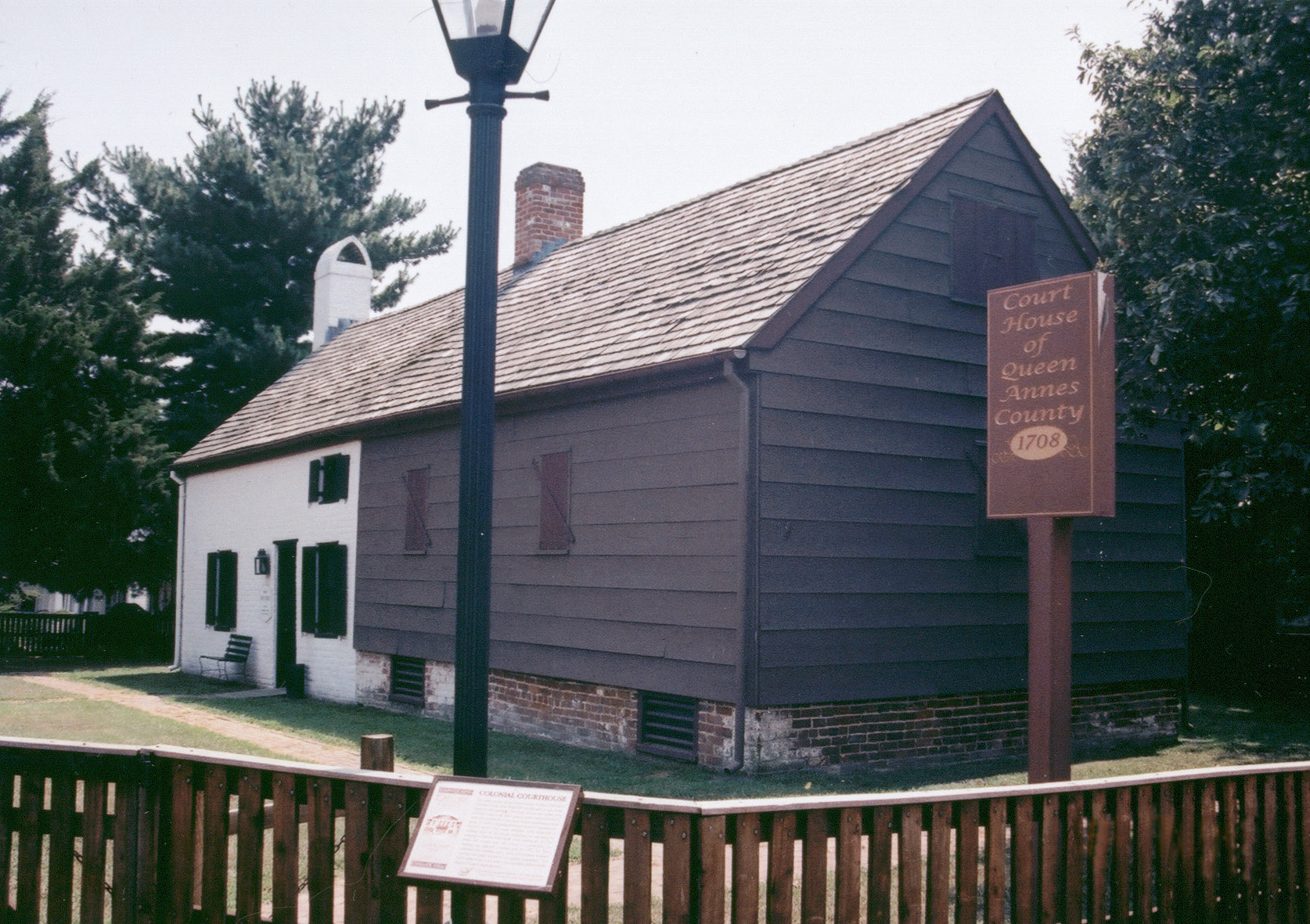
The old courthouse in Centreville, Maryland, the county seat of Queen Anne's County, Maryland, U.S.

In most of the United States, a county is an administrative or political subdivision of a state that consists of a geographic area with specific boundaries and usually some level of governmental authority. The city, town, or populated place that houses county government is known as the seat of its county. Generally, the county legislature, county courthouse, sheriff's department headquarters, hall of records, jail and correctional facility are located in the county seat. However, some functions (such as highway maintenance, which usually requires activity right across the county, as well as a central location from which to deploy vehicles, asphalt, road salt, etc) may be located in other parts of the county, especially if it is geographically large or the county seat is not relatively central and accessible to most parts of the county.

A county seat is usually an incorporated municipality. The exceptions include the county seats of counties that have no incorporated municipalities within their borders, such as Arlington County, Virginia, where the county seat is the entire county. Ellicott City, the county seat of Howard County, Maryland, is the largest unincorporated county seat in the United States, followed by Towson, the county seat of Baltimore County, Maryland. Likewise, some county seats may not be incorporated in their own right, but are located within incorporated municipalities. For example, Cape May Court House, New Jersey, though unincorporated, is a section of Middle Township, an incorporated municipality. In some states, often those that were among the original Thirteen Colonies, county seats include or formerly included "Court House" as part of their name, such as Spotsylvania Courthouse, Virginia.

=== U.S. counties with more than one county seat ===
Most counties have only one county seat. However, some counties in Alabama, Arkansas, Georgia, Iowa, Kentucky, Massachusetts, Mississippi, Missouri, New Hampshire, New York, and Vermont have two or more county seats, usually located on opposite sides of the county. Examples include Harrison County, Mississippi, which has both Biloxi and Gulfport as county seats, and Hinds County, Mississippi, which has both Raymond and the state capital of Jackson. The practice of multiple county seat towns dates from the days when travel was difficult. There have been few efforts to eliminate the two-seat arrangement, since a county seat is a source of civic pride for the towns involved, along with providing employment opportunities.

By virtue of the unique term endemic only to its state, Bennington County, Vermont is the only county in the US to have two "shire towns", being Manchester, Vermont as the North Shire and the eponymously named Bennington as the South Shire; the rugged topography in the rural county necessitates two accessible seats of government.

There are 33 counties with multiple county seats, found in 11 states:

- Coffee County, Alabama
- St. Clair County, Alabama
- Arkansas County, Arkansas
- Carroll County, Arkansas
- Clay County, Arkansas
- Craighead County, Arkansas
- Franklin County, Arkansas
- Logan County, Arkansas
- Mississippi County, Arkansas
- Prairie County, Arkansas
- Sebastian County, Arkansas
- Yell County, Arkansas
- Columbia County, Georgia
- Lee County, Iowa
- Campbell County, Kentucky
- Kenton County, Kentucky
- Essex County, Massachusetts
- Middlesex County, Massachusetts
- Plymouth County, Massachusetts
- Bolivar County, Mississippi
- Carroll County, Mississippi
- Chickasaw County, Mississippi
- Harrison County, Mississippi
- Hinds County, Mississippi
- Jasper County, Mississippi
- Jones County, Mississippi
- Panola County, Mississippi
- Tallahatchie County, Mississippi
- Yalobusha County, Mississippi
- Jackson County, Missouri
- Hillsborough County, New Hampshire
- Seneca County, New York
- Bennington County, Vermont

=== Other variations ===
==== Alaska ====
Alaska is divided into boroughs rather than counties; the county seat in these cases is referred to as the "borough seat"; this includes six consolidated city-borough governments (one of which is styled as a "municipality"). The Unorganized Borough, Alaska, which covers 49% of the state's area, has no borough government or borough seat. One borough, the Lake and Peninsula Borough, has its borough seat located in another borough, namely King Salmon in Bristol Bay Borough.

==== Louisiana ====
In Louisiana, which is divided into parishes rather than counties, county seats are referred to as "parish seats".

==== New England ====
In New England, counties have served mainly as dividing lines for the states' judicial systems. Rhode Island has no county level of government and thus no county seats, and Massachusetts has dissolved many but not all of its county governments. In Vermont, Massachusetts, and Maine county government consists only of a Superior Court and Sheriff (as an officer of the court), both located in a designated "shire town". Bennington County, Vermont has two shire towns; the court for "North Shire" is in the shire town Manchester, and the Sheriff for the county and court for "South Shire" are in the shire town Bennington.

In 2024, Connecticut, which had not defined their counties for anything but statistical, historical and weather warning purposes since 1960, along with ending the use of county seats in particular, will fully transition with the permission of the United States Census Bureau to a system of councils of government for the purposes of boundary definition and as county equivalents.

==== South Dakota ====
Two counties in South Dakota, Oglala Lakota and Todd, have their county seat and government services centered in a neighboring county. Their county-level services are provided by Fall River County and Tripp County, respectively.

==== Virginia ====
In Virginia, a county seat may be an independent city surrounded by, but not part of, the county of which it is the administrative center; for example, Fairfax City is both the county seat of Fairfax County, Virginia and completely surrounded by Fairfax County, but the city is politically independent of the county. When the county seat is in the independent city, government offices such as the courthouse may be in the independent city under an agreement, such as in Albemarle, or may be in enclaves of the county surrounded by the independent city, such as in Fairfax. Others, such as Prince William, have the courthouse in an enclave surrounded by the independent city and have the county government, the Board of Supervisors, in a different part of the county, far from the county seat. The following counties have their county seat in an independent city:

- Albemarle County (Charlottesville)
- Alleghany County (Covington)
- Augusta County (Staunton)
- Fairfax County (Fairfax)
- Frederick County (Winchester)
- Greensville County (Emporia)
- Henry County (Martinsville)
- James City County (Williamsburg)
- Prince William County (Manassas)
- Roanoke County (Salem)
- Rockbridge County (Lexington)
- Rockingham County (Harrisonburg)

Bedford was an independent city from 1968 to 2013, while also being the county seat of Bedford County. Bedford reverted to an incorporated town, and remains the county seat, though it is now part of the county.

=== Lists of U.S. county seats by state ===
The state with the most counties is Texas, with 254, and the state with the fewest counties is Delaware, with 3.

- Alabama
- Alaska
- Arizona
- Arkansas
- California
- Colorado
- Connecticut
- Delaware
- Florida
- Georgia
- Hawaii
- Idaho
- Illinois
- Indiana
- Iowa
- Kansas
- Kentucky
- Louisiana
- Maine
- Maryland
- Massachusetts
- Michigan
- Minnesota
- Mississippi
- Missouri
- Montana
- Nebraska
- Nevada
- New Hampshire
- New Jersey
- New Mexico
- New York
- North Carolina
- North Dakota
- Ohio
- Oklahoma
- Oregon
- Pennsylvania
- Rhode Island
- South Carolina
- South Dakota
- Tennessee
- Texas
- Utah
- Vermont
- Virginia
- Washington
- West Virginia
- Wisconsin
- Wyoming

== See also ==
- Chef-lieu, administrative centres in Algeria, Belgium, France, Luxembourg, Switzerland, and Tunisia
- County seat war, disputes between towns in the formation of the United States
- County town, administrative centres in Ireland and the United Kingdom
