= Local government law =

Local government law may refer to:

- Local Autonomy Law, a Japanese statute
- Local government in the United States
- Local Government (Scotland) Act 1973
