= Decentralisation in Japan =

Government reforms in Japan since 1980s

Decentralisation in Japan is a political reform to gain autonomy of the local territories in Japan. The plan officially began in 1981 because of the 1970s energy crisis and the disparity between Tokyo and other prefectures, that caused to streamline the administration to reduce a fiscal constrain. In 1983, reform committee was created to promote and monitor the plan, then the first stage of reform began in 1993 to 1999. The decentralization law enacted in 2000, which abolished the central government delegation system, but it was perceived as unfinished reform. The Trinity Reform in 2001 tried to solve local finance shortage, but it was unsuccessful.

== History ==
First centralization process in Japan began in Hakuhō period around 7th century. Ritsuryō law system was introduced during this time which modeled from the system of the Emperor of China. In Medieval Japan, three Feudal Japan governments ruled by Shoguns. The last shogunate, Tokugawa shogunate, created the Daimyo system which granted feudal lords to rule the territories. The pressure of foreign traders made Tokugawa gave the power back to Emperor Meiji in 1867.

Meiji Restoration in 1871 made feudal lords turned into a governor over local territories in which became Prefectures of Japan. The Government of Meiji Japan then dismissed all feudal lords to become peerage and appointed new direct-reported governors. In 1873, the new tax law enacted, the local governments were allowed adjust the local tax rate, until 1896, the company tax was transfer to the central government. Itagaki Taisuke led civil moments to create a system of people participation, the Constitution of Japan and the National Diet, in 1889.

In 1919, Japan enacted the first City Planning Law of 1919 and the Urban Area Buildings Law of 1919, both highly centralized, established Japan's modern city planning system. City planning was first applied to regional cities and some municipalities, followed the Tokyo Urban Area Improvement Ordinance under the authority of the Home Ministry. By 1930, the City Planning Law had been applied in 97 cities. A decentralization of city planning started around the Pacific War, from 1930 to 1945, because of military production and other industries became more dispersed, to increase production and reduce vulnerability to bombing. It was the beginning of the comprehensive prefecture and municipality plans. Master plans were designed by local governments, characterized as one of decentralization, in terms of both military industries and city planning.

A reform of local system began in 1929 that the local governments were able to enact ordinances. In 1940, Japan established local distribution tax schemes (chiho-bunyozei) consisting of the refund tax (kanpu-zei) and the allocation tax (haihu-zei). Jinno argues that these are the centralized local tax system, to help a stability of the local governments.

After the World War II ended in 1946, the new Constitution of Japan introduced a directly guaranteed of local governments by Articles 92 to 95 in the Chapter 8. In 1947, the Local Autonomy Act (LAA) was enacted as the fundamental law of local autonomy for unclear principles, firstly, "Local public entities shall have the right to manage their property, affairs and administration and to enact their own regulations within law", secondly, "the right to enact their own regulations within law", thirdly, "the right to enact their own regulations within law." The criticism was it was a dispute which task is in the central government and the local governments. The central government power had a lot more power over local governments.

In 1949, the Shoup Mission recommended that local revenue sources should be strengthened and the subsidy from the central government should be abolished or rationalized. Shoup mentioned that local planning or city planning as an example of administrative services could be fully delegated to local governments. Japanese government then established a Committee to Study Local Administration (Chihô gyôsei Chôsaiin kaigi), called the Kanbe Committee, published "Recommendations on the Reallocation of Administrative Services" (gyôseijimu no saihaibun ni kansuru kankoku) in December 1950. It stated that "City planning and city planning projects shall be the responsibility of municipalities. Laws shall be changed to give municipalities autonomous power to decide and implement matters related to city planning", asserted that the 1919 City Planning Law hindered the autonomy of local entities, but the Government ignored the committee.

The New City Planning Law of 1968 (shin toshi keikaku hô) and the creation of the first National Land Agency (Kokudochô) in 1974 showed an unintentional attempt to decentralize. The City Planning Law in local communities specified public hearings, explanatory meetings, displays of the draft plan, and a system whereby written opinions from the public could be submitted. Even though many attempts to improve local communities were issued, the tax raised in Japan still went 68% to the central government and 32% to local governments. There was a slow improvement on decentralisation, but postwar Japan was still struggling to increase the autonomy level of local communities.

The Local Autonomy Act was also revised in 1969 that required local governments to produce a forward-looking Basic Plan (kihon keikaku) for their long-term economic and social development, to cover a duration of around 25 years. It has to be approved by the elected local council as part of a comprehensive planning that tied to the local fiscal decision.

== Causes ==
The Japan's 1970s energy crisis caused an economic slowdown. The Cabinet discussed streamlining the government entities and functions, one of methods was a decentralization. In 1979, the Local Government System Research Council was established as an advisory of the Prime Minister's Office.

Late 1980s, the bubble economy of Japan made a larger disparity between Tokyo and other prefectures. Early 1990s, the social debate supported a decentralisation process. The supporters believed a centralized system cannot meet different demands from different local communities. Some local leaders were stressed by excessive intervention by the central government. The media criticized wasteful spending of national subsidies as it took much effort to apply for a very small subsidies.

== Reforms ==
In 1981, the Zenkō Suzuki cabinet created the Ad Hoc Commission on Administrative Reform (CAR, Rinji Gyosei Chosakai) to recommend a decentralized reform plan. CAR submitted the final report to the Yasuhiro Nakasone cabinet under the slogan, "Financial reconstruction without tax increases.” Academics read as an early sign of a decentralization. In 1983, the Council for the Promotion of Administrative Reform (CPAR, Gyousei Kaiakaku Suishin Shingikai) was established to replace the CAR to monitor and promote administrative reform.

=== First stage ===
Ikawa pointed that the first stage of decentralisation reform occurred between 1993 and 1999. In March 1993, the Resolution on the Promotion of Decentralization law passed the Diet in both houses. The law has extremely changed the local government system. The 1,500-page bill includes amendments to 475 laws. The relation between the central government and local governments obliging to be changed from a "superior-subordinate relationship of dependency" to a "relationship based on equality and cooperation". However the Liberal Democratic Party failed to form the cabinet after the law passed. The Hosokawa Cabinet, coalition government which was the first non-Liberal Democratic Party (LDP) government of Japan since 1955, tried to promote the 1983 CPAR proposals.

In 1994, the Tomiichi Murayama coalition government from the Social Democratic Party of Japan promoted the fundamental principle (Taiko) of decentralization, one year later, the Diet forced the Cabinet to implement a decentralization plan. The law also created the Decentralization Promotion Committee (DPC) to advise the Cabinet and monitor a progress. LDP won back the head of the government again in 1996, Ryutaro Hashimoto initiated six major themes, administration, fiscal structure, economic structure, social security, financial system, and education which related to a decentralization plan.

==== Decentralization Promotion Committee (DPC) ====
In July - October 1995, the Decentralization Promotion Committee (DPC) were endorsed by Prime Minister. There were seven general committees, two sub-committee.

===== General Committee =====
Chair Ken Moroi, Consultant, Taiheiyo Cement
Vice Chair: Prof. Fukashi Horie, Kyorin University
Keichi Kuwahara, Former Mayor of Fukuoka City
Kusuji Nagasu, Former Governor of Kanagawa Prefecture
Prof. Masaru Nishio, International Christian University
Prof. Keiko Higuchi, Tokyo Kasei University
Soichiro Yamamoto, Former Governor of Miyagi Prefecture.

===== Regional and Community Development Committee =====
Chair Prof. Yoriaki Narita, from Yokohama National University including 13 members (1 business, 4 academics, 2 local government, 3 former central government officials, 2 journalists and 1 labour representative) brought together to examine land use, housing, industrial, transport and telecommunications issues.

===== Life and Welfare Committee =====
Chair Prof. Wataru Omori of Tokyo University including 10 members (3 academics, 2 local government, 2 former central government officials, 2 journalists and 1 labour representative) brought together to examine welfare, health, education, culture, employment and consumption issues.

==== DPC Interim Report ====
In 1996, the Decentralization Promotion Committee (DPC) made the interim report on five reasons to implement decentralisation reform. First, the centralized administrative system were suffering from system fatigue, and was not appropriate for the modern age. Secondly, it clarifies the role of the central government to an international politics. Thirdly, the excessive density in Tokyo and unbalanced land-use were needed to be fixed. Forthly, the promotion of decentralization could empower local societies to show their diverse cultures. Fifthly, it could gain more local creativity. The conclusion was to end "the superior and the subordinate relationship" and to start "relationship based on equality and cooperation."

===== Abolition of Agency Delegated Function System (ADT, Kikan Inin Jimu) =====
The Decentralization Promotion Committee (DPC) played an important role in 1997 as they proposed to repeal the Meiji era's Agency Delegated Function System (ADT, kikan inin jimu.) There were repealed 432 laws in the ADT, replaced by new 298 laws in SGF, and 247 laws in SEF. DPC also proposed the new system, Self-Governing Functions (SGF, Jichi Jimu) and the Statutory Entrusted Functions (SEF, Hotei Jutaku Jimu), and to close the gap of revenue between the central and the locals by using the Local Allocation Tax Grant (LATG). The source of the LATG was a certain percentage of tax revenue from income tax, corporate tax, and the liquor tax. The government formulated the Decentralization Promotion Plan (DPP) in 1998.

===== New Self-Governing Functions (SGF, Jichi Jimu) =====
The SGF are defined as the original business tasks of local entities including tasks not described by the national law. Local governments given full authority in areas such as approving city plans, designation of agricultural promotion areas, and the issuance of permits for new restaurants, hospitals and pharmacies. A total of 398 tasks of this kind were mentioned in the DPP.

===== New Statutory Entrusted Functions (SEF, Hotei Jutaku Jimu) =====
The Statutory Entrusted Functions (SEF) are tasks handled by local governments based on national laws or cabinet orders, but the responsibility is handling by the central government. There are eight features of the SEF described in the decentralization enforcement program in 1998.

- Closely related to control on a national level such as national elections, the issuance of passports, the compilation of government designated statistics, implementation of nationally, determined welfare programmes and the management of national highways.
- National level management such as management of national assets, forestry conservancy, river improvement, complement of environmental standard, supervision of financial institutions, regulation on manufacturing drugs, and narcotics control.
- Security, social insurance, and compensation by the state,
- Contagious disease prevention and drug regulation.
- Involuntary admission to a psychiatric hospital.
- Disaster relieves
- Parts of procedures prior to actions of the nation.
- International agreements.

=== Omnibus Decentralization Law ===
The Omnibus Decentralization Law was enacted on 16 July 1999, and was finally implemented on 1 April 2000. It eliminated administrative functions imposed upon local governments by the central governments and to establish Committee for Settling National-Local Disputes. The issues in the law were an abolition of the Agency Delegated Function System, a review of central government affairs of local governments, a clarification of the roles by central government and local governments, a transfer of the power to local governments, and a review of local regulations and local governments. The principles of the law are to reduce an intervention by the central government to the absolute minimum, to guarantee fairness and transparency in process of document delivery or requesting permission or giving approval. More than 100 laws were revised with the propose to repeal an approval by the central government such as a decision to issue local bond.

Under the Omnibus Decentralization Law, the transfer of central government to local governments caused by the revision of 35 laws, including the Forestry Law, the City Planning Law, and the Child Rearing Allowance Law. For example, the revision of the Forestry Law, a duty to protect or to remove forests was transferred from the central government to prefectures, the revision of the Child Rearing Allowance Law, child support allowances were transferred from prefectures to municipalities. Obligatory regulations were also revised by 38 laws such as the abolish of the obligatory attachment of an agricultural manager to a local agricultural committee.

One of the revised laws was the City Planning Law in June 1999 with the enacted the Package Act to transform city planning administration from a "agency-delegated administrations" (ATD, kikan inin jimu) to the Self-Governing Functions (SGF, Jichi Jimu), in which it increased a level of autonomy.

However, in the end of the first stage of decentralization reform, a financial disparity between the central government and local governments was still large. The tasks that were transferred to local governments needed more financial resources. It was dubbed as "unfinished reform" by one of the members of the Committee for the Promotion of Decentralization (CPD), Nishio Masaru.

==== Municipal amalgamations ====
Based on the Omnibus Decentralization Law, the central government forced municipal amalgamations by using incentive schemes according to special financial measures.

- Grace period to keep an original grant after municipal amalgations, instead of combining two municipalities. If city A received 0, city B received 100, a combine would keep 100, guaranteeing the same amount of grants.
- After amalgations, the issue of special local bonds would be paid through central government grants. There special bonds provided very strong incentive for the implementation of public works to support the new amalgamated municipalities.

=== Trinity Reform ===
In 2001, Junichiro Koizumi cabinet replaced the Decentralization Promotion Committee with the Council for Decentralization Reform (CDR). The Cabinet reexamined and reformed national treasury subsidies and obligatory shares, Local Allocation Tax Grant (LATG), and tax revenue transfer. In 2004, 4.7 trillion yen of national treasury subsidies and obligatory shares was abolished. As a result, the local fiscal reform, called "Trinity Reform"(sanmi ittai kaikaku), was started until 2006. According to Niimura, this reform was also an unsuccessful. Couple of positive results is the transfer of 3 trillion yen of tax revenue to local governments and establishment of a venue for cooperation between the central government and local governments. National treasury subsidies and obligatory shares did not support the growth of the local autonomy. In the end of this reform, the Local Allocation Tax Grants (LATG) were decreased by 21.3%, and the calculation method of LATG has been revised to be more simplify.

=== Second stage ===
From 2006, individual laws were enacted to support decentralisation process, however it produced no strong responses from local governments. The central government proposed to make local governments to be able to gain authority in specific areas and for more deregulation to gain more autonomy level, but this proposal ended early in 2015.

== Local government system ==
=== Local executive organ ===
Assembly: Legislative organ

- The number of local assembly members is to be determined by local ordinance.
- The term of office of local assembly members is 4 years.
- Candidates for election of assembly members must be local resident, at least 25 years old.
- Voters for election of assembly members must be local resident, at least 20 years old.
- The major authorities of the local assembly are creating, amending, and repealing ordinances, approving budgets, authorizing the settlement of accounts, making motions of no confidence against the chief executive, etc.
- Regular sessions are held 4 times a year. Ad-hoc sessions take place as necessary.

Chief executive: Executive organ

- The term of office is 4 years
- Candidates for election of chief executives must be at least 30 years old for prefectural governors, 25 years old for municipal mayors.
- Voters for election of chief executives must be residents and at least 20 years old.
- The major authorities of the chief executive are enacting regulations, submitting bills, implementing budgets, etc.

== Local Allocation Tax Grant ==
The local public finance program (LPFP) stated that, based on the Local Allocation Tax Law, the cabinet has to submit official revenue and expenditure estimates for all local governments to the Diet. Part of the program is the Local Allocation Tax Grant (LATG), an unconditional grant provide to every local governments by fixed calculation. Two main goals are to equalize disparities in fiscal sources and to guarantee a public goods and services. The law requires local governments to provide public goods and services at least to meet the legal obligation.

=== First Step of LATG Calculation ===
First step is to find the R, as the before-distributed LATG, in the formula can be explained by this method.

R = 0.331(I + Cr) + 0.5L + 0.195Cn + Lc

I is revenue from national income tax. Cr is revenue from national corporate tax. L is revenue from liquor tax.

Cn is revenue from national consumption tax. Lc is revenue from local corporate tax.

94% of the LATG is an ordinary local allocation tax grant and 6% is a special local allocation tax grant for unexpected extraordinary expenses. The total amount of the ordinary allocation tax is fixed to an amount equal to revenue shortfalls in the LPFP.

=== Second Step of LATG ===
A formula for calculating method for fiscal needs of local governments, SFN, is as shown below: SFN = U x C x M U is a measurement unit specified for public service. C is a unit cost of services, using a model prefecture and a model municipality. M is a modification coefficient reflecting region-specific conditions.

formula for calculating standard fiscal revenues of local government, SFR, is as follows:

SFR = (0.75 x Β x t) + LTT

0.75 is "reservation ratio," if a coefficient of 1.0 then local governments may not be able to afford to respond to additional fiscal needs and to encourage local governments to develop tax revenue sources. B is estimated tax base and t is standard tax rate for the local tax, combined into the estimated tax revenue of local government. LTT is the local transfer tax revenue, collected nationally but redistributed to local governments on an objective basis.

The final LATG for each governments will be:

LATG = SFN - SFR

== Financial problem ==
Ratio of local public revenue was still one-third of Japan public revenue in 2006, but local governments receive two-thirds of Japan public revenue. It has been financial problem in local government since 1990s. Compared with other high-income countries, Japan local government taxes is exceptionally low, instead, grants from the central government is exceptionally high.

In 2002, local revenue accounts of local taxes, 36%, LATG, 20%, central government disburstments (financial transfers from ministries), 14%, borrowing, 14%, miscellaneous, 13%, and other charges or fees, 3%. Between 1990 and 1995, local taxes, biggest part of local revenue, were ranging between 35 and 37 percent. Because local taxes are from personal and company taxes, which are fluctuating, depending on an economy. In contrast with local bond, it increased every year from 8% to 17%, 1990 to 1995. The LATG also increased as well.

Bond issues by local governments were 70% of local public debt in 2002. 15% of the debt is from local public enterprise, which running on deficits. The Debt-to-GDP ratio of local governments had increased from 15% in 1991 to more than 40% in 2004, represented the equivalent of the gross national income of France.

Due to difficulty of fiscal, many local governments tried to decrease an expense. In 2000, The Tokyo Metropolitan Government reduced the salaries of employees by 4% over two years. In 2002, Tottori prefecture reduced the salaries and bonuses of 11,500 staff members by 5% over three years. In 2006, Osaka Prefecture laded off 3,000 employees, reduced spending on construction projects by 10%. Other way to cove with the difficulty is to add new type of taxes. In 2000, Yokohama city added taxes on betting such as horse racing, pachinko parlors. Tokyo's Minato-ku added tax on cicarette vending machine. Yamanashi prefecture added tax on road. Suginami-ku add 5 yen fee to every plastic bag in supermarket.

Autonomy power to add tax by local governments is still problematic. In 2000, the attempt of the bank tax by Tokyo's governor, Ishihara Shintaro, failed, because the judicial ruling stopped this effort, after twenty-one banks brought the matter to court. Schebath suggests a reforming of tax system that local financial autonomy should be increased. Jinno also suggests that consumption tax and residential tax should be in local government revenue to guarantee stable financial resources.

== Consequents ==
Japan has a two-tier system of local government, 47 prefectures and 1,718 municipalities in 2018, including cities, towns, and villages. There is around 60% of the Japan government expenditure is used on local territories.

Municipalities and prefectures account for approximately 30% and 28% of the overall government budget. The municipal budget comes from intergovernmental transfers, 31%, of which LAGT, 15%, and National Treasury Disbursements, 15%. The remaining 69% of municipal revenue comes from taxation, 34%, bonds, 10%, and other independent resources, 25%. Local taxes consist of income tax, 43%, property tax in municipalities, 44%. Municipal income tax rates are nearly uniform throughout the nation, because local governments cannot determine tax rates, but property tax rates can be adjusted within a limited range, fixed by the central government. Raising bond funds are also limited by the central government.

Since the decentralisation law enacted from 1999 to year 2014, local councils had played a weak role in legislative performance. It is unusual that local councils play an active role as a legislative body, only 9.6% rejected legislation proposed by mayors in 2013, the percentage submitted revisions to mayors was only 18.6% in 2013. Only 11.0% of local councils submitted a bylaw proposal in the same year, instead, most of them depend on the strong role of mayors as a lawmaker and are considered as a rubber stamp for the administrative body.

Based on the basis of a 2006 survey of 408 recently merged municipalities, 60% of these municipal respondents felt that a recent merger on their part had some influence on the image of the municipality, with most indicating a positive effect.

=== Great Heisei Amalgamations ===
Vast number of municipal amalgamations were executed from 1999 to 2010, so called Great Heisei Amalgamations. Municipality numbers were drop from 3,232 to 1,727. Because the reduction of LATG from the Trinity Reform to smaller municipalities, they had to voluntary merge with others. Local governments with low financial capabilities that cannot bear an unstable fiscal was the main motivation.

== Criticisms ==
Ichiro Aoki of the Policy Research Institute Ministry of Finance Japan, criticised the Local Allocation Tax Grant (LATG) which guarantees the ideal income of the local governments that LATG is unsustainable and lack of transparency of a decision-making process. Other points are lack of tax collection in local level, difficulty of prefecture tasks that overlapping with the central government.

Niimura sees that the reform since 1993 to 2006 had been a failure, both financial management and autonomy level. It was not start from "bottom-up", but "top-down", Second, it was pressured because the need to reduce the fiscal trouble from the economic slowdown, third, the dependent character of local governments has remains after the reform. Niimura suggests that local governments should encourage people to participate and collaborate between local governments and local people.

Ikuta concluded that, while there are cases of successful mergers embrace the common characteristics of the region as a whole, there are as well many merged municipalities that struggled with the new shared regional image and identity. The Great Heisei Amalgamations also undertook by misunderstanding of regional brands, medium- and long-term regional competitiveness for achieving the local identity. It needed to be handled with a framework of post-merger period.

Naito and Oki pointed out that current local tax system is not appropriate since Japan is the only country where the local allocation of tax revenues sources is heavily skewed of corporate income taxes which are very volatile revenue source. Naito and Oki suggest that the central governments should adopt federal countries' tax system, to increase the weight of personal income taxes and consumption taxes in local taxes, and reduce the weight of corporate income taxes in local taxes. The method of calculation should gain more opportunities for local governments to participate, or decrease the complex adjustment. They also suggest to limit the allocation taxes, not to surpass the rate of nominal GDP growth.

Shirai concluded growing problems in Japanese local public finance in 4 parts, firstly, current cash-based accounting shows unrealistic financial position of local governments, secondly, LATG for low-income local governments is inefficient and rigid process, thirdly, administrative works related to social security, for example, should be transferred fully to the central government, to generally perform income-redistribution policy more efficiently, fourthly, local ratings and premiums of bond are neither market based nor reflect the soundness of the fiscal position.

== See also ==
- Minister of State for Decentralization Reform
- Administrative divisions of Japan
- Japanese land law
