= Iwaki, Aomori =

Iwaki 岩木町
- Former municipality
- Flag Emblem

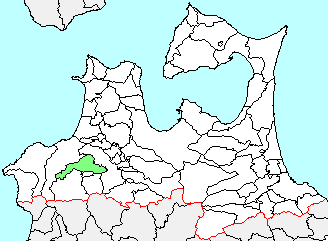
- Location of Iwaki in Aomori Prefecture

- Location in Japan
- Coordinates: 40°36′57.4″N 140°25′16.6″E
- Country: Japan
- Region: Tōhoku
- Prefecture: Aomori Prefecture
- District: Nakatsugaru
- Merged: February 27, 2006 (now part of Hirosaki)

Area
  - Total: 146.25 km^{2} (56.47 sq mi)

Population (February 1, 2006)
  - Total: 11,868
  - Density: 81.15/km^{2} (210.2/sq mi)
- Time zone: UTC+09:00 (JST)
- Symbols
- Bird: Japanese bush-warbler
- Flower: Sakura
- Tree: Ume

Iwaki (岩木町, Iwaki-machi) was a town located in Nakatsugaru District in southern Aomori Prefecture, Japan.

Iwaki was located in south-western Tsugaru Peninsula, in the foothills of Mount Iwaki. The area was part of Hirosaki Domain during the Edo period. After the Meiji Restoration, Iwaki Village was created in 1889.

On February 27, 2006, Iwaki, along with the neighboring village of Sōma (also from Nakatsugaru District), was merged into the expanded city of Hirosaki, and thus no longer exists as an independent municipality.

At the time of its merger, Iwaki had an estimated population of 11,868 and a population density of 81.15 persons per km^{2}. The total area was 146.25 km^{2}. The town economy was dominated by agriculture and forestry.
