= Sōma, Aomori =

Former village in Aomori Prefecture, Japan

Sōma 相馬村
- Former municipality
- Flag Seal

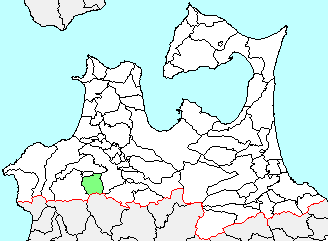
- Location of Sōma in Aomori Prefecture

- Location in Japan
- Coordinates: 40°35′6.7″N 140°23′49.8″E
- Country: Japan
- Region: Tōhoku
- Prefecture: Aomori Prefecture
- District: Nakatsugaru
- Merged: February 27, 2006 (now part of Hirosaki)

Area
  - Total: 103.54 km^{2} (39.98 sq mi)

Population (February 1, 2006)
  - Total: 3,818
  - Density: 36.87/km^{2} (95.5/sq mi)
- Time zone: UTC+09:00 (JST)
- Symbols
- Bird: Common cuckoo
- Flower: Far East Amur adonis
- Tree: Katsura

Sōma (相馬村, Sōma-mura) was a village located in Nakatsugaru District in southern Aomori Prefecture, Japan.

== Geography ==
Sōma was located in southern Tsugaru Peninsula, on the border of Akita Prefecture.

== History ==
The area was part of Hirosaki Domain during the Edo period. After the Meiji Restoration, Sōma Village was created in 1889.

On February 1, 2006, Sōma, along with the neighboring town of Iwaki (also from Nakatsugaru District), was merged into the expanded city of Hirosaki, and thus no longer exists as an independent municipality.

== Population ==
At the time of its merger, Sōma had an estimated population of 3,818 and a density of 36.87 persons per km^{2}. The total area was 103.54 km^{2}. The village economy was dominated by agriculture.
