= Mura uke seido =

System for collecting taxes from villages during the Edo period of Japan

Mura-uke seido
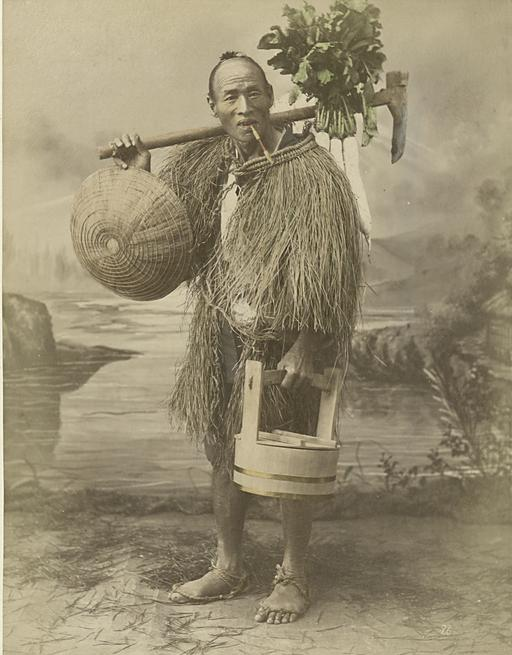
- Japanese farmer in the 1890s
- Date: 17th–19th centuries
- Location: Japan
- Cause: Tokugawa shogunate's need for efficient tax collection
- Outcome: Abolished in 1873 with the Meiji Land Tax Reform

An 18th century tribute demand issued under this system

Mura uke seido (Japanese: 村請制度, Hepburn: mura uke seido), or mura uke sei (村請制), was a system for collecting taxes from villages during the Edo period of Japan. Under this system, tax payments, in the form of a portion of their crops, would be made by the village as a unit, and were therefore the collective responsibility of each respective village subjected to it. The amount would be collected by the village headman to be given to their local lord. If a household or individual were to be indigent or otherwise unable to provide tribute, the remaining residents of the village would have been required to contribute their portion of the village's tax burden. This contributed to the development of a communal culture characterized by altruism, mutual respect and sociality, as the system effectively compelled the affluent members of the village to assist the otherwise penurious members, so the tax burden could be met.

== History ==
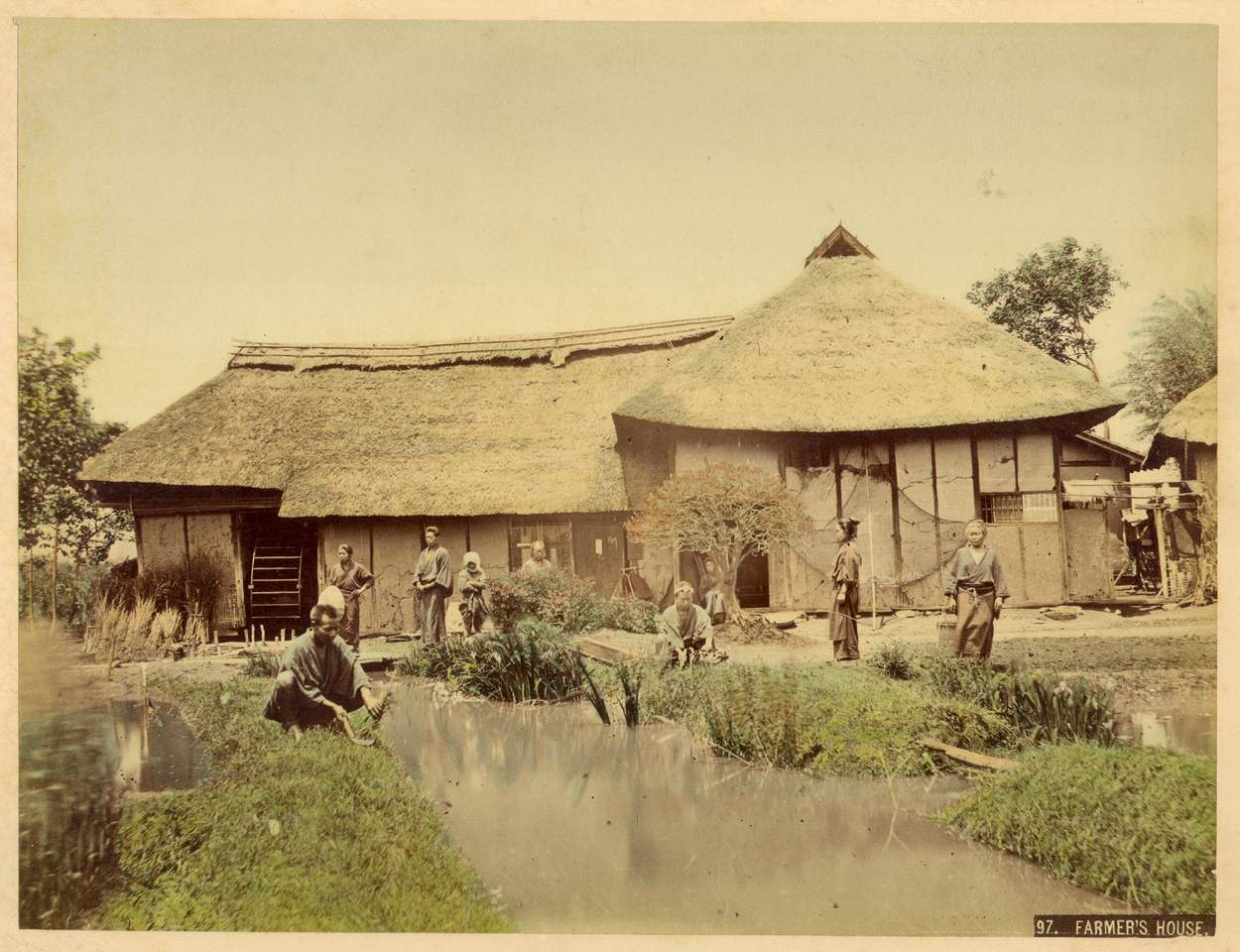
A 19th century village, which would have been subjected to mura uke seido

Mura-uke-seido started under the Tokugawa Shogunate and was characterized by the fact that villagers paid taxes to their local lords based on crop yield, of which would be determined by a lesser person of the local court performing a land survey. The village head would then be delivered a letter annually demanding an amount be paid by his village.

The nature and specifics of this system varied on a village-by-village basis, typically falling into two categories. While in some villages, taxes would be paid based on a self-reported crop yield, after a baseline was established by the land survey, in other villages, the amount of tribute due would be determined by the initial survey without adjusting based on crop yield, unchanging until further notice. The choice of the method for each village would be made off the assumption that the method selected would generate more tax revenue for each respective village.

Under the fixed-system, villagers were encouraged to cultivate and develop more farmland, as any excess produced would not factor into the calculation for the amount of tribute to be given to the lord. The increased productivity of villages, as well as the enhanced tax efficiency achieved by consolidating tax collection for the entire village through a single intermediary, obviating the need for verifying individual contributions, encouraged more lords to adopt this system.

The Meiji government supplanted mura-uke-seido with the Japanese Land Tax Reform of 1873, two years after the abolition of the feudal system, and thus establishing the right to privately own land.
