= Nakatsugaru District, Aomori =

District in Aomori prefecture, Japan

Coordinates: 40°30′54″N 140°15′18″E

- Japan > Tōhoku region > Aomori Prefecture > Nakatsugaru District

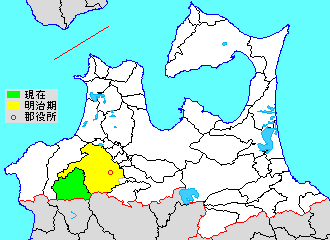
Map showing original extent of Nakatsugaru District in Aomori Prefecture green - current green/yellow - former extent in early Meiji period: 1. - Nishimeya

Nakatsugaru District (中津軽郡, Nakatsugaru-gun) is a rural district located in Aomori Prefecture, Japan.

As of September 2013, the district had an estimated population of 1,505 and an area of 246.05 km^{2}. Much the city of Hirosaki was formerly part of Nakatsugaru District. In terms of national politics, the district is represented in the Diet of Japan's House of Representatives as a part of the Aomori 3rd district.

== Towns and villages ==
- Nishimeya

== History ==
The area of Nakatsugaru District was formerly part of Mutsu Province. At the time of the Meiji restoration of 1868, the area consisted of one town and 134 villages, all under the control of Hirosaki Domain. Aomori Prefecture was founded on December 13, 1871, and Nakatsugaru District was carved out for former Tsugaru District on October 30, 1878.

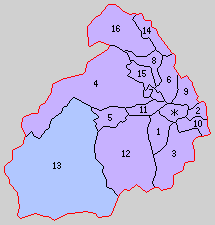
Historic Map of Nakatsugaru District: 1. Shimizu; 2. Toyoda; 3. Chitose; 4. Iwaki; 5. Higashimeya; 6. Fujishiro; 7. Ōura; 8. Takasugi; 9. Watoku; 10. Horigoshi; 11. Komagoshi; 12. Soma; 13. Nishimeya; 14. Niina; 15. Funasawa; 16. Susono; * - Hirosaki-shi purple - Hirosaki-shi blue - Nishimeya-mura

With the establishment of the municipality system on April 1, 1889, Nakatsugaru District, organized into one city (Hirosaki) and 16 villages, were established.

- March 1, 1955 – The villages of Shimizu, Watoku, Toyoda, Horikoshi, Chitose, Fujishiro, Niina, Funasawa, Takasugi, Susono, Higashimeya were annexed by Hirosaki; The villages of Ōura and Komagoshi were merged into Iwaki.
- February 1, 1961 - Iwaki was elevated to town status
- February 27, 2006 - Iwaki and the village of Sōma were annexed by the city of Hirosaki

| 明治22年以前 Prior to Meiji 22 (1889) | 明治22年4月1日 April 1, Meiji 22 | 明治22年 - 昭和19年 Meiji 22 - Showa 19 (1889 - 1944) | 昭和20年 - 昭和64年 Showa 20 - Showa 64 (1945 - 1989) | | 平成1年 - 現在 Heisei 1 - Present (1989–Present) | 現在 Present |
|---|---|---|---|---|---|---|
| | 弘前市 City of Hirosaki | 弘前市 City of Hirosaki | 弘前市 City of Hirosaki | 弘前市 City of Hirosaki | 平成18年2月27日 弘前市 February 27, Heisei 18 (2006); City of Hirosaki | 弘前市 City of Hirosaki |
| | 清水村 Village of Kiyomizu | 清水村 Village of Kiyomizu | 昭和30年3月1日 弘前市に編入 March 1, Showa 30; Incorporated into City of Hirosaki | 弘前市 City of Hirosaki | 平成18年2月27日 弘前市 February 27, Heisei 18 (2006); City of Hirosaki | 弘前市 City of Hirosaki |
| | 和徳村 Village of Watoku | 和徳村 Village of Watoku | 昭和30年3月1日 弘前市に編入 March 1, Showa 30; Incorporated into City of Hirosaki | 弘前市 City of Hirosaki | 平成18年2月27日 弘前市 February 27, Heisei 18 (2006); City of Hirosaki | 弘前市 City of Hirosaki |
| | 豊田村 Village of Toyoda | 豊田村 Village of Toyoda | 昭和30年3月1日 弘前市に編入 March 1, Showa 30; Incorporated into City of Hirosaki | 弘前市 City of Hirosaki | 平成18年2月27日 弘前市 February 27, Heisei 18 (2006); City of Hirosaki | 弘前市 City of Hirosaki |
| | 堀越村 Village of Horikoshi | 堀越村 Village of Horikoshi | 昭和30年3月1日 弘前市に編入 March 1, Showa 30; Incorporated into City of Hirosaki | 弘前市 City of Hirosaki | 平成18年2月27日 弘前市 February 27, Heisei 18 (2006); City of Hirosaki | 弘前市 City of Hirosaki |
| | 千年村 Village of Chitose | 千年村 Village of Chitose | 昭和30年3月1日 弘前市に編入 March 1, Showa 30; Incorporated into City of Hirosaki | 弘前市 City of Hirosaki | 平成18年2月27日 弘前市 February 27, Heisei 18 (2006); City of Hirosaki | 弘前市 City of Hirosaki |
| | 藤代村 Village of Fujishiro | 藤代村 Village of Fujishiro | 昭和30年3月1日 弘前市に編入 March 1, Showa 30; Incorporated into City of Hirosaki | 弘前市 City of Hirosaki | 平成18年2月27日 弘前市 February 27, Heisei 18 (2006); City of Hirosaki | 弘前市 City of Hirosaki |
| | 新和村 Village of Niina | 新和村 Village of Niina | 昭和30年3月1日 弘前市に編入 March 1, Showa 30; Incorporated into City of Hirosaki | 弘前市 City of Hirosaki | 平成18年2月27日 弘前市 February 27, Heisei 18 (2006); City of Hirosaki | 弘前市 City of Hirosaki |
| | 船沢村 Village of Funasawa | 船沢村 Village of Funasawa | 昭和30年3月1日 弘前市に編入 March 1, Showa 30; Incorporated into City of Hirosaki | 弘前市 City of Hirosaki | 平成18年2月27日 弘前市 February 27, Heisei 18 (2006); City of Hirosaki | 弘前市 City of Hirosaki |
| | 高杉村 Village of Takasugi | 高杉村 Village of Takasugi | 昭和30年3月1日 弘前市に編入 March 1, Showa 30; Incorporated into City of Hirosaki | 弘前市 City of Hirosaki | 平成18年2月27日 弘前市 February 27, Heisei 18 (2006); City of Hirosaki | 弘前市 City of Hirosaki |
| | 裾野村 Village of Susuno | 裾野村 Village of Susuno | 昭和30年3月1日 弘前市に編入 March 1, Showa 30; Incorporated into City of Hirosaki | 弘前市 City of Hirosaki | 平成18年2月27日 弘前市 February 27, Heisei 18 (2006); City of Hirosaki | 弘前市 City of Hirosaki |
| | 岩木村 Village of Iwaki | 岩木村 Village of Iwaki | 昭和30年3月1日 岩木村 March 1, Showa 30 (1955); Village of Iwaki | 昭和36年2月1 町制 February 1, Showa 36 (1961); Town Status | 平成18年2月27日 弘前市 February 27, Heisei 18 (2006); City of Hirosaki | 弘前市 City of Hirosaki |
| | 大浦村 Village of Ōura | 大浦村 Village of Ōura | 昭和30年3月1日 岩木村 March 1, Showa 30 (1955); Village of Iwaki | 昭和36年2月1 町制 February 1, Showa 36 (1961); Town Status | 平成18年2月27日 弘前市 February 27, Heisei 18 (2006); City of Hirosaki | 弘前市 City of Hirosaki |
| | 駒越村 Village of Komagoshi | 駒越村 Village of Komagoshi | 昭和30年3月1日 岩木村 March 1, Showa 30 (1955); Village of Iwaki | 昭和36年2月1 町制 February 1, Showa 36 (1961); Town Status | 平成18年2月27日 弘前市 February 27, Heisei 18 (2006); City of Hirosaki | 弘前市 City of Hirosaki |
| | 相馬村 Village of Sōma | 相馬村 Village of Sōma | 相馬村 Village of Sōma | 相馬村 Village of Sōma | 平成18年2月27日 弘前市 February 27, Heisei 18 (2006); City of Hirosaki | 弘前市 City of Hirosaki |
| | 東目屋村 Village of Higashimeya | 東目屋村 Village of Higashimeya | 昭和30年3月1日 弘前市に編入 March 1, Showa 30; Incorporated into City of Hirosaki | | 平成18年2月27日 弘前市 February 27, Heisei 18 (2006); City of Hirosaki | 弘前市 City of Hirosaki |
| | 西目屋村 Village of Nishimeya | 西目屋村 Village of Nishimeya | 西目屋村 Village of Nishimeya | 西目屋村 Village of Nishimeya | 西目屋村 Village of Nishimeya | 西目屋村 Village of Nishimeya |
