= Committee for Settling National-Local Disputes =

Government board in Japan

The Committee for Settling National-Local Disputes (国地方係争処理委員会, kuni chihō keisō shori i'inkai) is a review board affiliated with the Ministry of Internal Affairs and Communications of Japan. It is responsible for resolving disputes between the national government and local authorities regarding grants (or denied grants) of national government authority to local governments.

Under the Local Autonomy Law, the committee is appointed by the Internal Affairs Minister with the consent of both houses of the Diet. It consists of five part-time members (although two may be made full-time as necessary) who serve for a term of three years. Decisions are made by a simple majority of members present at a meeting, with a quorum requirement of three members (including the chairman).

Any local government may petition the Committee within thirty days of the act which is being contested. The Committee must then make its determination on the matter within ninety days and either (1) notify the responsible government agency of the illegality of the act, (2) notify all parties that the act is proper, or (3) issue a conciliation proposal to the parties. A party dissatisfied with the ruling may appeal to a High Court within 30 days.

Since its inception in 2000, the committee has heard only one petition. This petition was filed by the City of Yokohama in 2001, and ultimately ordered Internal Affairs Minister Toranosuke Katayama to revisit a previous denial of permission to impose a municipal tax on horse betting.
