= Land Tax Reform =

Taxation reforms in Japan in 1873

The Japanese Land Tax Reform of 1873, or chisokaisei (地租改正) was started by the Meiji Government in 1873, or the 6th year of the Meiji period. It was a major restructuring of the previous land taxation system, and established the right of private land ownership in Japan for the first time.

== Previous land taxation system ==
The land taxation system was first established during the Taika Reform in 645 along with the adoption of the Chinese judicial system known as the ritsuryō codes (律令国家, ritsuryōkokka). The previous system was an imitation of the Tang dynasty's corvée taxation system, known as the soyōchō system (租庸調, soyōchō). Taxes were paid in the form of rice and other crops under this system, and the tax rates were determined through the land survey created by Toyotomi Hideyoshi. A proportionate annual tax was assessed according to the yield of a given plot of land. The principal farmer's name was registered in the land survey, and that farmer would be held accountable for the land tax. The payment could also be held as part of the village's collective responsibility under the Murauke System (村請制, Muraukesei).

== Announcement of the reform ==
The Meiji Government announced the reformation of the land taxation system in 1873 as part of the Meiji Daijōkan Ordinances (太政官布告, daijōkan fukoku). Efforts at instating the system began the following year.

The government initially ordered individual farmers to measure the plots of their land themselves, calculate their taxes, and submit the results to local tax officials. However, difficulties arose with the honesty of the measuring system when the 1874 budget showed that collected taxes fell far below projected values.

The government responded by establishing a land tax reform department in 1875, and began aggressive efforts to install the system. Under the direction of the new department, each prefecture was assigned a set amount of taxes it was required to collect. The department forcefully changed land values to meet the set amount if values reported by farmers did not meet projected values. This caused widespread resentment among farmers, and several large-scale riots erupted around the country. In January 1877, the government lowered the tax rate from 3% to 2.5% in an effort to regain support for the land tax.

The department's aggressive system continued through 1878, but the strictness of rules gradually decreased as it became clear that required amounts would be met. The reforms had taken complete effect by 1880, seven years after the start of the reforms.

== Changes from previous taxation ==
As mentioned earlier, taxes were paid in rice and crops until the end of the Edo period, and the cultivator was held as the taxpayer under the previous system. Taxation was also inconsistent, as values differed in certain regions of the country. The new land tax created a uniform system which taxed landowners based on the worth of their land, and were paid in cash instead of crops.

The main changes between the two systems are as follows:

- Taxes were calculated as a proportion of the cash value of the land based on harvest potential, rather than the actual crop yield.
- A cash-based system over payment with crops.
- A uniformly set tax rate at 3%; a reduction from the previous system.
- The landowner, confirmed by the issuance of land bonds, was liable for the taxes instead of the farmer.
- The system was standardized across Japan.

== Reform effects ==
=== Stabilization of tax revenue ===
The government could be assured of a steady income because the tax was set at a constant rate against the value of the land, and revenue did not fluctuate with crop yields since tax income became independent of crop fluctuation. Essentially, the risks of crop fluctuation were pushed from the government to the farmer.

The land tax reform ended up increasing the burden on villages with hunter-gatherer lifestyles in uncultivated lands, and resulted in several farmer insurrections against the Meiji government, including the Ise Revolt (伊勢暴動, Ise bōdō) and the Makabe Revolt (真壁暴動, makabe bōdō). The discontent also helped fuel the Freedom and People's Rights Movement (自由民権運動, jiyūminken'undō). The Meiji government lowered the tax rate to 2.5% in 1877 in fear of further revolts.

=== Private ownership of land ===
Private land ownership was recognized for the first time in Japan with the issuing of land titles. The previous practice of land ownership was the Public Land Public Citizen Laws (公地公民制, kōchikōminsei), which stated that all land was under the sole ownership of the emperor, such that individual farmers were merely borrowing the land from feudal lords, who in turn were borrowing the land from the emperor. The reform abolished this archaic system of land ownership, and began to allow landowners to use their property as a financial asset in collateral or other investment. This law was one of the first steps towards the development of capitalism in Japan, paralleling the English (and later United Kingdom) statute Quia Emptores enacted several centuries earlier.

Prior to the enactment of the land tax reform, the unilateral ban on trading and selling farmland was rescinded in 1872, and the use of real estate as collateral for agricultural loans was legalized in 1873.

=== Suffrage rights ===
The previous feudal contract system became obsolete because the landowner was the one held responsible for taxes, and gave landowners the right to participate in politics. Later when the Imperial Diet was established, many of those given the right to vote in the lower house belonged to this landowning class.

=== Commerce and circulation of currency ===
In the previous system, rice and crops collected from each fiefdom were sold and distributed by wholesale dealers via daimyō storehouses in Edo or Osaka. The reform allowed farmers to sell their crops for cash directly to local merchants, and had a large effect on Japanese commerce.

== Establishment of land bonds ==
Face of a land bond issued in 1879. back

Land bonds (地券, chiken) began to be recorded in a registry as a result of the land surveys implemented by the land tax reform. These land bonds created a system of verifiable land ownership, indicated the person responsible for taxes, and established buying and selling rights, allowing real estate commerce and credit to become dependent on these bonds.

The land bond registry was dissolved in 1889 after its duties were handed over to the land register department in 1884. Payment of taxes was managed solely by this new department until 1961. All addresses, zoning classifications, and acreage information were transferred to the land register department, so it can be said that current Japanese land ownership records are directly traceable to the land tax reform.

However, details in the registry were not always accurate because of the primitive surveying techniques used by farmers at the start of the reform. This was both due to time and personnel limitation, and deliberate tax evasion attempts, ("rope stretching" (縄伸び, nawa nobi) and "rope shrinking" (縄縮み, nawa chijimi)) resulting in inaccuracies in the modern registry. The Land Registry Inquiry (地籍調査, chisekichōsa) is currently underway to create an accurate registry for all of Japan.
