= Administrative divisions of Japan =

The bureaucratic administration of Japan is divided into three basic levels: national, prefectural, and municipal. They are defined by the Local Autonomy Act of 1947.

Below the national government there are 47 prefectures, six of which are further subdivided into subprefectures to better service large geographical areas or remote islands.

The 1718 municipalities (792 cities, 743 towns, and 183 villages) and 23 special wards of Tokyo are the lowest level of government; the twenty most-populated cities outside Tokyo Metropolis are known as designated cities, and are subdivided into wards.

== Prefectural divisions ==
47 prefectural entities of Japan

The top tier of administrative divisions are the 47 prefectural entities: 43 prefectures (県, ken) proper, two urban prefectures (府, fu, Osaka and Kyōto), one "circuit" (道, dō, Hokkaidō), and one "metropolis" (都, to, Tokyo Metropolis). Although different in name, they are functionally the same.

=== Ken ===
"Prefecture" (県, ken) are the most common types of prefectural divisions total of 43 ken. The kanji (character) from which this is derived means "county".

=== To ===
Tokyo Metropolis is referred to as a "metropolis" (都, to) after the dissolution of Tokyo City in 1943, Tōkyō-fu (Tokyo Prefecture) was upgraded into Tōkyō-to and the former Tokyo City's wards were upgraded into special wards. The kanji (character) from which this is derived means "capital".

=== Fu ===
Osaka Prefecture and Kyoto Prefecture are referred to as an "urban prefecture" (府, fu). The Chinese character from which this is derived implies a core urban zone of national importance in the middle period of China, or implies a subdivision of a province in the late period of China.

=== Dō ===
Hokkaido is referred to as a "circuit" (道, dō), this term was originally used to refer to Japanese regions consisting of several provinces. This was also a historical usage of the character in China meaning circuit.

== Subprefectural divisions ==
There are only two types of subprefectural divisions: subprefecture and district.

=== Subprefecture ===
Subprefectures (支庁, shichō) are a Japanese form of self-government which focuses on local issues below the prefectural level. It acts as part of the greater administration of the state and as part of a self-government system.

=== District ===
Districts (郡, gun) were administrative units in use between 1878 and 1921 that were roughly equivalent to the counties of China or the United States. In the 1920s, municipal functions were transferred from district offices to the offices of the towns and villages within the district. District names remain in the postal address of towns and villages, and districts are sometimes used as boundaries for electoral districts, but otherwise serve no official function. The Classical Chinese character from which this is derived means commandery.

== Municipal divisions ==
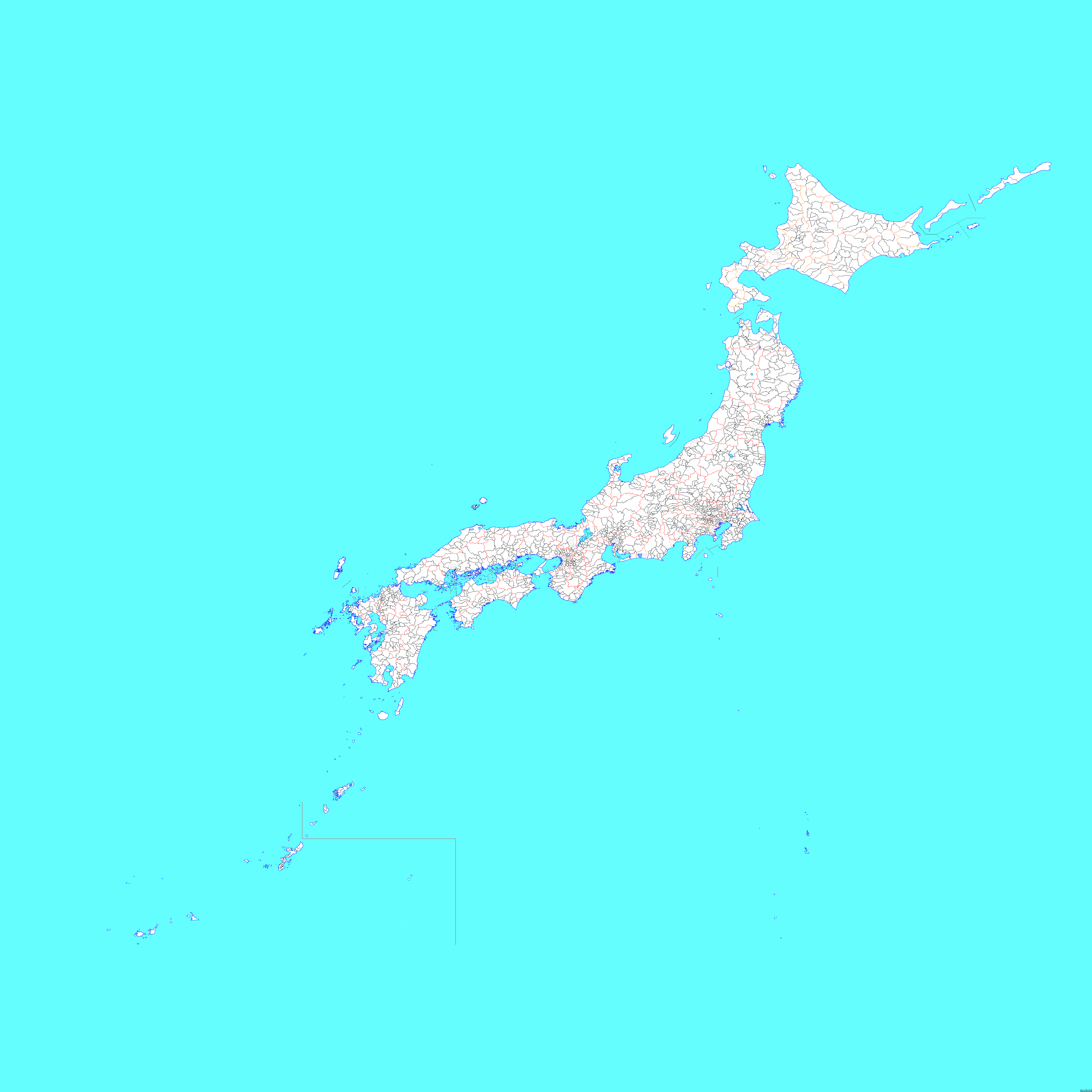
1,742 municipal and 175 submunicipal entities of Japan

The municipal divisions are divided into three main categories: city, town, and village. However, the city entities are further categorized. The Special wards of Tokyo are also considered to be municipal divisions.

=== Cities ===
Cities in Japan are categorized into four different types, from the highest the designated city, the core city, the special city, and the regular city at the lowest.

==== Designated city ====
A city designated by government ordinance (政令指定都市, seirei shitei toshi), also known as a designated city (指定都市, shitei toshi) or government ordinance city (政令市, seirei shi), is a Japanese city that has a population greater than 500,000 and has been designated as such by an order of the cabinet of Japan under Article 252, Section 19 of the Local Autonomy Law. Designated cities are also subdivided into wards.

==== Core city ====
A core city (中核市, Chūkakushi) is a Japanese city that has a population greater than 300,000 and an area greater than 100 square kilometers, although special exceptions may be made by order of the cabinet for cities with populations under 300,000 but over 200,000. This category was created by the first clause of Article 252, Section 22 of the Local Autonomy Law of Japan.

==== Special city ====
A special city (特例市, Tokureishi) of Japan is a city with a population of at least 200,000. This category was established by the Local Autonomy Law, article 252 clause 26.

==== City ====
A city (市, shi) is a local administrative unit in Japan with a population of at least 50,000 of which at least 60% of households must be established in a central urban area, and at least 60% of households must be employed in commerce, industry or other urban occupations. Cities are ranked on the same level as towns (町, machi) and villages (村, mura); the only difference is that they are not a component of districts (郡, gun). Like other contemporary administrative units, they are defined by the Local Autonomy Law of 1947.

=== Town ===
A town (町, chō or machi) is a local administrative unit in Japan. It is a local public body along with prefecture (ken or other equivalents), city (shi), and village (mura). Geographically, a town is contained within a prefecture.

=== Village ===
A village (村, mura, sometimes son) is a local administrative unit in Japan. It is a local public body along with prefecture (県, ken, or other equivalents), city (市, shi), and town (町, chō, sometimes machi). Geographically, a village's extent is contained within a prefecture. It is larger than an actual settlement, being in actuality a subdivision of a rural district (郡, gun), which are subdivided into towns and villages with no overlap and no uncovered area.

=== Special Ward ===
The special wards (特別区, tokubetsu-ku) are 23 municipalities that together make up the core and the most populous part of Tokyo Metropolis, Japan. Together, they occupy the land that was originally the Tokyo City before it was abolished in 1943 to become part of the newly created Tokyo Metropolis. The special wards' structure was established under the Japanese Local Autonomy Act and is unique to Tokyo Metropolis.

== Submunicipal divisions ==
=== Ward ===
A ward (区, ku) is a subdivision of the cities of Japan that are large enough to have been designated by government ordinance.

== History ==
Although the details of local administration have changed dramatically over time, the basic outline of the current two-tiered system since the abolition of the han system by the Meiji government in 1871 are similar. Before the abolition of the han system, Japan was divided into provinces (国, kuni) then subdivided into districts (郡, gun) and then villages (里/郷, sato) at the bottom.

== Structural hierarchy ==
Prefectural	Subprefectural		Municipal	Submunicipal
Prefectures (excluding Tokyo Metropolis)	Subprefecture		"designated city"	Ward
Prefectures (excluding Tokyo Metropolis)	District		Town; Village	none
Prefectures (excluding Tokyo Metropolis)	Subprefecture	District	Town; Village	none
Prefectures (excluding Tokyo Metropolis)	Subprefecture		"core city" "special city" City	none
Metropolis			City; Special wards	none
Metropolis	District; Subprefecture		Town; Village	none

Level	Type	Kanji	Romaji	No.	
Prefectural	Tokyo Metropolis	都	to	1	Tokyo (東京都 Tōkyō-to)
Prefectural	"circuit"	道	dō	1	Hokkaido (北海道 Hokkaidō)
Prefectural	"urban prefecture"	府	fu	2	Kyoto Prefecture (京都府 Kyōto-fu) and Osaka Prefecture (大阪府 Ōsaka-fu)
Prefectural	Prefecture	県	ken	43	Prefectures except Tokyo, Hokkaido, Kyoto Prefecture and Osaka Prefecture
Subprefectural	Subprefecture	支庁	shichō	158	
Subprefectural	District	郡	gun	374	
Municipal	"designated city"	政令指定都市	seirei shitei toshi	20	
Municipal	"core city"	中核市	chūkaku-shi	42	
Municipal	"special city"	特例市	tokurei-shi	40	
Municipal	City	市	shi	792	Including designated, core and special cities.
Municipal	Town	町	chō or machi	743	
Municipal	Village	村	mura or son	183	
Municipal	Special ward	区 (特別区)	ku (tokubetsu-ku)	23	Special wards of Tokyo (東京都区部 Tōkyō-to kubu), 23 wards of Tokyo (東京23区 Tōkyō nijūsan-ku)
Submunicipal	Ward	区 (行政区)	ku (gyōsei-ku)	175	Only used for designated cities

ISO	Prefecture	Kanji	Region	Cities [all-types] (Special wards)	Wards	Districts	Towns	Villages
JP-23	Aichi	愛知県	Chūbu	38	16	7	14	2
JP-05	Akita	秋田県	Tōhoku	13		6	9	3
JP-02	Aomori	青森県	Tōhoku	10		8	22	8
JP-12	Chiba	千葉県	Kantō	37	6	6	16	1
JP-38	Ehime	愛媛県	Shikoku	11		7	9	
JP-18	Fukui	福井県	Chūbu	9		7	17	
JP-40	Fukuoka	福岡県	Kyushu	28	14	12	30	2
JP-07	Fukushima	福島県	Tōhoku	13		13	31	15
JP-21	Gifu	岐阜県	Chūbu	21		9	19	2
JP-10	Gunma	群馬県	Kantō	12		7	15	8
JP-34	Hiroshima	広島県	Chūgoku	14	8	5	9	
JP-01	Hokkaidō	北海道	Hokkaido	35	10	66	129	15
JP-28	Hyōgo	兵庫県	Kansai	29	9	8	12	
JP-08	Ibaraki	茨城県	Kantō	32		7	10	2
JP-17	Ishikawa	石川県	Chūbu	11		5	8	
JP-03	Iwate	岩手県	Tōhoku	14		10	15	4
JP-37	Kagawa	香川県	Shikoku	8		5	9	
JP-46	Kagoshima	鹿児島県	Kyushu	19		8	20	4
JP-14	Kanagawa	神奈川県	Kantō	19	28	6	13	1
JP-39	Kōchi	高知県	Shikoku	11		6	17	6
JP-43	Kumamoto	熊本県	Kyushu	14	5	9	23	8
JP-26	Kyōto	京都府	Kansai	15	11	6	10	1
JP-24	Mie	三重県	Kansai	14		7	15	
JP-04	Miyagi	宮城県	Tōhoku	13	5	10	21	1
JP-45	Miyazaki	宮崎県	Kyushu	9		6	14	3
JP-20	Nagano	長野県	Chūbu	19		14	23	35
JP-42	Nagasaki	長崎県	Kyushu	13		4	8	
JP-29	Nara	奈良県	Kansai	12		7	15	12
JP-15	Niigata	新潟県	Chūbu	20	8	9	6	4
JP-44	Ōita	大分県	Kyushu	14		3	3	1
JP-33	Okayama	岡山県	Chūgoku	15	4	10	10	2
JP-47	Okinawa	沖縄県	Kyushu	11		5	11	19
JP-27	Ōsaka	大阪府	Kansai	33	31	5	9	1
JP-41	Saga	佐賀県	Kyushu	10		6	10	
JP-11	Saitama	埼玉県	Kantō	40	10	8	22	1
JP-25	Shiga	滋賀県	Kansai	13		3	6	
JP-32	Shimane	島根県	Chūgoku	8		5	10	1
JP-22	Shizuoka	静岡県	Chūbu	23	6	5	12	
JP-09	Tochigi	栃木県	Kantō	14		5	12	
JP-36	Tokushima	徳島県	Shikoku	8		8	15	1
JP-13	Tōkyō	東京都	Kantō	26 (23)		1	5	8
JP-31	Tottori	鳥取県	Chūgoku	4		5	14	1
JP-16	Toyama	富山県	Chūbu	10		2	4	1
JP-30	Wakayama	和歌山県	Kansai	9		6	20	1
JP-06	Yamagata	山形県	Tōhoku	13		8	19	3
JP-35	Yamaguchi	山口県	Chūgoku	13		4	6	
JP-19	Yamanashi	山梨県	Chūbu	13		5	8	6
Total				792 (23)	175	307	743	183

== See also ==
- Decentralisation in Japan
