= Local Autonomy Act =

Japanese law passed in 1947

The Local Autonomy Act (地方自治法, Chihō-jichi-hō), passed by the House of Representatives and the House of Peers on March 28, 1947 and promulgated as Law No. 67 of 1947 on April 17, is an Act of devolution that established most of Japan's contemporary local government structures and administrative divisions, including prefectures, municipalities and other entities. On July 16, 1999, the law was amended to eliminate administrative functions imposed upon local governments by the central governments and to establish Committee for Settling National-Local Disputes. The law and other relevant laws have been amended after the revision to promote decentralization.

== Local public entities ==
The classification of local public entities (地方公共団体, chihō kōkyō dantai) (LPEs) are:

- Ordinary LPEs
  - Prefectures (to, dō, fu and ken)
  - Municipalities
    - Cities
    - Towns
    - Villages
- Special LPEs (incomplete)
  - Special wards of Tokyo
  - Unions of LPEs
    - Partial operating unions
    - Full operating unions
    - Office operating unions
    - Regional unions
  - Property districts
  - Regional development enterprises

Ordinary LPEs are the basic local governments. The distinction between ordinary and special LPEs is primarily relevant under the Constitution of Japan, which grants ordinary LPEs particular rights, including:

- Direct elections (Article 93.2)
- The right to legislate (Article 94)
- Citizen referendum prior to enactment of any statute which specifically affects the LPE (Article 95)

Special LPEs do not have these authorities except as otherwise provided by statute. While special wards are regarded as basic local governments within Tokyo, other special LPEs are consortia of LPEs for specific fields such as schools, waterworks and waste management.

LPEs are self-governing in many respects, but report indirectly to the Ministry of Internal Affairs and Communications in Tokyo, which monitors relations between LPEs, as well as relations between LPEs and the government. The Ministry generally approves all inter-prefectural special LPEs, while inter-municipal special LPEs are approved by prefectural governors.

== Revision ==
The Local Autonomy Act (paragraph 5 of Article 2) was revised in 1969 that required local governments to produce a forward-looking Basic Plan (kihon keikaku) for their long-term economic and social development, to cover a duration of around 25 years. It has to be approved by the elected local council as part of a comprehensive planning that tied to the local fiscal decision. Takegawa notes that in 1970, less than 10% of local governments had made comprehensive plans, by 1975 the number had gone up to 75%, and in 1980 it was almost 90%.

In January 2011, the Ministry of Internal Affairs and Communications announced plans to revise the law to enable the national government to investigate the laws of the LPEs for extralegality and place lawsuits against them if they fail to correct their actions.

== See also ==
- City designated by government ordinance
- Decentralisation in Japan
