= Fujioka Station (Shizuoka) =

Railway station in Gotemba, Shizuoka Prefecture, Japan

CB12 Fujioka Station 富士岡駅
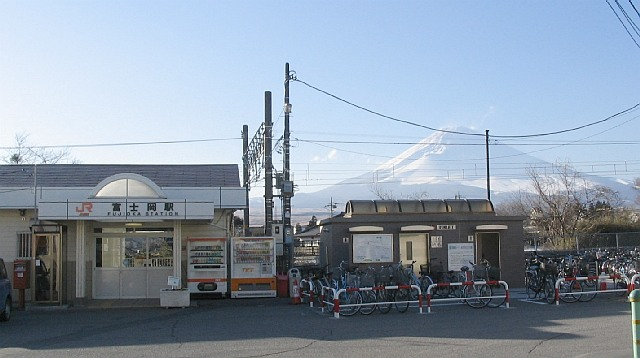
- Fujioka station building

General information
- Location: Nakayama, Gotemba-shi, Shizuoka-ken; Japan
- Coordinates: 35°15′21.62″N 138°55′12.83″E
- Operator: JR Central
- Line: Gotemba Line
- Distance: 40.6 kilometers from Kōzu
- Platforms: 1 island platform

Other information
- Status: Staffed ("Midori no Madoguchi")
- Station code: CB12

History
- Opened: August 1, 1944

Passengers
- FY2017: 1071 daily

Services
Preceding station	JR Central	Following station
Iwanami CB13 towards Numazu	Gotemba Line	Minami-Gotemba CB11 towards Kōzu
Location
- Location within Shizuoka Prefecture Location within Japan

Fujioka Station (富士岡駅, Fujioka-eki) is a railway station in the city of Gotemba, Shizuoka Prefecture, Japan, operated by the Central Japan Railway Company (JR Central).

== Lines ==
Fujioka Station is served by the JR Central Gotemba Line, and is located 40.6 kilometers from the official starting point of the line at Kōzu.

== Station layout ==
Fujioka Station has a single island platform. The station was originally located on a switchback, which was eliminated when the line was electrified in 1968, and the platform realigned; a vestigial remnant of the former switchback is retained as a side track to the north of the station. The original side platform was rebuilt as an island platform in 1989. The station building has automated ticket machines, TOICA automated turnstiles and a "Midori no Madoguchi" ticket office, and is staffed only during daytime hours. It is connected to the platform with a footbridge.

=== Platforms ===
1	■ Gotemba Line	for Gotemba, Yamakita, Matsuda, and Kōzu
2	■ Gotemba Line	for Numazu

== History ==
Fujioka Station opened on 1 August 1944, to provide access to the Fujioka Heavy Artillery School (陸軍重胞兵学校, Fujioka Jyūhōhei-gakkō) of the Imperial Japanese Army, and usage was restricted only to military personnel. The station was opened to civilian passengers from 11 November 1944. Along with its division and privatization of JNR on 1 April 1987, the station came under the control and operation of JR Central.

Station numbering was introduced to the Gotemba Line in March 2018; Fujioka Station was assigned station number CB12.

== Passenger statistics ==
In fiscal 2017, the station was used by an average of 1071 passengers daily (boarding passengers only).

== Surrounding area ==
- Fujioka Elementary School
- Fujioka Junior High School

== See also ==
- List of railway stations in Japan
