= Yamakita Station =

Railway station in Yamakita, Kanagawa Prefecture, Japan

CB06 Yamakita Station 山北駅
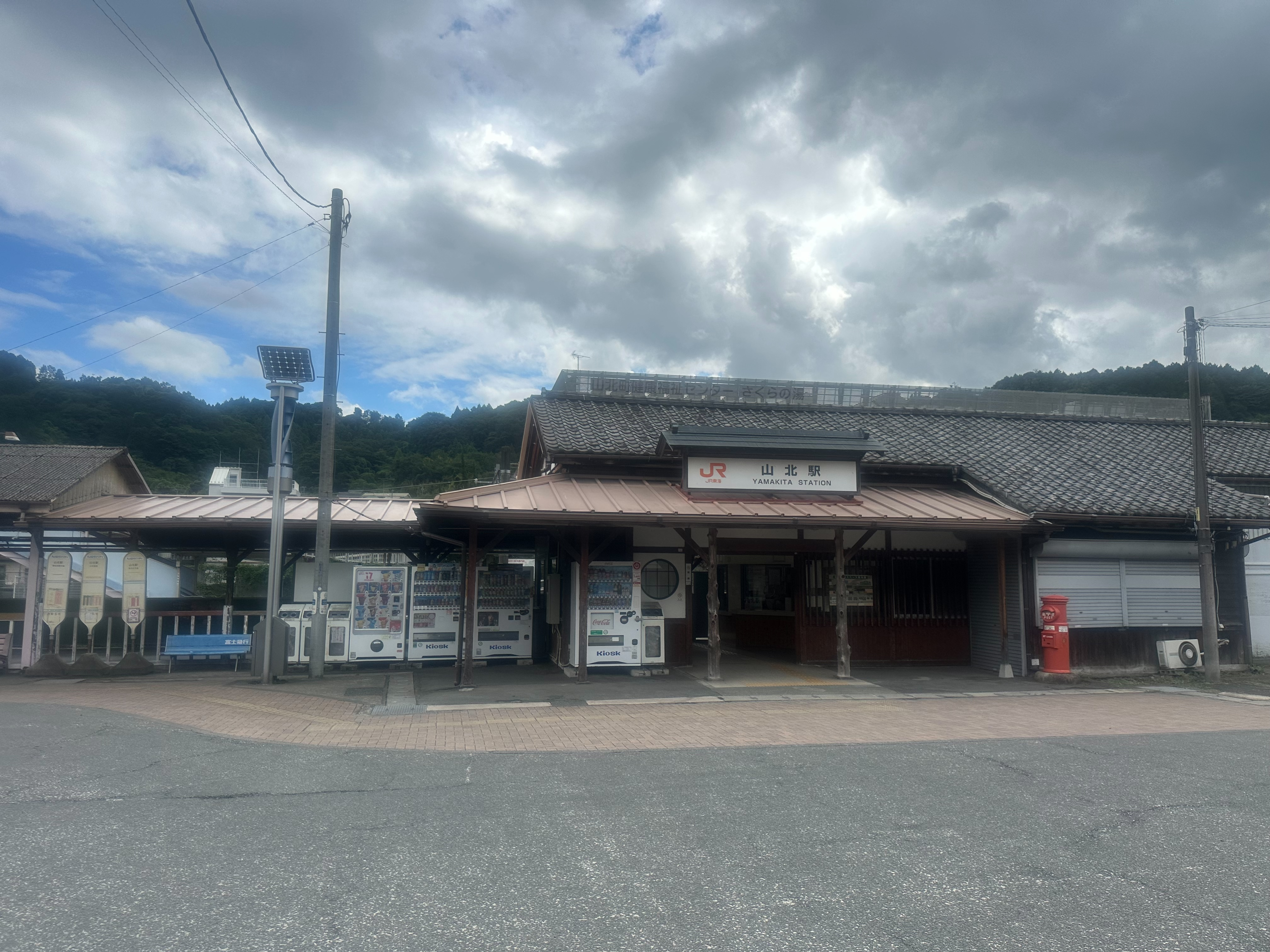
- Yamakita Station forecourt, August 2024

General information
- Location: Yamakita, Yamakita Town, Ashigarakami District, Kanagawa Prefecture 258-0113; Japan
- Coordinates: 35°21′38.63″N 139°4′47.86″E
- Operator: JR Central
- Line: Gotemba Line
- Distance: 15.9 km (9.9 mi) from Kōzu
- Platforms: 1 island platform
- Tracks: 2
- Connections: Bus terminal

Construction
- Structure type: Ground level

Other information
- Status: Staffed
- Station code: CB06
- Website: http://gotembasen.net/eki/山北

History
- Opened: 1 February 1889; 137 years ago

Passengers
- FY2019: 561 daily

Services
| Preceding station | JR Central | Following station |
|---|---|---|
| Yaga CB07 towards Numazu | Gotemba Line | Higashi-Yamakita CB05 towards Kōzu |
Location
- Location within Kanagawa Prefecture Location within Kanto Area Location within Japan

Yamakita Station (山北駅, Yamakita-eki) is a passenger railway station located in south-east Yamakita, Kanagawa, Japan, operated by Central Japan Railway Company (JR Central).

== Lines ==
Yamakita Station is served by the Gotemba Line and is 15.9 kilometers from the terminus of the line at Kōzu Station.

== Station layout ==
Yamakita Station was built with two island platforms, but now has only a single island platform. A set of tracks outside the southern track is used for parking trains at night, when not in use. The station is staffed during daylight hours. A JNR Class D52 steam locomotive is preserved in a park near the station.

=== Platforms ===
| 1 | ■ Gotemba Line | for Matsuda and Kōzu |
| 2 | ■ Gotemba Line | for Gotemba, Susono, and Numazu |

== History ==
Yamakita Station opened on February 1, 1889 on the Japanese National Railways (JNR) line linking Kōzu Station and Shizuoka Station. The steep gradient of the line in this area necessitated the use of bank engines, and Yamakita Station developed as a center for the maintenance and refueling of these engines. It was designated a station of the Tōkaidō Main Line on November 12, 1909. However, with the opening of the Tanna Tunnel and the development of more powerful steam locomotives, Yamakita Station gradually decreased in importance. It was designated a station on the Gotemba Line from December 1, 1934. The Yamakita Locomotive Depot was abolished on May 15, 1943. Freight services were discontinued on March 31, 1979 and small parcel services from February 1, 1984. On April 1, 1987 along with privatization and division of JNR, the station came under control of JR Central.

Station numbering was introduced to the Gotemba Line in March 2018; Yamakita Station was assigned station number CB06.

== Passenger statistics ==
In fiscal 2018, the station was used by an average of 561 passengers daily (boarding passengers only).

The passenger figures (boarding passengers only) for previous years are as shown below.

| Fiscal year | daily average |
|---|---|
| 2005 | 821 |
| 2010 | 740 |
| 2015 | 618 |

== Bus services ==
- Fujikyu Shonan Bus
  - for Nishi Tanzawa via Lake Tanzawa and Nakagawa Onsen
  - for Shin-Matsuda Station (Odakyu Odawara Line) via Yamakita Station (JR Central)

== Surrounding area ==
- Lake Tanzawa
- Shasui Falls
- Yamakita Railway Park
- Yamakita Town Hall
- Yamakita Town Central Public Hall

== Bus services ==
- Fujikyu Shonan Bus
  - for Nishi Tanzawa via Yaga Station, Lake Tanzawa and Nakagawa Onsen
  - for Shin-Matsuda Station (Odakyu Odawara Line)

== See also ==
- List of railway stations in Japan
