= Suruga-Oyama Station =

Railway station in Oyama, Shizuoka Prefecture, Japan

CB08 Suruga-Oyama Station 駿河小山駅
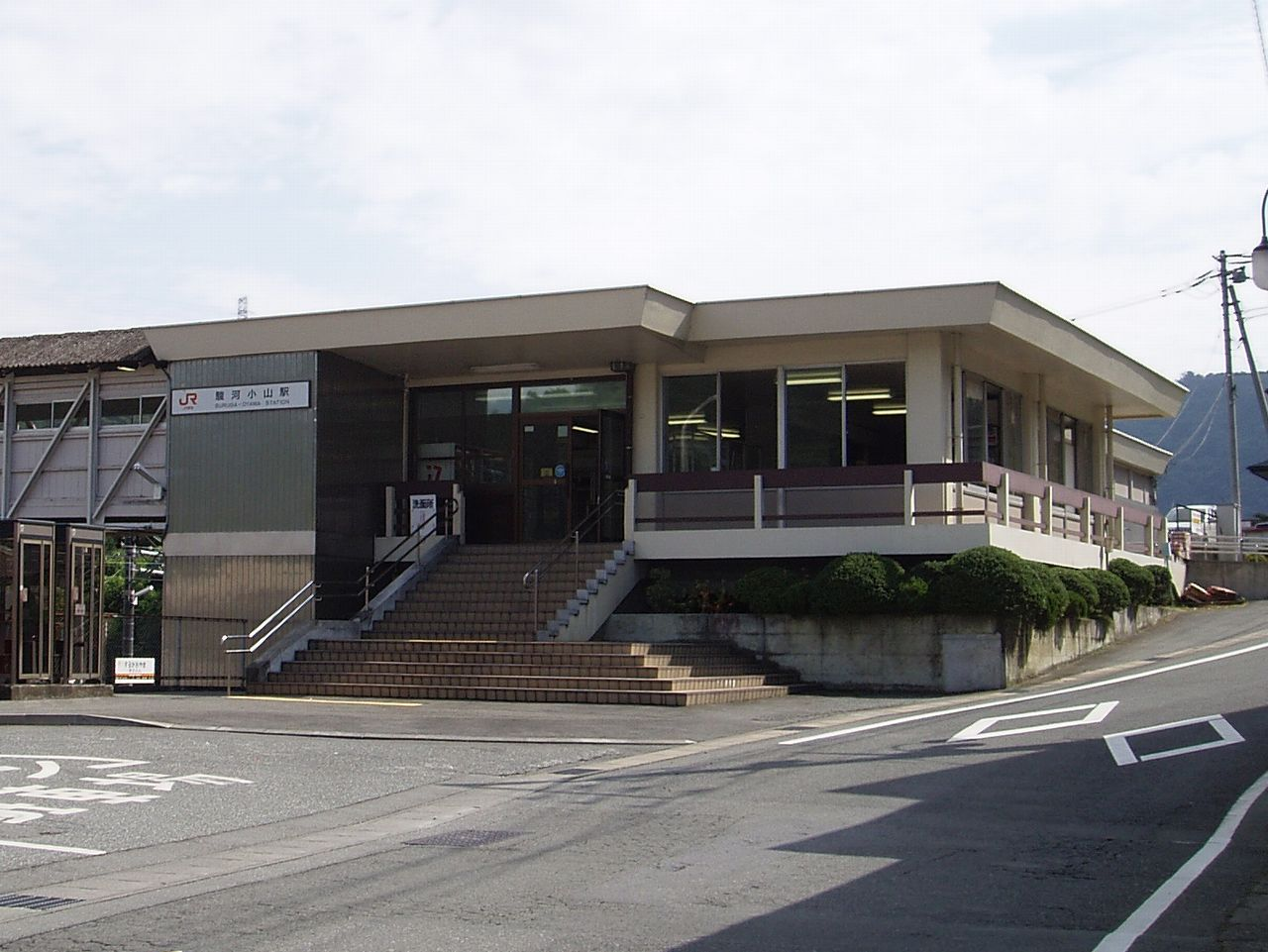
- Suruga-Oyama Station in July 2008

General information
- Location: Oyama, Oyama Town, Suntō District, Shizuoka Prefecture; Japan
- Coordinates: 35.358717°N 138.998722°E
- Operator: JR Central
- Line: Gotemba Line
- Distance: 24.6 km (15.3 mi) from Kōzu
- Platforms: 1 island platform
- Tracks: 2

Construction
- Structure type: At grade

Other information
- Status: Unstaffed
- Station code: CB08

History
- Opened: 1 February 1889; 137 years ago
- Former names: Oyama (to 1912); Suruga (to 1952)

Passengers
- FY2017: 393 daily

Services
Preceding station	JR Central	Following station
Ashigara CB09 towards Numazu	Gotemba Line	Yaga CB07 towards Kōzu
Gotemba CB10 Terminus	Romancecar	Matsuda CB04 towards Shinjuku or Kita-Senju
Location
- Location within Shizuoka Prefecture Location within Central Japan Location within Japan

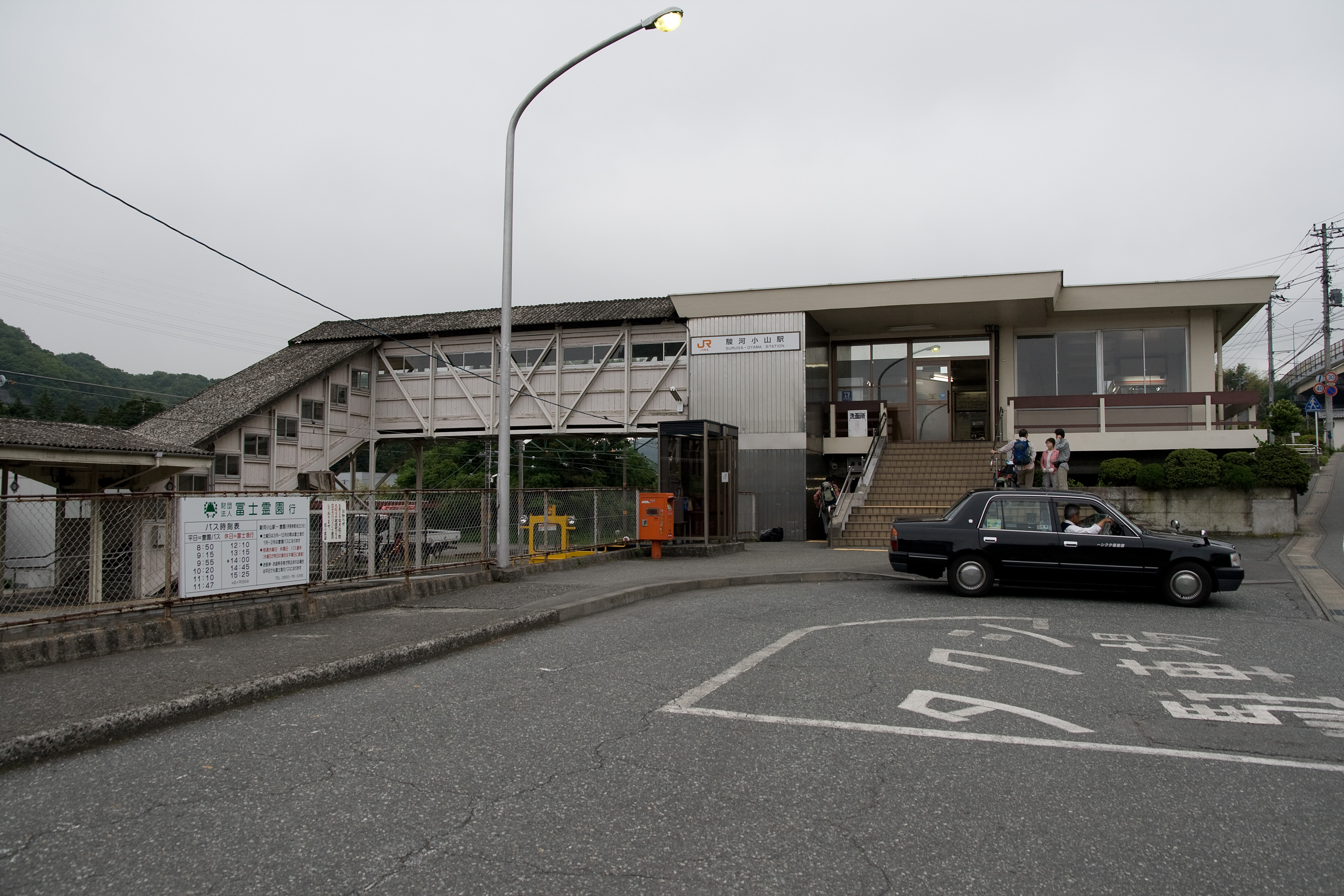
Suruga-Oyama Station

Suruga-Oyama Station (駿河小山駅, Suruga-Oyama-eki) is a railway station on the Gotemba Line in the western part of the town of Oyama, Shizuoka, Japan, operated by Central Japan Railway Company (JR Central).

== Lines ==
Suruga-Oyama Station is served by the Gotemba Line, and is located 24.6 kilometers from the official starting point of the line at Kōzu. In addition to regular train service, a number of the Odakyu limited express Mt. Fuji services stop at this station.

== Station layout ==
The station consists of a single island platform serving two tracks. The station building is to the south of the tracks and connected to the platform with a footbridge. This station is unstaffed.

=== Platforms ===
1	■ Gotemba Line	for Gotemba and Numazu
2	■ Gotemba Line	for Matsuda, and Kōzu

== History ==
The station initially opened on February 1, 1889, as Oyama Station (小山駅). It was renamed Suruga Station (駿河駅) on July 1, 1912. When the opening of the Tanna Tunnel diverted the route of the Tōkaidō Main Line south on December 1, 1934, Suruga Station became a station on the Gotemba Line. It was renamed Suruga-Oyama Station (the present name) on January 1, 1952. Operational control of the station was transferred to JR Central following privatization of JNR on April 1, 1987.

Suruga-Oyama Station has been unstaffed since 2012.

Station numbering was introduced to the Gotemba Line in March 2018; Suruga-Oyama Station was assigned station number CB08.

== Passenger statistics ==
In fiscal 2017, the station was used by an average of 393 passengers daily (boarding passengers only).

== Surrounding area ==
- Oyama town hall
- Oyama Junior High School

== See also ==
- List of railway stations in Japan
