= Yaga Station =

Yaga Station can refer to two different train stations in Japan:

- Yaga Station (Kanagawa) (谷峨駅) on the Gotemba Line in Yamakita, Kanagawa, Japan
- Yaga Station (Hiroshima) (矢賀駅) on the Geibi Line in Higashi-ku, Hiroshima, Japan
