= Sagami-Kaneko Station =

Railway station in Ōi, Kanagawa Prefecture, Japan

CB03 Sagami-Kaneko Station 相模金子駅
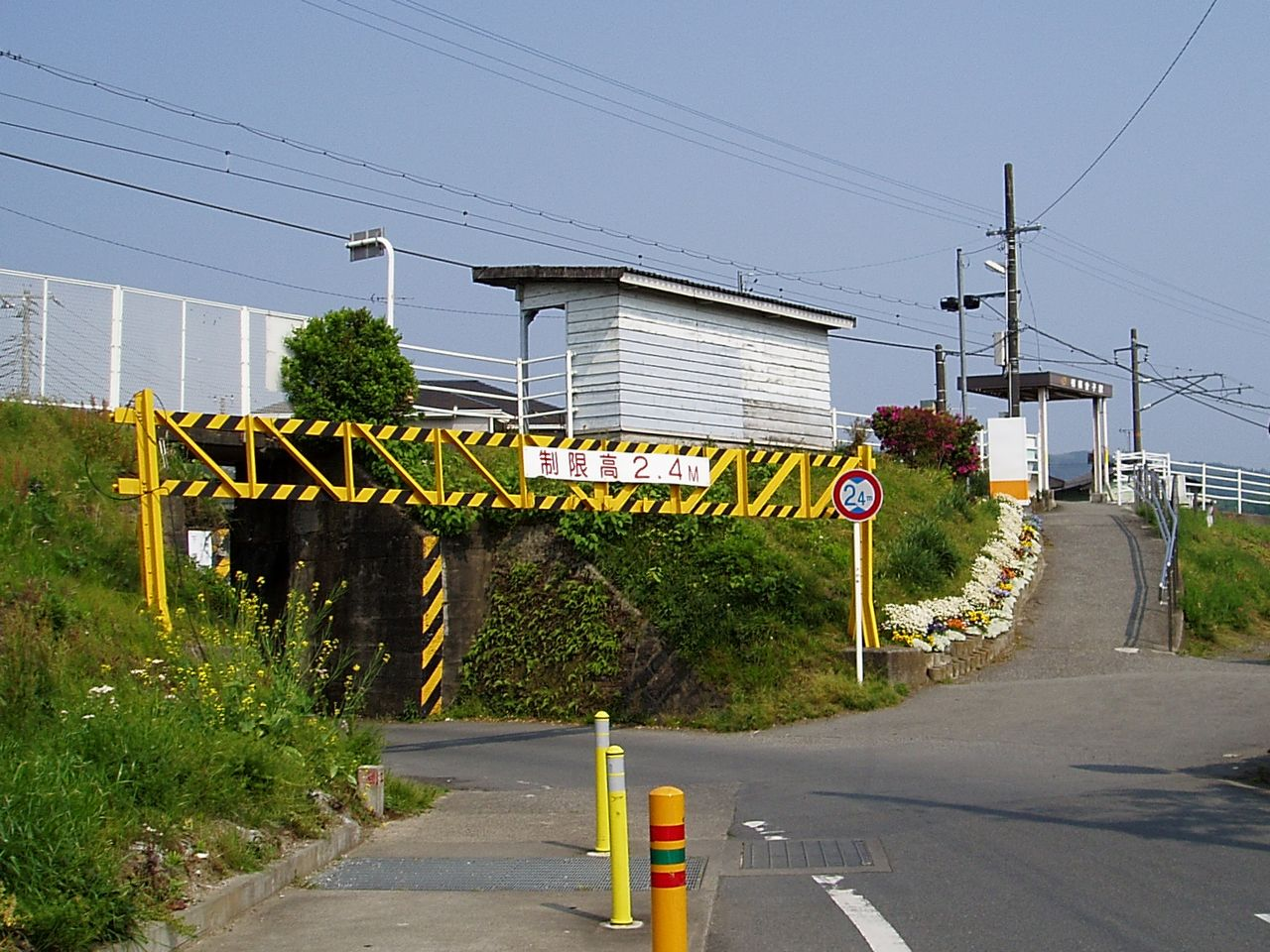
- Sagami-Kaneko Station, April 2008

General information
- Location: Kaneko, Ōi Town, Ashigarakami District, Kanagawa Prefecture 258-0019; Japan
- Coordinates: 35.334037°N 139.150265°E
- Operator: JR Central
- Line: Gotemba Line
- Distance: 8.3 km (5.2 mi) from Kōzu
- Platforms: 1 side platform
- Tracks: 1
- Connections

Construction
- Structure type: At grade

Other information
- Status: Unstaffed
- Station code: CB03
- Website: https://ja.wikipedia.org/wiki/相模金子駅

History
- Opened: 15 December 1956; 69 years ago

Passengers
- FY2018: 461 daily

Services
Preceding station	JR Central	Following station
Matsuda CB04 towards Numazu	Gotemba Line	Kami-Ōi CB02 towards Kōzu
Location
- Location within Kanagawa Prefecture Location within Kanto Area Location within Japan

Sagami-Kaneko Station (相模金子駅, Sagami-Kaneko-eki) is a passenger railway station located in the western part of the town of Ōi in Ashigarakami District, Kanagawa, Japan, operated by Central Japan Railway Company (JR Central).

== Lines ==
Sagami-Kaneko Station is served by the Gotemba Line and is 8.3 kilometers from the terminus of the line at Kōzu Station.

== Station layout ==
Sagami-Kaneko Station has a single side platform. The station is unattended. There is no station building, but only a waiting room built on the platform.

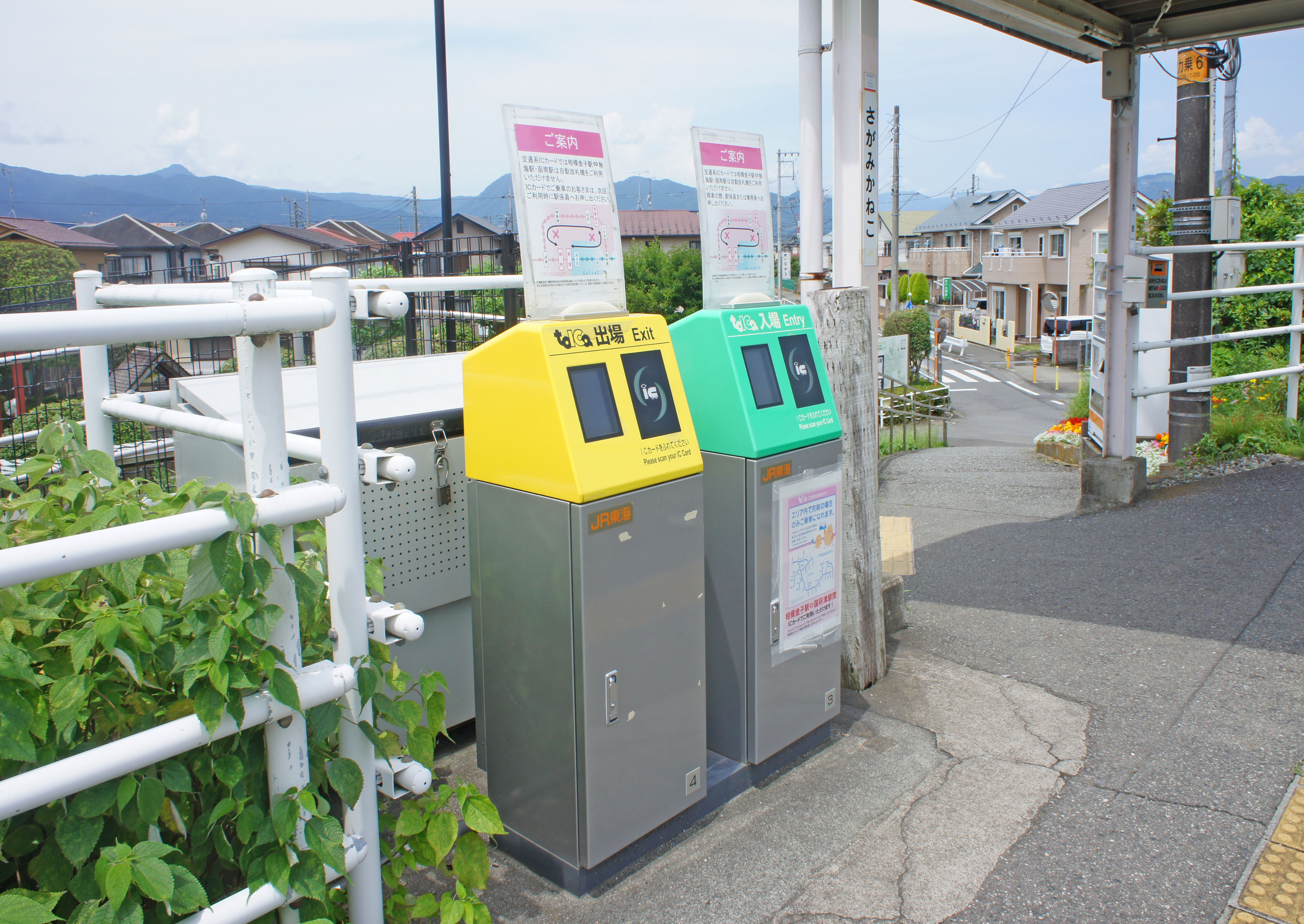
Simple TOICA ticket gate (April 2022)

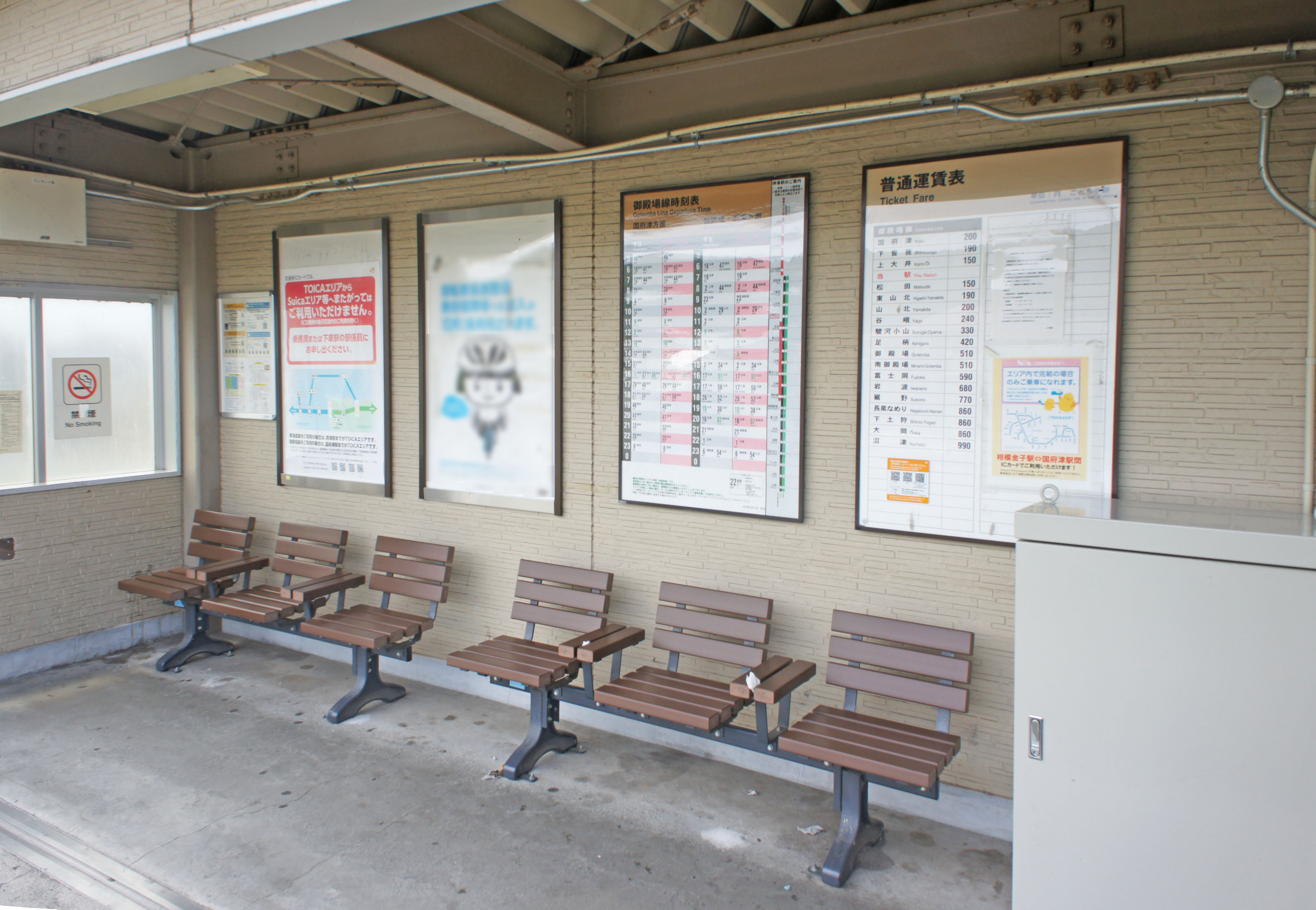
Waiting room (April 2022)

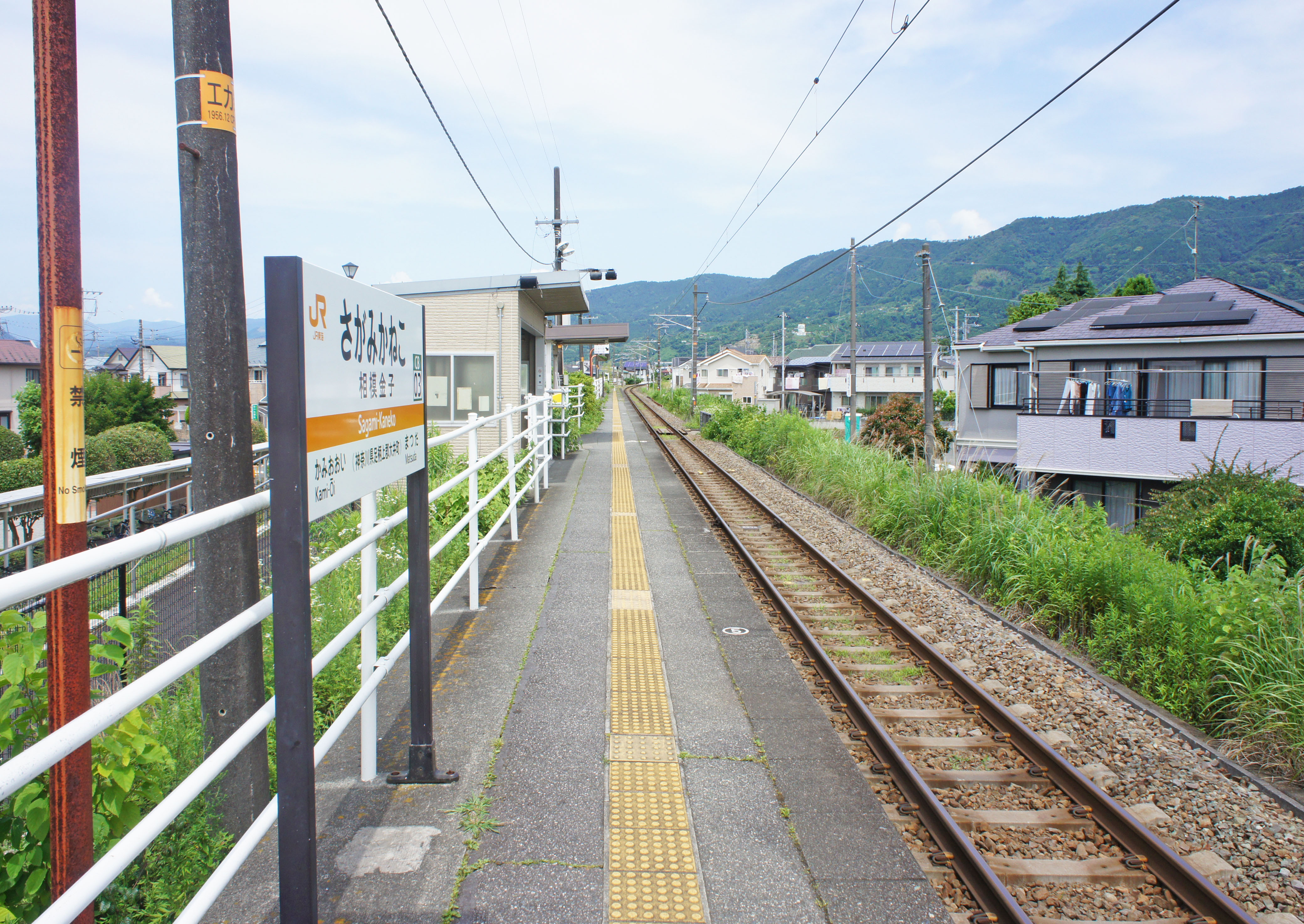
Platform (April 2022)

== History ==
Sagami-Kaneko Station opened on December 15, 1956. On April 1, 1987 along with privatization and division of JNR, the station came under control of JR Central.

Station numbering was introduced to the Gotemba Line in March 2018; Sagami-Kaneko Station was assigned station number CB03.

== Passenger statistics ==
In fiscal 2018, the station was used by an average of 461 passengers daily (boarding passengers only).

The passenger figures (boarding passengers only) for previous years are as shown below.

Fiscal year	daily average
2005	455
2010	450
2015	433

== Surrounding area ==
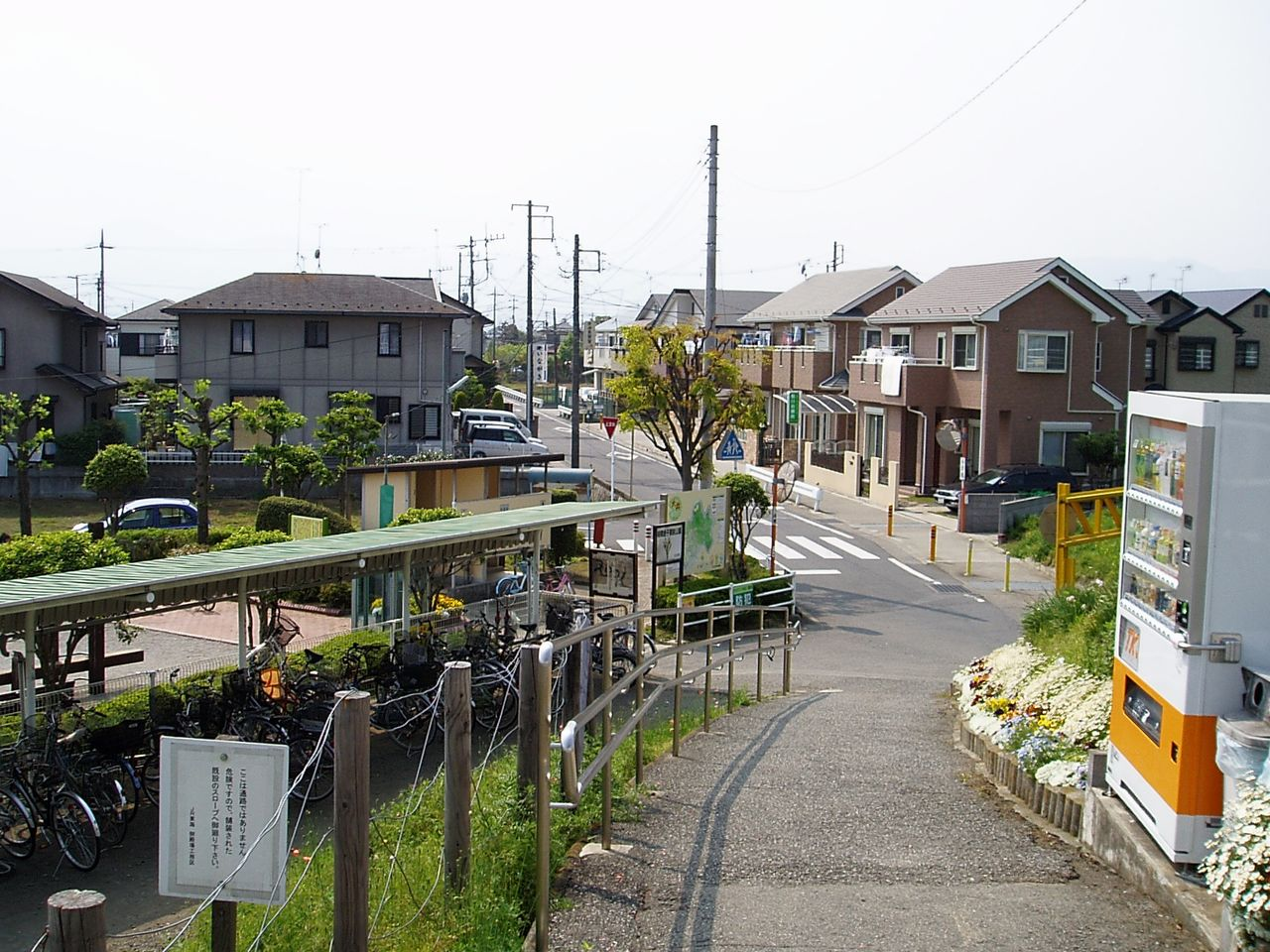
Front of Sagami-kaneko station

- Saimyō Temple (西明寺)
- Tomei Expressway Ōi-Matsuda Interchange
- Ōi-Kaneko Post Office

== See also ==
- List of railway stations in Japan
