= Miho Dam =

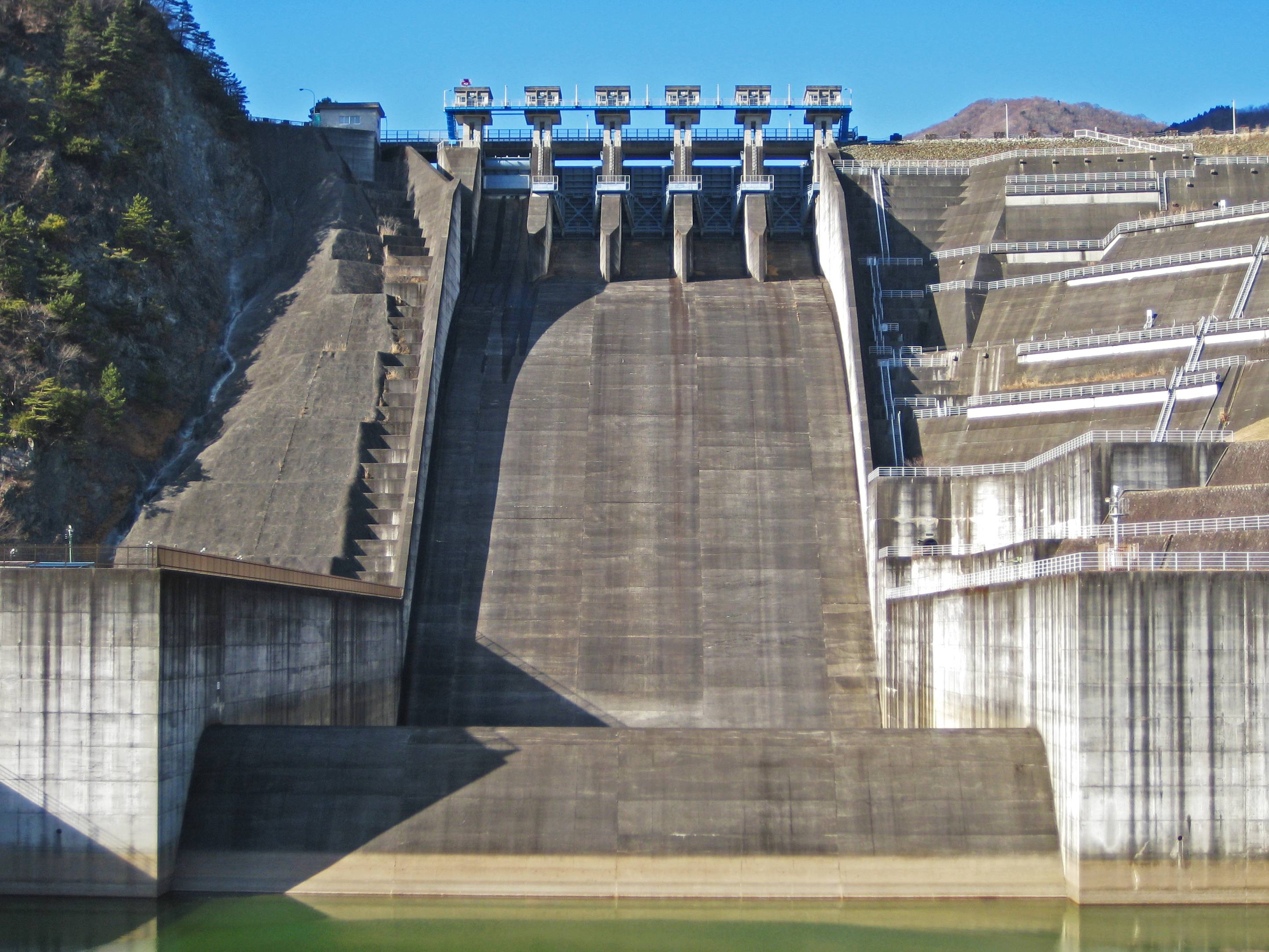
- Official name: 三保ダム
- Location: Kanagawa Prefecture, Japan
- Coordinates: 35°24′37″N 139°02′30″E
- Construction began: 1969
- Opening date: 1978
- Operator(s): Kanagawa Prefecture

Dam and spillways
- Type of dam: Embankment
- Impounds: Kawauchi River
- Height: 95 m (312 ft)
- Length: 587.7 m (1,928 ft)

Reservoir
- Creates: Lake Tanzawa
- Total capacity: 64,900,000 m^{3} (2.29×10^{9} cu ft)
- Catchment area: 158.5 km^{2} (61.2 sq mi)
- Surface area: 218 hectares

The Miho Dam (三保ダム, Miho damu) is a multi-purpose dam on the Kawauchi River, a tributary stream of the Sakawa River in the town of Yamakita, Ashigarakami District, Kanagawa Prefecture on the island of Honshū, Japan. The dam is located within the borders of the Tanzawa-Ōyama Quasi-National Park.

== History ==
Development of the Sakawa River began in the 1960s, as a public works project to promote the local economies of towns in western Kanagawa prefecture. Justification was provided by the projected growth in population of Odawara with the completion of the Tōkaidō Main Line railway and Tōmei Expressway and the continuing growth in demand from the Kawasaki-Yokohama industrial area for drinking and industrial water.

Work on the Miho Dam began in 1969 by the Kumagai Gumi construction company; and was completed in 1978. Construction involved the relocation of 233 households from the area scheduled to be flooded by the dam. Part of the relocation agreement included a promise to retain historic local place names, which resulted in the name of the dam being changed from the planned "Sakawa Dam" to "Miho Dam" in reflection of the local district name.

== Design ==
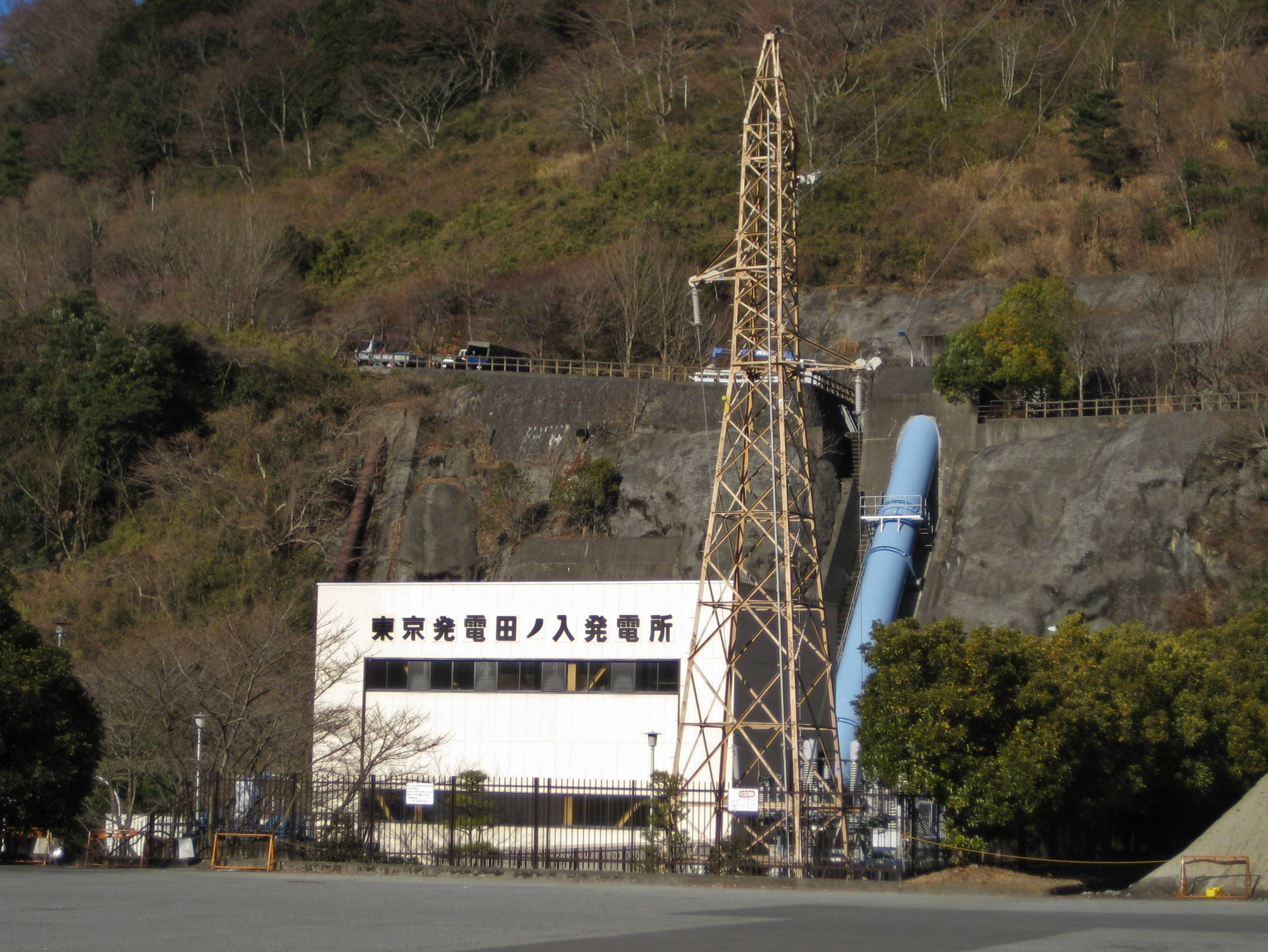
Tanoiri Hydroelectric Power Station

The Miho Dam a rock-fill dam, with an initial design height of 100 meters, which was later lowered to 95 meters. Unusual for a rock-fill dam, the center portion of the dam is made of concrete and incorporates five spillways. The associated Tanoiri Hydroelectric Power Plant has a rated capacity of 7,400 KW of power. The reservoir created by the dam, Lake Tanzawa is also a major recreational location for Kanagawa Prefecture.

== See also ==
- Lake Tanzawa
