= Minami-Gotemba Station =

Railway station in Gotemba, Shizuoka Prefecture, Japan

CB11 Minami-Gotemba Station 南御殿場駅
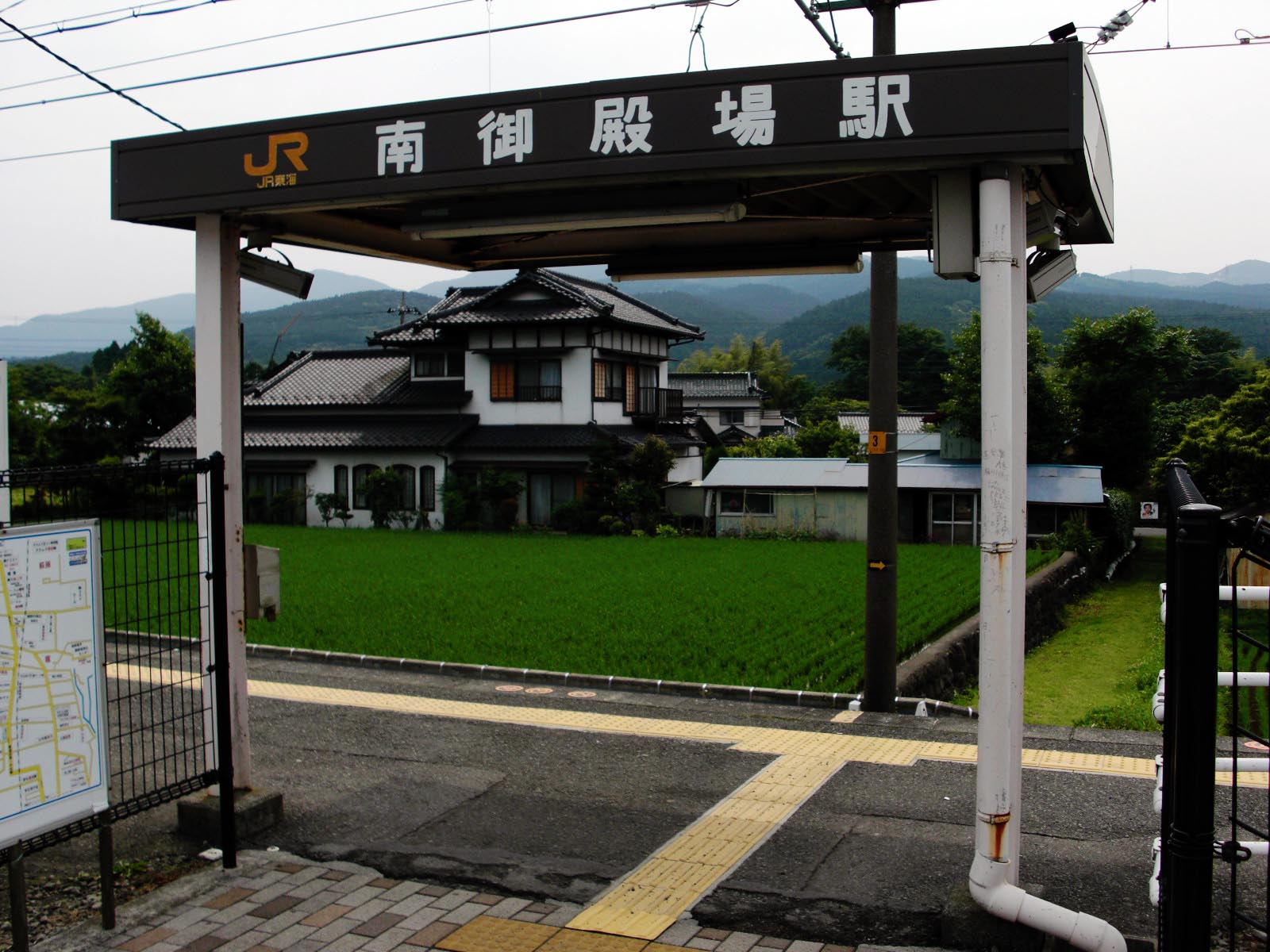
- The station entrance

General information
- Location: Kamado, Gotemba City, Shizuoka Prefecture; Japan
- Coordinates: 35°16′37.75″N 138°55′32.00″E
- Operator: JR Central
- Line: Gotemba Line
- Distance: 38.2 km (23.7 mi) from Kōzu
- Platforms: 1 side platform
- Tracks: 1

Construction
- Structure type: At grade

Other information
- Status: Unstaffed
- Station code: CB11

History
- Opened: 20 July 1962; 64 years ago

Passengers
- FY2017: 311 daily

Services
Preceding station	JR Central	Following station
Fujioka CB12 towards Numazu	Gotemba Line	Gotemba CB10 towards Kōzu
Location
- Location within Shizuoka Prefecture Location within Central Japan Location within Japan

Minami-Gotemba Station (南御殿場駅, Minami-Gotemba-eki) is a railway station in the city of Gotemba, Shizuoka Prefecture, Japan, operated by the Central Japan Railway Company (JR Central).

== Lines ==
Minami-Gotemba Station is served by the JR Central Gotemba Line, and is located 38.2 kilometers from the official starting point of the line at Kōzu.

== Station layout ==
Minami-Gotemba Station has one side platform serving a single bi-directional track. The station is unattended.

== History ==
Minami-Gotemba Station opened on July 20, 1962. Operational control of the station was transferred to JR Central following privatization of Japanese National Railways (JNR) on April 1, 1987.

Station numbering was introduced to the Gotemba Line in March 2018; Minami-Gotemba Station was assigned station number CB11.

== Passenger statistics ==
In fiscal 2017, the station was used by an average of 311 passengers daily (boarding passengers only).

== Surrounding area ==
- L'Oréal Japan factory

== See also ==
- List of railway stations in Japan
