= Higashi-Yamakita Station =

Railway station in Yamakita, Kanagawa Prefecture, Japan

CB05 Higashi-Yamakita Station 東山北駅
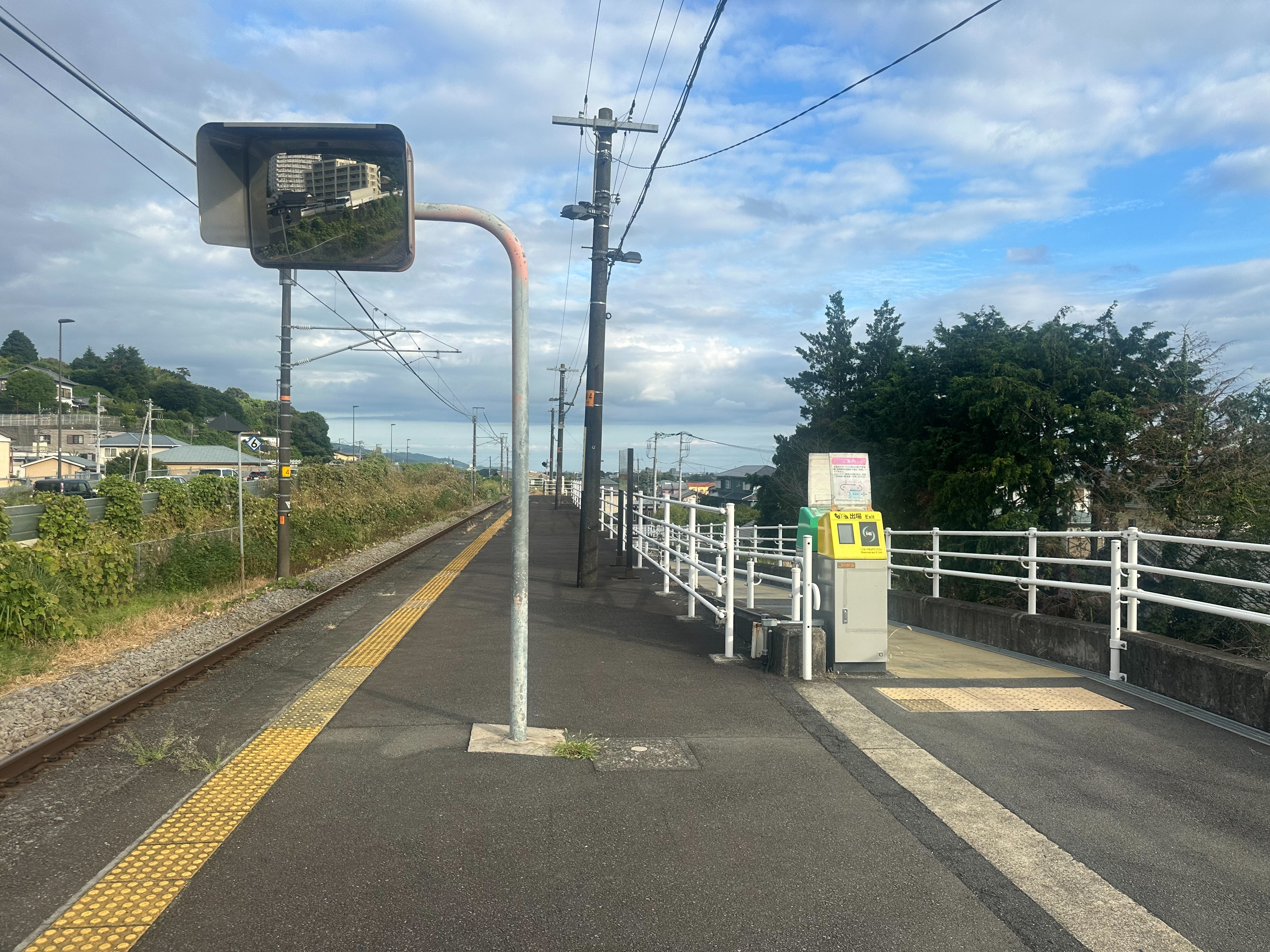
- Platform, 2024

General information
- Location: Mukōhara, Yamakita Town, Ashigarakami District, Kanagawa Prefecture 258-0111; Japan
- Coordinates: 35°21′25.75″N 139°6′29.64″E
- Operator: JR Central
- Line: Gotemba Line
- Distance: 13.1 km (8.1 mi) from Kōzu
- Platforms: 1 side platform
- Tracks: 1
- Connections: Bus stop

Construction
- Structure type: At grade

Other information
- Status: Unstaffed
- Station code: CB05
- Website: https://ja.wikipedia.org/wiki/東山北駅

History
- Opened: 25 December 1956; 69 years ago

Passengers
- FY2019: 793 daily

Services
Preceding station	JR Central	Following station
Yamakita CB06 towards Numazu	Gotemba Line	Matsuda CB04 towards Kōzu
Location
- Location within Kanagawa Prefecture Location within Japan

Higashi-Yamakita Station (東山北駅, Higashi-Yamakita-eki) is a passenger railway station located in the town of Yamakita, Kanagawa, Japan, operated by Central Japan Railway Company (JR Central).

== Lines ==
Higashi-Yamakita Station is served by the Gotemba Line and is 13.1 kilometers from the terminus of the line at Kōzu Station.

== Station layout ==
Higashi-Yamakita Station has a single side platform serving bidirectional traffic. The station is unattended.

== History ==
Higashi-Yamakita Station opened on December 25, 1956 as a station of Japanese National Railways (JNR) Gotemba Line. On April 1, 1987 along with privatization and division of JNR, the station came under control of JR Central.

Station numbering was introduced to the Gotemba Line in March 2018; Higashi-Yamakita Station was assigned station number CB05.

== Passenger statistics ==
In fiscal 2018, the station was used by an average of 793 passengers daily (boarding passengers only).

The passenger figures (boarding passengers only) for previous years are as shown below.

Fiscal year	daily average
2005	956
2010	895
2015	807

== Surrounding area ==
- Kanagawa Prefectural Yamakita High School

== See also ==
- List of railway stations in Japan
