= Ōoka Station =

Railway station in Numazu, Shizuoka Prefecture, Japan

CB17 Ōoka Station 大岡駅
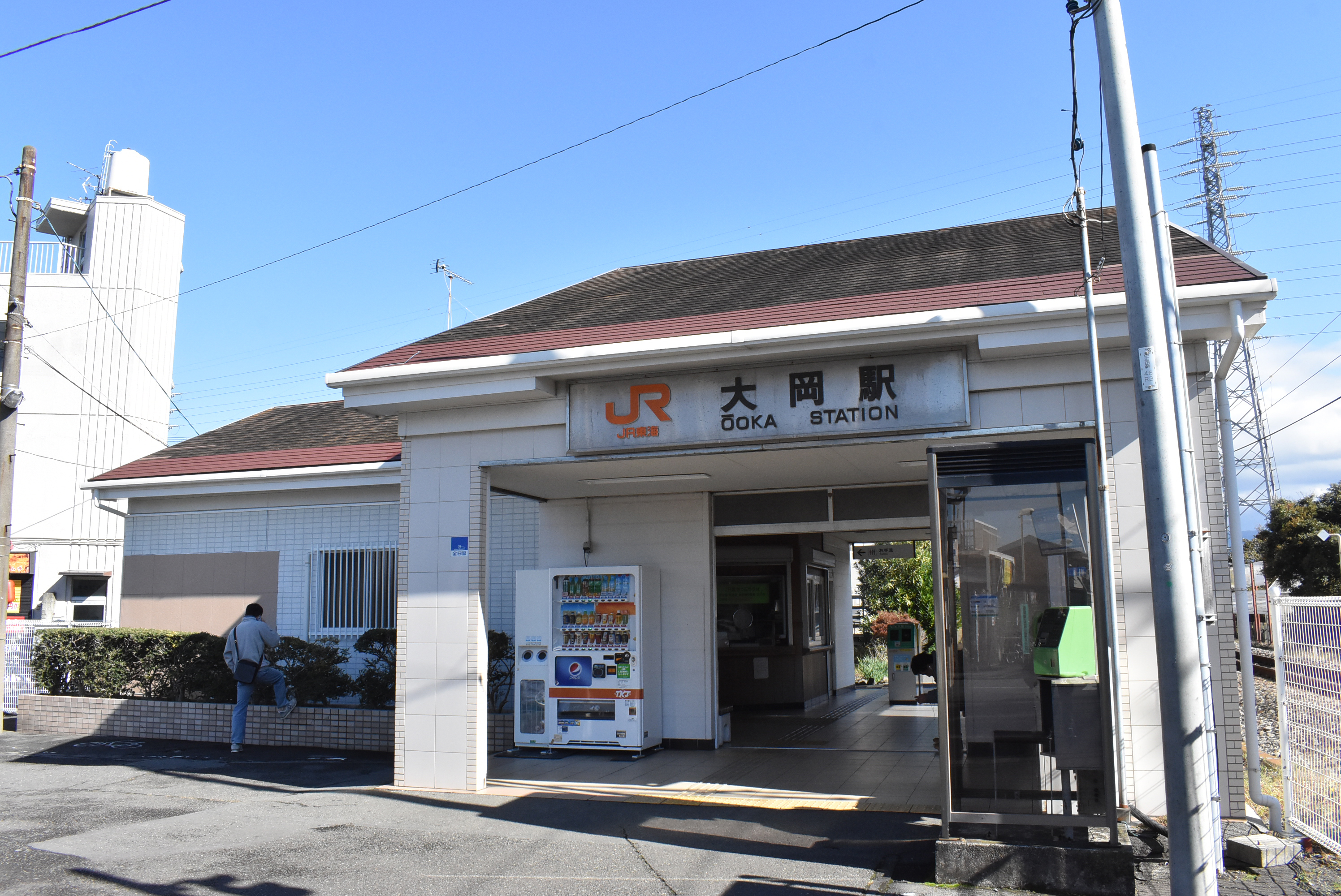
- Entrance to Ōoka Station in November 2017

General information
- Location: 2477 Ōoka, Numazu-shi, Shizuoka-ken; Japan
- Coordinates: 35°6′57″N 138°52′51″E
- Operator: JR Central
- Line: Gotemba Line
- Distance: 57.8 kilometers from Kōzu
- Platforms: 1 side platform

Other information
- Status: Staffed
- Station code: CB17

History
- Opened: January 15, 1946

Passengers
- FY2017: 1277 daily

Services
Preceding station	JR Central	Following station
Numazu CB18 Terminus	Gotemba Line	Shimo-Togari CB16 towards Kōzu
Location
- Location within Shizuoka Prefecture Location within Japan

Ōoka Station (大岡駅, Ōoka-eki) is a railway station in the city of Numazu, Shizuoka Prefecture, Japan, operated by the Central Japan Railway Company (JR Central).

== Lines ==
Ōoka Station is served by the Gotemba Line, and is located 57.8 kilometers from the official starting point of the line at Kōzu.

== Station layout ==
The station has one side platform serving a single bi-directional track. The station building has automated ticket machines, TOICA automated turnstiles and is staffed.

== History ==
Ōoka Station began as an unnamed rail siding constructed during the Pacific War to serve the numerous munitions plants located Ōoka district of Numazu. After the end of World War II, it was officially opened as a civilian train station on January 15, 1946. Regularly scheduled freight operations were suspended from 1971. Along with privatization and division of JNR, JR Central started operating the station on April 1, 1987.

Station numbering was introduced to the Gotemba Line in March 2018; Shimo-Togari Station was assigned station number CB17.

== Passenger statistics ==
In fiscal 2017, the station was used by an average of 1277 passengers daily (boarding passengers only).

== Surrounding area ==
- Toshiba Numazu plant
- Numazu Kita High School
- Numazu Higashi High School

== See also ==
- List of railway stations in Japan
