= Yaga Station (Kanagawa) =

Railway station in Yamakita, Kanagawa Prefecture, Japan

CB07 Yaga Station 谷峨駅
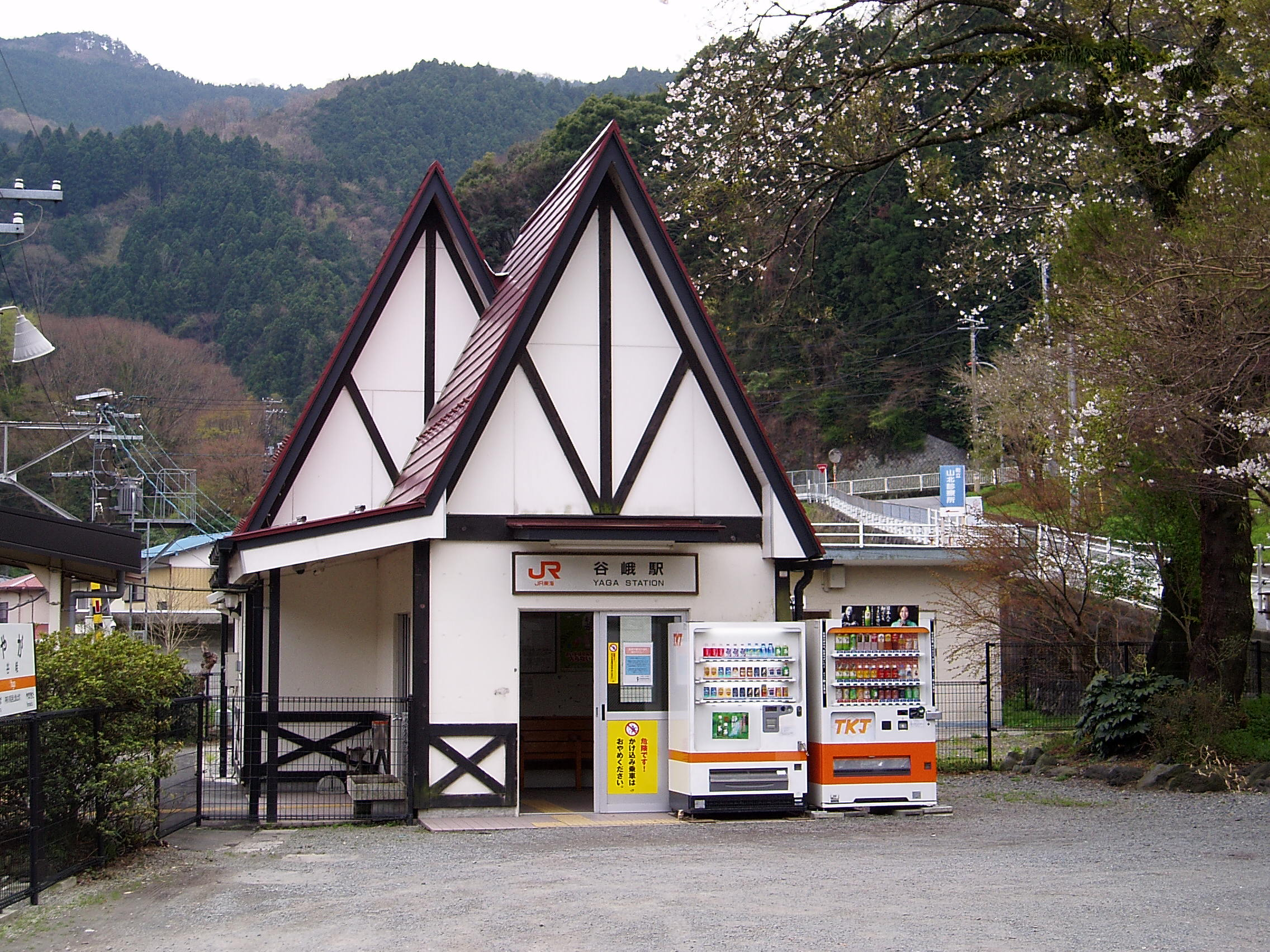
- Yaga Station, April 2007

General information
- Location: Yaga, Yamakita Town, Ashigarakami District, Kanagawa Prefecture 258-0115; Japan
- Coordinates: 35°21′57.73″N 139°2′18.43″E
- Operator: JR Central
- Line: Gotemba Line
- Distance: 20.0 km (12.4 mi) from Kōzu
- Platforms: 2 side platforms
- Tracks: 2
- Connections: Bus stop

Construction
- Structure type: At grade

Other information
- Status: Unstaffed
- Station code: CB07
- Website: https://gotembasen.net/eki/谷峨

History
- Opened: 15 July 1947; 79 years ago

Passengers
- FY2019: 104 daily

Services
Preceding station	JR Central	Following station
Suruga-Oyama CB08 towards Numazu	Gotemba Line	Yamakita CB06 towards Kōzu
Location
- Location within Kanagawa Prefecture Location within Kanto Area Location within Japan

Yaga Station (谷峨駅, Yaga-eki) is a passenger railway station located in the southern part of the town of Yamakita, Kanagawa, Japan, operated by Central Japan Railway Company (JR Central). Initially primarily a freight station, used to transport firewood and charcoal from the Tanzawa Mountains, Yaga Station now serves only passenger traffic to nearby Lake Tanzawa and the Nakagawa onsen resorts.

== Lines ==
Yaga Station is served by the Gotemba Line and is 20.0 kilometers from the terminus of the line at Kōzu Station

== Station layout ==
Yaga Station is an unattended station with two opposed ground side platforms.

== History ==
Yaga Station was established on March 15, 1907, as the Yaga Signal Stop of the Japanese Government Railways (JGR), the predecessor to the Japanese National Railways (JNR), when the line from Yamakita to Suruga-Oyama was completed. It was upgraded to a full station on July 15, 1947. The line was electrified in 1968, and freight operations discontinued from 1971. With the privatization of JNR on April 1, 1987, it came under the operational control of the Central Japan Railway Company. Express train service was discontinued from 1991. A new station building was completed in March 2000.

Station numbering was introduced to the Gotemba Line in March 2018; Yaga Station was assigned station number CB07.

== Passenger statistics ==
In fiscal 2018, the station was used by an average of 104 passengers daily (boarding passengers only).

The passenger figures (boarding passengers only) for previous years are as shown below.

Fiscal year	daily average
2005	175
2010	129
2015	116

== Bus services ==
- Fujikyu Shonan Bus
  - for Nishi Tanzawa via Lake Tanzawa and Nakagawa Onsen
  - for Shin-Matsuda Station (Odakyu Odawara Line) via Yamakita Station (JR Central)

== Surrounding area ==
- National Route 246

== See also ==
- List of railway stations in Japan
