= Shibusawa Station =

Railway station in Hadano, Kanagawa Prefecture, Japan

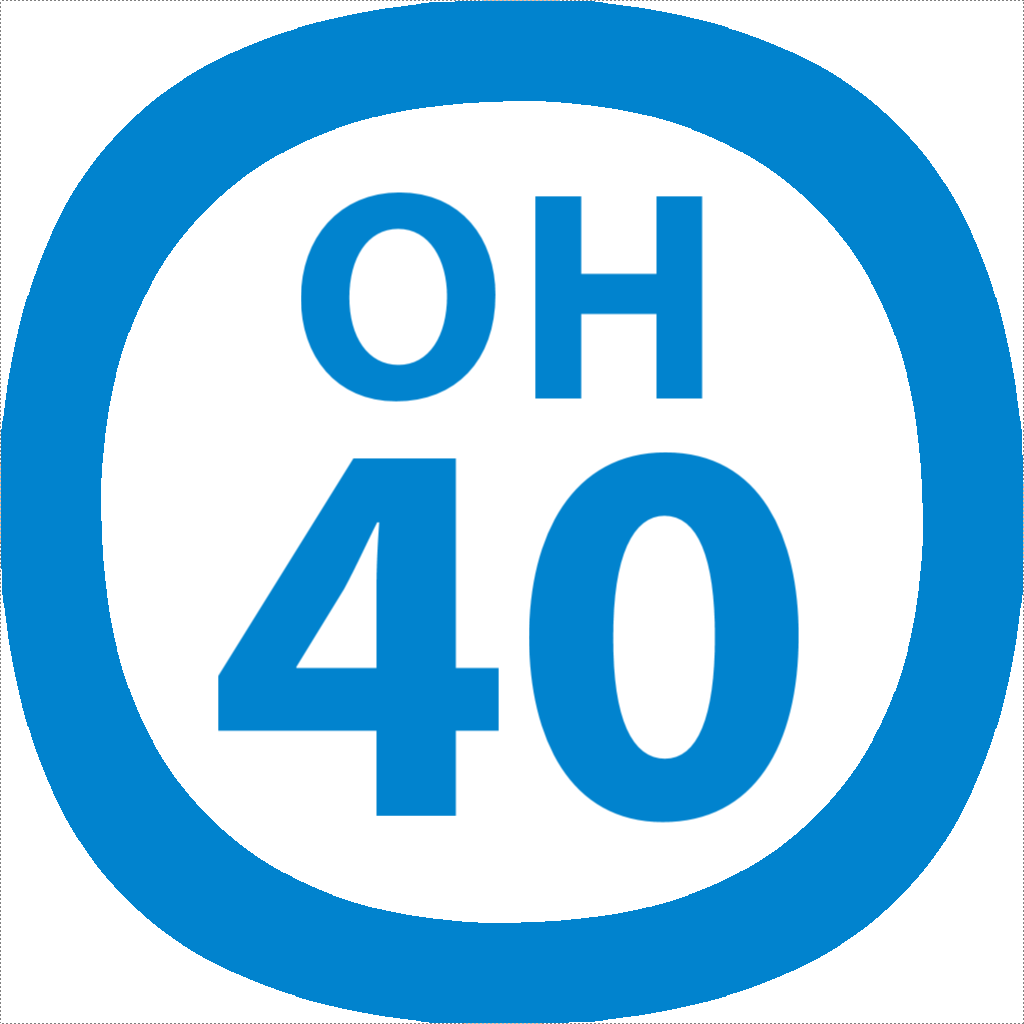
Shibusawa Station 渋沢駅

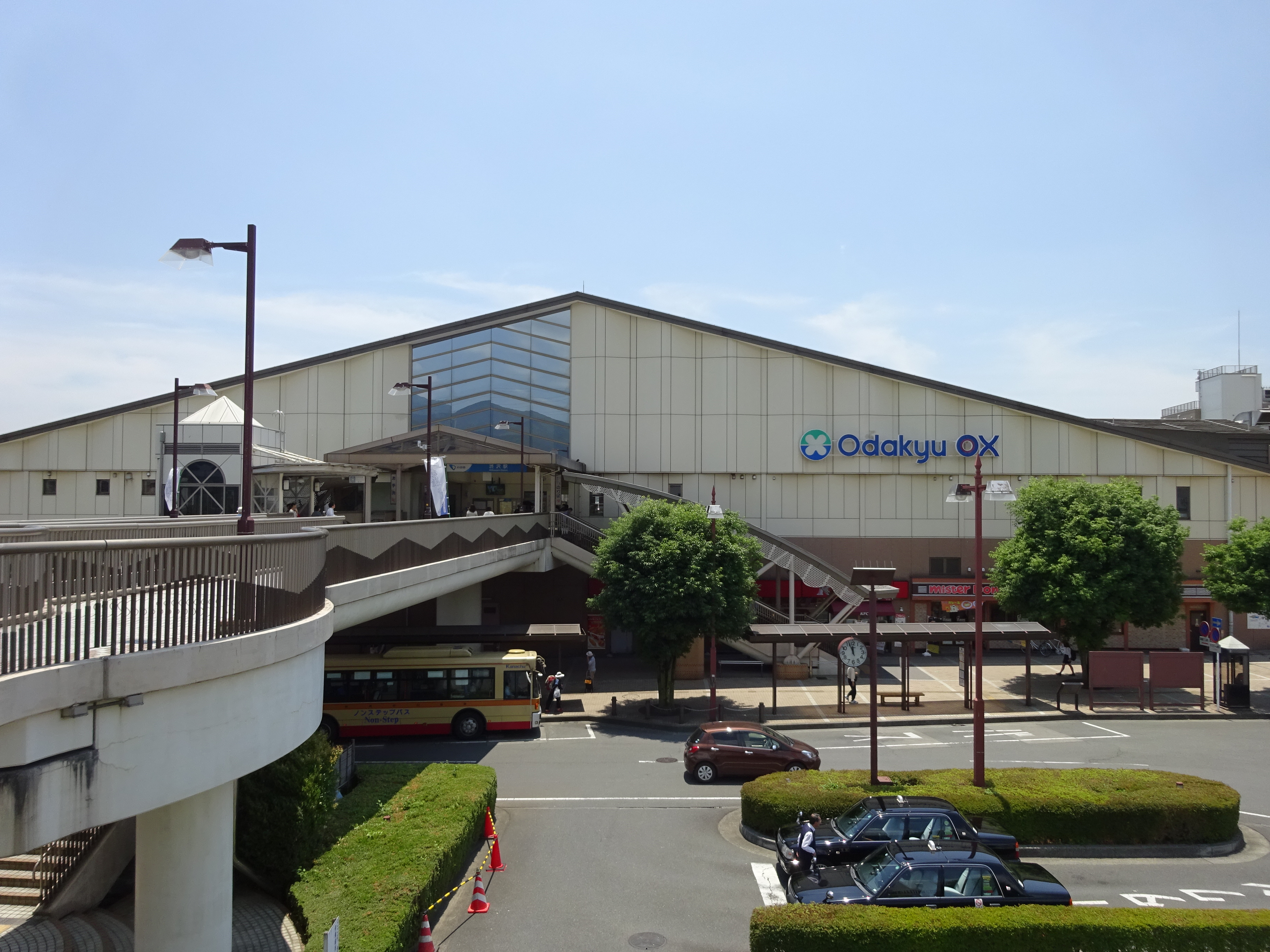
- Shibusawa Station North exit, June 2016

General information
- Location: 1-1-1 Magarimatsu, Hadano-shi, Kanagawa-ken 259-1321; Japan
- Coordinates: 35.374145°N 139.184525°E
- Operator: Odakyu Electric Railway
- Line: ■ Odakyu Odawara Line
- Distance: 65.6 km from Shinjuku
- Platforms: 2 side platforms
- Connections: Bus terminal

Other information
- Status: Staffed
- Station code: OH-40
- Website: Official website

History
- Opened: 1 April 1927; 99 years ago

Passengers
- FY2019: 27,175 daily

Services
Preceding station	Odakyu	Following station
Shin-Matsuda towards Odawara	Odawara Line Rapid Express	Hadano towards Shinjuku
Shin-Matsuda towards Odawara	Odawara Line Express Local	Hadano towards Shinjuku or Yoyogi-Uehara
Location
- Location within Kanagawa Prefecture Location within Japan

Concourse of Shibusawa Station

Shibusawa Station (渋沢駅, Shibusawa-eki) is a passenger railway station located in the city of Hadano, Kanagawa Prefecture, Japan. The station is operated by the private railway operator Odakyu Electric Railway.

== Lines ==
Shibusawa Station is served by the Odakyu Odawara Line, and lies 65.6 rail kilometers from the line's terminal at Shinjuku Station.

== Station layout ==
The station has two opposed side platforms with two tracks, with the station building constructed on a cantilever above the platforms and tracks.

=== Platforms ===
1	■ Odakyu Odawara Line	for Shin-Matsuda and Odawara
2	■ Odakyu Odawara Line	for Sagami-Ono, Shin-Yurigaoka, and Shinjuku

== History ==
Shibusawa Station was opened on 1 April 1927 on the Odakyu Odawara Line of the Odakyu Electric Railway with normal and six-car limited express services. The current station building was completed in 1993 and the bus terminal outside the south exit was expanded in 2007.

Station numbering was introduced in January 2014, with Shibusawa being assigned station number OH40.

== Passenger statistics ==
In fiscal 2019, the station was used by an average of 27,175 passengers daily.

The passenger figures for previous years are as shown below.

Fiscal year	Daily average
2005	27,060
2010	27,434
2015	28,058

== Surrounding area ==
- Hadano Nishi Community Center

== See also ==
- List of railway stations in Japan
