= Shin-Matsuda Station =

Railway station in Matsuda, Kanagawa Prefecture, Japan

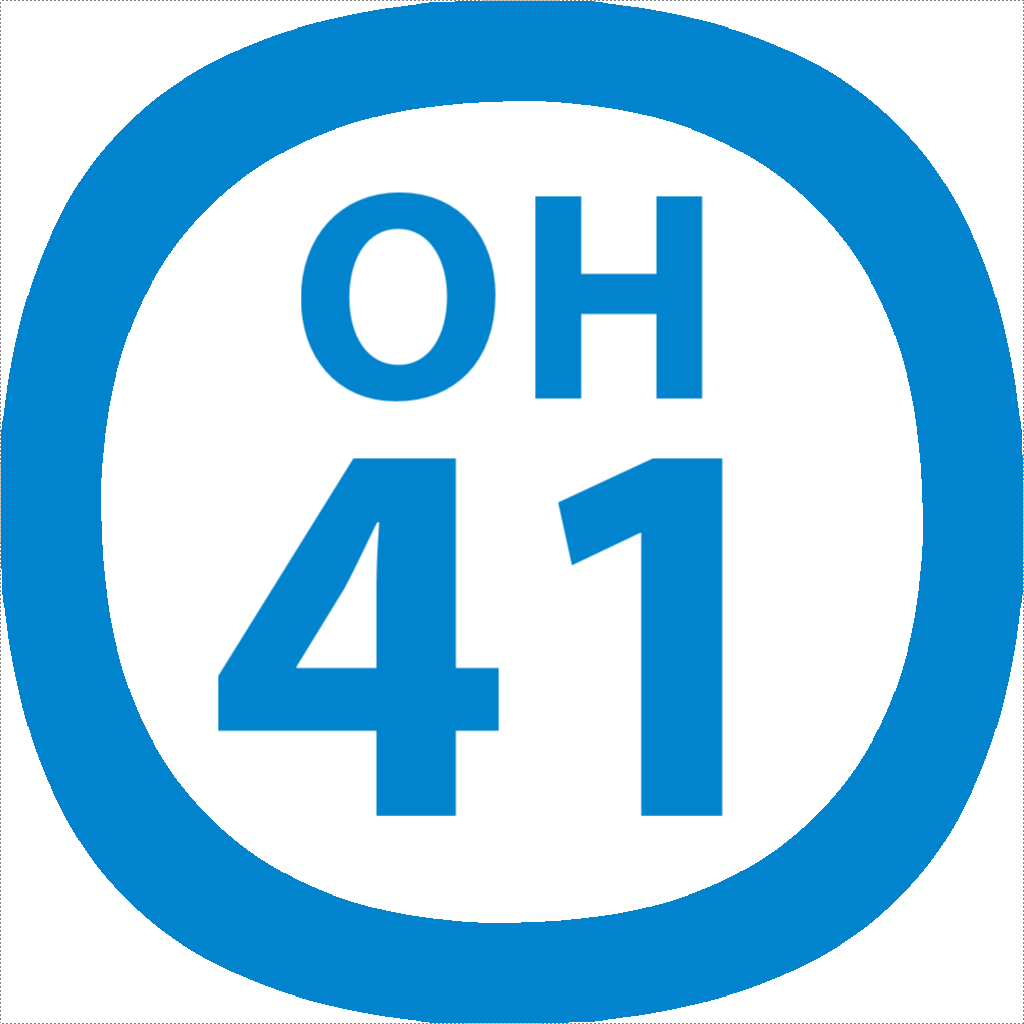
Shin-Matsuda Station 新松田駅

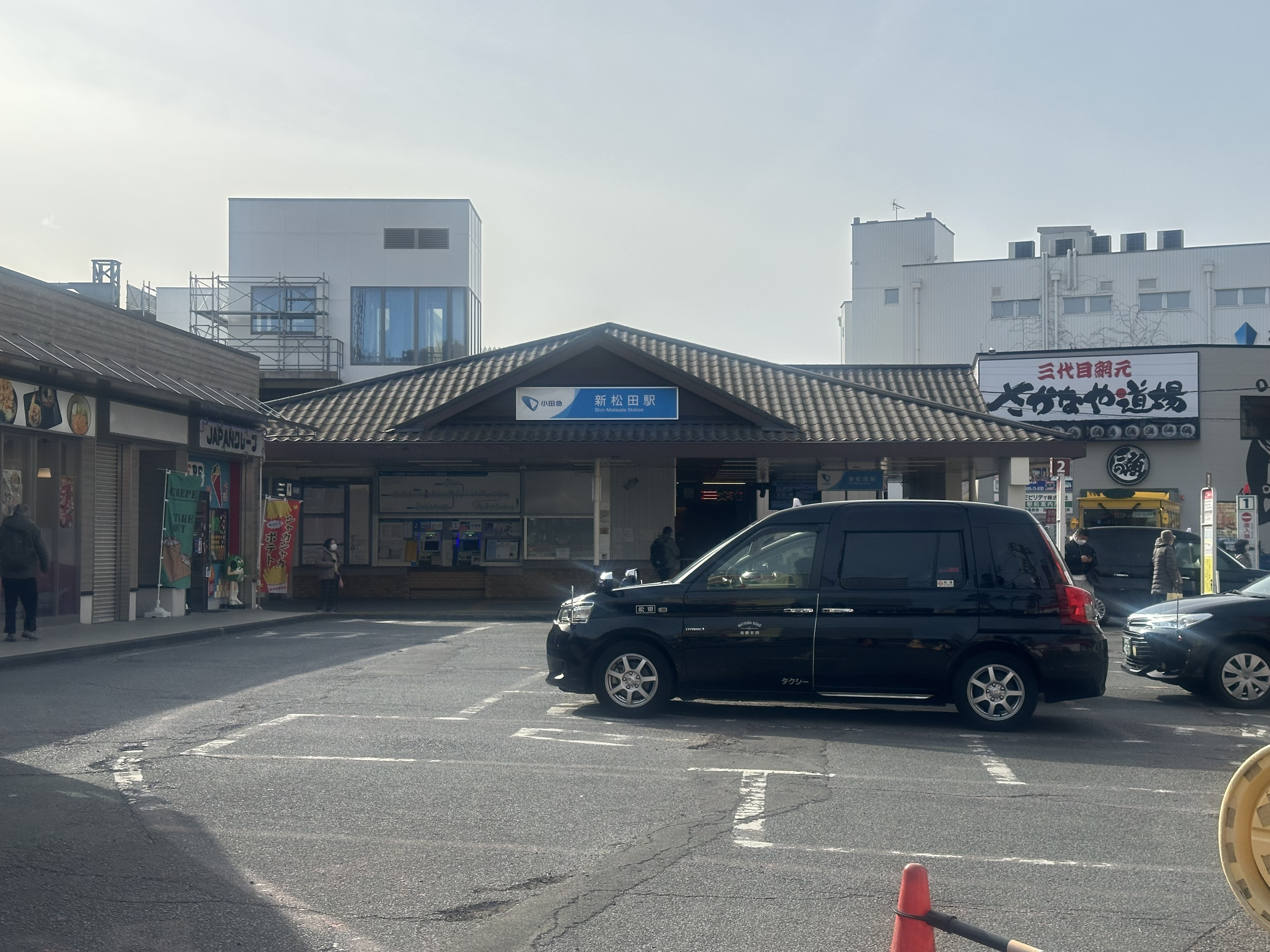
- North Exit of Shin-Matsuda Station, 2026

General information
- Location: 1356 Matsuda-Sōryō, Matsuda-machi, Ashigarakami-gun, Kanagawa-ken 258-0003; Japan
- Coordinates: 35°20′41.50″N 139°8′22.75″E
- Operator: Odakyu Electric Railway
- Line: ■ Odakyu Odawara Line
- Distance: 71.8 km from Shinjuku
- Platforms: 2 island platforms
- Connections: Bus terminal

Other information
- Status: Staffed
- Station code: OH-41
- Website: Official website

History
- Opened: 1 April 1927; 99 years ago

Passengers
- FY2019: 22,946 daily

Services
Preceding station	Odakyu	Following station
Kaisei towards Odawara	Odawara Line Rapid Express	Shibusawa towards Shinjuku
Kaisei towards Odawara	Odawara Line Express Local	Shibusawa towards Shinjuku or Yoyogi-Uehara
Location
- Location within Kanagawa Prefecture Location within Japan

Shin-Matsuda Station (新松田駅, Shin-Matsuda-eki) is a passenger railway station located in the town of Matsuda, Kanagawa, Japan, operated by the private railway operator Odakyu Electric Railway. Matsuda Station on the Gotemba Line operated by Central Japan Railway Company (JR Central) is located nearby.

== Lines ==
Shin-Matsuda Station is served by the Odakyu Odawara Line from Shinjuku in Tokyo to Odawara in Kanagawa Prefecture. The station is 71.8 km from the line's Tokyo terminal at Shinjuku.

== Station layout ==
Shin-Matsuda Station has two island platforms serving four tracks.

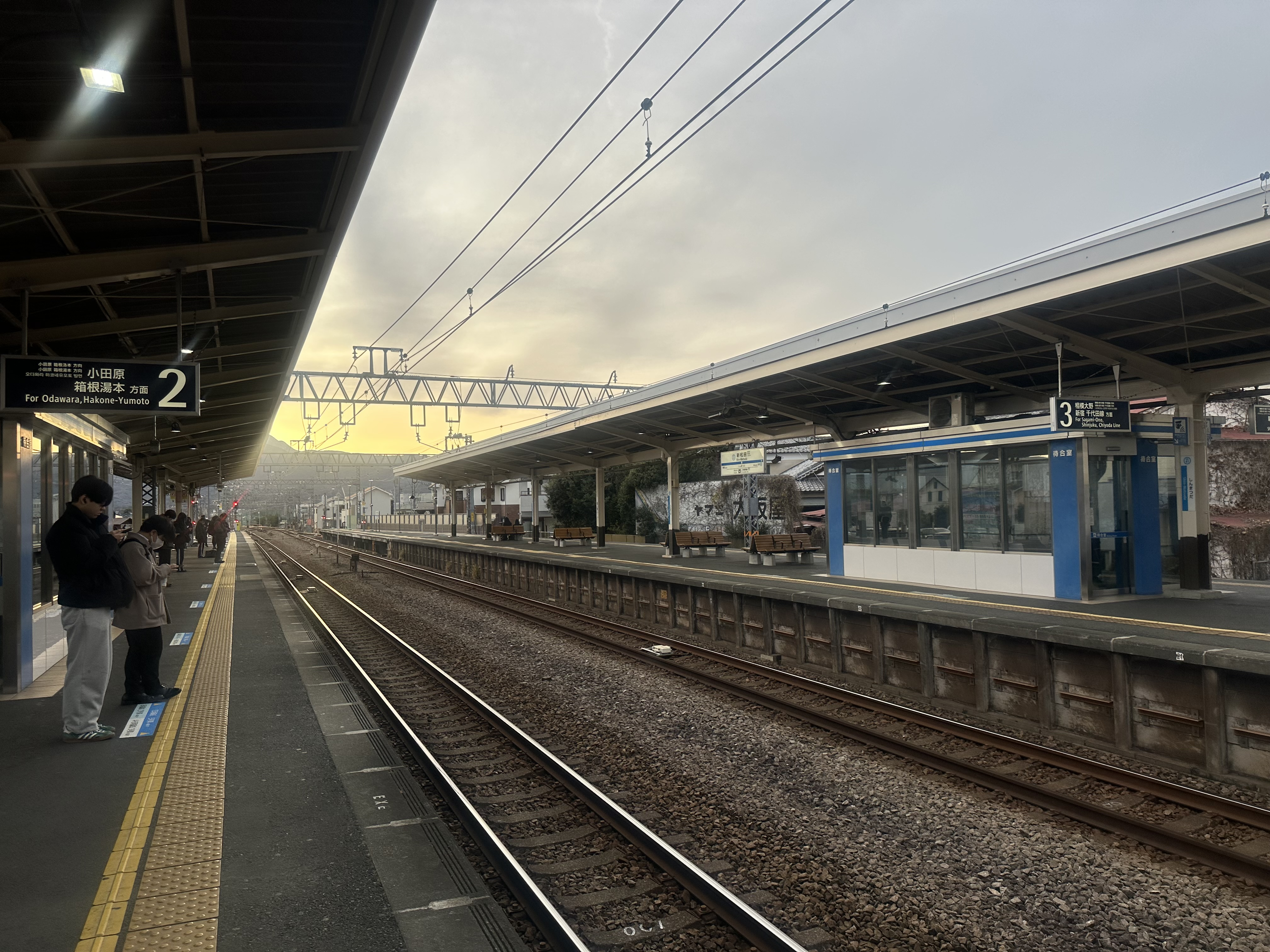
Station platforms

=== Platforms ===
1/2	■ Odakyu Odawara Line	for Odawara, Hakone-Yumoto
3/4	■ Odakyu Odawara Line	for Ebina, Sagami-Ono, Machida, Shinjuku, and Tokyo Metro Chiyoda Line for Ayase

- Note that some express services stop at all stations between Shin-Matsuda and Odawara.

== History ==
Shin-Matsuda Station opened on 1 April 1927. The current station building dates from March 1980, with the former station building relocated to the Mukogaoka Amusement Park for use as a railway museum.

Station numbering was introduced in January 2014 with Shin-Matsuda being assigned station number OH41.

== Passenger statistics ==
In fiscal 2019, the station was used by an average of 22,946 passengers daily (boarding passengers only).

The passenger figures (boarding passengers only) for previous years are as shown below.

Fiscal year	daily average
2005	25,024
2010	25,394
2015	23,304

== Bus services ==
- Hakone Tozan Bus
  - for Sekimoto (Daiyuzan Station) via Kaisei Town
  - for Jizodo via Sekimoto (Daiyuzan Station) and Yagurasawa
- Fujikyu Shonan Bus
  - for Nishi Tanzawa via JR Yamakita Station, JR Yaga Station, Lake Tanzawa (Kurokura and Nakagawa onsen)
  - for Asahi Breweries Kanagawa Brewery
  - for Yadoriki

== Surrounding area ==
- Kanagawa Prefectural Ashigarakami Hospital
- Matsuda Town Hall
- Matsuda Town Cultural Center
- Matsuda Town Gymnasium

== See also ==
- List of railway stations in Japan
