= Katahama Station =

Railway station in Numazu, Shizuoka Prefecture, Japan

CA04 Katahama Station 片浜駅
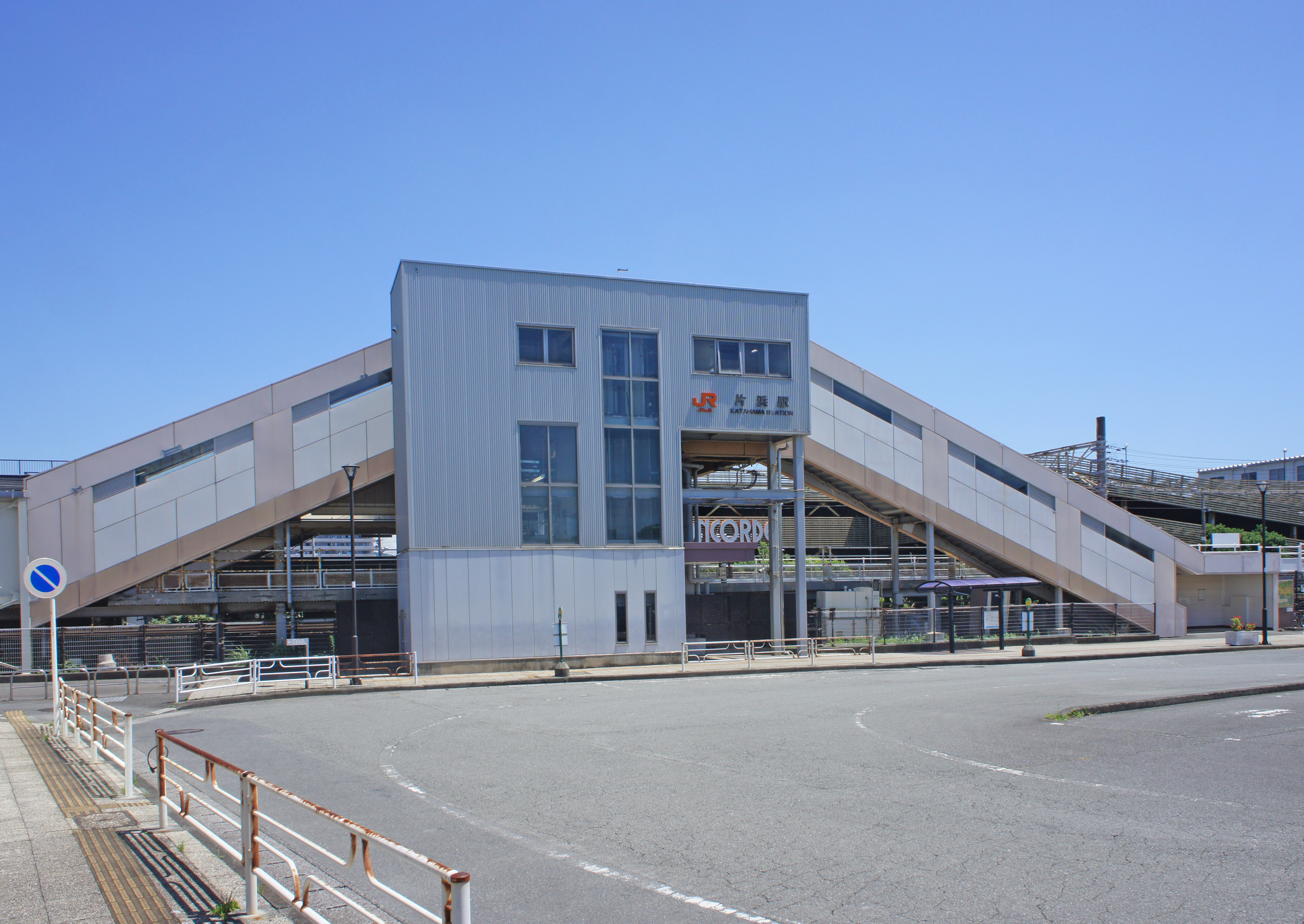
- Katahama Station in July 2022

General information
- Location: 254-1 Imazawa, Numazu-shi, Shizuoka-ken 410-0875; Japan
- Coordinates: 35.117986°N 138.819428°E
- Operator: JR Central
- Line: ■ Tokaido Main Line
- Distance: 130.3 km from Tokyo
- Platforms: 2 side platforms
- Tracks: 2
- Connections: Bus terminal

Other information
- Station code: CA04
- Website: Official website

History
- Opened: 21 March 1987

Passengers
- FY2017: 2452 daily
Location
- Location within Shizuoka Prefecture Location within Japan

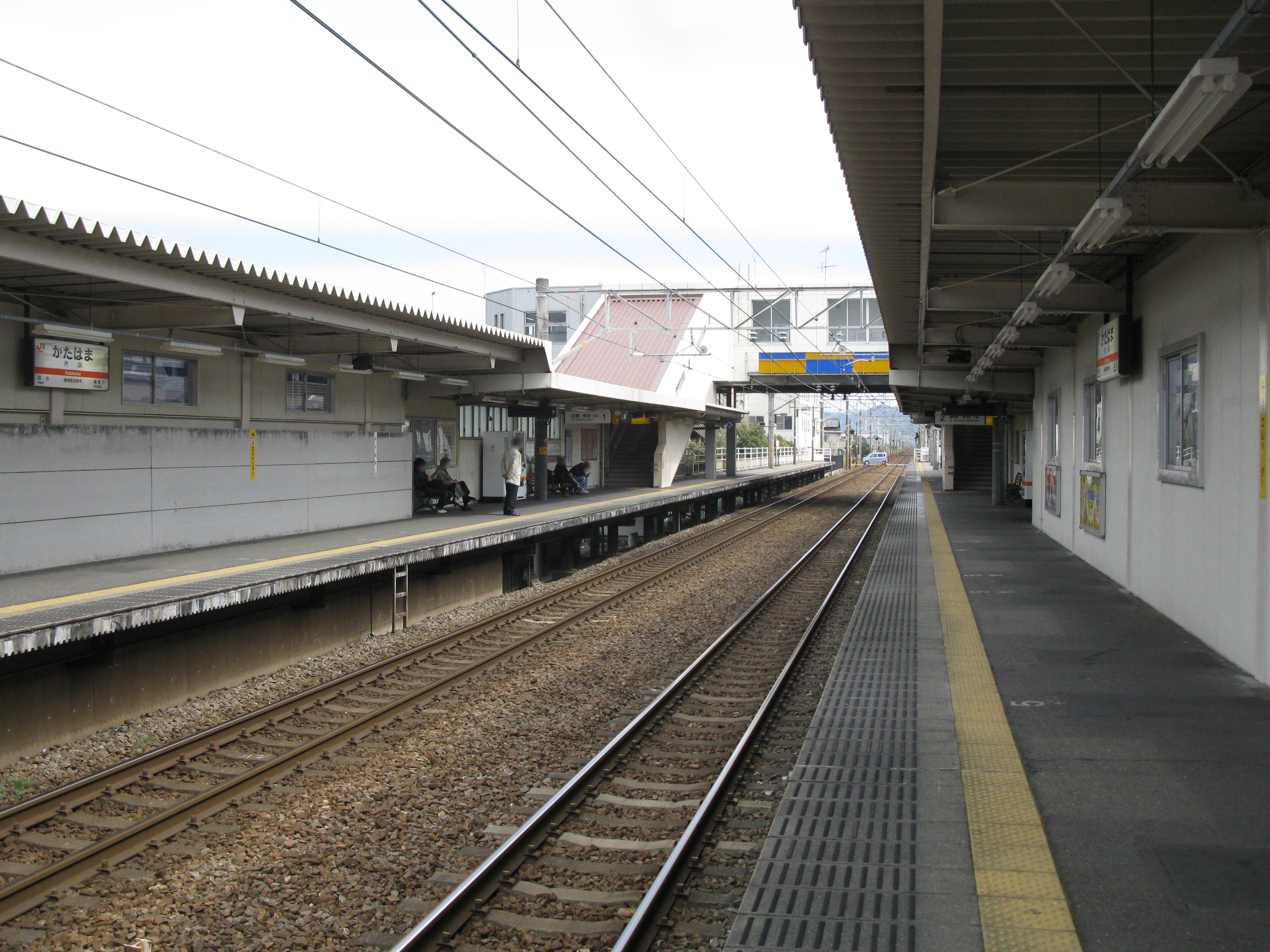
Platforms

Katahama Station (片浜駅, Katahama-eki) is a railway station in the city of Numazu, Shizuoka Prefecture, Japan, operated by Central Japan Railway Company (JR Tōkai).

== Lines ==
Katahama Station is served by the Tōkaidō Main Line, and is located 130.3 kilometers from the starting point of the line at Tokyo Station.

== Station layout ==
The station has two opposing side platforms serving two tracks, with the station building built over the platforms. The station building has automated ticket machines, TOICA automated turnstiles, and a staffed ticket office.

=== Platforms ===
1	■ Tokaido Main Line	for Numazu and Atami
2	■ Tokaido Main Line	for Shizuoka and Hamamatsu

== Adjacent stations ==
«	Service	»
Tokaido Main Line CA04
Rapid: Does not stop at this station
Hara CA05	Local	Numazu CA03

== History ==
Katahama Station opened on March 21, 1987, the last train station to be built by the Japanese National Railways (JNR) before its privatization. With the privatization of JNR on 1 April 1987, the station came under the control of JR Central.

Station numbering was introduced to the section of the Tōkaidō Line operated JR Central in March 2018; Katahama Station was assigned station number CA04.

== Passenger statistics ==
In fiscal 2017, the station was used by an average of 2452 passengers daily (boarding passengers only).

== Surrounding area ==
The station is located in a suburban residential area to the east of the center of Numazu.

== See also ==
- List of railway stations in Japan
