= Gotemba Line =

Railway line in Japan

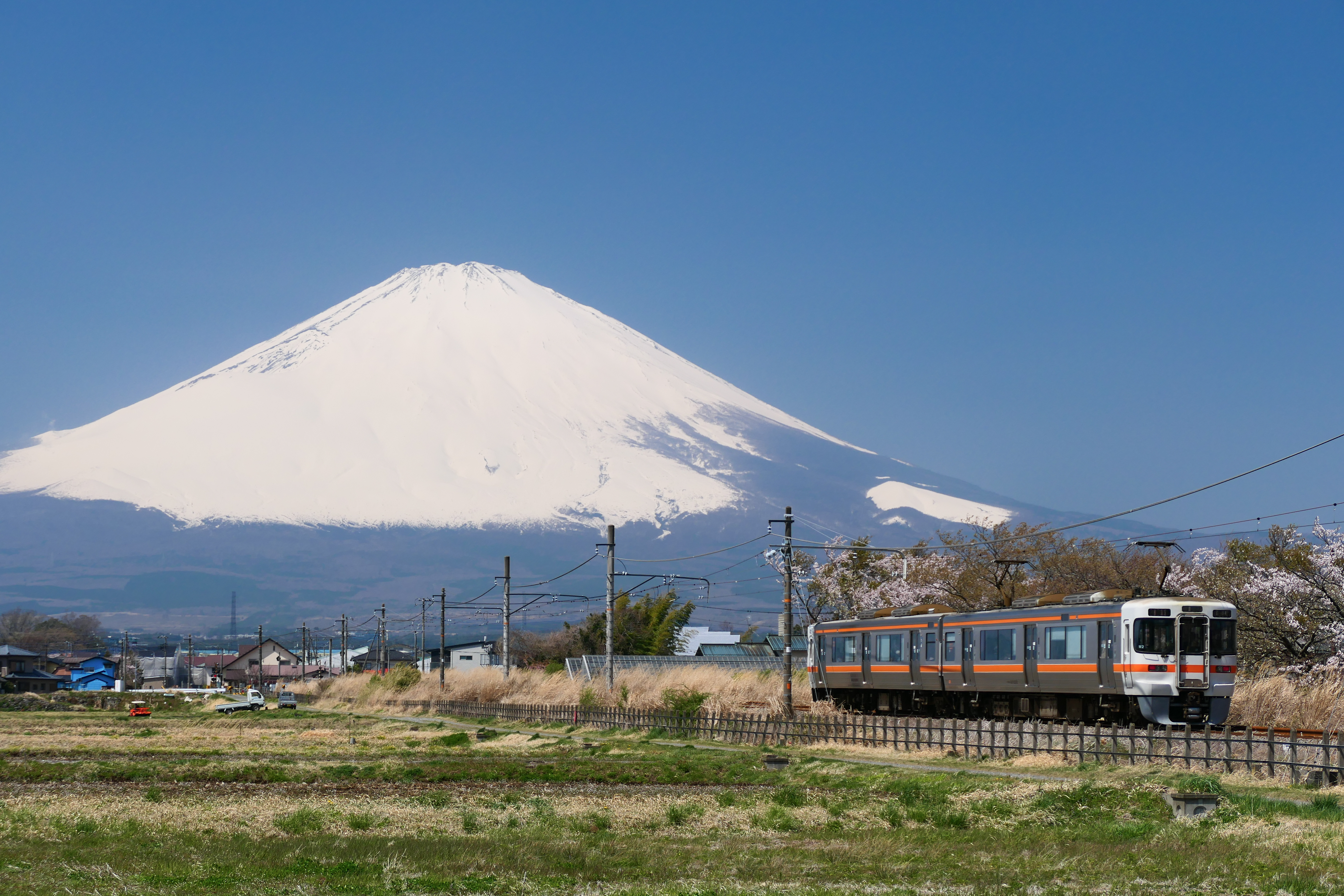
- JR Central 313 series train with Mount Fuji in the background, April 2022

Overview
- Owner: JR Central
- Termini: Kōzu; Numazu
- Stations: 19
- Color on map: Olive (#477543)

Service
- Type: Passenger/freight
- Operator(s): JR Central; JR Freight
- Rolling stock: 315 series 313 series 211 series Odakyu 60000 series MSE

History
- Opened: 1 February 1889; 137 years ago

Technical
- Line length: 60.2 km (37.4 mi)
- Number of tracks: Entirely single-track
- Track gauge: 1,067 mm (3 ft 6 in)
- Electrification: 1,500 V DC (overhead line)
- Operating speed: 110 km/h (68 mph)
- Train protection system: ATS-PT
- Maximum incline: 2.5%
Route map

The Gotemba Line (御殿場線, Gotemba-sen) is a railway line in Japan operated by the Central Japan Railway Company (JR Central). It connects Kōzu Station in Odawara to Numazu via Gotemba.

The Mt. Fuji limited express service runs between Tokyo's Shinjuku Station and Gotemba via Matsuda.

== Stations ==
No.	Station name	Japanese	Distance from Kōzu	Transfers	Location	
No.	Station name	Japanese	Distance from Kōzu	Transfers	Town/city	Prefecture
CB00	Kōzu	国府津	0.0 km (0 mi)	Tōkaidō Line	Odawara	Kanagawa
CB01	Shimo-Soga	下曽我	3.8 km (2.4 mi)		Odawara	Kanagawa
CB02	Kami-Ōi	上大井	6.5 km (4.0 mi)		Ashigarakami District, Ōi	Kanagawa
CB03	Sagami-Kaneko	相模金子	8.3 km (5.2 mi)		Ashigarakami District, Ōi	Kanagawa
CB04	Matsuda	松田	10.2 km (6.3 mi)	Odawara Line (Shin-Matsuda)	Ashigarakami District, Matsuda	Kanagawa
CB05	Higashi-Yamakita	東山北	13.1 km (8.1 mi)		Ashigarakami District, Yamakita	Kanagawa
CB06	Yamakita	山北	15.9 km (9.9 mi)		Ashigarakami District, Yamakita	Kanagawa
CB07	Yaga	谷峨	20.0 km (12.4 mi)		Ashigarakami District, Yamakita	Kanagawa
CB08	Suruga-Oyama	駿河小山	24.6 km (15.3 mi)		Suntō District, Oyama	Shizuoka
CB09	Ashigara	足柄	28.9 km (18.0 mi)		Suntō District, Oyama	Shizuoka
CB10	Gotemba	御殿場	35.5 km (22.1 mi)		Gotemba	Shizuoka
CB11	Minami-Gotemba	南御殿場	38.2 km (23.7 mi)		Gotemba	Shizuoka
CB12	Fujioka	富士岡	40.6 km (25.2 mi)		Gotemba	Shizuoka
CB13	Iwanami	岩波	45.3 km (28.1 mi)		Susono	Shizuoka
CB14	Susono	裾野	50.7 km (31.5 mi)		Susono	Shizuoka
CB15	Nagaizumi-Nameri	長泉なめり	53.5 km (33.2 mi)		Suntō District, Nagaizumi	Shizuoka
CB16	Shimo-Togari	下土狩	55.6 km (34.5 mi)		Suntō District, Nagaizumi	Shizuoka
CB17	Ōoka	大岡	57.8 km (35.9 mi)		Numazu	Shizuoka
CB18	Numazu	沼津	60.2 km (37.4 mi)	Tōkaidō Main Line	Numazu	Shizuoka

== Rolling stock ==
=== Local services ===
- 315 series
- 313 series

=== Limited express Mt. Fuji (formerly named Asagiri) services ===
- Odakyu 60000 series MSE (from March 2012)

=== Past ===
- 211 series (until 2025)
- 113 series
- Odakyu 3000 series SE (until 1991)
- 115 series (until 2007)
- E231 series (until March 2012)
- 371 series (Asagiri services, until March 2012)
- Odakyu 20000 series RSE (Asagiri services, until March 2012)

== History ==
The present-day Gotemba Line was built as part of the original route of the Tōkaidō Main Line connecting Tokyo with Osaka. The portion between Kōzu and Numazu was opened on February 1, 1889, although it was not officially named the "Tokaido Line" until 1896. Portions were double tracked from 1891 and the double tracking was completed by 1901.

The line took an indirect route between Kōzu and Numazu in order to avoid the Hakone Mountains, which affected the potential journey time between Tokyo and Osaka. A more direct route had been planned as early as 1909, but technical difficulties delayed the completion of the Tanna Tunnel until December 1, 1934. With the opening of the tunnel, the route of the Tōkaidō Main Line became via Atami Station, leaving the section between Kōzu Station and Numazu Station as a spur line renamed as the Gotemba Line.

In 1943, due to the reduced traffic on the Gotemba line, and the urgent requirement for steel in World War II, the line was returned to a single track railway. Diesel multiple units replaced steam locomotive-hauled passenger trains in 1955, and a cooperative agreement was reached with the privately owned Odakyu Electric Railway to operate express trains directly from Shinjuku Station in Tokyo in the same year. The line was electrified from 1968, and regularly scheduled freight services were discontinued at most stations by 1982.

A new centralized traffic control system was installed in December 1989, with a programmed route control system implemented from March 1990. Installation for the TOICA automated turnstile system was completed at all stations in 2010.

=== Former connecting lines ===
- Gotemba station - A 19 km 762mm gauge horse tramway opened to Kawaguchiko in 1898, closed in 1905 but was reopened in 1909. It connected to the Tsuru horse tramway, providing a connection to Otsuki station on the Chuo Main Line until 1919, when it was truncated by 9 km, completely closing 10 years later.
- Shimo-Togari station - The Izu Railway Co. opened a line to Shuzenji in 1898, electrifying the line at 1500V DC in 1918. In 1934 following the opening of the Tanna Tunnel and associated realignment, the line was truncated to Mishima-Hirokoji station on the Tokaido Main Line.
