= Lake Tanzawa =

- 丹沢湖 (Japanese)
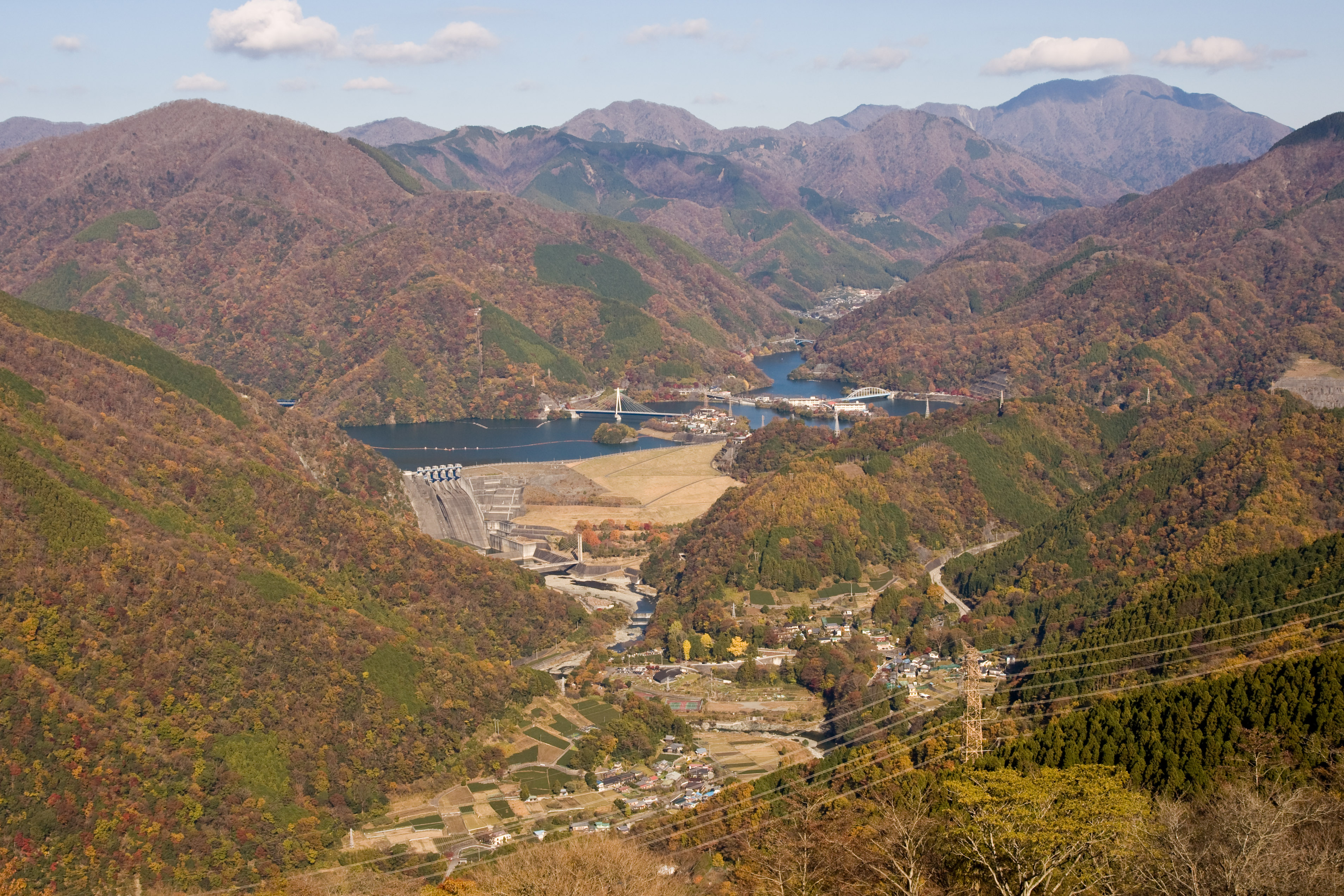
- Lake Tanzawa from the South

- Location within Kanagawa Prefecture
- Location: Kanagawa Prefecture
- Coordinates: 35°25′N 139°3′E
- Type: reservoir
- Primary inflows: Kurokuragawa, Yozukugawa, Nakagawa
- Primary outflows: Kōchigawa
- Basin countries: Japan
- Max. length: 2.1 km (1.3 mi)
- Max. width: 5.0 km (3.1 mi)
- Surface area: 2.18 km^{2} (0.84 sq mi)
- Water volume: 0.0649 km^{3} (52,600 acre⋅ft)
- Surface elevation: 320 m (1,050 ft)

Lake Tanzawa (丹沢湖, Tanzawa-ko), is a lake located to the east of Mt. Fuji in Yamakita town, Ashigarakami district, in the Kanagawa Prefecture of Japan. The lake and its surroundings are frequently visited during fall to admire autumn colors.

== History ==
This Lake was created due to construction of the Miho dam in 1978.

== Around ==
- Nakagawa Spa
- Lake Tanzawa Campsite

== Access ==
By Fujikyu Shonan Bus from Odakyu Line Shin-Matsuda Station, or JR Gotemba Line Yaga Station.

== See also ==
- Tanzawa Mountains
