= Gotemba Station =

Railway station in Shizuoka Prefecture, Japan

CB10 Gotemba Station 御殿場駅
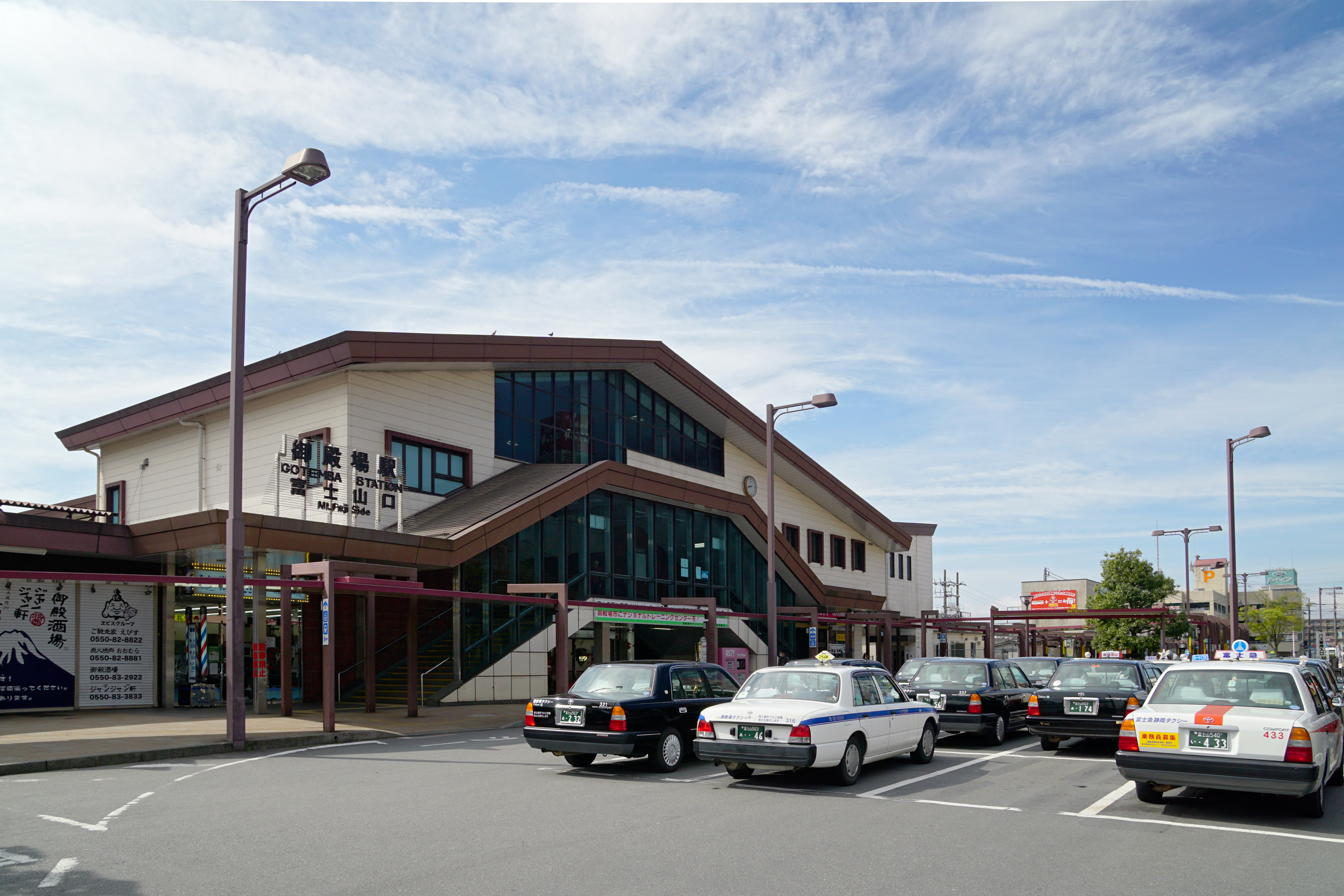
- Mount Fuji Side in May 2017

General information
- Location: 1898-3 Niihashi, Gotemba Town, Shizuoka Prefecture; Japan
- Coordinates: 35.300467°N 138.934361°E
- Operator: JR Central
- Line: Gotemba Line
- Distance: 35.5 km (22.1 mi) from Kōzu
- Platforms: 1 side + 1 island platform

Construction
- Structure type: At grade

Other information
- Status: Staffed
- Station code: CB10

History
- Opened: 1 February 1889; 137 years ago

Passengers
- FY2017: 4,879 daily

Services
Preceding station	JR Central	Following station
Minami-Gotemba CB11 towards Numazu	Gotemba Line	Ashigara CB09 towards Kōzu
Terminus	Romancecar	Suruga-Oyama CB08 towards Shinjuku or Kita-Senju
Location
- Location within Shizuoka Prefecture Location within Central Japan Location within Japan

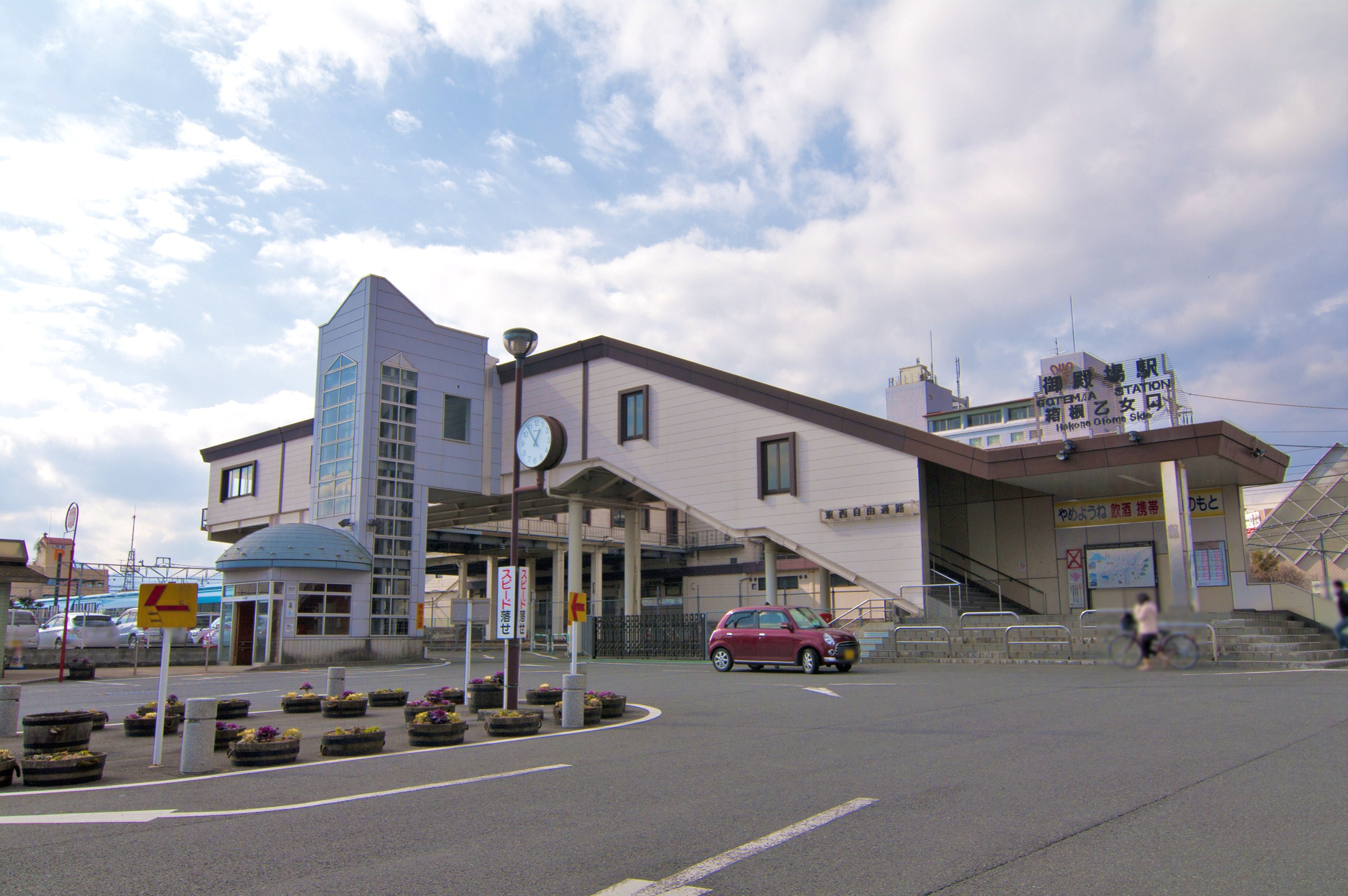
Hakone Otome Side in February 2012

Gotemba Station (御殿場駅, Gotenba-eki) is a railway station on the Gotemba Line in the eastern part of the city of Gotemba, Shizuoka, Japan, operated by Central Japan Railway Company (JR Central). It is one of the gateway stations to Mount Fuji and the Fuji Five Lakes (including Lake Kawaguchi and Lake Yamanaka).

== Lines ==
Gotemba Station is served by the Gotemba Line, and is located 35.5 kilometers from the official starting point of the line at Kōzu. The limited express train Mt. Fuji runs between Shinjuku (Tokyo) and this station via Matsuda.

== Station layout ==
Gotemba Station has a single side platform and a single island platform serving three tracks. The station building has automated ticket machines, IC card TOICA automated turnstiles, and a staffed ticket office. The station building is elevated above the platforms.

=== Platforms ===
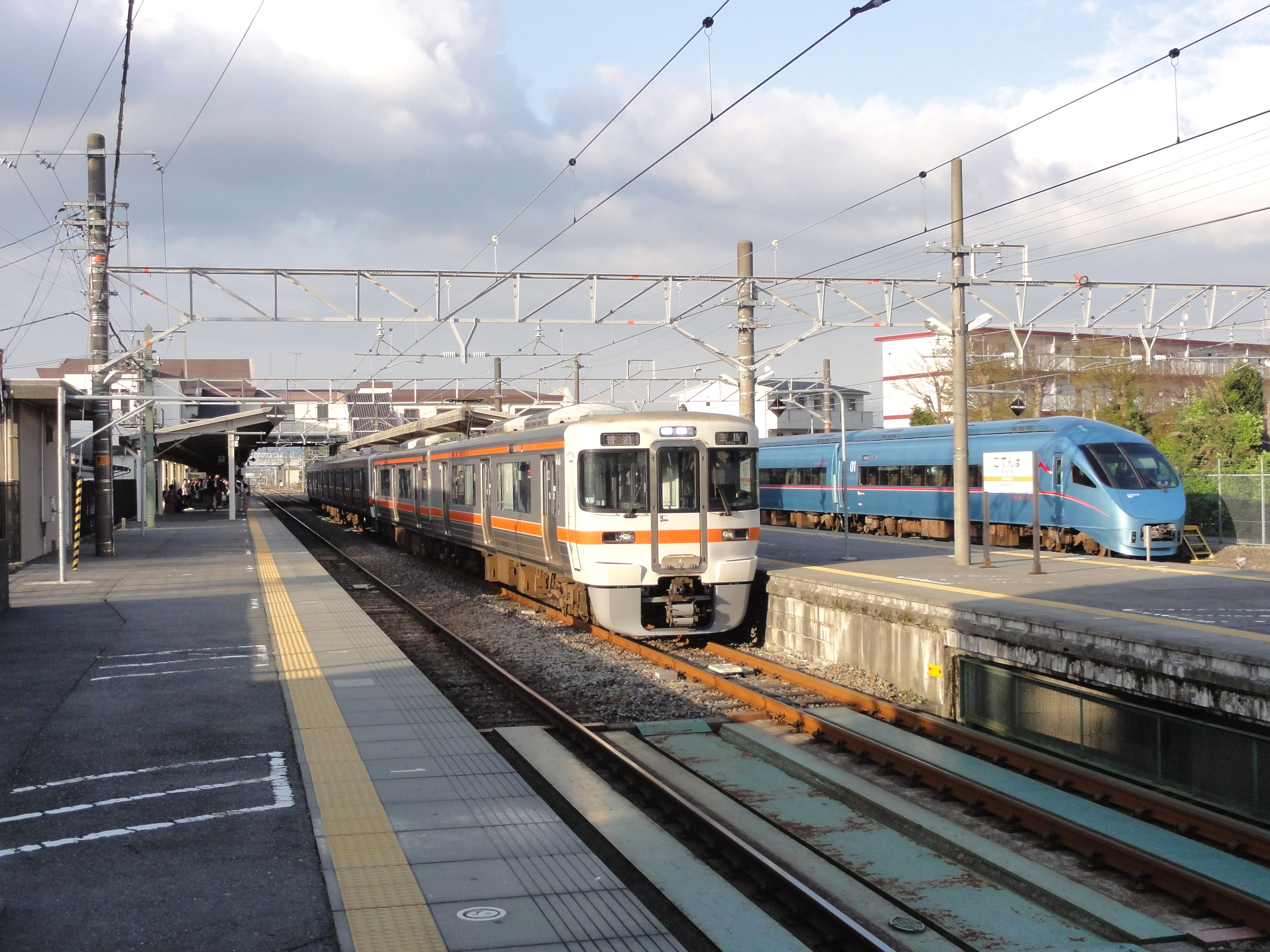
View of the platforms in April 2012

1	Gotemba Line	for Yamakita, Matsuda, and Kōzu
2	Gotemba Line	for Susono and Numazu
3	Gotemba Line	for both directions, and Limited Express Mt. Fuji for Shinjuku

== History ==
Gotemba Station opened on February 1, 1889 as one of the original stations of the Tōkaidō Main Line between Kōzu and Shizuoka.

From 1955, in a joint operation with Odakyu Electric Railway, JNR began operating the limited express Asagiri service from Shinjuku to Gotemba.

Along with its division and privatization of JNR on April 1, 1987, the station came under the control and operation of the Central Japan Railway Company.

Station numbering was introduced to the Gotemba Line in March 2018; Gotemba Station was assigned station number CB10.

== Passenger statistics ==
In fiscal 2017, the station was used by an average of 4879 passengers daily (boarding passengers only).

== Surrounding area ==
- Gotemba Minami High School
- Gotemba High School

== Bus terminals ==
Bus tickets can be bought at Bus Information on each side. "Hakone Free Pass" (excursion ticket) can be bought at Tourist Information on Hakone Otome side.

- Mount Fuji side
  - for Kawaguchiko Station (Lake Kawaguchi) via Mt. Fuji Station (Fujikyuko Line) and Lake Yamanaka, by Fujikyu Bus
  - for Mount Fuji 5th stage and Camp Fuji (USMC), by Fujikyu Bus
  - for Ten-yu via Miyagino, Gora Station, Hakone Open-Air Museum and Yunessun, by Hakone Tozan Bus (afternoon)
  - for Yokohama Station, by Fuji Express and Sotetsu Bus
  - for Kyōto Station, Ōsaka Station, Namba Station, and Ōsaka Abenobashi Station, by Fujikyu Shonan Bus and Kintetsu Bus
- Hakone Otome side
  - for Gotemba Premium Outlets, by Free Shuttle Bus
  - for Hakone Area (Togendai (Lake Ashi)) via Otome Toge and Sengoku (transfer for Gora Station, Miyanoshita, Hakone Yumoto Station, and Odawara Station), by Odakyu Hakone Highway Bus
  - for Ten-yu via Miyagino, Gora Station, Hakone Open-Air Museum and Yunessun, by Hakone Tozan Bus (before noon)
  - for Shinjuku Station (in Tokyo) via Tōmei-Gotemba (transfer for Tōmei Expressway Bus for JR Shizuoka Station and JR Nagoya Station), by Odakyu Hakone Highway Bus
  - for Haneda Airport via JR Yokohama Station, by Odakyu Hakone Highway Bus (joint operation with Keikyu Bus)

== See also ==
- List of railway stations in Japan
