= Matsuda Station =

Railway station in Matsuda, Kanagawa Prefecture, Japan

CB04 Matsuda Station 松田駅
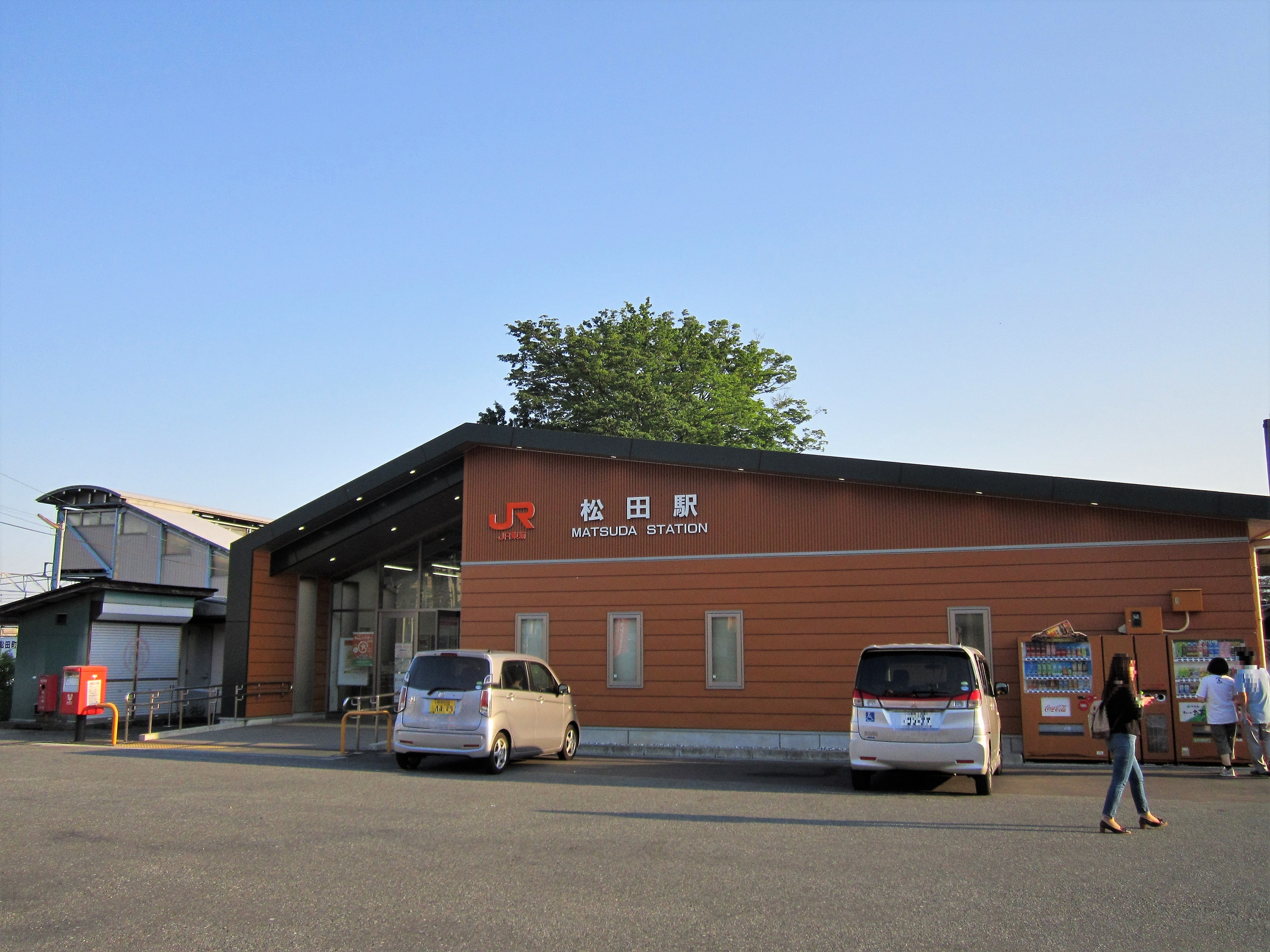
- Matsuda Station north entrance, May 2019

General information
- Location: Matsuda-Sōryō, Matsuda Town, Ashigarakami District, Kanagawa Prefecture 258-0003; Japan
- Coordinates: 35°20′47.78″N 139°8′16.33″E
- Operator: JR Central; JR Freight
- Line: Gotemba Line
- Distance: 10.2 km (6.3 mi) from Kōzu
- Platforms: 1 side + 1 island platform
- Tracks: 3

Construction
- Structure type: At grade

Other information
- Status: Staffed
- Station code: CB04
- Website: Official website

History
- Opened: 1 February 1889; 137 years ago

Passengers
- FY2019: 3,305 daily

Services
Preceding station	JR Central	Following station
Higashi-Yamakita CB05 towards Numazu	Gotemba Line	Sagami-Kaneko CB03 towards Kōzu
Suruga-Oyama CB08 towards Gotemba	Romancecar	Hadano towards Shinjuku or Kita-Senju
Location
- Location within Kanagawa Prefecture Location within Kanto Area Location within Japan

Matsuda Station (松田駅, Matsuda-eki) is a passenger railway station located in the southern portion of the town of Matsuda in Ashigarakami District, Kanagawa, Japan, operated by Central Japan Railway Company (JR Central). It is also a freight depot for the Japan Freight Railway Company (JR Freight).

== Lines ==
Matsuda Station is served by the Gotemba Line. The limited express Mt. Fuji service runs between Shinjuku in Tokyo and Gotemba via this station. Shin-Matsuda Station on the Odakyu Odawara Line is located nearby.

== Station layout ==
Matsuda Station has an island platform and a side platform serving three tracks. The two platforms are connected with a footbridge, and an underpass connects the island platform with the station building. The station building has automated ticket machines, TOICA automated turnstiles and a "JR Ticket office" staffed ticket office.

=== Platforms ===
1	■ Mt. Fuji	for Gotemba or Shinjuku
2	■ Gotemba Line	for Kōzu
3	■ Gotemba Line	for Gotemba, Susono, and Numazu

== History ==
Matsuda Station opened on 1 February 1889.

Station numbering was introduced to the Gotemba Line in March 2018; Matsuda Station was assigned station number CB04.

== Passenger statistics ==
In fiscal 2019, the station was used by an average of 3,305 passengers daily (boarding passengers only).

The passenger figures (boarding passengers only) for previous years are as shown below.

Fiscal year	daily average
2005	3,825
2010	3,634
2015	3,318

== Surrounding area ==
- Kanagawa Prefectural Ashigarakami Hospital
- Matsuda Town Hall
- Matsuda Town Cultural Center
- Matsuda Town Gymnasium

== See also ==
- List of railway stations in Japan
