= Numazu Station =

Railway station in Numazu, Shizuoka Prefecture, Japan

CA03 CB18 Numazu 沼津
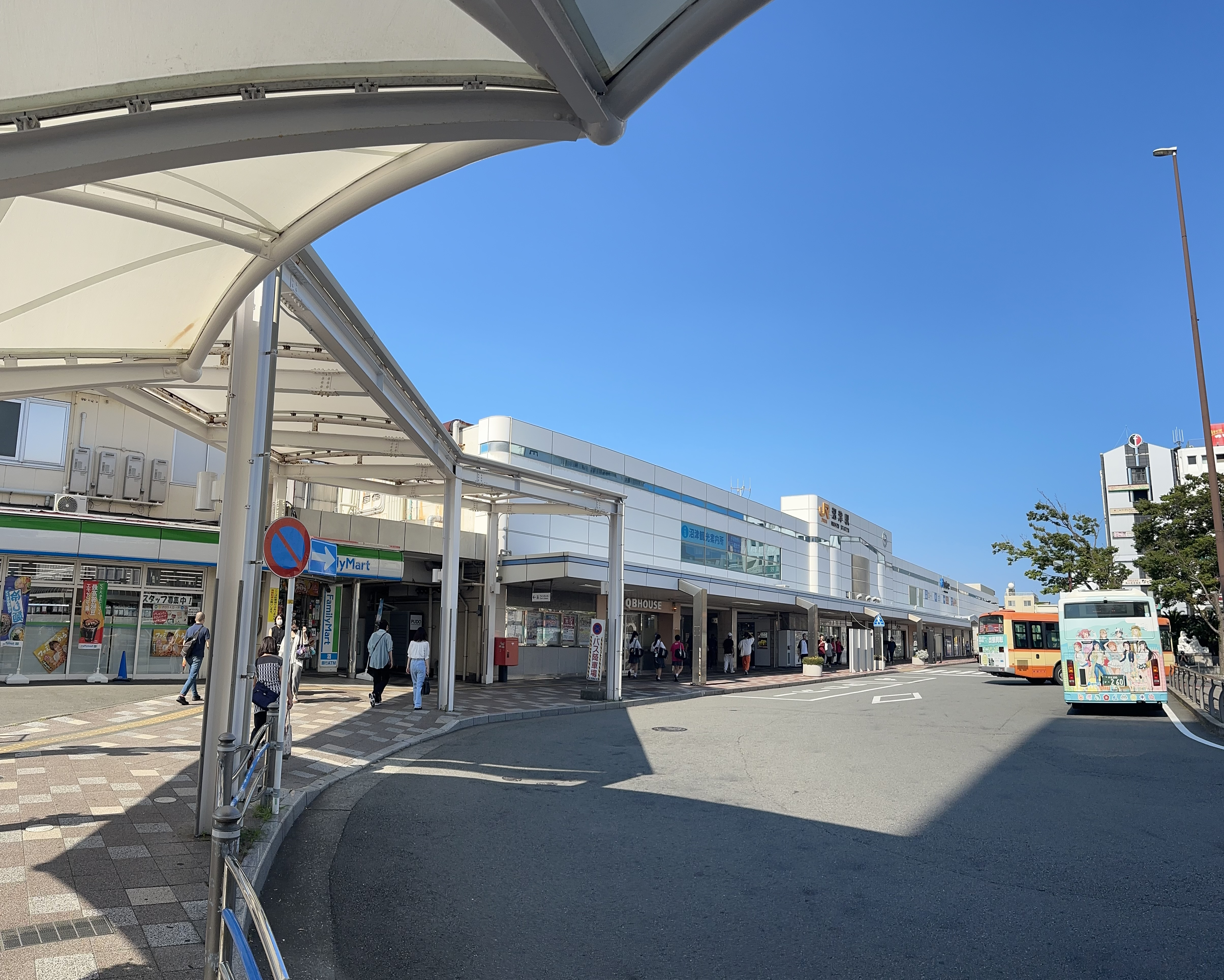
- South exit, 2023

General information
- Location: 1 Ōtemachi, Numazu City, Shizuoka Prefecture; Japan
- Coordinates: 35°6′11.19″N 138°51′33.40″E
- Operator: JR Central; JR Freight
- Lines: Tōkaidō Main Line; Gotemba Line
- Distance: 126.2 km (78.4 mi) from Tokyo
- Platforms: 3 island platforms'
- Tracks: 6

Construction
- Structure type: At grade

Other information
- Status: Staffed
- Station code: CA03; CB18

History
- Opened: 1 February 1889; 137 years ago

Passengers
- FY2017: 20,941 daily

Services
Preceding station	JR Central	Following station
Fuji CA08 towards Maibara	Sunrise Izumo and Sunrise Seto	Atami CA00 Terminus
Katahama CA04 towards Maibara	Tōkaidō Main Line Rapid	Terminus
Katahama CA04 towards Maibara	Tōkaidō Main Line Local	Mishima CA02 towards Atami
Terminus	Gotemba Line	Ōoka CB17 towards Kōzu
Location
- Location within Shizuoka Prefecture Location within Central Japan Location within Japan

Numazu Station (沼津駅, Numazu-eki) is an interchange railway station on the Tōkaidō Main Line in the city of Numazu, Shizuoka, Japan, operated by Central Japan Railway Company (JR Central). The station is also a freight terminal and rail yard for the Japan Freight Railway Company (JR Freight).

== Lines ==
Numazu Station is served by the Tōkaidō Main Line and the Gotemba Line. It lies 62.2 kilometers from Kōzu and 126.2 km from Tokyo Station.

== Station layout ==
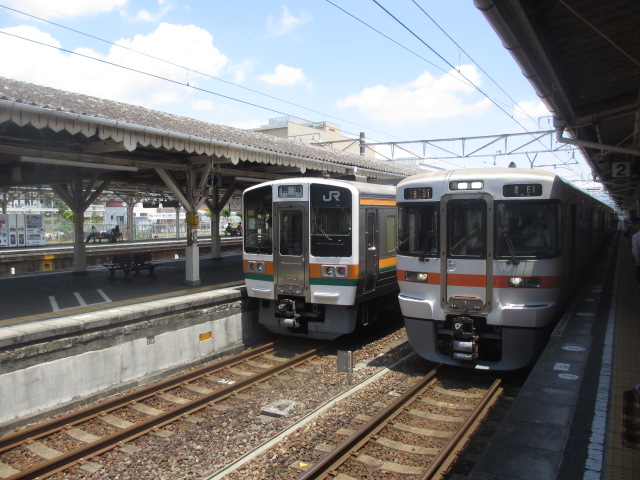
The platforms

Numazu Station has three ground-level island platforms serving six tracks, connected to each other and to the station building by both a footbridge and an underpass. The station building has automated ticket machines, TOICA automated turnstiles and a "JR Ticket office" staffed ticket office.

=== Platforms ===
1/2	■ Tōkaidō Main Line	for Fuji, Shizuoka, Hamamatsu, and Toyohashi
3	■ Tōkaidō Main Line	for Mishima, Atami, Odawara, Yokohama, and Tokyo Tōhoku Main Line through to Utsunomiya
4	■ Tōkaidō Main Line	for Mishima, Atami
5	■ Gotemba Line	for Gotemba, Matsuda, and Kōzu
6	■ Tōkaidō Main Line	for Mishima, Atami, Odawara, Yokohama, and Tokyo Tōhoku Main Line through to Utsunomiya

== History ==
Numazu Station opened on February 1, 1889, when the section of the Tōkaidō Main Line connecting Shizuoka with Kōzu was completed. A spur line to nearby Numazu Port was established in 1899. The first station building burned down in a fire of 1913 and the second in a fire of 1926. On December 1, 1934, Numazu was connected directly with Atami Station via the Tanna Tunnel, thus eliminating the previous long detour north to Gotemba Station in the section between Tokyo and Shizuoka. Numazu Station was rebuilt in 1937, but was burned down again, this time in the Bombing of Numazu in World War II. The next station building was erected in 1953, and rebuilt in 1973.

Station numbering was introduced to this station in 2018; Numazu Station was assigned station numbers CA04 for the Tōkaidō Line and CB18 for the Gotemba Line.

== Bus terminals ==
=== Highway buses (north exit) ===
- Airport Liousine; For Narita International Airport (Fujikyu Shizuoka Bus, Keisei Bus)
- Sansan Numazu Tokyo; For Kasumigaseki Station, Tokyo Station (Fujikyu City Bus)
- Sansan Numazu Shinjuku / Mishima Croquette; For Shibuya Station, Shinjuku Station (Keio Bus East, Fujikyu City Bus)
- Kintaro; For Kyōto Station, Ōsaka Station, Ōsaka Namba Station, Ōsaka Abenobashi Station (Fujikyu Shonan Bus, Kintetsu Bus)
- Hakata Fujiyama Express; For Kokura Station, Nishitetsu Fukuoka (Tenjin) Station, Hakata Station (Fujikyu Yamanashi Bus, Nishi-Nippon Railroad)

== Passenger statistics ==
In fiscal 2017, the station was used by an average of 20,941 passengers daily (boarding passengers only).

== Surrounding area ==
Numazu Station is located in central Numazu city.

== See also ==
- List of railway stations in Japan
