= Ōiso Station =

Railway station in Ōiso, Kanagawa Prefecture, Japan

JT12 Ōiso Station 大磯駅
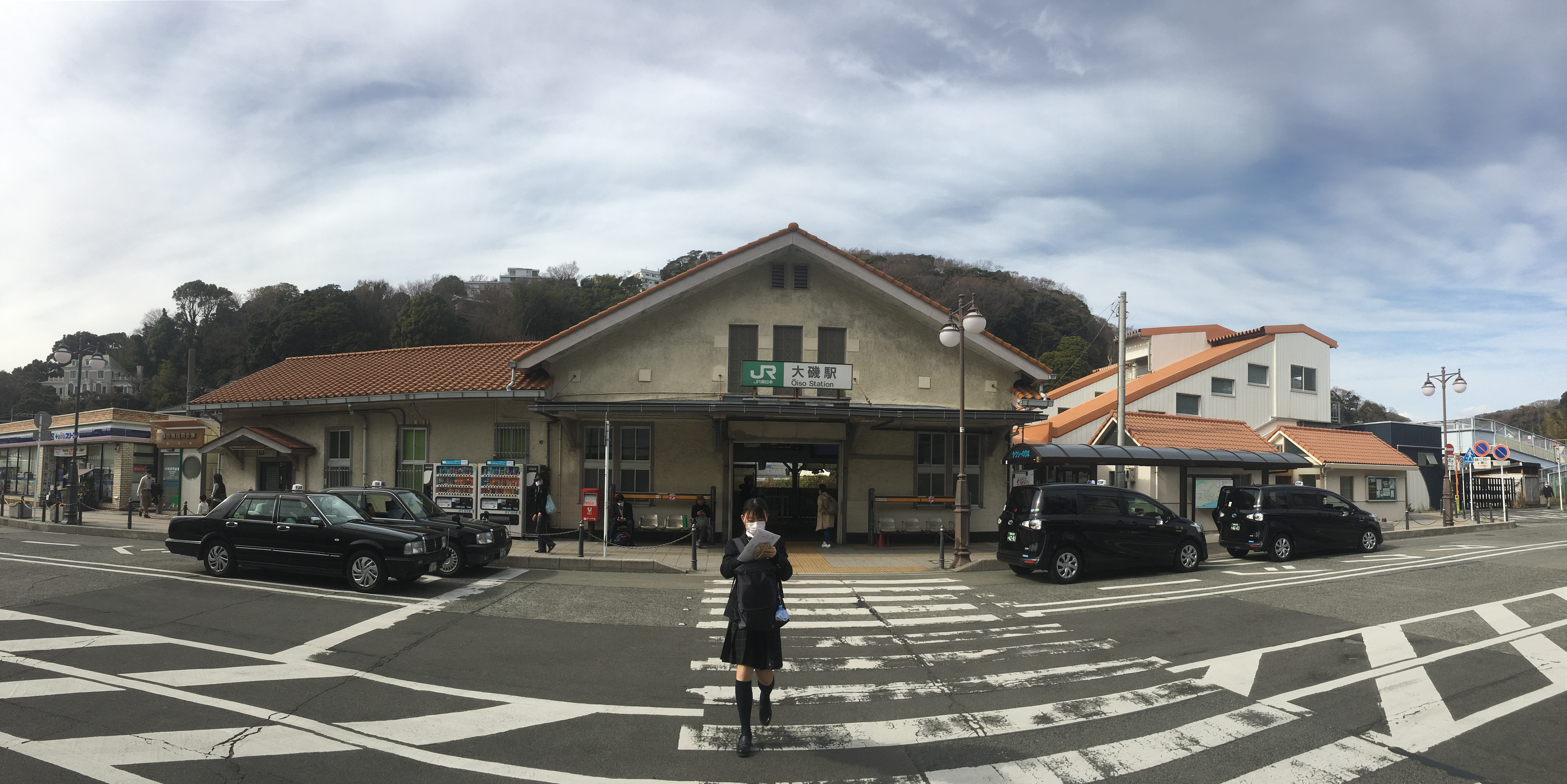
- Ōiso Station in March 2021

General information
- Location: Higashi-Koiso, Ōiso-machi, Naka-gun, Kanagawa-ken 255-0003; Japan
- Coordinates: 35°18′40.4″N 139°18′48.6″E
- Operator: JR East
- Line: ■ Tōkaidō Main Line
- Distance: 67.8 km from Tokyo.
- Platforms: 1 island platform
- Connections: Bus terminal

Other information
- Status: Staffed (Midori no Madoguchi)
- Station code: JT12
- Website: Official website

History
- Opened: July 11, 1887

Passengers
- FY2019: 8,053 daily

Services
Preceding station	JR East	Following station
Ninomiya JT13 towards Atami	Tōkaidō Line	Hiratsuka JT11 towards Tokyo
Ninomiya JT13 towards Odawara	Shōnan–Shinjuku Line Rapid	Hiratsuka JT11 towards Maebashi
Location
- Location within Kanagawa Prefecture Location within Japan

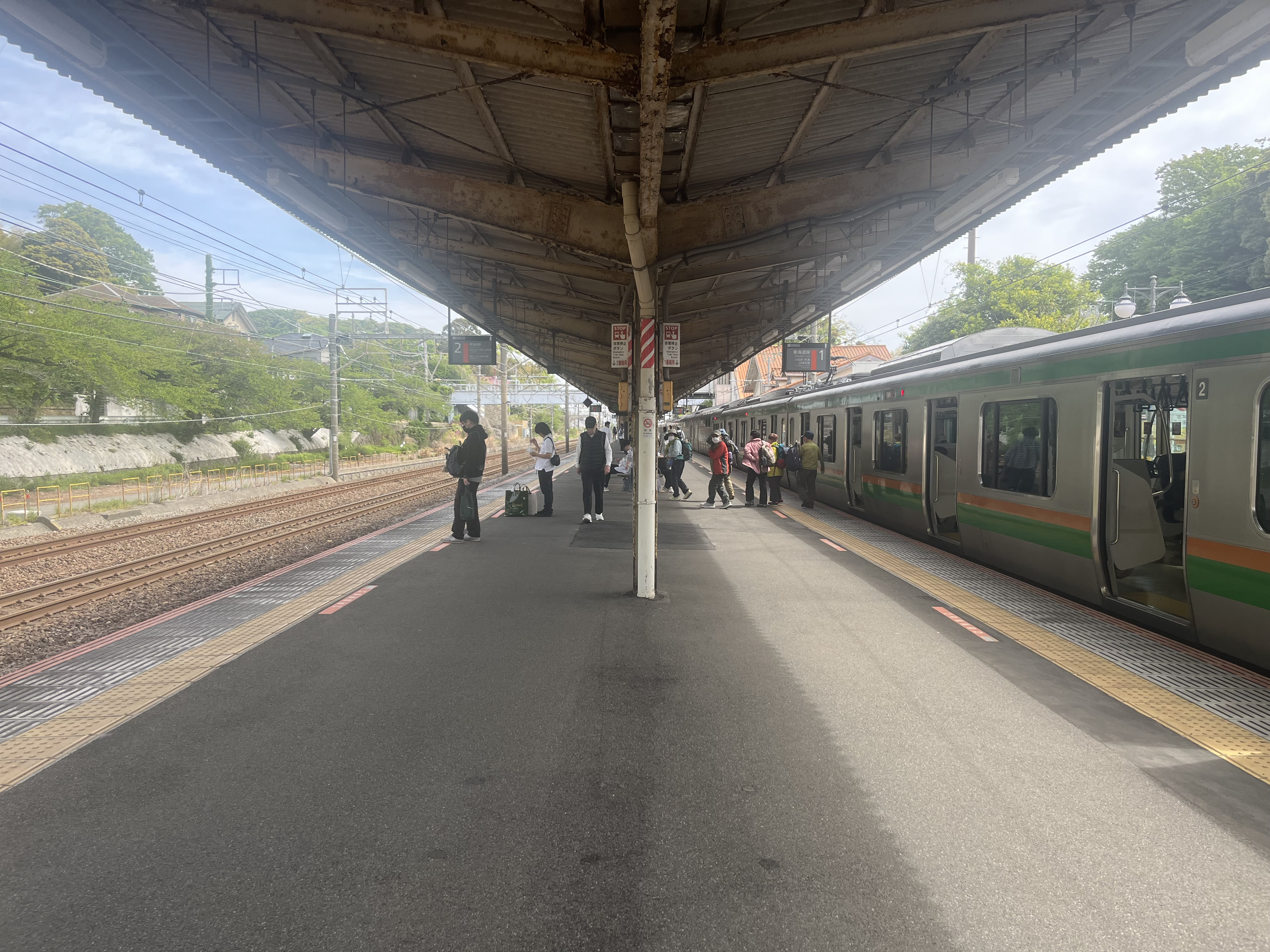
Platforms, 2026

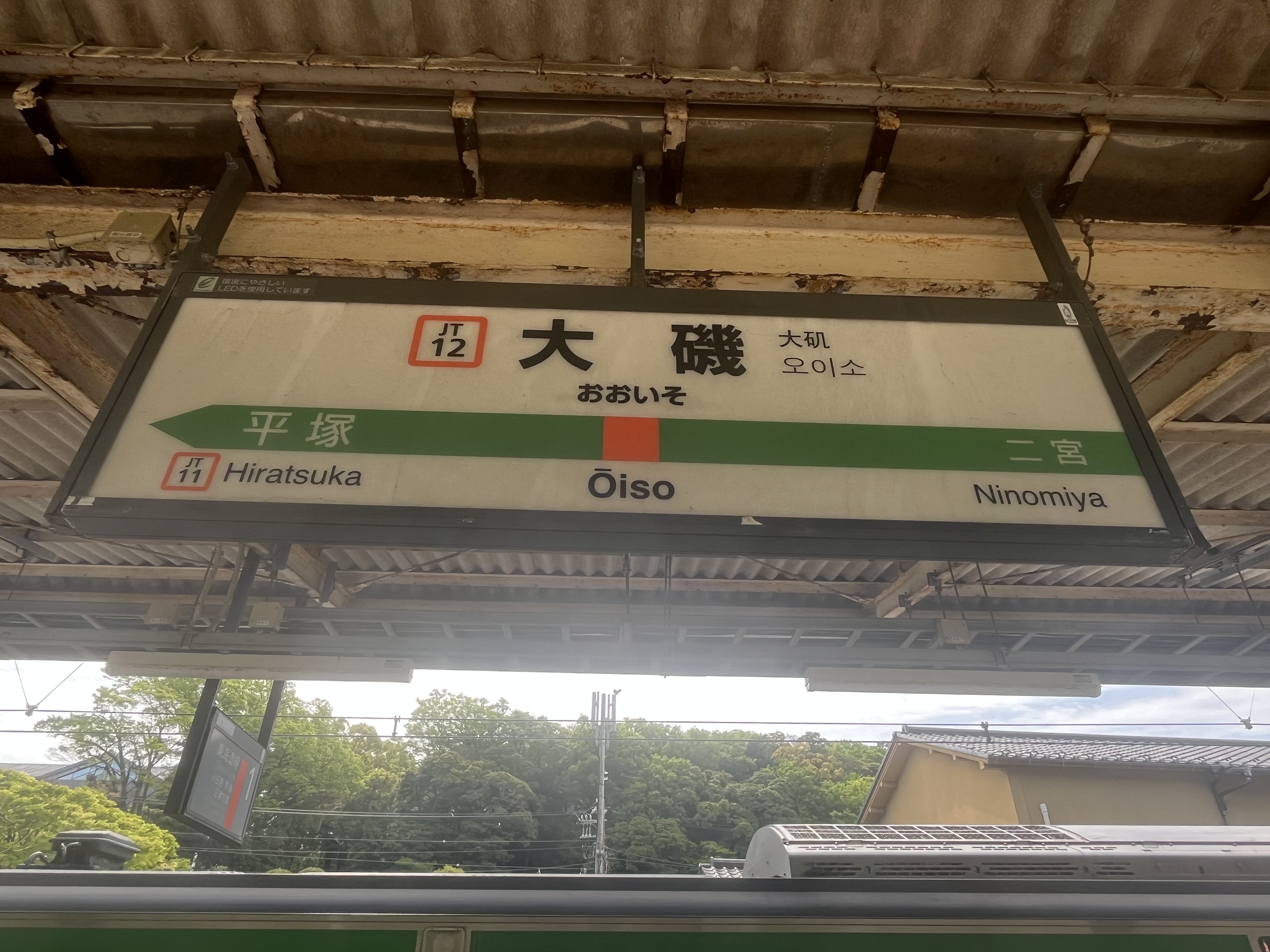
Station sign

Ōiso Station (大磯駅, Ōiso-eki) is a passenger railway station located in the town of Ōiso, Kanagawa Prefecture, Japan, operated by the East Japan Railway Company (JR East).

== Lines ==
Ōiso Station is served by the Tōkaidō Main Line, with some through services via the Shōnan-Shinjuku Line. The station is 67.8 km (42.1 mi) from Tokyo Station.

== Station layout ==
The station has a single island platform serving two tracks, connected to the station building by a footbridge. The station has a Midori no Madoguchi staffed ticket office.

=== Platforms ===
1	Tōkaidō Line	for Kōzu, Odawara, Atami, Numazu; Itō Line for Itō
2	Tokaido Line (Ueno-Tokyo Line)	for Hiratsuka, Yokohama, Tokyo, Ueno, Ōmiya; Utsunomiya Line for Utsunomiya and Kuroiso; Takasaki Line for Takasaki and Maebashi
2	Shōnan-Shinjuku Line	for Yokohama, Shibuya, Shinjuku, Ikebukuro, Ōmiya, Takasaki and Maebashi (via Takasaki Line)

== History ==
Ōiso Station opened on July 11, 1887 on the Tokaido Main Line of the Japanese Government Railways (JGR). With the dissolution and privatization of the Japanese National Railways (successor of JGR) on April 1, 1987, the station came under the control of JR East. Automated turnstiles using the Suica IC Card system came into operation from November 18, 2001.

== Passenger statistics ==
In fiscal 2019, the station was used by an average of 8,053 passengers daily (boarding passengers only).

The passenger figures (boarding passengers only) for previous years are as shown below.

Fiscal year	daily average
2005	7,282
2010	7,564
2015	8,033

== Surrounding area ==
- Oiso Beach
- Oiso Long Beach, outdoor swimming pool resort
- Kanagawa Prefectural Oiso High School
- National Route 1

== See also ==
- List of railway stations in Japan
