= Tōkaidō Line (JR East) =

Japanese medium-distance train service

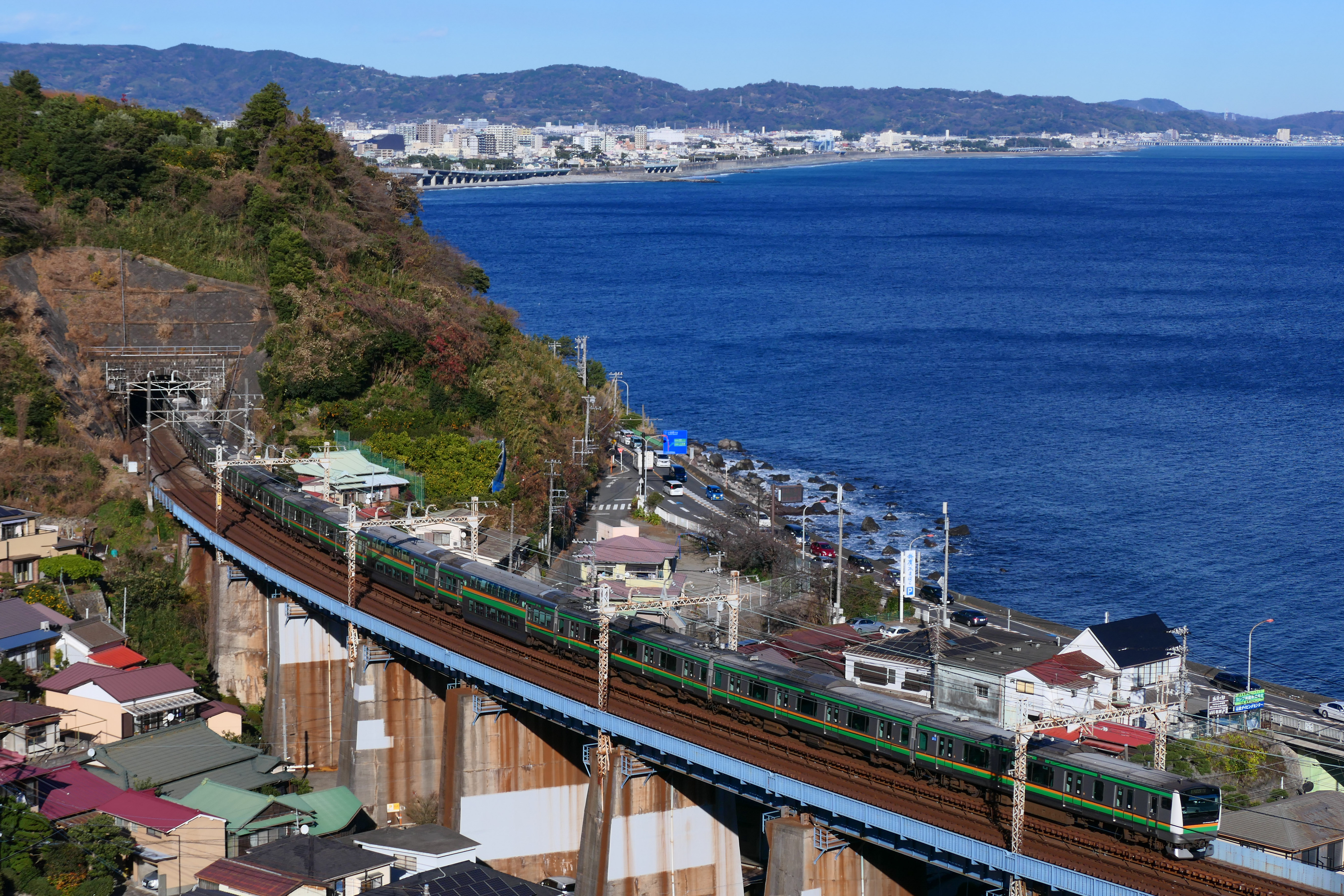

Overview
- Other names: Shōnan–Shinjuku Line; Ueno–Tokyo Line
- Native name: 東海道線
- Owner: East Japan Railway Company
- Line number: JO
- Locale: Kantō
- Termini: Atami; Tokyo
- Stations: 21
- Color on map: Orange

Service
- Rolling stock: E231-1000, E233-3000

History
- Opened: 14 October 1872; 153 years ago

Technical
- Track length: 104.6 km (65.0 mi)
- Track gauge: 1,067 mm (3 ft 6 in)
- Electrification: Overhead line, 1,500 V DC
- Operating speed: 120 km/h (75 mph)

The Tōkaidō Line (Japanese: 東海道線, romanized: Tōkaidō-sen) is a medium-distance train service operated by JR East on the Tōkaidō Main Line between Tokyo Station and Atami Station. It used to be called the "Shōnan Train".

== Overview ==
The line color for the Tōkaidō Line is orange, and is used on the body of the trains. When the line was operated by Japan National Railways (JNR), the term "Shonan Tram" was used in passenger information to refer to regular trains in this section. The route symbol used in station numbering is JT. The Tōkaidō Line runs from Tokyo, through Kanagawa prefecture, and into Shizuoka prefecture. The termini of the line are Tokyo station at the Tokyo end, and Atami station at the Shizuoka end.

== Operations ==
Formerly operated almost entirely to and from Tokyo Station, since the December 1, 2001, revision, the Shonan Shinjuku Line has operated directly to the Takasaki Line via the Yokosuka Line tracks and Shinjuku Station on the Yamanote Freight Line. Since the 2015 revision on March 14, a rail was built from Tokyo Station to Ueno Station, which was the starting station for the Utsunomiya Line, Takasaki Line, and Joban Line. Through this rail, direct operation with the three aforementioned lines started as the Ueno–Tokyo Line.

Tōkaidō Line trains run on a dedicated double track (train rail) between Tokyo Station and Ofuna Station. The line has fewer stations with platforms than the parallel Yamanote Line and Keihin-Tōhoku Line and the Yokosuka Line, and in this section, trains, including regular trains, effectively play the role of express transport. The Shonan Shinjuku Line operates on the Yokosuka Line tracks from Osaki Station on the Yamanote Freight Line to Totsuka Station via a connecting line (Osaki Branch Line), but on this line, trains directly connected to the Tokaido Line and Takasaki Line only stop at Yokohama Station and Musashi Kosugi Station. The line is also separated from the Tokaido Freight Line between Tokyo Station and Odawara Station, where freight trains run, so that a large number of passenger trains can be operated without being affected by the freight train schedule.

=== Train schedule ===
The Ueno Tokyo Line and trains to/from Tokyo Station (and southward) are mainly "Local" trains that stop at stations on the Tōkaidō Line. The Shōnan Shinjuku Line offers two types of trains on the Tōkaidō Line: Special Rapid trains (rapid service west of Totsuka Station) and Rapid trains (stopping at every station west of Totsuka Station). Most trains connect directly with the Utsunomiya and Takasaki Lines for Akabane Station, Urawa Station, and Ōmiya Station via Ueno Station or Shinjuku Station, and the Tōkaidō Line (〈Tsurumi Station -〉 Yokohama Station – Ōfuna Station) and the Utsunomiya Line (Akabane Station – Ōmiya Station) are almost integrated as an operation system (this article will not cover this in detail). (Including the Yokosuka Line system of the Shōnan Shinjuku Line, which is not detailed in this article.)

During daytime hours, except for limited express trains, no trains start or end at Tokyo Station, and the Ueno Tokyo Line (excluding trains directly connected to the Joban Line) operates six Local trains per hour. Three trains each directly connect to the Utsunomiya Line and the Takasaki Line. Downbound trains are now departing every 10 minutes, continuing the timetable established in the March 3, 1986, revision. For the up trains as well, the trains arriving at Tokyo Station have been scheduled at approximately 10-minute intervals since the March 14, 2015, revision. The Shōnan Shinjuku Line operates one special rapid and one rapid train per hour, and the total number of trains per hour during the day, excluding limited expresses on the Tōkaidō Line, is six between Tokyo Station and Yokohama Station and Totsuka Station, eight between Totsuka Station and Hiratsuka Station, five between Hiratsuka Station and Kōzu Station and Odawara Station, and three between Odawara Station and Atami Station.

== Lines sharing sections ==
The Tōkaidō Line is one of JR East's services operating on the Tōkaidō Main Line. Others include the Yamanote Line (between Tokyo Station and Shinagawa Station) and the Keihin–Tōhoku Line (between Tokyo Station and Yokohama Station). The Tōkaidō Line runs parallel to these two services and their sections. In the parallel section, the Keihin–Tōhoku Line and the Yamanote Line mainly provide all-station stops and short-distance transportation services, while the Tōkaidō Line provides rapid and medium-distance transportation services, including local trains. The Yokosuka Line, which also runs parallel to the Tōkaidō Line, provides all-station stop service between Totsuka Station and Yokohama Station, while the Tōkaidō Line provides rapid service on this section. The Tōkaidō Line runs on the Tōkaidō Main Line's train rails, while the Yamanote Line (between Tokyo Station and Shinagawa Station) and Keihin-Tōhoku Line (between Tokyo Station and Yokohama Station) run on the Tokaido Main Line's electric train rails, and the Yokosuka Line runs on its own dedicated rails.

Train rail has fewer station platforms, whereas electric train rail has more station platforms. The Tōkaidō Line is in competition with the Keikyu Main Line, which runs parallel to the Tokaido Line between Shinagawa Station and Yokohama Station. As the oldest trunk line in Japan, factories and residential areas were developed along the line early on, and the urban area extends continuously from Tokyo Station to Odawara Station, which is over 80 km away. Some trains also run directly to Numazu Station via a section of the Tōkaidō Main Line operated by Central Japan Railway Company (JR Central). The line is a commuter route from cities along the line to central Tokyo, and the "Odoriko" and "Saphir Odoriko" express trains connect the Kanto region and the Izu Peninsula directly to the Ito Line and Izu Kyuko Line. The "Sunrise Seto/Izumo", a limited express overnight sleeping car train service Tokyo and the Chugoku and Shikoku regions, which is now the only regular overnight train on the JR Lines.

In the 21st century, the Shōnan–Shinjuku Line began direct service with the Takasaki Line via Shinjuku Station in 2001, and the Ueno Tokyo Line began direct service with the Tohoku Main Line (Utsunomiya Line), Takasaki Line, and Joban Line from Tokyo to the northern Kanto region in 2015 .(The Ueno–Tokyo Line on the Joban Line stops at Shinagawa Station).

== Commuter services ==
With morning rush hour passengers accounting for half of the total number of daily regular train passengers (as of 1989), and with intensifying congestion due to the increase in long-distance commuters, JR East has been focusing on improving rush-hour transportation. Efforts have been made to alleviate congestion by increasing the number of commuter liners (the current Limited express "Shōnan") that make effective use of the Tōkaidō Freight Line, improving seating service by connecting double-decker green cars, increasing train length by forming 15-car trains, increasing capacity by making seats longer and introducing 4-door standard cars.

== History ==
- 1950:
  - March 1: 80 series "Shōnan Train" started operation between Tokyo Station and Numazu Station.
  - July: "Shōnan Train" operation section was extended to Shizuoka Station.
- February 15, 1951: "Shōnan Train" operation section is extended to Hamamatsu Station.
- November 1958: 153 series (originally 91 series), the successor to 80 series, begins operation. When it first appeared, it was called the "New Shōnan type".
- September 1962: Started operation of 111 series.
- 1964: Operation of 113 series, a power-enhanced version of 111 series, began. At this time, there were about two regular trains per hour connecting Tokyo Station to Hiratsuka, Odawara, and Atami Stations for short distances, Ito, Numazu, and Shizuoka Stations for medium distances, and Hamamatsu, Toyohashi, Nagoya, Maibara, and Ogaki Stations for long distances, and about three honor trains per hour connecting various regions.
- October 1968: Local train operation by passenger cars ended and all local trains were replaced by electric trains.
- March 15, 1972: Daytime regular trains between Tokyo Station and Maibarara Station, Ogaki Station, and Toyohashi Station were subdivided. The service section of daytime local trains departing from and arriving at Tokyo Station was shortened to Hamamatsu Station.
- 1973: Direct trains on the Takasaki Line (via Tokyo Station) were discontinued. It operated between Maebashi Station – Tokyo Station – Numazu Station and Fuji Station on the Ryomo Line, etc., initially with passenger cars and later with 115 series (regular cars only).
- March 28, 1977: Operation of 80 series was terminated.
- Until 1970s, unlike today, Tōkaido Line trains (Shōnan trains) and Yokosuka Line trains had shared the same track between Tokyo Station and Ofuna Station. Tōkaido Line trains had passed through Totsuka Station. In addition, during the morning rush hour, up trains also had passed through Kawasaki Station to prevent train delays due to congestion. During the morning rush hour, the ratio of the number of trains on the Tōkaido Line and Yokosuka Line in the up direction was roughly 2:1, and the two lines together operated at 3-minute intervals. During the daytime, there were three regular trains per hour on the Tokaido Line to and from Tokyo Station.
- October 1, 1980: Yokosuka Line trains were routed via the underground line (between Tokyo and Shinagawa Stations) and a branch line, the Hinkaku Line (Shinagawa – Shin-Kawasaki – Tsurumi Stations), completely separating the line from the Tōkaido Line trains (SM separation). Totsuka Station is added as a stop for Tōkaido Line local trains. During the morning rush hour, all up local trains will stop at Kawasaki Station, and the interval between trains will be about every 4 minutes. Daytime regular trains to and from Tokyo Station are increased to 4 trains per hour.
- October 1, 1981: The morning rush hour up trains were increased to approximately every 3 minutes. During the daytime, about one rapid train per hour was set up as an extra train, mainly on holidays.
- February 14, 1983: 153 series was discontinued. The 165 series, which was mixed with the same series, remained in service until March 16, 1996.
- 1986:
  - March 3: The 211 series began operation. Daytime trains to and from Tokyo Station were increased to 6 trains per hour and every 10 minutes.
  - November 1: The last major timetable revision by JNR took place. The Shōnan Liner service was newly established between Tokyo and Odawara Stations. Initially, there were two up trains and four down trains.
- April 1, 1987: With the privatization of Japan National Railways (JNR), the line between Tokyo Station and Atami Station was taken over by East Japan Railway Company (JR East). The line west of Atami Station became under the jurisdiction of Central Japan Railway Company (JR Central), and the line became a mutual transit system after Atami Station.
- 1988:
  - March 13: The longest direct daytime local train service to JR Central (Shizuoka block) was extended to Shizuoka Station for down trains and to Shimada Station for up trains, and the direct service to Hamamatsu Station was discontinued.
  - July 6: "Shōnan Shinjuku Liner" was newly established.
- 1989:
  - February 2: 113 series and 211 series double-decker green cars started operation.
  - March 11, 1990: The rapid "Acty" began operation, with 11 round trips per day.
- March 10, 1990: The nighttime downhill "Acty" rapid was changed to a commuter rapid with no stops between Shinagawa and Ofuna. New trains starting from Yokohama were added at night.
- March 14, 1992: The 215 series was introduced and began operation on the "Shōnan Liner" and rapid "Acty" trains.
- 1993:
  - October 31: The security system between Tokyo and Ofuna Stations was changed to ATS-P.
  - December 1: The 215 series trains were added to the fleet. The rapid "Acty" service was increased to 9 down trains, 13 up trains on weekdays, and 15 up trains on holidays, of which 7 round trips were operated by the 215 series. A dedicated platform for liners was installed on the freight line at Fujisawa Station.
- 1994:
  - February 27: The security device between Ofuna and Odawara Stations was changed to ATS-P.
  - December 3, 1997: A dedicated platform for Liner trains was also installed at Chigasaki Station.
  - March 22, 1997: The timetable of down trains between 8:00 p.m. and 11:00 p.m. was patterned.
- March 14, 1998: With the restoration of the two-sided four-lane Tokaido Line platform at Tokyo Station following the completion of the Hokuriku Shinkansen boarding work and the introduction of ATS-P, additional trains were made possible, and two up trains were set to depart from Ninomiya Station during morning rush hours. Some of the rapid "Acty" trains started stopping at Hayakawa and Nebukawa Stations. In addition, "Holiday Rapid View Shonan" trains departing from and arriving at Shinjuku Station were set up as extra trains on holidays.
- December 1, 2001: The Shōnan–Shinjuku Line started operation during the daytime, directly connecting to the Takasaki Line via Shinjuku Station. The 211 series, E231 series, and 215 series trains were used (except for the 215 series, which were not coupled with green cars). Meanwhile, the number of trains to and from Tokyo Station was reduced from seven to six per hour. Operation of the 215 series on the rapid "Acty" service was terminated.
- December 1, 2002: The operating hours of the Shōnan–Shinjuku Line were expanded to morning and evening. With this change, "Shonan Shinjuku Liner" was renamed "Ohayou Liner Shinjuku" and "Home Liner Odawara".
- October 16, 2004: The Shōnan–Shinjuku Line was increased, and "Special Rapid" and "Rapid" trains were set up on the Tokaido Line during the daytime, one per hour respectively. E231 series trains for the Tokaido Line (belonging to the Kōzu Vehicle Center and coupled with green cars) began operation. All trains on the Shōnan–Shinjuku Line are now of the same series, and the maximum speed is increased from 100 km/h to 120 km/h. At the same time, the green car Suica system service was started. All trains of the rapid "Acty" service stopped at each station between Odawara and Atami stations; direct service with JR Central (Shizuoka Block) became only morning, evening, and night service, and the direct section was reduced to Numazu Station, except for one round trip to/from Shizuoka.
- March 17, 2006: Operation of the 113 series was terminated. E217 series trains converted from the Yokosuka and Sobu Rapid Line started operation.
- March 18, 2007: All trains of the rapid "Acty" started stopping at Totsuka Station.
- 2008: E233 series trains started operation.
- March 13, 2010: With the opening of Musashi Kosugi Station on the Yokosuka Line, all trains of the Shōnan–Shinjuku Line started stopping at the station.
- June 24 – September 9, 2011: Due to the power shortage caused by the Great East Japan Earthquake that occurred on March 11, 2011, a special power-saving schedule was implemented during weekdays. The operation of the rapid "Acty" has been cancelled, except for some parts.
- 2012.
  - March 17: Local trains between Tokyo Station and Shizuoka Station by JR Central's 373 series were discontinued. Direct service to the Gotemba Line was discontinued.
  - April: Operation of the 211 series was terminated.
- 2013.
  - March 16: Local trains operated by spacing operation of 185 series were replaced by E231 series. As a result, all local trains are now equipped with 4-door cars.
  - August 19: Semi-automatic doors began year-round operation for the first trains at Tokyo, Shinagawa, Odawara, and Atami stations.
- March 14, 2015: With the opening of the Ueno Tokyo Line, trains to and from Tokyo Station began direct service with the Utsunomiya and Takasaki Lines. The Joban Line trains also started boarding at Shinagawa Station, and the E217 series trains were no longer operated on the Tokaido Line.
- October 1, 2016: Station numbering was introduced between Tokyo Station and Ofuna Station. The route symbol is JT.
- November 2018: Fujisawa Station – Atami Station was added to the section subject to station numbering.
- March 13, 2021: "Shōnan Liner", "Ohayo Liner Shinjuku", and "Home Liner Odawara" were discontinued, and the limited express "Shōnan" started operation. The rapid "Acty" was changed to operate only between Tokyo Station and Odawara Station on down trains at night, and its direct connection with the Utsunomiya Line was discontinued. South of Hiratsuka Station, service will be reduced. The rapid "Acty" trains at other times are changed to local trains. The commuter rapid service has been discontinued.
- March 18, 2023: Of the two rapid "Acty" trains that had been in service since the March 13, 2021, timetable revision, one has been replaced by a local train and the other has been discontinued.

== Station list ==
Legend:

- Only stations with station platforms on the train rail are listed.
- Local, Rapid Rabbit and Urban trains stop at all stations.
- ●: All trains stop
- ｜: All trains pass
- ▲: Shōnan–Shinjuku Line trains use Yokosuka Line platforms

No.	Station	Distance in km (mi)		Jōban Line	Shōnan–Shinjuku Line		Transfers	Location	
No.	Station	Between stations	Total	Jōban Line	Rapid	Special Rapid	Transfers	Location	
↑ Local, Rapid Rabbit and Urban trains operate through-service to/from Ueno–Tokyo, Utsunomiya & Takasaki lines ↑
	Tokyo 東京	—N/a	0 (0)	●			Tokaido Shinkansen; Tōhoku Shinkansen (Hokkaido, Akita, Yamagata); Jōetsu Shinkansen; Hokuriku Shinkansen; Yamanote Line (JY01); Keihin–Tōhoku Line (JK26); Chūō Line (JC01); Ueno–Tokyo Line (JU01); Yokosuka Line/Sōbu Line (JO19); Keiyō Line (JE01); Marunouchi Line (M-17)	Chiyoda	Tokyo
	Shimbashi 新橋	1.9 (1.2)	1.9 (1.2)	●			Yamanote Line (JY29); Keihin–Tōhoku Line (JK24); Yokosuka Line (JO18); Ginza Line (G-08); Asakusa Line (A-10); Yurikamome (U-01)	Minato	Tokyo
	Shinagawa 品川	4.7 (2.9)	6.8 (4.2)	●			Tokaido Shinkansen; Yamanote Line (JY25); Keihin–Tōhoku Line (JK20); Yokosuka Line (JO17); Main Line (KK01)	Minato	Tokyo
	Kawasaki 川崎	11.4 (7.1)	18.2 (11.3)				Keihin–Tōhoku Line (JK16); Nambu Line (JN01); Main Line (Keikyū Kawasaki: KK20); Daishi Line (Keikyū Kawasaki: KK20)	Kawasaki-ku, Kawasaki	Kanagawa
	Yokohama 横浜	10.6 (6.6)	28.8 (17.9)		▲	▲	Keihin–Tōhoku Line (JK12); Yokohama Line (JK12); Negishi Line (JK12); Yokosuka Line (JO13); Shōnan–Shinjuku Line (JS13); Main Line (KK37); Sōtetsu Main Line (SO01); Tōyoko Line (TY21); Minatomirai Line (MM01); Blue Line (B20)	Nishi-ku, Yokohama	Kanagawa
	Totsuka 戸塚	12.1 (7.5)	40.9 (25.4)		▲	▲	Yokosuka Line (JO10); Shōnan–Shinjuku Line (JS10); Blue Line (B06)	Totsuka-ku, Yokohama	Kanagawa
	Ōfuna 大船	5.6 (3.5)	46.5 (28.9)		●	●	Keihin–Tōhoku Line (JK01); Yokosuka Line (JO09); Shōnan–Shinjuku Line (JS09); Shonan Monorail (SMR1)	Sakae-ku, Yokohama	Kanagawa
	Ōfuna 大船	5.6 (3.5)	46.5 (28.9)		●	●	Keihin–Tōhoku Line (JK01); Yokosuka Line (JO09); Shōnan–Shinjuku Line (JS09); Shonan Monorail (SMR1)	Kamakura	Kanagawa
JT08	Fujisawa 藤沢	4.6 (2.9)	51.1 (31.8)		●	●	Enoshima Line (OE13); Enoden (EN01)	Fujisawa	Kanagawa
JT09	Tsujidō 辻堂	3.7 (2.3)	54.8 (34.1)		●	｜		Fujisawa	Kanagawa
JT10	Chigasaki 茅ヶ崎	3.8 (2.4)	58.6 (36.4)		●	●	■ Sagami Line	Chigasaki	Kanagawa
JT11	Hiratsuka 平塚	5.2 (3.2)	63.8 (39.6)		●	●		Hiratsuka	Kanagawa
JT12	Ōiso 大磯	4.0 (2.5)	67.8 (42.1)		●	｜		Ōiso, Naka District	Kanagawa
JT13	Ninomiya 二宮	5.3 (3.3)	73.1 (45.4)		●	｜		Ninomiya, Naka District	Kanagawa
JT14	Kōzu 国府津	4.6 (2.9)	77.7 (48.3)		●	●	Gotemba Line (CB00)	Odawara	Kanagawa
JT15	Kamonomiya 鴨宮	3.1 (1.9)	80.8 (50.2)		●	｜		Odawara	Kanagawa
JT16	Odawara 小田原	3.1 (1.9)	83.9 (52.1)		●	●	Tokaido Shinkansen; Odawara Line (OH47); Hakone Tozan Line (OH47); Daiyūzan Line (ID01)	Odawara	Kanagawa
JT17	Hayakawa 早川	2.1 (1.3)	86.0 (53.4)					Odawara	Kanagawa
JT18	Nebukawa 根府川	4.4 (2.7)	90.4 (56.2)					Odawara	Kanagawa
JT19	Manazuru 真鶴	5.4 (3.4)	95.8 (59.5)					Manazuru, Ashigarashimo District	Kanagawa
JT20	Yugawara 湯河原	3.3 (2.1)	99.1 (61.6)					Yugawara, Ashigarashimo District	Kanagawa
JT21	Atami 熱海	5.5 (3.4)	104.6 (65.0)				Tokaido Shinkansen; Tōkaidō Main Line (CA00); Itō Line (JT21; Some through trains for Ito)	Atami	Shizuoka
↓ Some local trains operate through-service to/from Numazu or Ito ↓
