= Ninomiya Station =

Railway station in Ninomiya, Kanagawa Prefecture, Japan

JT13 Ninomiya Station 二宮駅
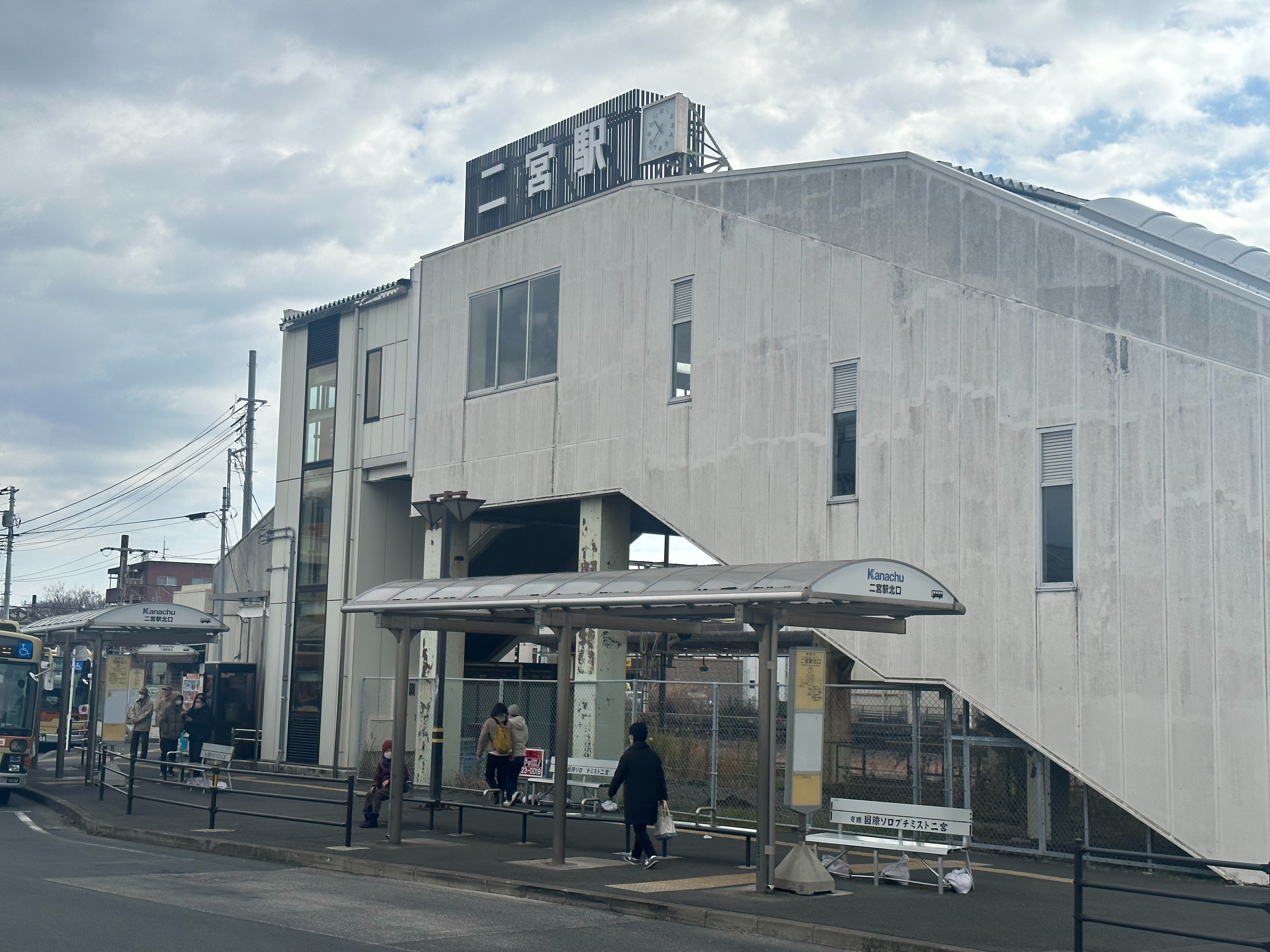
- North Exit of Ninomiya Station, 2024

General information
- Location: Ninomiya 838, Ninomiya-machi, Naka-gun, Kanagawa-ken 259-0123; Japan
- Coordinates: 35°17′56.23″N 139°15′27.73″E
- Operator: JR East
- Line: ■ Tōkaidō Main Line
- Distance: 73.1 km from Tokyo.
- Platforms: 1 island platform
- Connections: Bus terminal

Other information
- Status: Staffed (Midori no Madoguchi)
- Station code: JT13
- Website: Official website

History
- Opened: April 15, 1902

Passengers
- FY2019: 13,165 daily

Services
Preceding station	JR East	Following station
Kōzu JT14 towards Odawara	Shōnan	Hiratsuka JT11 towards Tokyo or Shinjuku
Kōzu JT14 towards Atami	Tōkaidō Line	Ōiso JT12 towards Tokyo
Kōzu JT14 towards Odawara	Shōnan–Shinjuku Line Rapid	Ōiso JT12 towards Maebashi
Location
- Location within Kanagawa Prefecture Location within Japan

Ninomiya Station (二宮駅, Ninomiya-eki) is a passenger railway station located in the town of Ninomiya, Kanagawa Prefecture, Japan, operated by the East Japan Railway Company (JR East).

== Lines ==
Ninomiya Station is served by the Tōkaidō Main Line, and is located 73.1 kilometers from the terminus of the line at Tokyo Station. Trains of the Shōnan-Shinjuku Line also make use of the station.

== Station layout ==
The station consists of a single island platform with an elevated station building built over the tracks and platform. The station has a Midori no Madoguchi staffed ticket office.

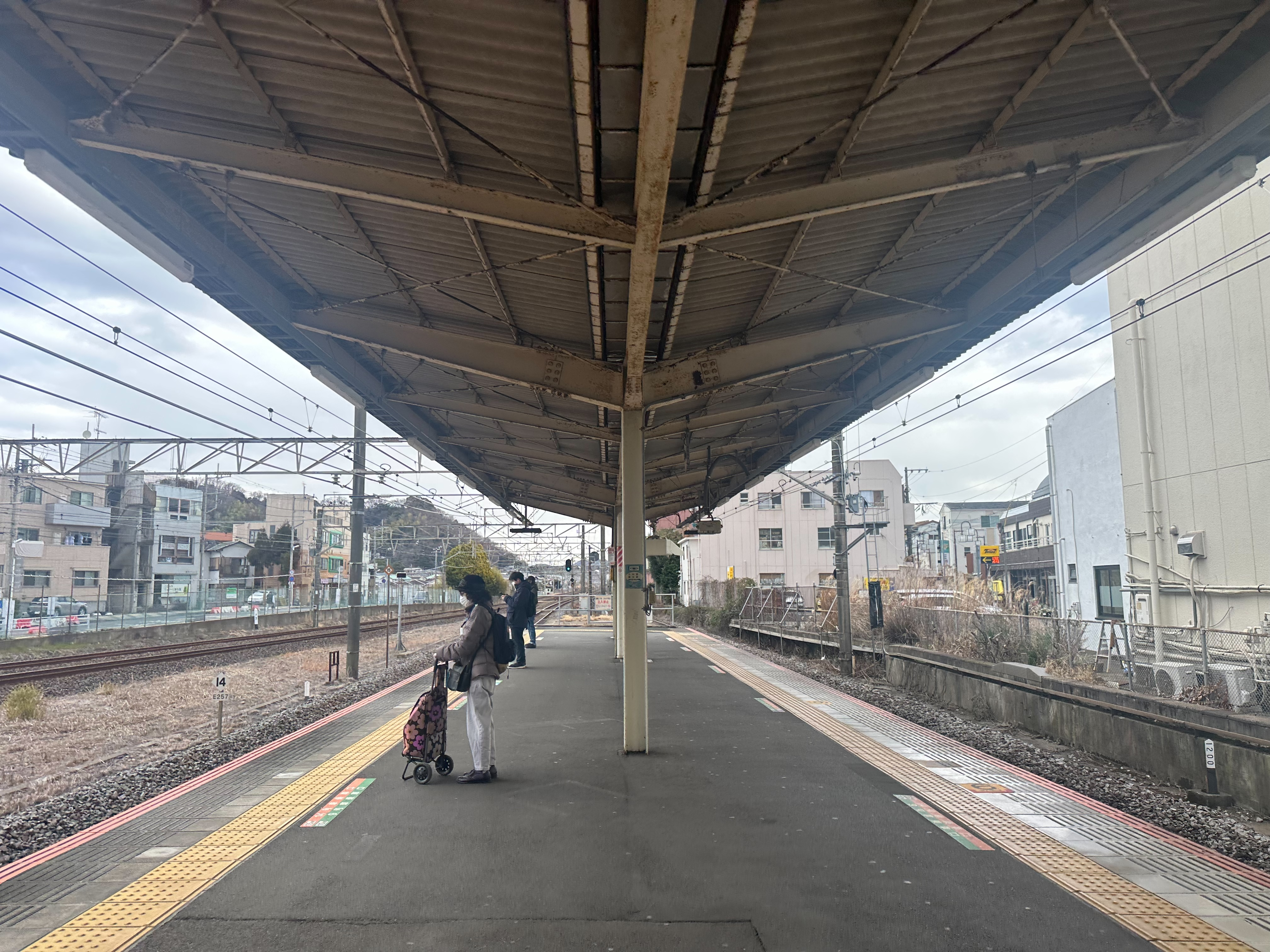
Platform, 2024

== Station layout ==
1	Tōkaidō Line	for Kōzu, Odawara, Atami, Numazu; Itō Line for Itō
2	Tokaido Line (Ueno-Tokyo Line)	for Hiratsuka, Yokohama, Tokyo, Ueno, Ōmiya; Utsunomiya Line for Utsunomiya and Kuroiso; Takasaki Line for Takasaki and Maebashi
2	Shōnan-Shinjuku Line	for Yokohama, Shibuya, Shinjuku, Ikebukuro, Ōmiya, Takasaki and Maebashi (via Takasaki Line)

== Station history ==
Ninomiya Station first opened on April 15, 1902, as a station for both freight and passenger service on the Tōkaidō Main Line. The initial station was destroyed on March 10, 1945, in an American air raid during World War II. Regularly scheduled freight services were discontinued in 1971, and parcel services by 1972. The current station building was completed in October 1982. With the dissolution and privatization of the JNR on April 1, 1987, the station came under the control of the East Japan Railway Company. Automated turnstiles using the Suica IC Card system came into operation from November 18, 2001.

== Passenger statistics ==
In fiscal 2019, the station was used by an average of 13,165 passengers daily (boarding passengers only).

The passenger figures (boarding passengers only) for previous years are as shown below.

Fiscal year	daily average
2005	14,502
2010	14,042
2015	13,712

== Surrounding area ==
- Ninomiya Town Hall
- National Route 1
- Ninomiya High School

== See also ==
- List of railway stations in Japan
