= Hiratsuka Station =

Railway station in Hiratsuka, Kanagawa Prefecture, Japan

JT11 Hiratsuka Station 平塚駅
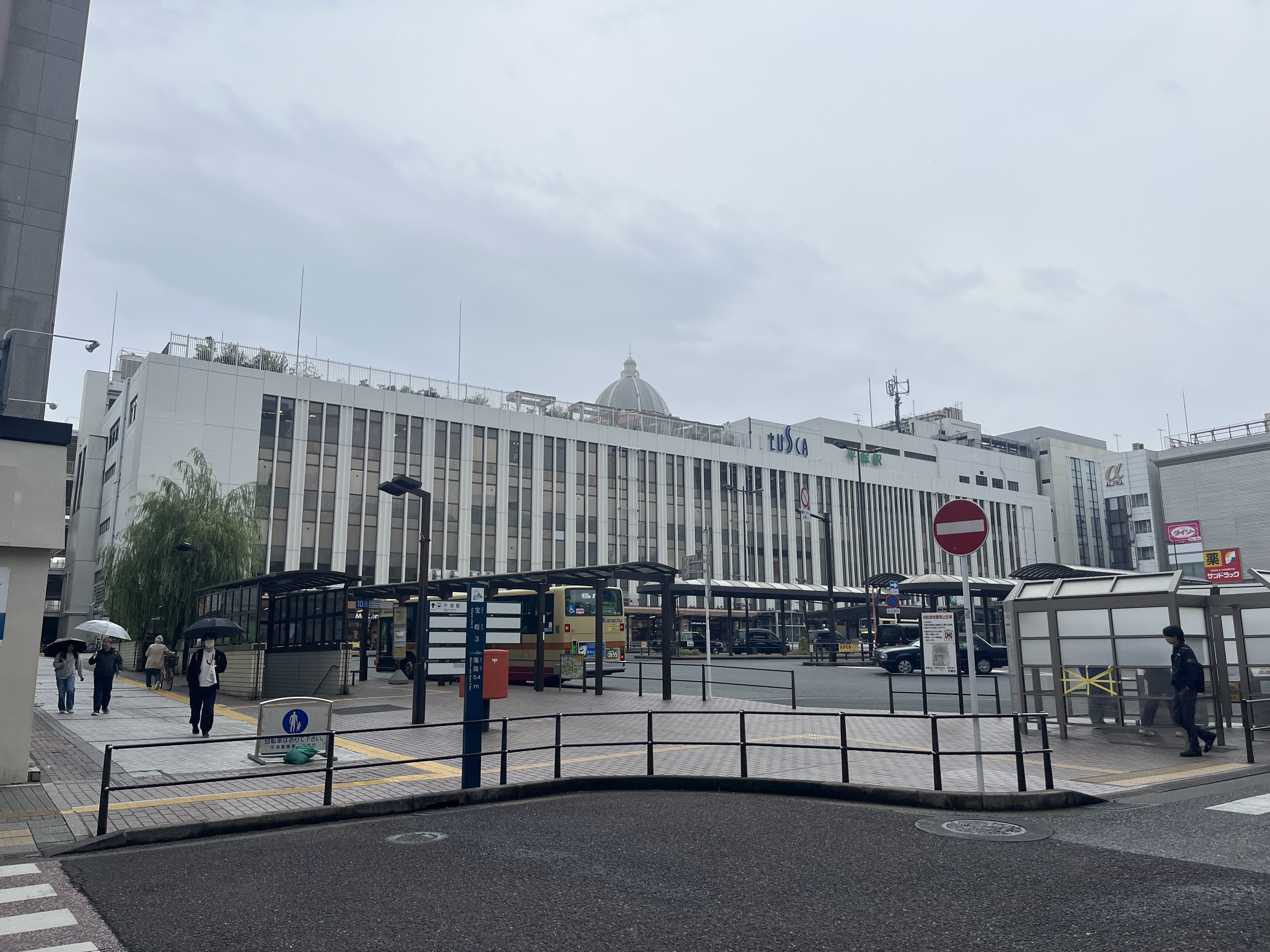
- The north side of Hiratsuka Station, 2025

General information
- Location: 1 Takarachō, Hiratsuka-shi, Kanagawa-ken 254-0034; Japan
- Coordinates: 35°19′40.4″N 139°21′2.1″E
- Operator: JR East
- Line: ■ Tōkaidō Main Line
- Distance: 63.8 km from Tokyo
- Platforms: 2 island platforms
- Connections: Bus terminal

Other information
- Status: Staffed (Midori no Madoguchi)
- Station code: JT11
- Website: Official website

History
- Opened: July 11, 1887

Passengers
- FY2019: 60,941 daily

Services
Preceding station	JR East	Following station
Ninomiya JT13 towards Odawara	Shōnan	Chigasaki JT10 towards Tokyo or Shinjuku
Ōiso JT12 towards Atami	Tōkaidō Line	Chigasaki JT10 towards Tokyo
Kōzu JT14 towards Odawara	Shōnan–Shinjuku Line Special Rapid	Chigasaki JT10 towards Maebashi
Ōiso JT12 towards Odawara	Shōnan–Shinjuku Line Rapid	Chigasaki JT10 towards Maebashi
Location
- Location within Kanagawa Prefecture Location within Japan

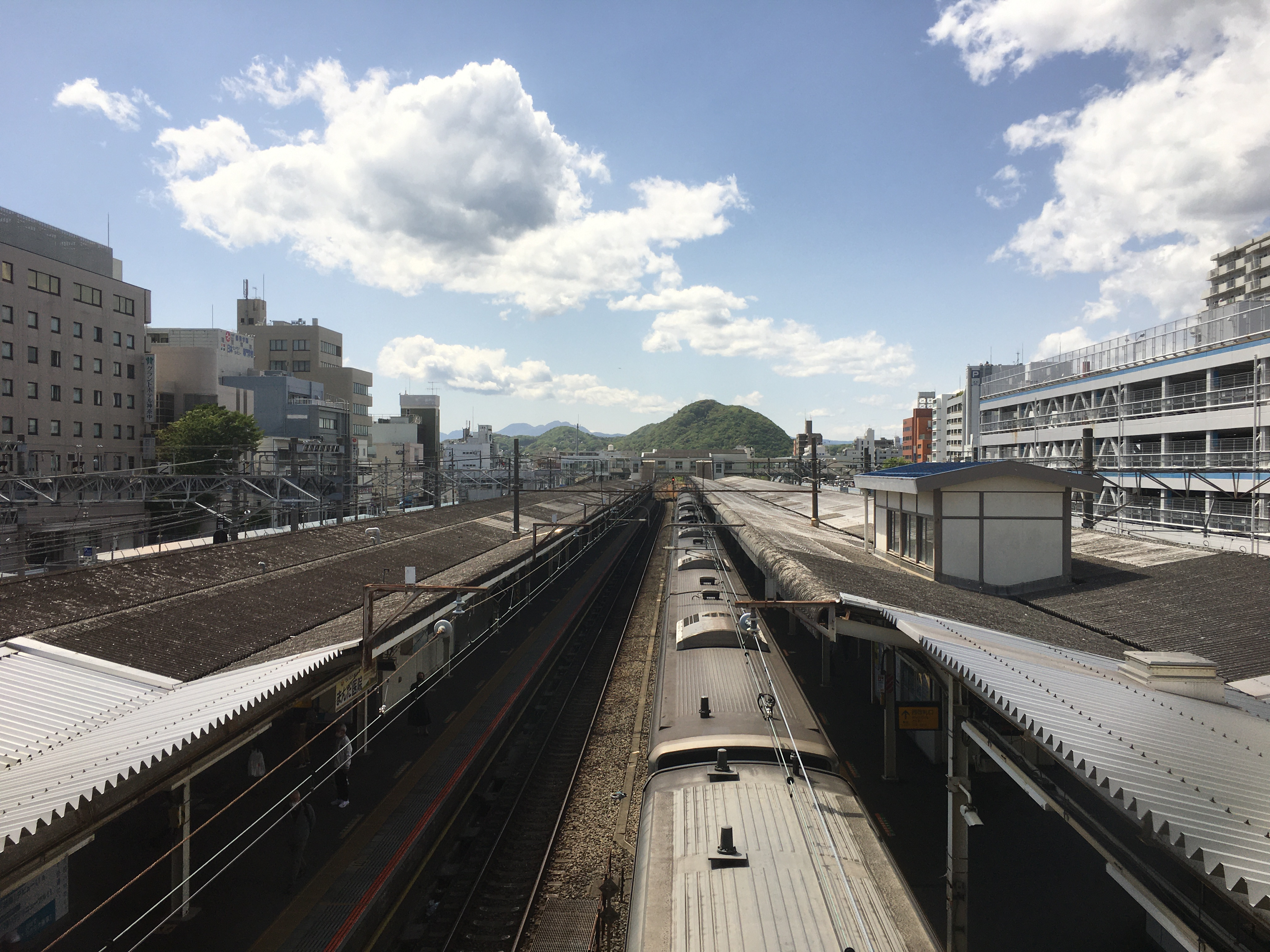
Station platforms from above, 2021

Hiratsuka Station (平塚駅, Hiratsuka-eki) is a passenger railway station located in the city of Hiratsuka, Kanagawa Prefecture, Japan, operated by East Japan Railway Company (JR East).

== Lines ==
Hiratsuka Station is served by the Tokaido Main Line and also Shonan-Shinjuku Line through services. The station is 63.8 kilometers from the starting point of the Tokaido Main Line at Tokyo Station.

== Station layout ==
The station consists of two island platforms serving four tracks, connected to the station building by a footbridge. The station has a Midori no Madoguchi staffed ticket office. The station building has large shopping complexes to the north and south of the tracks.

== Platforms ==
1,2	Tokaido Line (Ueno-Tokyo Line)	for Yokohama, Tokyo, Ueno, Ōmiya; Utsunomiya Line for Utsunomiya and Kuroiso; Takasaki Line for Takasaki and Maebashi
1,2	Shōnan-Shinjuku Line	for Yokohama, Shibuya, Shinjuku, Ikebukuro, Ōmiya, Takasaki and Maebashi (via Takasaki Line)
3	Tōkaidō Line	for Kōzu, Odawara, Atami, Numazu; Itō Line for Itō
3	Shōnan-Shinjuku Line	for Yokohama, Shibuya, Shinjuku, Ikebukuro, Ōmiya, Takasaki and Maebashi (via Takasaki Line)
4	Tōkaidō Line	for Kōzu, Odawara, Atami, Numazu; Itō Line for Itō

== History ==
Hiratsuka Station was opened on July 11, 1887, for both freight and passenger service on what was later designated the Tokaido Main Line of Japanese National Railways (JNR). A number of short freight spur lines radiated out from Hiratsuka Station to serve the various industries which were developed in the vicinity of the station. Most of these spur lines were no longer in operation by 1924. The original station building was destroyed by soil liquefaction during the 1923 Great Kantō earthquake, which also brought down the bridge over the nearby Sagami River. The station building was completely rebuilt in June 1973. With the dissolution and privatization of JNR on April 1, 1987, the station came under the control of the East Japan Railway Company.

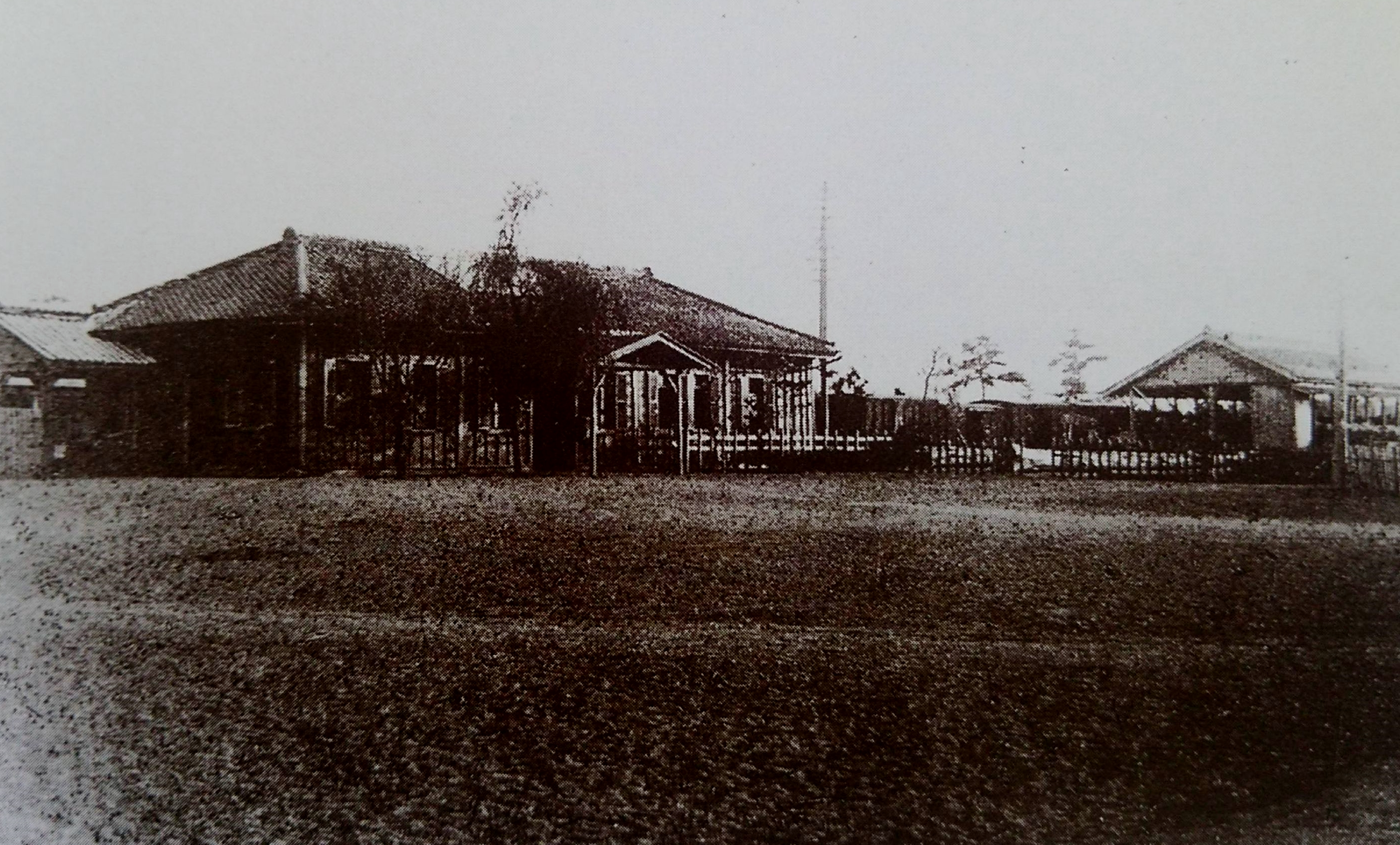
Hiratsuka Station in the early 20th century

== Passenger statistics ==
In fiscal 2019, the station was used by an average of 60,941 passengers daily.

The passenger figures for previous years are as shown below.

Fiscal year	daily average
2005	58,241
2010	59,955
2015	60,622

== Surrounding area ==
- Hiratsuka City Hall
- Hiratsuka Citizen Center
- Hiratsuka City Central Public Hall
- Hiratsuka City Museum

== See also ==
- List of railway stations in Japan
