= Shōnan (train) =

Japanese weekday limited express train service

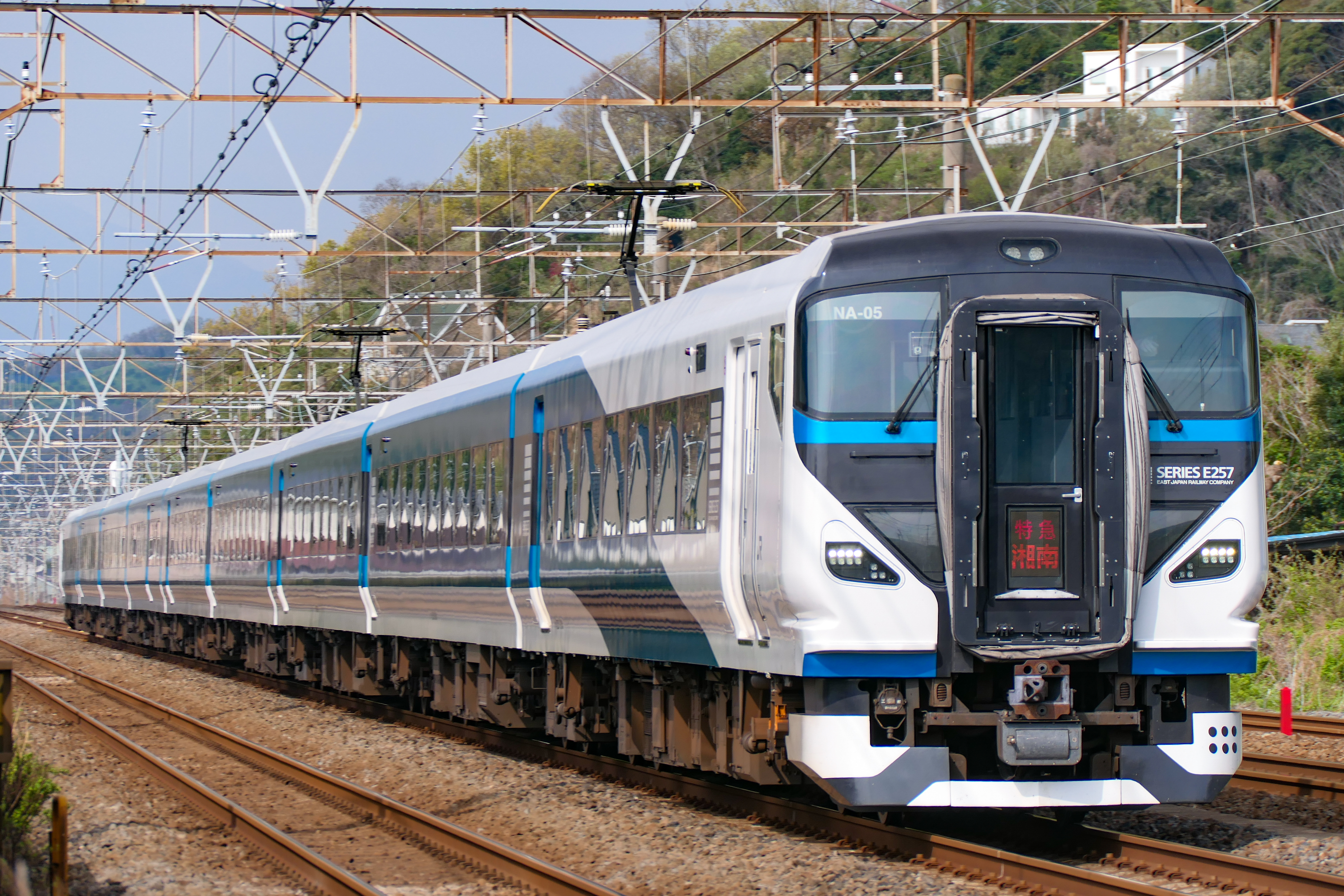
- E257-2000 series Shōnan in April 2022

Overview
- Service type: Limited Express (since 15 March 2021); Liner (until 12 March 2021)
- First service: 15 March 2021 (Limited Express); 1992 (Liner)
- Last service: 12 March 2021 (Liner)
- Current operator(s): JR East

Route
- Termini: Tokyo, Shinjuku; Hiratsuka, Odawara
- Line(s) used: Tokaido Main Line

Technical
- Rolling stock: E257 series EMUs

The Shōnan (湘南) is a weekday limited express train service for commuters on the Tōkaidō Main Line operated by East Japan Railway Company (JR East).

Before 15 March 2021, this was a "Home Liner" weekday commuter service, consisting of Shōnan Liner (湘南ライナー, Shōnan Rainā) (all day), Ohayō Liner Shinjuku (おはようライナー新宿, Ohayō-rainā Shinjuku) (morning), and Home Liner Odawara (ホームライナー小田原, Hōmurainā Odawara) (evening) services.

== Service pattern ==
The trains connect the Shōnan region of Kanagawa Prefecture with central Tokyo.

=== Shōnan Limited Express ===
There are ten inbound (morning) and eleven outbound (evening) Shōnan services each weekday, taking 69 to 86 minutes between Tokyo/Shinjuku and Odawara.

==== Route ====
The Shōnan operates between Tokyo or Shinjuku and Odawara, mainly on the Tōkaidō Line. Some trains run also on the Tōkaidō Freight Line and the Yokosuka Line, including Shōnan No. 1 (outbound) and Shōnan No. 6, 8, 10 (inbound), and among them, Shōnan No.6 terminates at Shinagawa, and Shōnan No. 8, 10 terminate at the Sōbu Line underground platforms at Tokyo. Shōnan No. 22, 24, 26 terminate at Shinjuku, while Shōnan No. 21, 13 begin at Shinjuku.

==== Stations served ====
Legends:

△ = Stops, boarding only
▽ = Stops, alighting only
● = Stops, boarding and alighting
↑ / ↓ = Passage
| = Doesn't operate in this section
■ = via Tōkaidō Main Line
■ = via Tōkaidō Freight Line
■ = via Yokosuka Line
■ = via Shōnan-Shinjuku Line (Yamanote Freight Line)

| Station | Train number | | | | | | | | | | |
| Station | Inbound | | | | | | | | Outbound | | |
| Station | 2 | 4 | 6 | 8 | 10 | 12, 14 | 22, 26 | 24 | 1, 3, 5, 7, 11, 13, 15, 17 | 9 | 21, 23 |
|---|---|---|---|---|---|---|---|---|---|---|---|
| Shinjuku | | | | | | | ▽ | ▽ | | | △ |
| Shibuya | | | | | | | ▽ | ▽ | | | △ |
| Osaki | | | | | | | ▽ | ▽ | | | △ |
| Tokyo | ▽ | ▽ | | ▽ | ▽ | ▽ | | | | | △ | △ | | |
| Shimbashi | ↑ | ↑ | | ▽ | ▽ | ↑ | | | | | ↓ | ↓ | | |
| Shinagawa | ▽ | ▽ | ▽ | ▽ | ▽ | ▽ | | | | | △ | △ | | |
| Ōfuna | △ | △ | ↑ | ↑ | ↑ | △ | ↑ | ↑ | ● | ● | ↓ |
| Fujisawa | △ | △ | △ | △ | △ | △ | △ | △ | ● | ● | ● |
| Tsujidō | △ | △ | ↑ | ↑ | ↑ | △ | ↑ | ↑ | ● | ● | ↓ |
| Chigasaki | △ | △ | △ | △ | △ | △ | △ | △ | ● | ● | ● |
| Hiratsuka | △ | △ | ↑ | ↑ | △ | △ | ↑ | △ | ● | ● | ● |
| Ninomiya | | ↑ | ↑ | ↑ | △ | ↑ | ↑ | △ | ↓ | ● | ● |
| Kōzu | | ↑ | ↑ | ↑ | △ | ↑ | ↑ | △ | ● | ● | ● |
| Odawara | | △ | △ | △ | △ | △ | △ | △ | ▽ | ▽ | ▽ |

=== Previous service patterns ===
==== Shōnan Liner ====
There were seven inbound (morning) and nine outbound (evening) Shōnan Liner services each weekday, taking 71 to 91 minutes between Tokyo and Odawara.

===== Route =====
The Shōnan Liner operated between Tokyo and Odawara, mainly on the Tōkaidō Line. Some trains ran also on the Tōkaidō Freight Line and the Yokosuka Line, including Shōnan Liner No. 1 (outbound) and Shōnan Liner No. 4, 6, 8, 10, 12 (inbound), and among them, Shōnan Liner No. 4, 10 terminated at Shinagawa, and Shōnan Liner No. 6, 8 terminated at the Sōbu Line underground platforms at Tokyo.

===== Stations served =====
Legends:

△ = Stops, boarding only
▽ = Stops, alighting only
● = Stops, boarding and alighting
↑ / ↓ = Passage
■ = via Tōkaidō Main Line
■ = via Tōkaidō Freight Line
■ = via Yokosuka Line

| Station | Train number | | | | | | | | |
| Station | Outbound | | | Inbound | | | | | |
| Station | 1 | 3, 5, 9, 11, 13, 15, 17 | 7 | 2, 14 | 4 | 6 | 8 | 10 | 12 |
|---|---|---|---|---|---|---|---|---|---|
| Tokyo | △ | △ | △ | ▽ | | ▽ | ▽ | | ▽ |
| Shimbashi | ↓ | ↓ | ↓ | ↑ | | ▽ | ▽ | | ↑ |
| Shinagawa | △ | △ | △ | ▽ | ▽ | ▽ | ▽ | ▽ | ▽ |
| Ōfuna | ↓ | ● | ● | △ | ↑ | ↑ | ↑ | ↑ | ↑ |
| Fujisawa | ● | ● | ● | △ | △ | △ | △ | △ | △ |
| Tsujidō | ↓ | ● | ● | △ | ↑ | ↑ | ↑ | ↑ | ↑ |
| Chigasaki | ● | ● | ● | △ | △ | △ | △ | △ | △ |
| Hiratsuka | ↓ | ● | ● | △ | ↑ | ↑ | △ | △ | ↑ |
| Ninomiya | ↓ | ↓ | ● | ↑ | ↑ | ↑ | △ | △ | ↑ |
| Kōzu | ↓ | ● | ● | ↑ | ↑ | ↑ | △ | △ | ↑ |
| Odawara | ▽ | ▽ | ▽ | △ | △ | △ | △ | △ | △ |

Generally, the stations served for different services all follow the same rules:

1. They all stop at Tokyo, Shinagawa, Fujisawa, Chigasaki and Odawara.
2. Only inbound services via the Yokosuka Line stop at Shimbashi.
3. Only services running solely on the Tōkaidō Main Line stop at Ōfuna and Tsujidō.
4. Only services running on the Tōkaidō Main Line (not Freight Line) west of Chigasaki stop at Hiratsuka, Ninomiya and Kōzu.

==== Ohayō Liner Shinjuku and Home Liner Odawara ====
The Ohayō Liner Shinjuku operated from Odawara Station to Shinjuku Station in the morning, and the Home Liner Odawara operated in the opposite direction in the evening. There were three inbound and two outbound services each weekday, taking 80 to 88 minutes between Shinjuku and Odawara. The Shinjuku-Odawara service competes with the Romancecar limited express services on the Odakyū Odawara Line, which take a similar amount of travel time. These services were once referred to collectively as the Shōnan-Shinjuku Liner, until late 2002.

===== Route =====
The Ohayō Liner Shinjuku and Home Liner Odawara operated between Shinjuku and Odawara, on the Shōnan–Shinjuku Line, the Tōkaidō Freight Line and the Tōkaidō Main Line.

===== Stations served =====
Legends:

△ = Stops, boarding only
▽ = Stops, alighting only
● = Stops, boarding and alighting
↑ / ↓ = Passage
■ = via Tōkaidō Main Line
■ = via Tōkaidō Freight Line
■ = via Shōnan-Shinjuku Line

| Station | Train number | | |
| Station | Ohayō Liner Shinjuku | | Home Liner Odawara |
| Station | 22, 26 | 24 | 21, 23 |
|---|---|---|---|
| Shinjuku | ▽ | ▽ | △ |
| Shibuya | ▽ | ▽ | △ |
| Fujisawa | △ | △ | ● |
| Chigasaki | △ | △ | ● |
| Hiratsuka | ↑ | △ | ● |
| Ninomiya | ↑ | △ | ● |
| Kōzu | ↑ | △ | ● |
| Odawara | △ | △ | ▽ |

Generally, the stations served for different services all follow the same rules:

1. They all stop at Shinjuku, Shibuya, Fujisawa, Chigasaki and Odawara.
2. Only services running on the Tōkaidō Main Line (not Freight Line) west of Chigasaki stop at Hiratsuka, Ninomiya and Kōzu.

== Ticketing ==
To board a Shōnan Liner, Ohayō Liner Shinjuku and Home Liner Odawara train, a Liner Ticket (ライナー券) is required, which costs 510 yen. Liner Tickets can be bought at ticket machines in stations or on platforms, by using cash or IC Cards such as Suica.

To board the Green Cars (グリーン車) on these trains, an additional Green Car Ticket (グリーン券) is required.

== Rolling stock ==
=== Current ===
- E257-2000/2500 series 5-, 9-, or 14-car EMUs (since 15 March 2021)
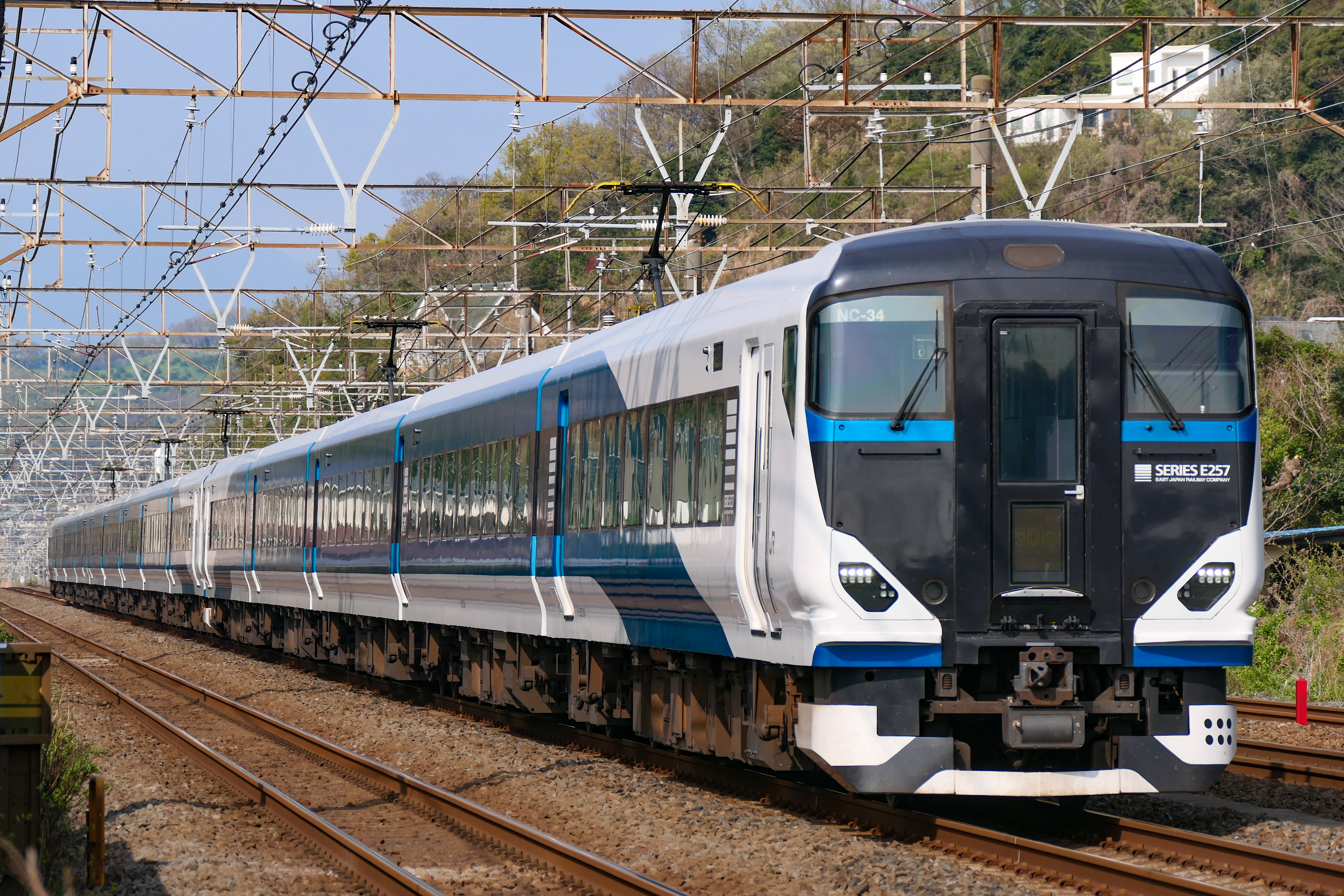
E257-2500 series Shōnan

=== Past ===
- 183 series 9-car EMUs (until June 2002)
- 185 series 7-, 10-, 12-, or 15-car EMUs (until 12 March 2021)
- 189 series 9-car EMUs (until June 2002)
- E351 series 12-car EMUs (from March 18, 1996 until March 14, 2008)
- E257 series 11-car EMUs (from July 1, 2002 until March 14, 2008)
- 215 series 10-car EMUs (until 12 March 2021)
- 251 series 10-car EMUs (Shinjuku services only, until March 2020)
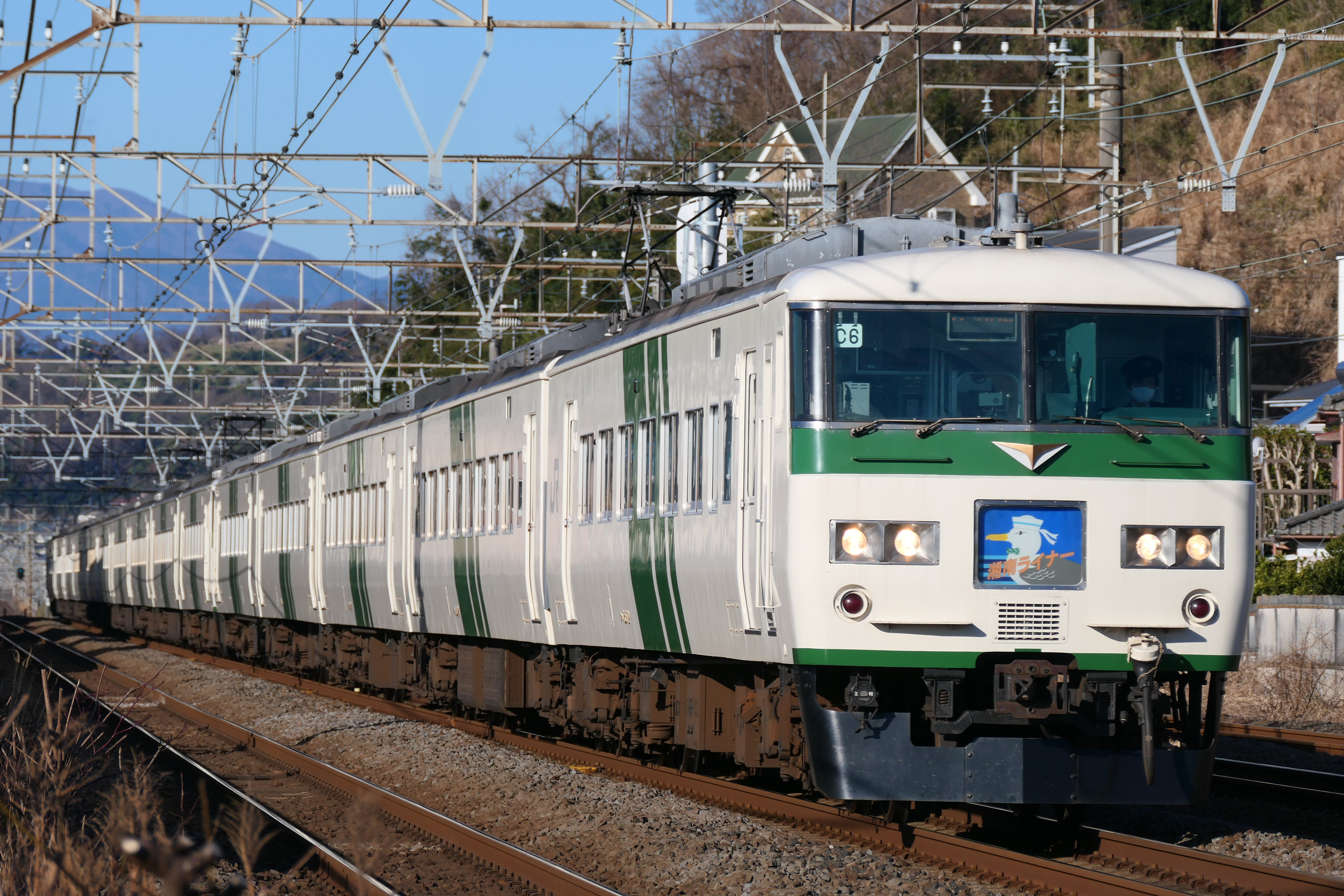
185 series Shōnan Liner

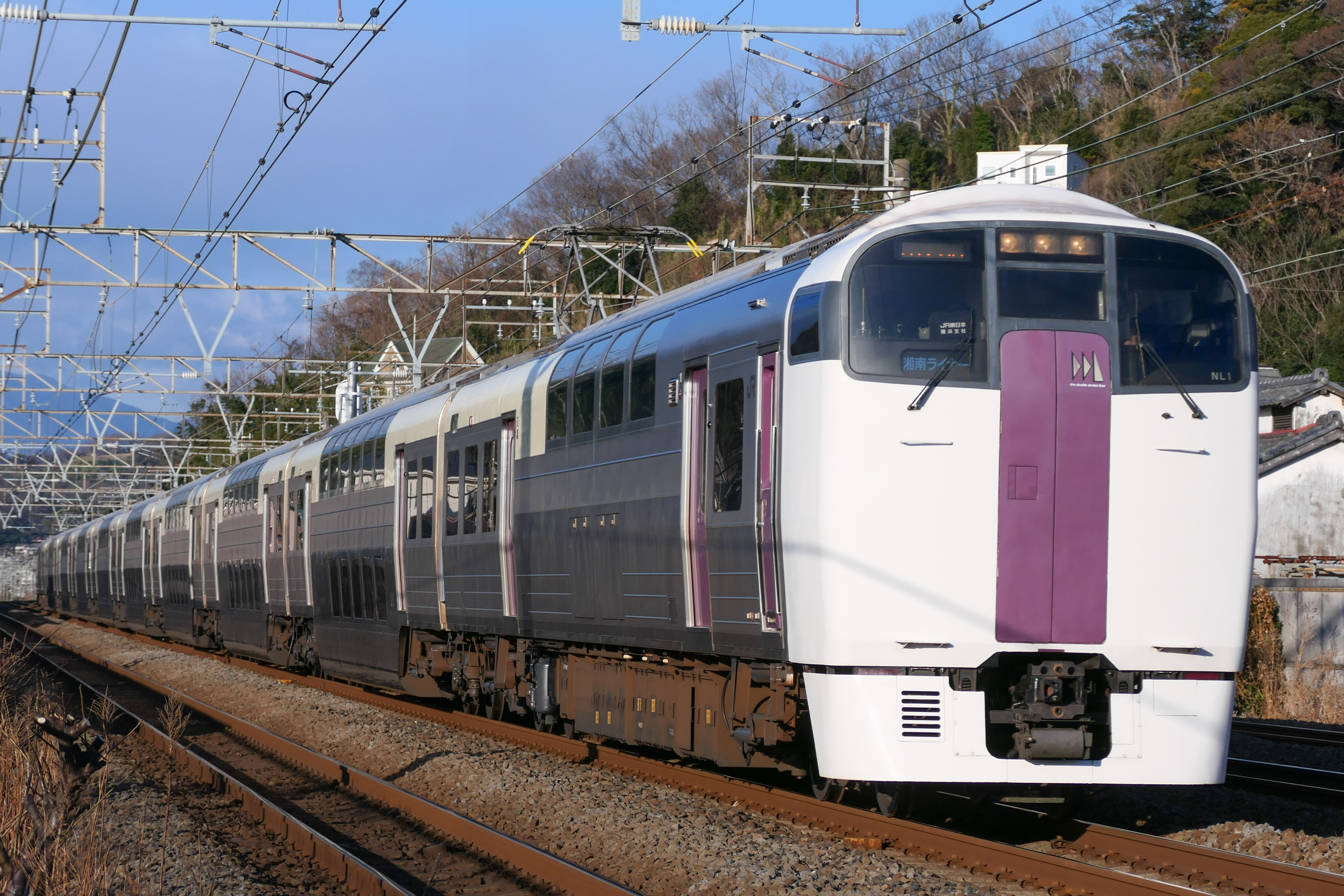
215 series Shōnan Liner

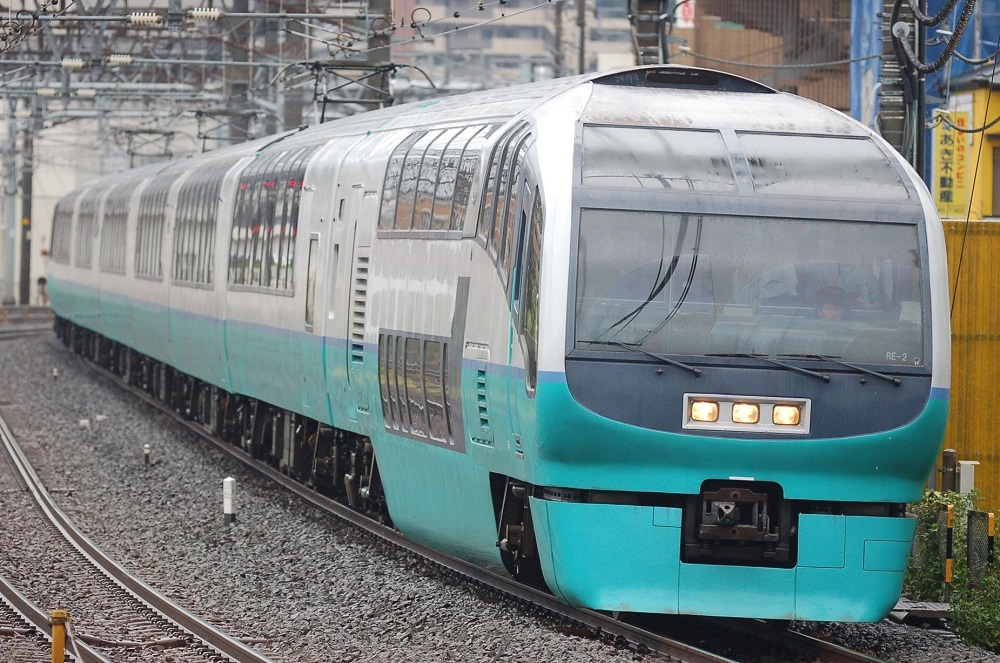
251 series
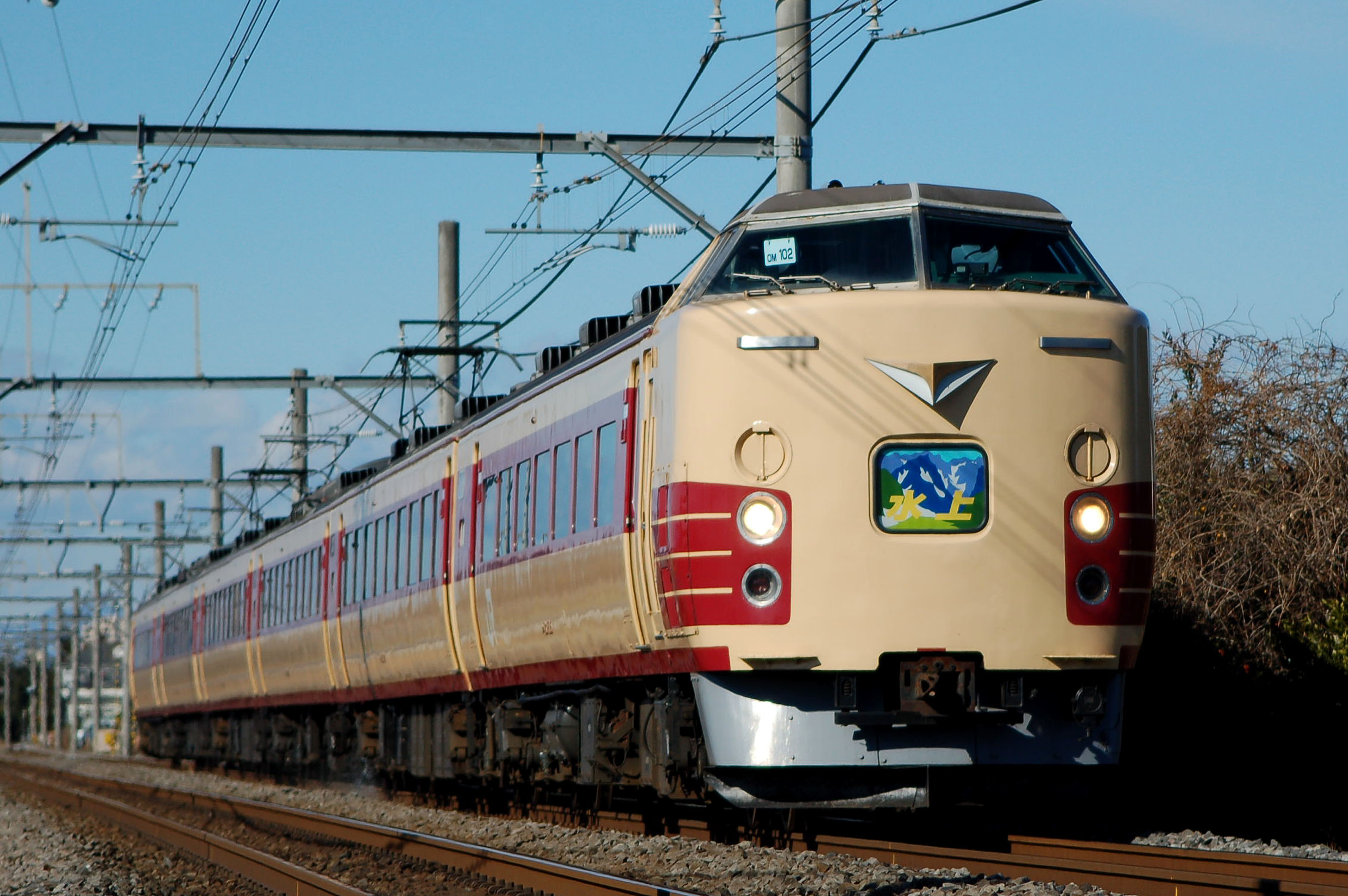
183 series

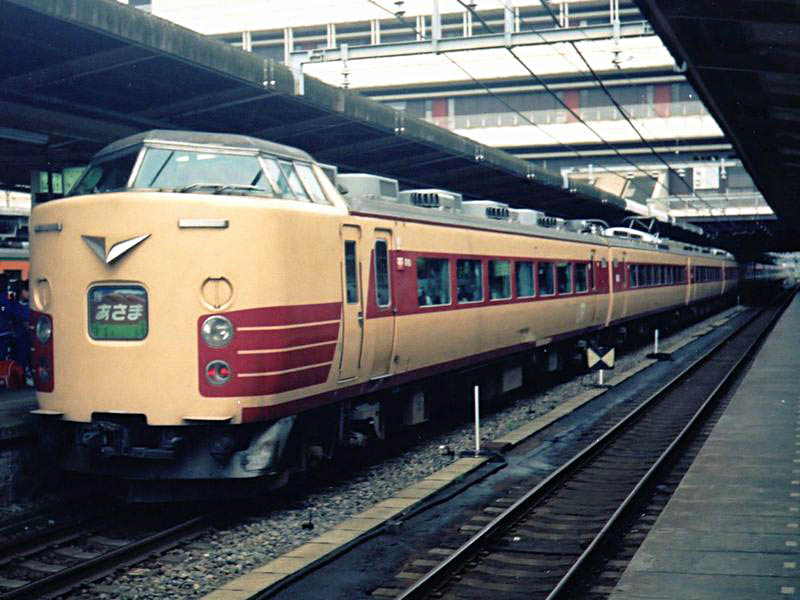
189 series

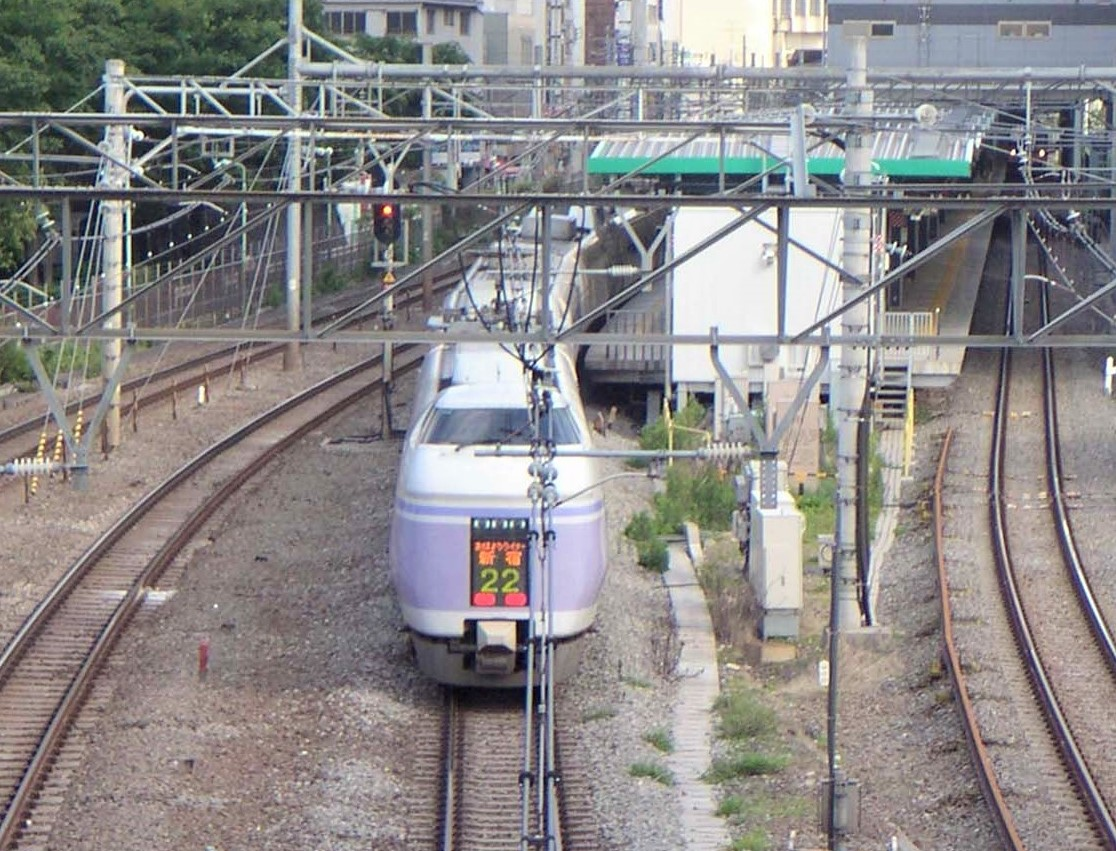
E351 series Ohayō Liner Shinjuku

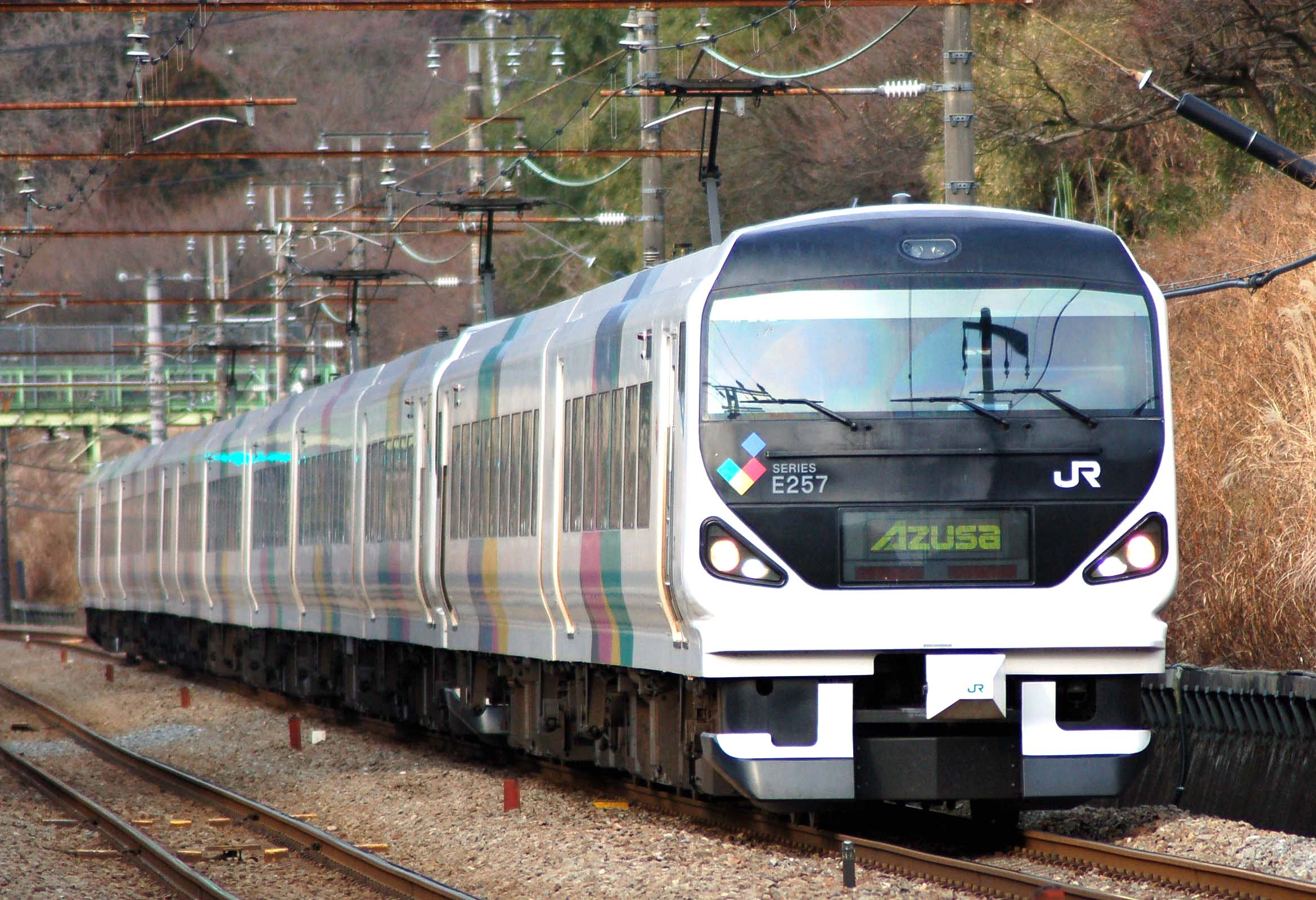
E257 series

== See also ==
- List of named passenger trains of Japan
