= Kōzu Station (Kanagawa) =

Railway station in Odawara, Kanagawa Prefecture, Japan

JT14 CB00 Kōzu 国府津駅
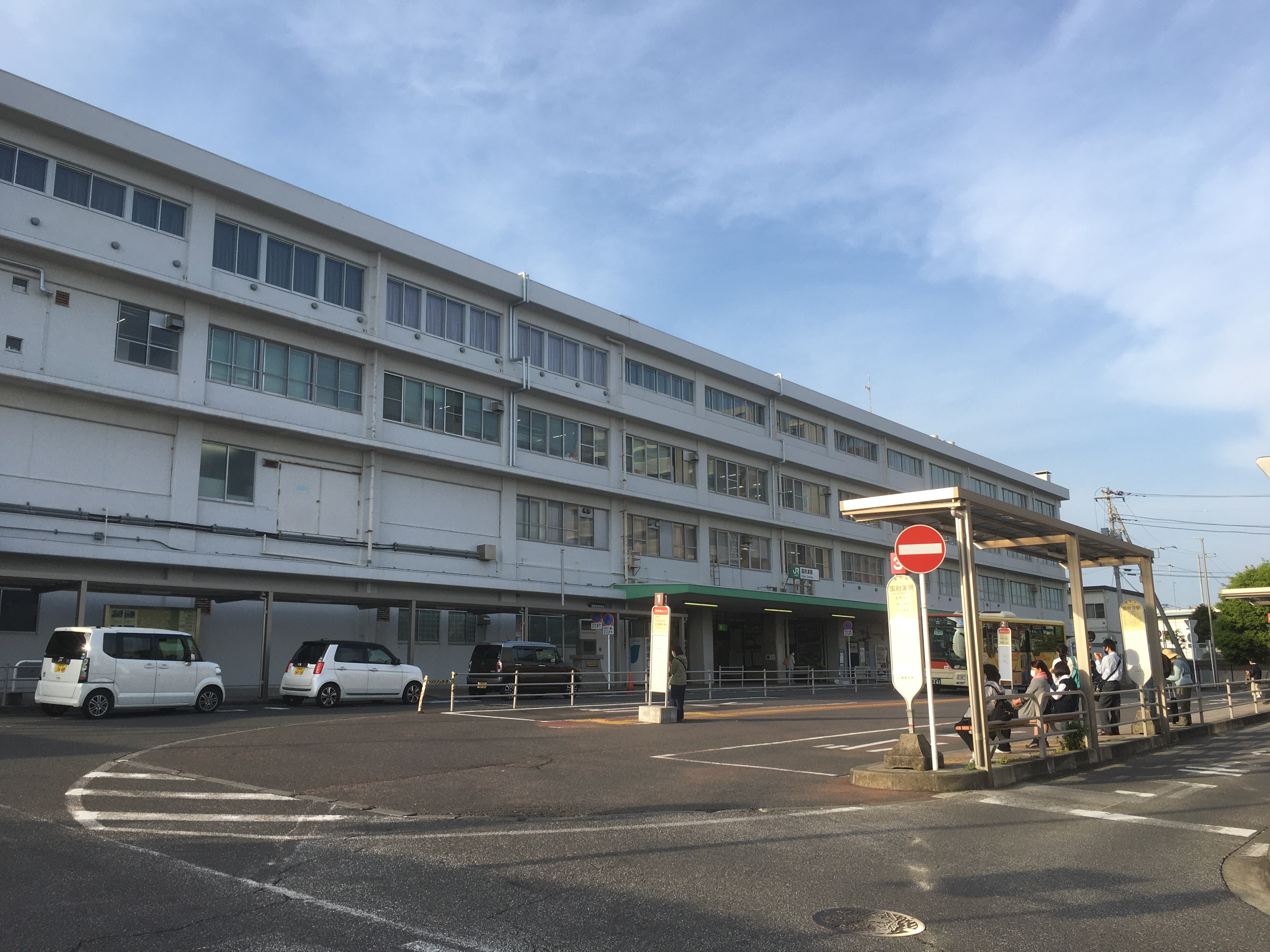
- The station building in May 2021

General information
- Location: 4-1 Kōzu, Odawara City, Kanagawa Prefecture 256-0812; Japan
- Coordinates: 35°16′51″N 139°12′46.6″E
- System
- Operator: JR East
- Lines: Tōkaidō Line; Shōnan–Shinjuku Line; Gotemba Line
- Distance: 77.7 km (48.3 mi) from Tokyo
- Platforms: 2 island + 1 side platform
- Train operators: JR East; JR Central
- Connections: Bus terminal

Other information
- Status: Staffed (Midori no Madoguchi)
- Station code: JT14, CB00
- Website: Official website

History
- Opened: 11 July 1887; 139 years ago

Passengers
- FY2019: 5,845 daily

Services
Preceding station	JR East	Following station
Odawara JT16 Terminus	Shōnan	Ninomiya JT13 towards Tokyo or Shinjuku
Kamonomiya JT15 towards Atami	Tōkaidō Line	Ninomiya JT13 towards Tokyo
Odawara JT16 Terminus	Shōnan–Shinjuku Line Special Rapid	Hiratsuka JT11 towards Maebashi
Kamonomiya JT15 towards Odawara	Shōnan–Shinjuku Line Rapid	Ninomiya JT13 towards Maebashi
Preceding station	JR Central	Following station
Shimo-Soga CB01 towards Numazu	Gotemba Line	Terminus
Location
- Location within Kanagawa Prefecture Location within Kanto Area Location within Japan

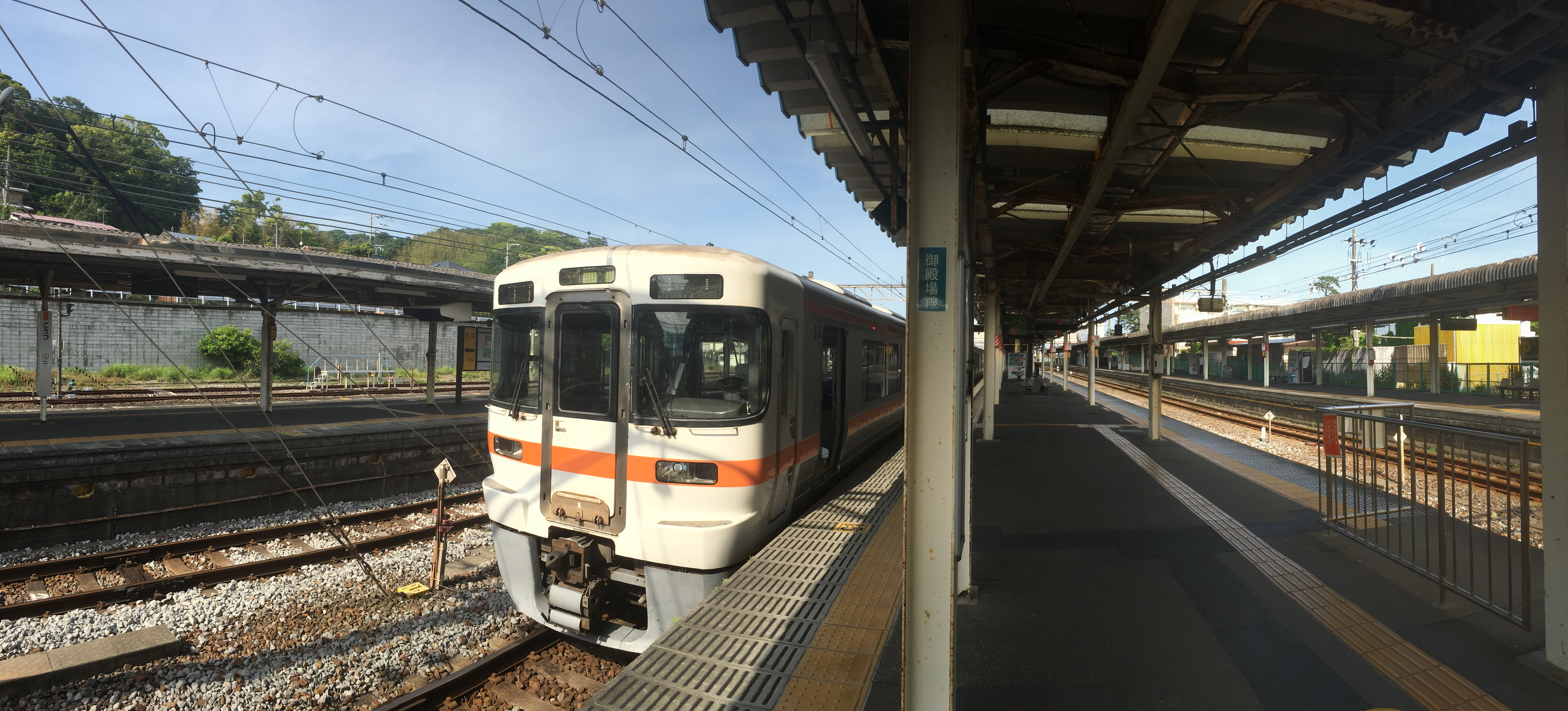
Platforms, 2021

Kōzu Station (国府津駅, Kōzu-eki) is a passenger railway station located in the city of Odawara, Kanagawa Prefecture, Japan, operated by both the East Japan Railway Company (JR East) and the Central Japan Railway Company (JR Tōkai).

== Lines ==
Kōzu Station is served by both the Tōkaidō Main Line and Gotemba Line, and is located 77.7 kilometers from Tokyo Station. Some trains of the Shōnan-Shinjuku Line also stop at this station.

=== Station layout ===
The station has one side platform and two island platforms serving five tracks, connected to the station building by a footbridge. The station has a Midori no Madoguchi staffed ticket office.

== Platforms ==
1,2	Tōkaidō Line	for Odawara, Atami, Numazu; Itō Line for Itō
3	Gotemba Line	for Matsuda, Yamakita, Gotemba, and Numazu
4,5	Tokaido Line (Ueno-Tokyo Line)	for Hiratsuka, Yokohama, Tokyo, Ueno, Ōmiya; Utsunomiya Line for Utsunomiya and Kuroiso; Takasaki Line for Takasaki and Maebashi
4,5	Shōnan-Shinjuku Line	for Yokohama, Shibuya, Shinjuku, Ikebukuro, Ōmiya, Takasaki and Maebashi (via Takasaki Line)

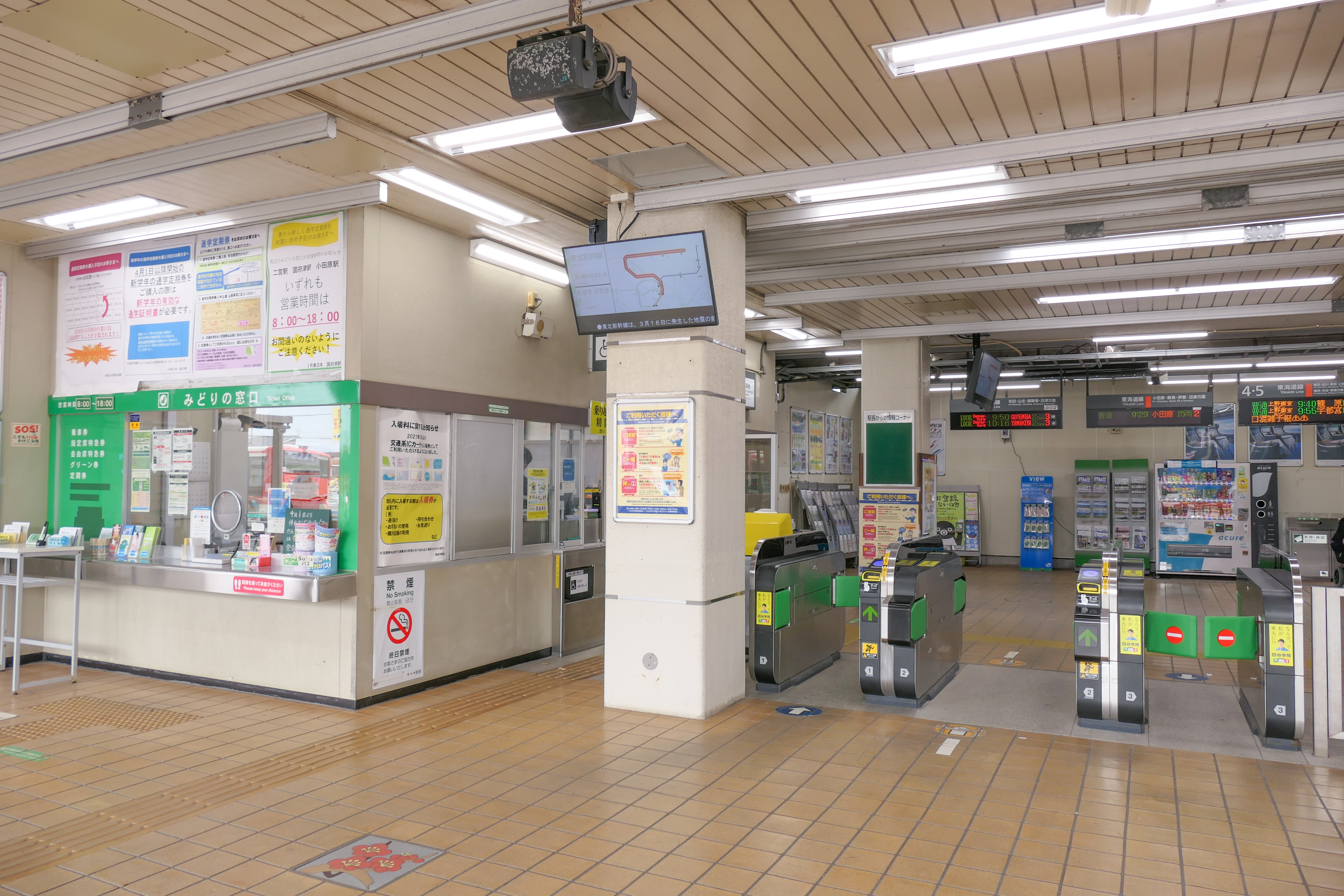
Ticket Gate (March 2022)

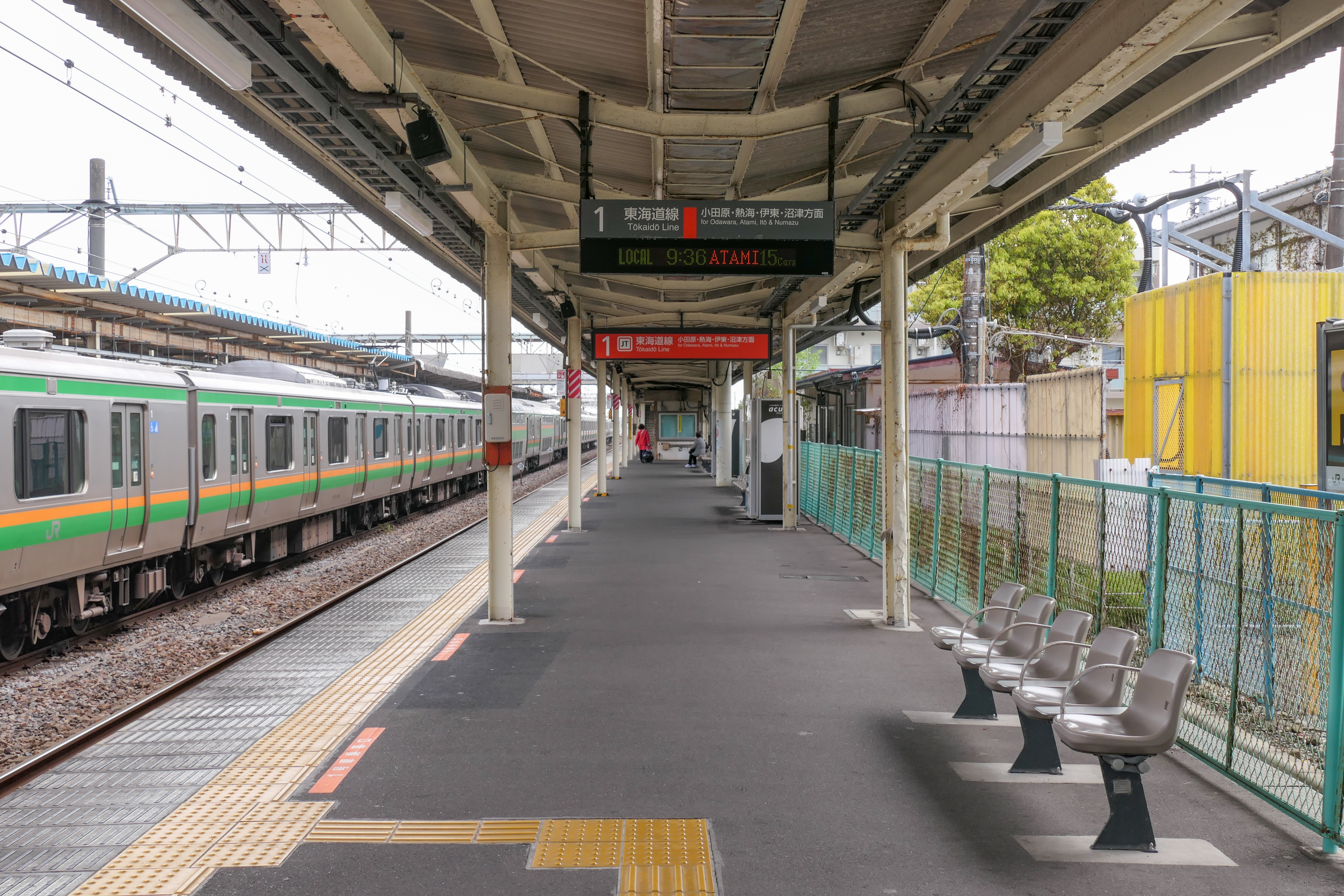
Platform 1 (March 2022)

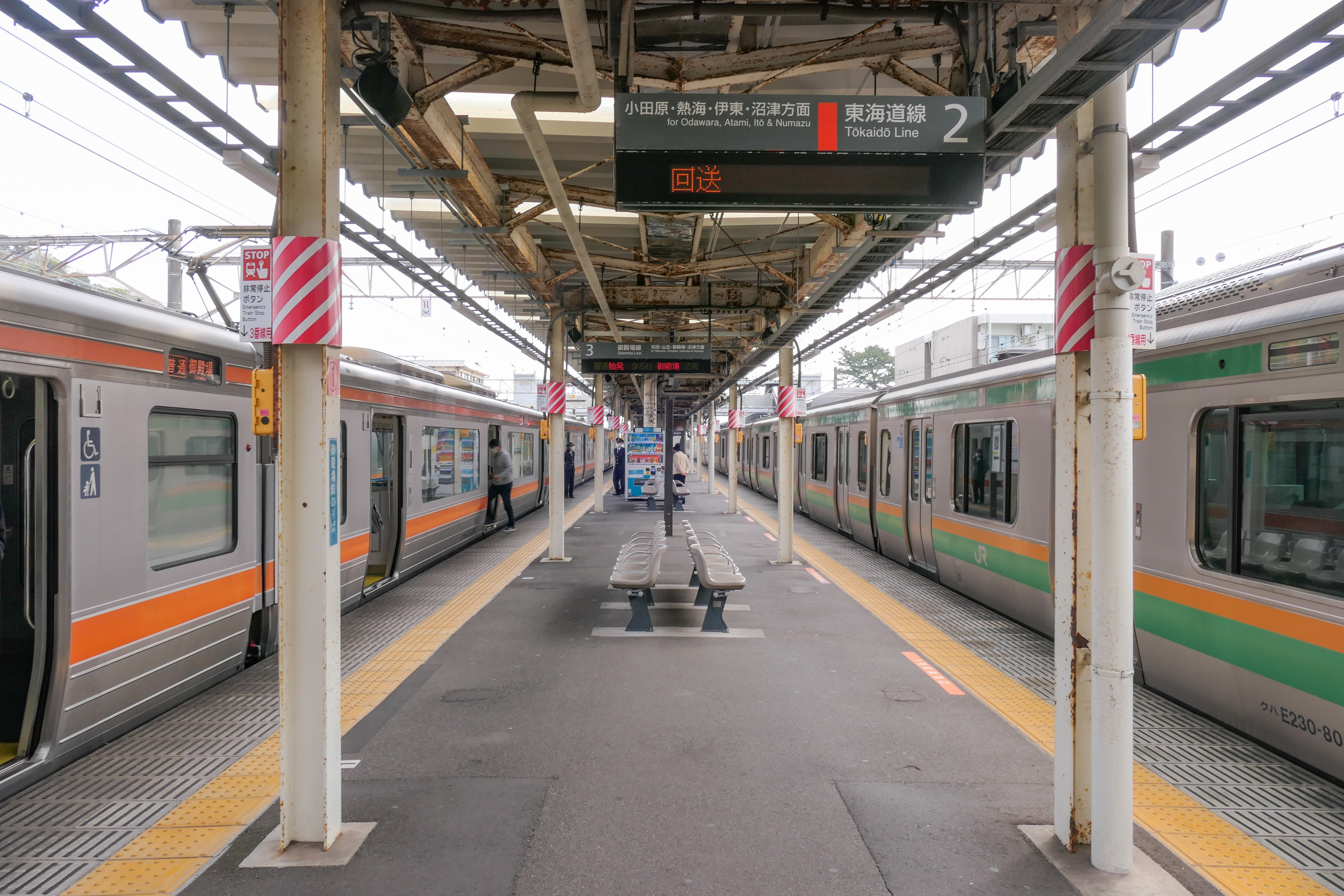
Platform 2 and 3 (March 2022)

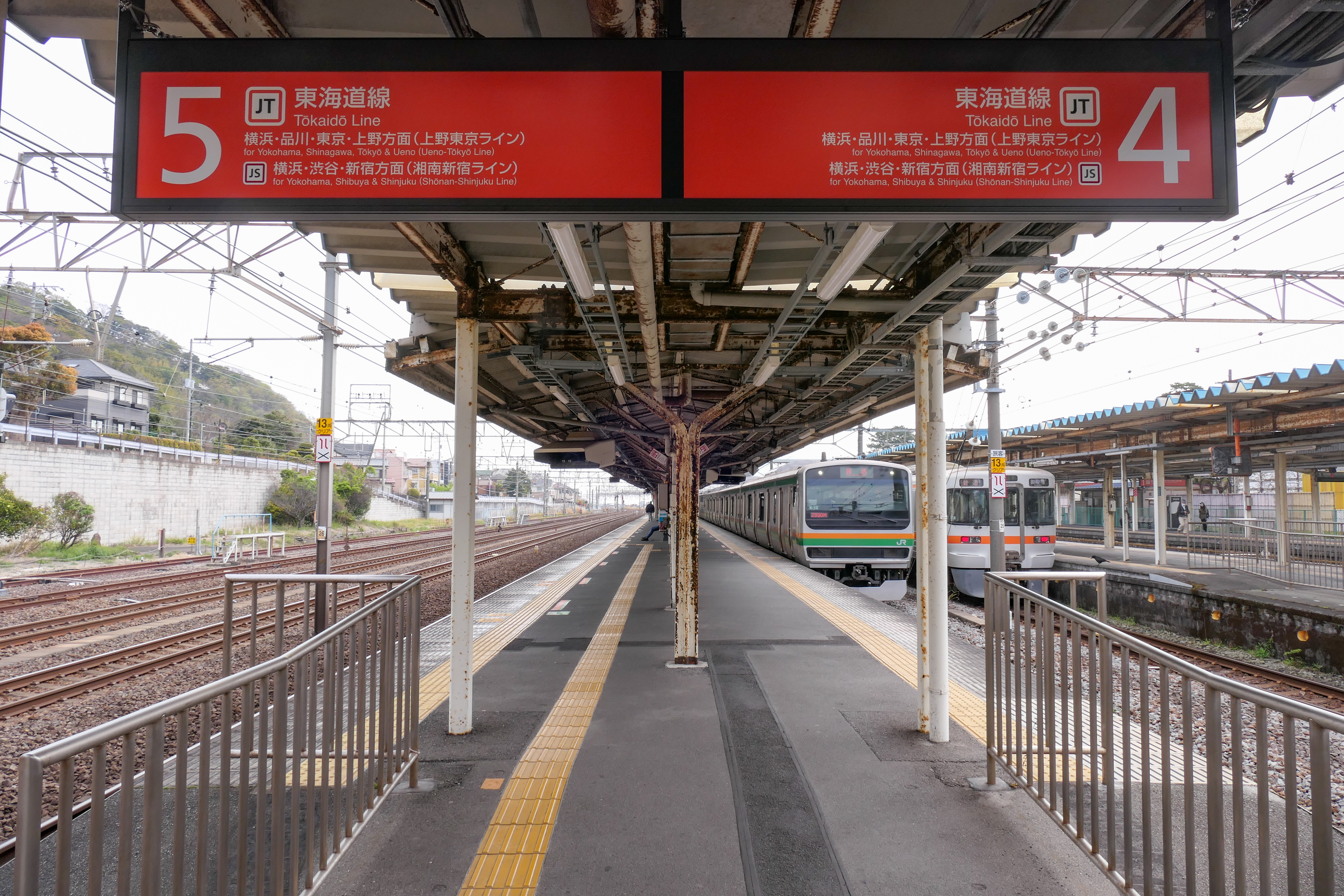
Platform 4 and 5 (March 2022)

== History ==
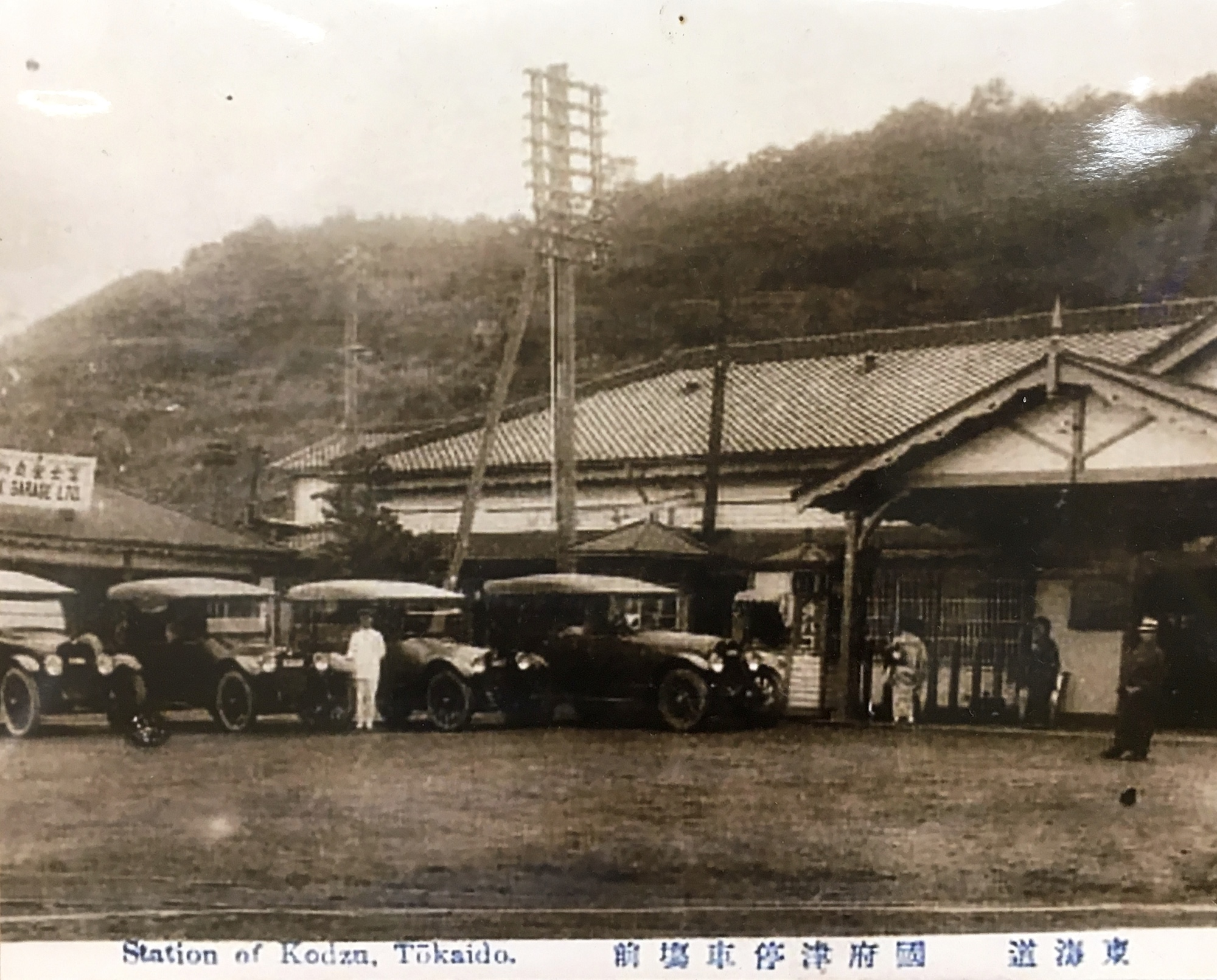
The original station building

Kōzu Station opened on July 11, 1887. With the dissolution and privatization of Japanese National Railways (JNR) on April 1, 1987, the station became a border station under the control of both JR East and JR Central.

== Passenger statistics ==
In fiscal 2019, the station was used by an average of 5,845 passengers daily.

The passenger figures (boarding passengers only) for previous years are as shown below.

Fiscal year	daily average
2005	12,122
2010	6,441
2015	6,322

== Surrounding area ==
- Kōzu Post Office
- Kōzu Elementary School
- Kōzu Junior High School
- Yamachika Memorial Hospital

== See also ==
- List of railway stations in Japan
