= Shōnan–Shinjuku Line =

Passenger railway service in Japan

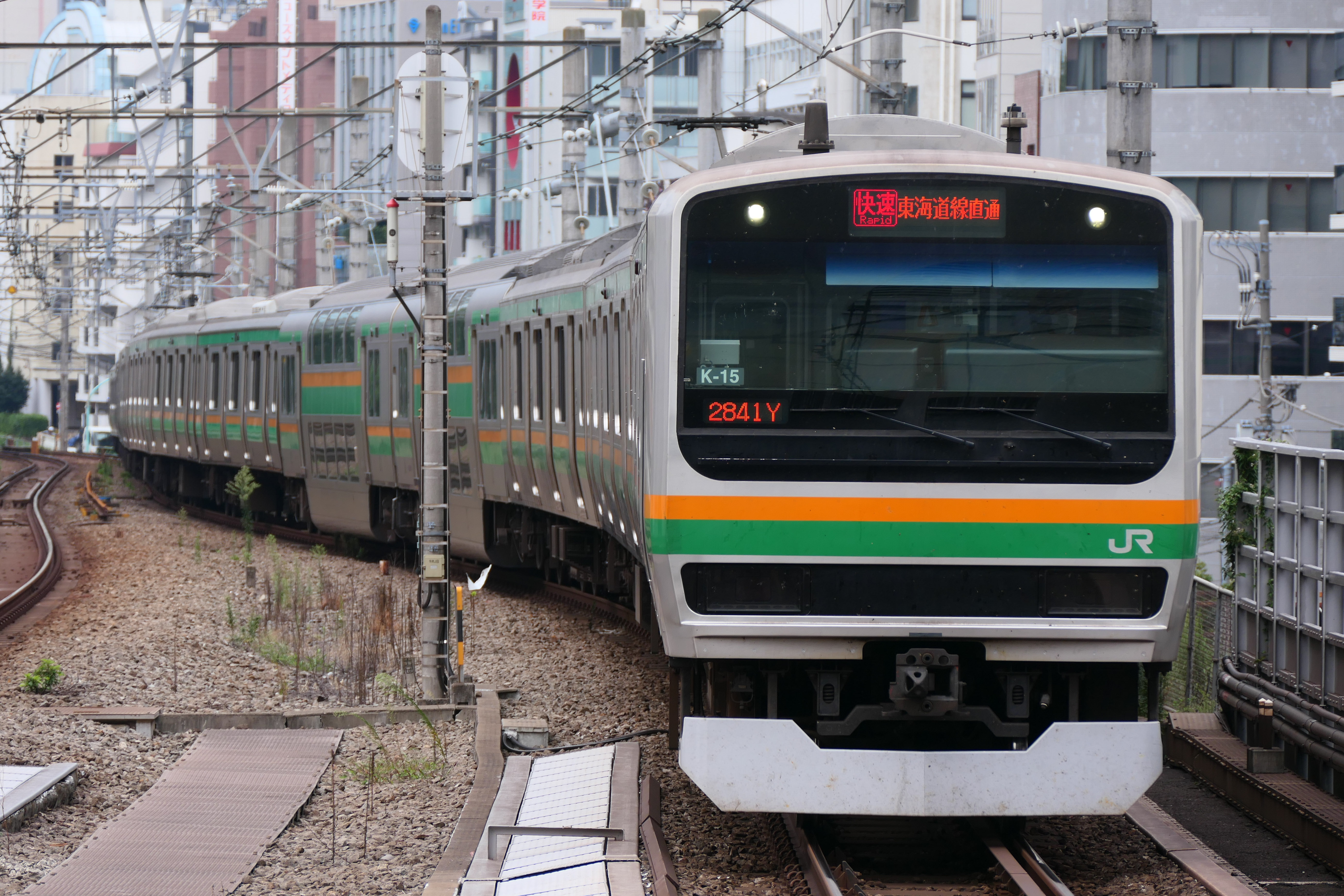
- An E231 series Shōnan Shinjuku Line train at Ebisu

Overview
- Locale: Kantō region

Service
- Type: Commuter rail
- Operator: JR East
- Daily ridership: 478,836 daily (2015)

History
- Opened: December 1, 2001; 24 years ago

Technical
- Track gauge: 1,067 mm (3 ft 6 in)
- Electrification: Overhead line, 1,500 V DC
- Operating speed: 120 km/h (75 mph)
Route map

The Shōnan–Shinjuku Line (Japanese: 湘南新宿ライン, Hepburn: Shōnan-Shinjuku Rain) is a passenger railway service in Japan which commenced in December 2001. The line has no dedicated track as services run through shared sections along the Ryōmō Line, Takasaki Line, Utsunomiya Line, Yamanote freight line, Yokosuka Line, and Tōkaidō Main Line. It is treated as a distinct service at stations and on railway maps.

== Services ==
Service patterns on the Shōnan–Shinjuku Line are as follows:

=== Utsunomiya Line–Yokosuka Line route ===
- Shōnan–Shinjuku Line local (Utsunomiya Line: local; Ōmiya–Ōfuna: local; Yokosuka Line: local)
  - Services commenced on December 1, 2001.
  - One train per hour is operated between Koganei (some to/from Utsunomiya) and Zushi; this increases to 2–3 trains per hour during peak periods. Sometimes trains operate to/from Ōfuna as well as to/from Koga on weekday mornings.
  - Most trains are operated in 15-car sets. Some pause at Koganei to couple-up or divide, with the 10-car portion continues northward; others are operated in 10-car sets along the entire line.
  - E233 series LED Displays show a green colour ■ for this service.
- Shōnan–Shinjuku Line local / Shōnan–Shinjuku Line rapid (Utsunomiya Line: Rapid; Ōmiya–Ōfuna: Local; Yokosuka Line: Local)
  - Services commenced on October 16, 2004.
  - From morning to midday, trains are operated hourly between Utsunomiya and Zushi (some to/from Ōfuna). Trains operate as rapid services within the Utsunomiya Line and as local services within the Yokosuka Line. These services replace daytime Rabbit rapid trains within the Utsunomiya Line to/from Ueno.
  - Most trains are operated in 15-car sets. Some pause at Koganei to couple-up or divide, with the 10-car portion is operated north of Koganei; others are operated in 10-car sets along the entire line.
  - E233 series LED Displays show an orange colour ■ within the Utsunomiya Line, and a green colour ■ south of Ōmiya for this service.

=== Takasaki Line–Tōkaidō Line route ===
- Shōnan–Shinjuku Line local / Shōnan–Shinjuku Line rapid (Takasaki Line: Local; Ōmiya–Totsuka: Rapid; Totsuka–Tōkaidō Line: Local)
  - Services commenced on December 1, 2001.
  - One train per hour is operated between Kagohara and Hiratsuka (some to/from Kōzu). During peak periods when there are no special rapid services this increases to 2–3 trains per hour, with trains to/from Takasaki, Kōzu, and Odawara. Some morning southbound trains and weekday evening northbound trains operate to/from Maebashi via the Ryōmō Line; one weekday morning train is operated from Fukaya.
  - Except for a single northbound morning and southbound evening train, all trains are operated in 15-car sets south of Kagohara, where they are joined/separated; a 10-car train is operated north of Kagohara. The train from Fukaya is operated as a 15-car set.
  - E233 series LED Displays show an orange colour ■ between Ōmiya and Totsuka, and a green colour ■ within the Takasaki and Tōkaidō Lines for this service.
- Shōnan–Shinjuku Line special rapid (Takasaki Line–Ōmiya–Ōfuna–Tōkaidō Line: Special Rapid)
  - Services commenced on October 16, 2004.
  - One train per hour is operated throughout the day. This service replaces Urban rapid services to/from Ueno within the Takasaki Line. Except for the first northbound train, which starts from Hiratsuka, all trains are operated between Takasaki and Odawara.
  - Except for two round trips on weekdays, all trains are operated in 15-car sets (containing 1 10 car train and 1 5 car train) south of Kagohara, where they are joined/separated; a 10-car train is operated north of Kagohara.
  - On very rare occasions in the past, extra services would be operated on weekends and holidays, in which two services each way to/from Odawara are extended to/from Atami, stopping at Manazuru and Yugawara.
  - E233 series LED Displays show a blue colour ■ for this service.

== Station list ==
- Trains stop at stations marked "●" and pass those marked "｜".
- For information on Limited Express services, see the Shōnan article.

Line name		Station	Distance (km)		Services				Transfers	Location	
Official	Actual	Station	Between stations	From Shinjuku	Local	Rapid (Note: Southbound Rapid trains from the Utsunomiya Line are labeled "Rapid" between Utsunomiya and Ōmiya and "Local" between Ōmiya and Zushi. Northbound trains are labeled "Local" between Zushi and Ōsaki and "Rapid" between Ōsaki and Utsunomiya. In the timetable of stations on the JR East website, all stations are guided as rapid trains.)	Rapid (Note: Southbound Rapid trains from the Takasaki Line are labeled "Local" between Maebashi and Ōmiya, "Rapid" between Ōmiya and Totsuka, and "Local" between Totsuka and Odawara. Northbound trains are labeled "Rapid" between Odawara and Ōsaki and "Local" between Ōsaki and Maebashi. In the timetable of stations on the JR East website, all stations are guided as rapid trains.)	Special Rapid	Transfers	Location	
Through services:					Utsunomiya Line		Takasaki Line		Utsunomiya Line (Tohoku Main Line): for Koganei and Utsunomiya; Takasaki Line: for Kagohara, Takasaki, and Maebashi (via the Ryōmō Line)		
Tohoku Main Line	Tohoku Freight Line	Ōmiya	–	33.2 (27.4)	●	●	●	●	Tohoku Shinkansen; Yamagata Shinkansen; Akita Shinkansen; Hokkaido Shinkansen; Joetsu Shinkansen; Hokuriku Shinkansen; Keihin-Tōhoku Line; Utsunomiya Line; Takasaki Line; Saikyō Line; ■ Kawagoe Line; Tobu Urban Park Line; New Shuttle	Ōmiya-ku, Saitama	Saitama
Tohoku Main Line	Tohoku Freight Line	Urawa	–	27.1 (21.3)	●	●	●	●	Keihin-Tōhoku Line; Utsunomiya Line; Takasaki Line	Urawa-ku, Saitama	Saitama
Tohoku Main Line	Tohoku Freight Line	Akabane	17.1	16.1 (10.3 (Note: The Ikebukuro–Akabane section is treated as passing over the Akabane Line when calculating fares; therefore, actual distance is approximately 9.5 km.))	●	●	●	●	Utsunomiya Line (for Ueno); Takasaki Line (for Ueno); Keihin-Tōhoku Line; Saikyō Line	Kita	Tokyo
Yamanote Line	Yamanote Freight Line	Ikebukuro	5.5	4.8	●	●	●	●	Saikyō Line (Note: The Shōnan–Shinjuku Line shares tracks with the Saikyō Line between Ikebukuro and Ōsaki.); Yamanote Line; Seibu Ikebukuro Line; Tobu Tojo Line; Tokyo Metro Marunouchi Line (M-25); Tokyo Metro Yurakucho Line (Y-09); Tokyo Metro Fukutoshin Line (F-09)	Toshima	Tokyo
Yamanote Line	Yamanote Freight Line	Shinjuku	4.8	0.0	●	●	●	●	Chūō Line (Rapid); Chūō-Sōbu Line; Yamanote Line; Saikyō Line; Keio Line; Keio New Line; Odakyu Odawara Line; Tokyo Metro Marunouchi Line (M-08); Toei Shinjuku Line (S-01); Toei Oedo Line (E-27, Shinjuku-nishiguchi: E-01); Seibu Shinjuku Line (Seibu-Shinjuku)	Shinjuku	Tokyo
Yamanote Line	Yamanote Freight Line	Shinjuku	4.8	0.0	●	●	●	●	Chūō Line (Rapid); Chūō-Sōbu Line; Yamanote Line; Saikyō Line; Keio Line; Keio New Line; Odakyu Odawara Line; Tokyo Metro Marunouchi Line (M-08); Toei Shinjuku Line (S-01); Toei Oedo Line (E-27, Shinjuku-nishiguchi: E-01); Seibu Shinjuku Line (Seibu-Shinjuku)	Shibuya	Tokyo
Yamanote Line	Yamanote Freight Line	Shibuya	3.4	3.4	●	●	●	●	Saikyō Line; Yamanote Line; Keio Inokashira Line; Tokyu Den-en-toshi Line; Tokyu Toyoko Line; Tokyo Metro Ginza Line (G-01); Tokyo Metro Hanzōmon Line (Z-01); Tokyo Metro Fukutoshin Line (F-16)	Shibuya	Tokyo
Yamanote Line	Yamanote Freight Line	Ebisu	1.6	5.0	●	●	●	｜	Saikyō Line; Yamanote Line; Tokyo Metro Hibiya Line (H-02)	Shibuya	Tokyo
Yamanote Line	Yamanote Freight Line	Ōsaki	3.6	8.6	●	●	●	●	Yamanote Line; Rinkai Line; Saikyo Line	Shinagawa	Tokyo
Tōkaidō Main Line	Hinkaku Line	Nishi-Ōi; JS16	5.6 (Note: The Nishi-Ōi–Ōsaki section is treated as passing through Shinagawa when calculating fares.)	14.2}	●	●	｜	｜	Yokosuka Line (for Shinagawa)	Shinagawa	Tokyo
Tōkaidō Main Line	Hinkaku Line	Musashi-Kosugi	6.4	20.6	●	●	●	●	Yokosuka Line; Nambu Line; Tokyu Toyoko Line; Tokyu Meguro Line; Sōtetsu–JR Link Line (Through service)	Nakahara-ku, Kawasaki	Kanagawa
Tōkaidō Main Line	Hinkaku Line	Shin-Kawasaki; JS14	2.7	23.3	●	●	｜	｜	Nambu Line (Kashimada, unofficial); Yokosuka Line	Saiwai-ku, Kawasaki	Kanagawa
Tōkaidō Main Line	Yokosuka Line tracks	Yokohama	12.2	35.5	●	●	●	●	Keihin-Tōhoku Line; Negishi Line; Yokohama Line; Tōkaidō Line; Tokyu Toyoko Line; Keikyu Main Line; Sotetsu Main Line; Yokohama Municipal Subway Blue Line (B20); Minatomirai Line	Nishi-ku, Yokohama	Kanagawa
Tōkaidō Main Line	Yokosuka Line tracks	Hodogaya; JS12	3.0	38.5	●	●	｜	｜	Yokosuka Line	Hodogaya-ku, Yokohama	Kanagawa
Tōkaidō Main Line	Yokosuka Line tracks	Higashi-Totsuka; JS11	4.9	43.4	●	●	｜	｜	Yokosuka Line	Totsuka-ku, Yokohama	Kanagawa
Tōkaidō Main Line	Yokosuka Line tracks	Totsuka	4.2	47.6	●	●	●	●	Yokosuka Line; Tōkaidō Line; Yokohama Municipal Subway Blue Line (B06)	Totsuka-ku, Yokohama	Kanagawa
Tōkaidō Main Line	(Note: Between Totsuka and Ōfuna, through-service trains for the Tōkaidō Line travel over Tōkaidō Line tracks, while through service trains for the Yokosuka Line travel over Yokosuka Line tracks.)	Ōfuna	5.6	53.2	●	●	●	●	Tōkaidō Line (through service); Yokosuka Line; Negishi Line; Shōnan Monorail	Sakae-ku, Yokohama	Kanagawa
Tōkaidō Main Line	(Note: Between Totsuka and Ōfuna, through-service trains for the Tōkaidō Line travel over Tōkaidō Line tracks, while through service trains for the Yokosuka Line travel over Yokosuka Line tracks.)	Ōfuna	5.6	53.2	●	●	●	●	Tōkaidō Line (through service); Yokosuka Line; Negishi Line; Shōnan Monorail	Kamakura	Kanagawa
Yokosuka Line		Ōfuna	5.6	53.2	●	●	●	●	Tōkaidō Line (through service); Yokosuka Line; Negishi Line; Shōnan Monorail	Kamakura	Kanagawa
Yokosuka Line		Kita-Kamakura JS08	2.3	55.5	●	●	｜	｜	Yokosuka Line	Kamakura	Kanagawa
Yokosuka Line		Kamakura JS07	2.2	57.7	●	●	｜	｜	Yokosuka Line	Kamakura	Kanagawa
Yokosuka Line		Zushi JS06	3.9	61.8	●	●	｜	｜	Yokosuka Line	Zushi, Kanagawa	Kanagawa
Through services:							Tōkaidō Line		Tōkaidō Line: for Hiratsuka, Kōzu, and Odawara		

== Rolling stock ==
- E231-1000 series
- E233-3000 series (since March 2015)

Initially, services were operated using a mixture of rolling stock, including 115 series, 211 series, 215 series (double-deck), E217 series, and E231-1000 series EMUs, but rolling stock was standardized on the E231-1000 series EMUs in 2004, from which date these trains also included two bilevel Green cars. From the start of the new timetable on 14 March 2015, E233-3000 series trainsets were also introduced on Shonan–Shinjuku Line services.

== History ==
On 20 August 2016, station numbering was introduced with stations being assigned station numbers between JS06 and JS24. Numbers increase towards in the northbound direction towards Omiya.

== See also ==
- Ueno-Tokyo Line, a similar north-south line running through the east side of central Tokyo
- F Liner, a competitor to the Shonan-Shinjuku Line between Ikebukuro / Shinjuku / Shibuya to Yokohama.
- Utsunomiya Line
- Tohoku Main Line
- Takasaki Line
