= Ashigara =

Ashigara may refer to:

- Ashigara Pass in Kanagawa Prefecture, Japan
- Mount Ashigara in Kanagawa Prefecture, Japan
- Ashigara Station (Kanagawa), a railway station in Odawara, Kanagawa, Japan
- Ashigara Station (Shizuoka), a railway station in Oyama, Shizuoka, Japan
- Japanese cruiser Ashigara, a cruiser of the Imperial Japanese Navy, named after the mountain
- JS Ashigara (DDG-178), an Atago class destroyer of the Japan Maritime Self-Defense Force
