= Kawamura Castle =

Castle ruins in Yamakita, Kanagawa, Japan

- 河村城
- Yamakita, Kanagawa Japan
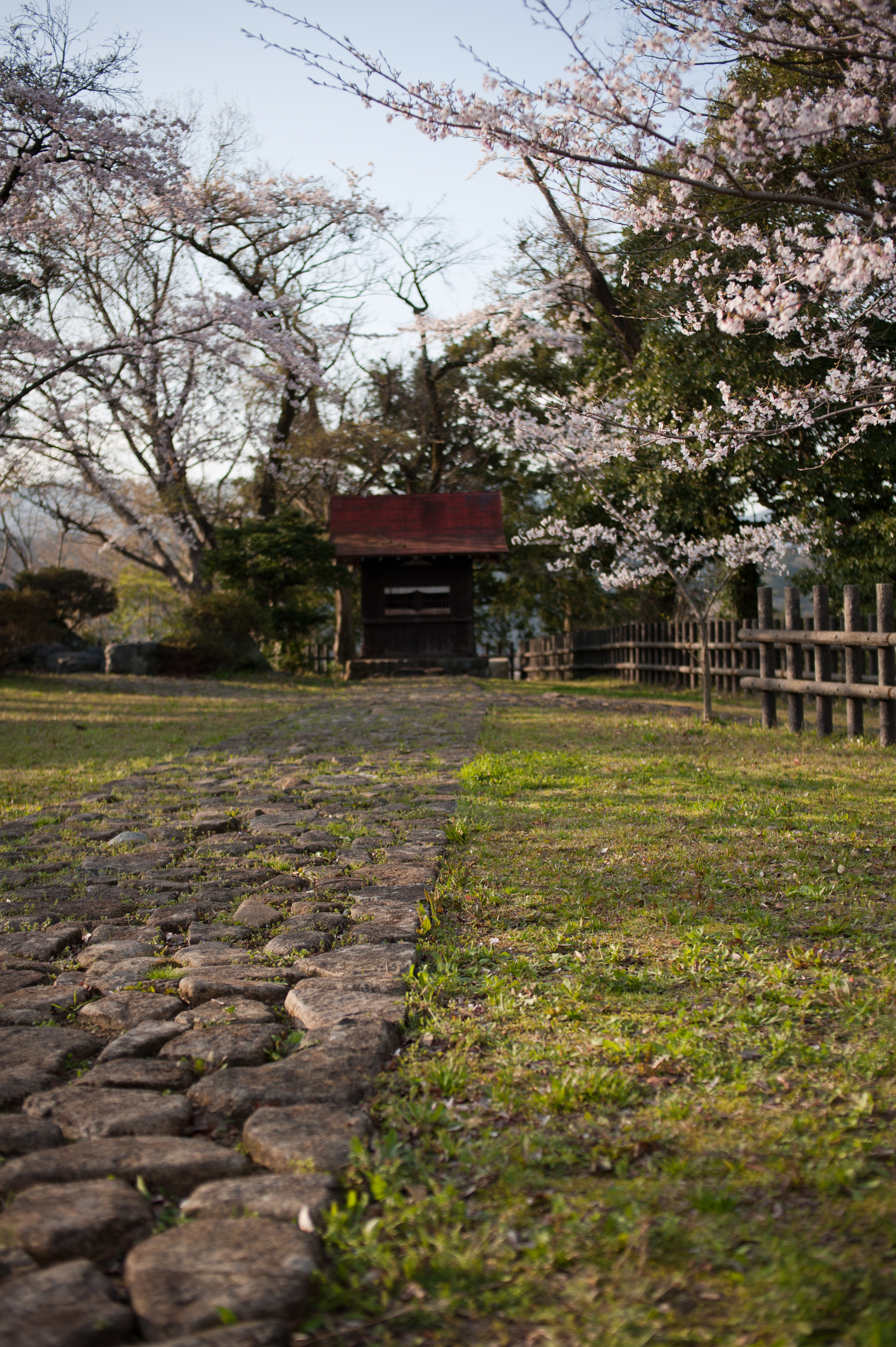
- Kawamura Castle main enclosure

Site information
- Type: yamajiro-style Japanese castle
- Open to the public: yes
- Condition: Archaeological and designated prefectural historical site; castle ruins

Location
- Location within Kanagawa Prefecture Location within Japan
- Coordinates: 35°21′20.9″N 139°04′37.6″E

Site history
- Built by: c.Kawamura Hidetaka
- In use: Heian - Sengoku period
- Kanagawa Prefecture Historic Site

Kawamura Castle (河村城, Kawamura-jō) is a Kamakura period Japanese castle located in what is now the town of Yamakita, Kanagawa Prefecture, Japan. Its ruins have been protected as a Kanagawa Prefectural Historic Site since 1996. It is said to have been built in the late Heian period and was a mountain castle built near a strategic point where the borders of Sagami, Kai, and Suruga Provinces intersected.

== Overview ==
Kawamura Castle is said to have been built in the late Heian period by Kawamura Hidetaka, a descendant of Fujiwara no Hidesato. It is located on Shiroyama hill at an elevation of 150 meters, just south of center of current Yamakita town. It controls the three routes across the Hakone Mountains connecting the Kantō region with western Japan, the Hakone Pass, Ashigara Pass and a narrow valley which runs along the Sakawagawa river. Kawamura Castle was a typical yamajiro fortress built to take advantage of the uneven terrain of a mountain, making it difficult for enemies to attack. Near the summit, there are numerous interconnected enclosures (kuruwa) protected by earthen ramparts and dry moats. Mountain castles were only used during wartime; normally, people lived on the flat land at the foot of the mountain. At Kawamura Castle, the southern foot of the mountain (present-day Kishi district) was the living area, and the ruins known as the Kawamura Yakata Ato (Kawamura Residence Site) remain.

Per the Azuma Kagami, during the Battle of Ishibashiyama between Minamoto no Yoritomo and Heike clan, Kawamura Hidetaka's son, Yoshihide, sided with the Heike and had his territory confiscated. However, he later demonstrated his skill in yabusame mounted archery to Yoritomo in Kamakura and was able to regain his original territory. Furthermore, Yoshihide's younger brother, Hidekiyo, accompanied Yoritomo on his conquest of Ōshū and, received territory in what is now Iwate Prefecture to become the ancestor of the Ōshū Kawamura clan.

Per the Taiheiki during the Kenmu Restoration and the Nanboku-chō period, the Kawamura clan cooperated with the Nitta clan and sided with the Southern Court, confronting Ashikaga Takauji. For two years from 1352, Kawamura Hidekuni and Kawamura Hidetsune, along with Nitta Yoshioki and Wakiya Yoshiharu, withstood attacks by Ashikaga Takauji's army, led by Hatakeyama Kunikiyo at this castle. However, after being defeated in the Battle of Nanbara, the castle fell, and many members of the Kawamura clan were killed. Nitta Yoshioki and Wakiya Yoshiharu fled to Kai Province via Nakagawa Castle. Afterward, the castle came under the control of Hatakeyama Kunikiyo, then Uesugi Norizane (the Kantō kanrei), and finally Omori Noriyori (the younger brother of Ujiyori), a retainer of Ashikaga Mochiuji.

During the Sengoku period, it came under the control of the Late Hōjō clan. During the Genki era (1570-1573), it was reinforced during the invasion of Kai Province by Takeda Shingen, and there was a struggle for control of this castle, along with other surrounding castles, between the Later Hōjō and Takeda clans. In 1590, during Toyotomi Hideyoshi's siege of Odawara, the castle fell and was abandoned.

Currently, the site is maintained as Kawamura Castle Ruins Historical Park, where remains such as the main keep, other enclosures, and trenches can be seen. It is a 30 minute walk from JR East Gotenba Line Yamakita Station.

== See also ==
- List of Historic Sites of Japan (Kanagawa)

== Literature ==
- De Lange, William (2021). An Encyclopedia of Japanese Castles. Groningen: Toyo Press. pp. 600 pages. ISBN 978-9492722300.
