= List of jukus in Japan =

This is a list of jukus in Japan. There are two types, namely academic or cram schools (focusing on supplementary education and test prep) and nonacademic schools (lessons in swimming, art, and other extracurricular activities).

== Academic juku ==
There are two types of academic juku, yobiko (large cram schools specializing in entrance exams) and general academic schools.

=== Yobiko ===
- Yoyogi Seminar: has about 30 branch schools and 7 affiliates.
- Yozemi TV Net Phone
- Flex Sateline
- Kawaijuku Also has a satellite TV course and a license program for professionals such as financial planners and stock analysts.
- Sundai Yobiko Offers video lecture courses in which students watch the videos and submit their tests and assignments to the company for grading.
- Toshin Yobiko Offers homeschooling courses and broadcasts lectures to 800 satellite schools all over Japan.
- Eikoh Seminar Offers online courses.
- Nichino-ken Specializes in junior high entrance examinations, but also offers private tutoring from 1st grade to high school. Has 84 branch schools, 61 of them in the Tokyo Metropolitan area.
- Yotsuya-Otsuka Specializes in junior high schools, especially prestigious ones like Kaisei, Azabu, and Musashi for boys and Ouin, Joshigakuin, and Futaba for girls. Has 13 branch schools in the Kanto region.

=== General academic juku ===
==== Prep schools for Daigaku-Kentei exam ====
The Daigaku-Kentei is a test sanctioned by the Education Ministry as a prerequisite for entering university where applicants do not have a formal high school diploma from a local public or private school. Schools that prepare people for this exam include:

- Hokkaido Daikin Academy (post junior high)
- Daiichi Koutou Gakuin Sapporo school (post junior high)
- Tokyo Academy Sendai School (post junior high)
- Tohoku Daiken Senmon Yobiko (post junior high)
- Mito Koutou Gakuin (post junior high)
- Kibougaoka Gakuin (15 - 20 year olds)
- Kawai Juku ECosmo (15 years old - )
- Shingakukai Yobiko (13 years old - )
- Yotsuya Gakuin Yotsuya School (15 years old - )
- Nichii Gakkan, Daikin Kouza (15 years old - )
- Daikin ESundai Open School
- Asahi Koutou Gakuin (after finishing junior high)
- Gakuryoku Kai
- Chuo Koutou Gakuin
- Daiichi Koutou Gakuin Headquarters
- Yoyogi Seminar Sendagaya Bypass School (post junior high)
- Daiichi Koutou Gakuin Tachikawa School (post junior high)
- Yokohama Sogou College
- Daiichi Koutou Gakuin Yokohama School (post junior high)
- Daikin Junbigou Weds (post junior high school)
- Kawai Juku Cosmo Chubu-chiku Cosmo Course (15 years old - )
- Goal Free Kobetsu Kyouiku Yobiko G.I.P. (junior high - )
- Kyoto Kokusai Yobiko (KIPS)
- Osaka YMCA Free School (Post junior high)
- Kansai Koutou Gakuen (15 years old - )
- Rivasu Academy Shiyu-juku, Osaka School (12 years old- )
- Rivasu Academy Siyu-juku, Kobe School (12 years old -)
- Daiei Daikin Juken Center (post junior high)
- Hihon Career Up Seminar Yamaguchi School
- Utsunomiya Study Room (15 years old - )
- Daikin Seminar (16 years old - )
- Tosemi

==== Large-chain juku ====
The strong selling point of the cram schools in this category is their original published materials.

- Sundai Preparatory School
- Kumon Offers courses in Japanese, math and English for up to high school students.
- Gakken Kyoushitsu
- Ōshū Corporation

==== Other juku ====
- Z Kai A correspondence course for mostly high school students.
- Shinken Zemi A correspondence course from infants to high school students, with the latter getting to choose to take one subject or five a year.
- Dorazemi Caters to first and second graders.
- Leaders School Monolith A Nagoya-based company that "a full year’s worth of experiment-based programs for primary school students called “Kids Lab”. The aim is to help children cultivate an ability to think by themselves through experiments in physics, chemistry, biology and geoscience, helping make up for the decrease in science-related class hours at schools."
