= Japanese ship Ashigara =

At least two naval ships of Japan have been named Ashigara:

- Japanese cruiser Ashigara, a Myoko-class cruiser of the Imperial Japanese Navy, named after the mountain
- JS Ashigara (DDG-178), an Atago-class destroyer of the Japan Maritime Self-Defense Force
