= Fukasawa Castle =

Castle ruins in Gotemba, Japan

- 深沢城
- Gotemba, Shizuoka, Japan
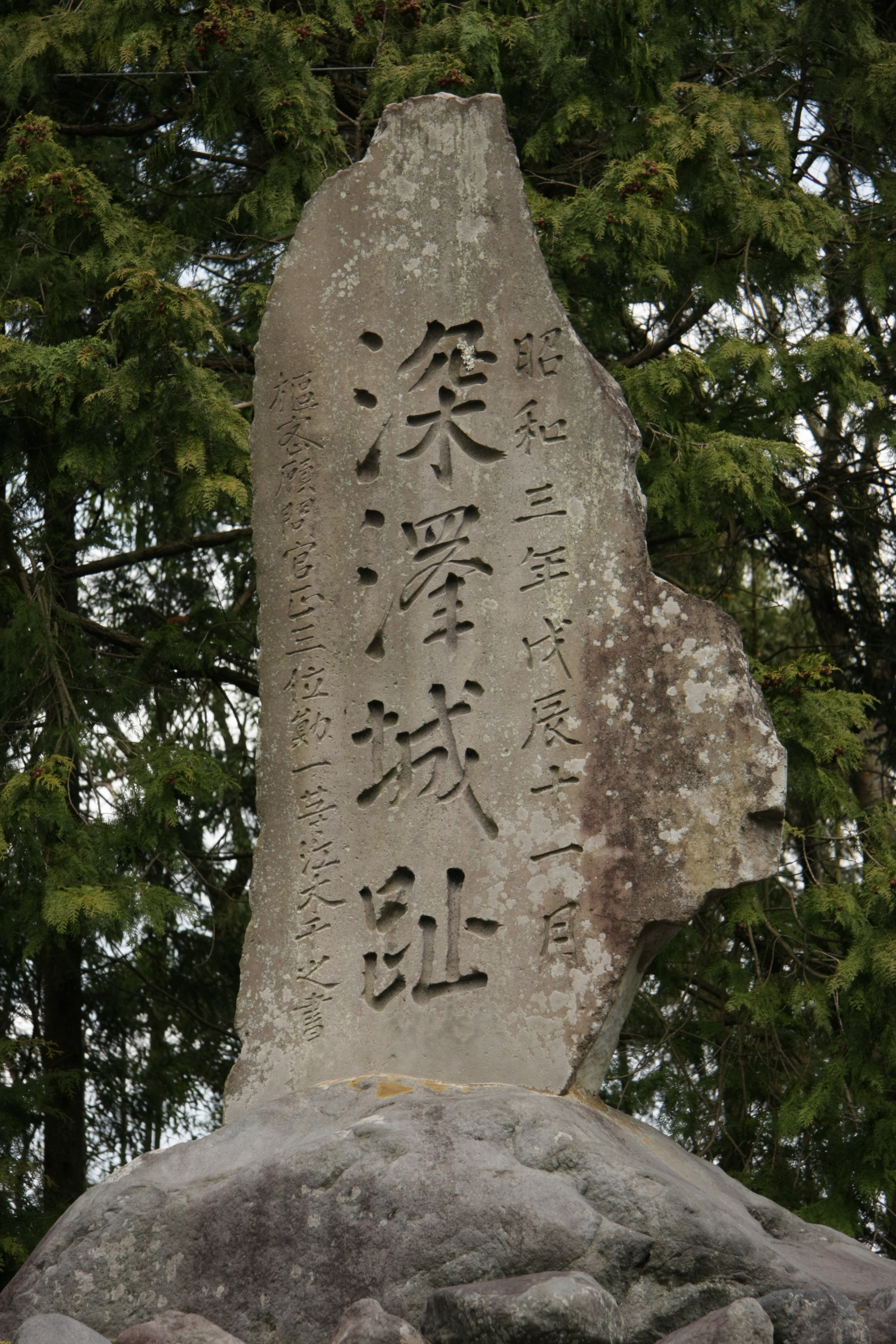
- Fukasawa Castle ruins monument

Site information
- Type: Japanese castle
- Controlled by: Imagawa clan, Takeda clan, Tokugawa clan
- Condition: ruins

Location
- Fukasawa Castle Fukasawa Castle (Japan)
- Coordinates: 35°19′19.0″N 138°57′19.6″E

Site history
- Built: 15th century
- Demolished: 1590
- Shizuoka Prefecture Historic Site

Fukasawa Castle (深沢城Fukasawa-jō) was a Sengoku period flatland-style Japanese castle located in what is now the city of Gotemba, Shizuoka prefecture. The ruins have been protected as a Shizuoka Prefectural Historic Site since 1960.

== History ==
Fukazawa Castle is located near the border of former Suruga and Sagami Provinces, on a hill at the confluence of the Mabushigawa and Nukigawa rivers. It was a multi-enclosure structure measuring approximately 300 meters from east-to-west and 400 meters from north-to-south, with each of the three main enclosures protected by dry moats and connected by bridges. Its origins are uncertain, but it is believed to be either a stronghold of the local Fukasawa clan or a castle built in the early 16th century by Imagawa Ujichika of the Imagawa clan to defend the border and a major road. According to historical records, Hōjō Ujimasa rebuilt the castle in 1569 and appointed Hōjō Tsunashige as its castellan. At the end of that year, Takeda Shingen led a large army to besiege it, and in 1571, Hōjō Tsunashige withdrew, bringing it under the control of the Takeda clan. During this siege, the Takeda forces did not employ a direct assault, but used psychological warfare tactics such as sending arrows with messages to urge surrender or to lower the morale of the defenders. The Takeda also brought gold miners from Kai Province as sappers. The castle was subsequently used by the Takeda until March 1582, where it was on the frontlines against the late Hōjō clan at Ashigara Castle. In March 1582, the coalition between Oda Nobunaga and Tokugawa Ieyasu decisively defeated the Takeda clan, and Fukazawa Castle was razed by fire.

Later, when Tokugawa Ieyasu became master of the surrounding territory, Fukazawa Castle was rebuilt and continued to serve as a defense against the Odawara-based late Hōjō clan. Mitake Yasusada was castellan. After the fall of Odawara in 1590, the castle was allowed to fall into ruins.

The only remaining structures today are a portion of the circular outworks and the crescent-shaped moat in front of them, which were constructed by Takeda rule; the majority of the site is now privately owned farmland and residential land.

The castle ruins are a 30-minute walk from JR Central Gotenba Line Ashigara Station.

== Gallery ==
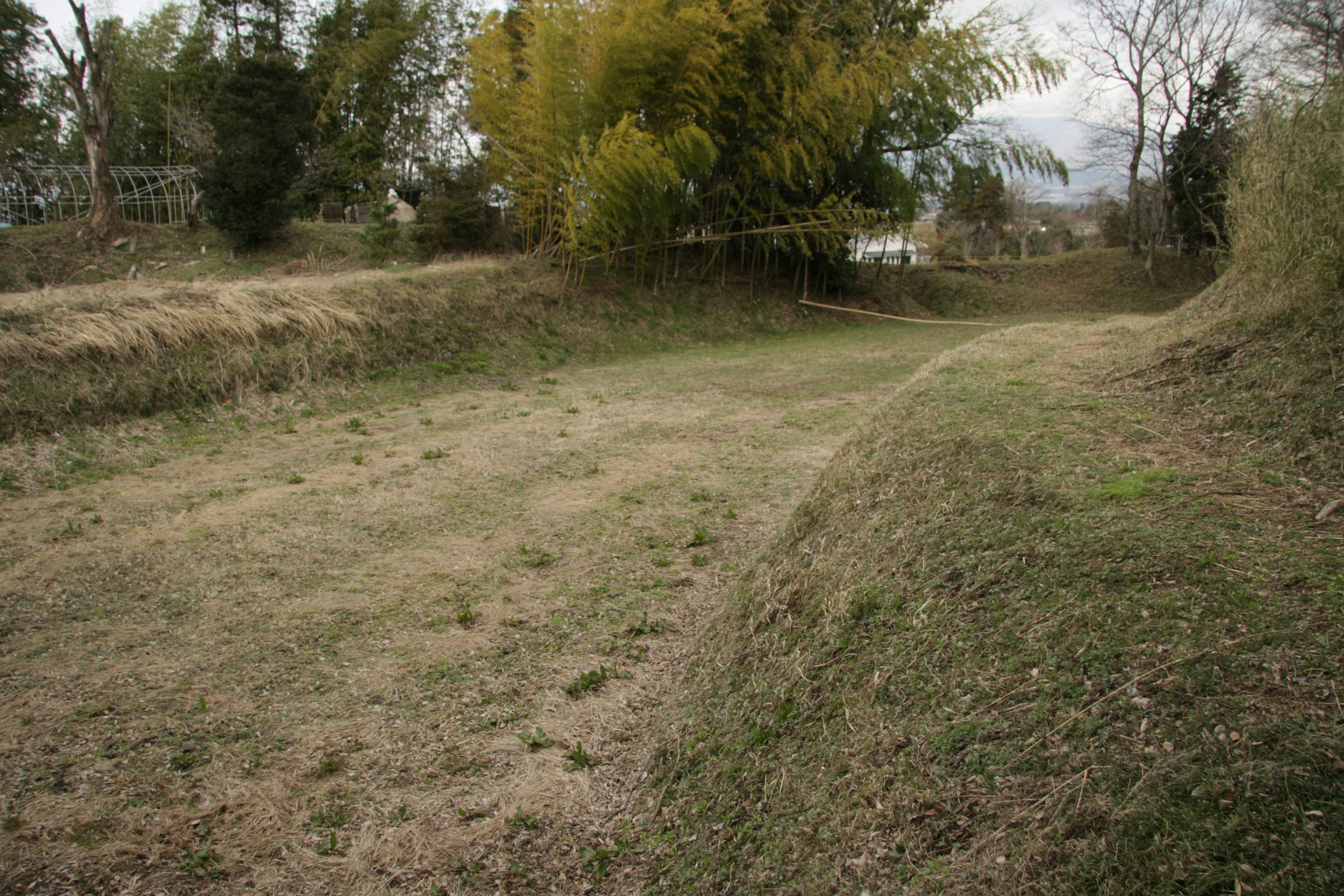
Crescent-shaped moat

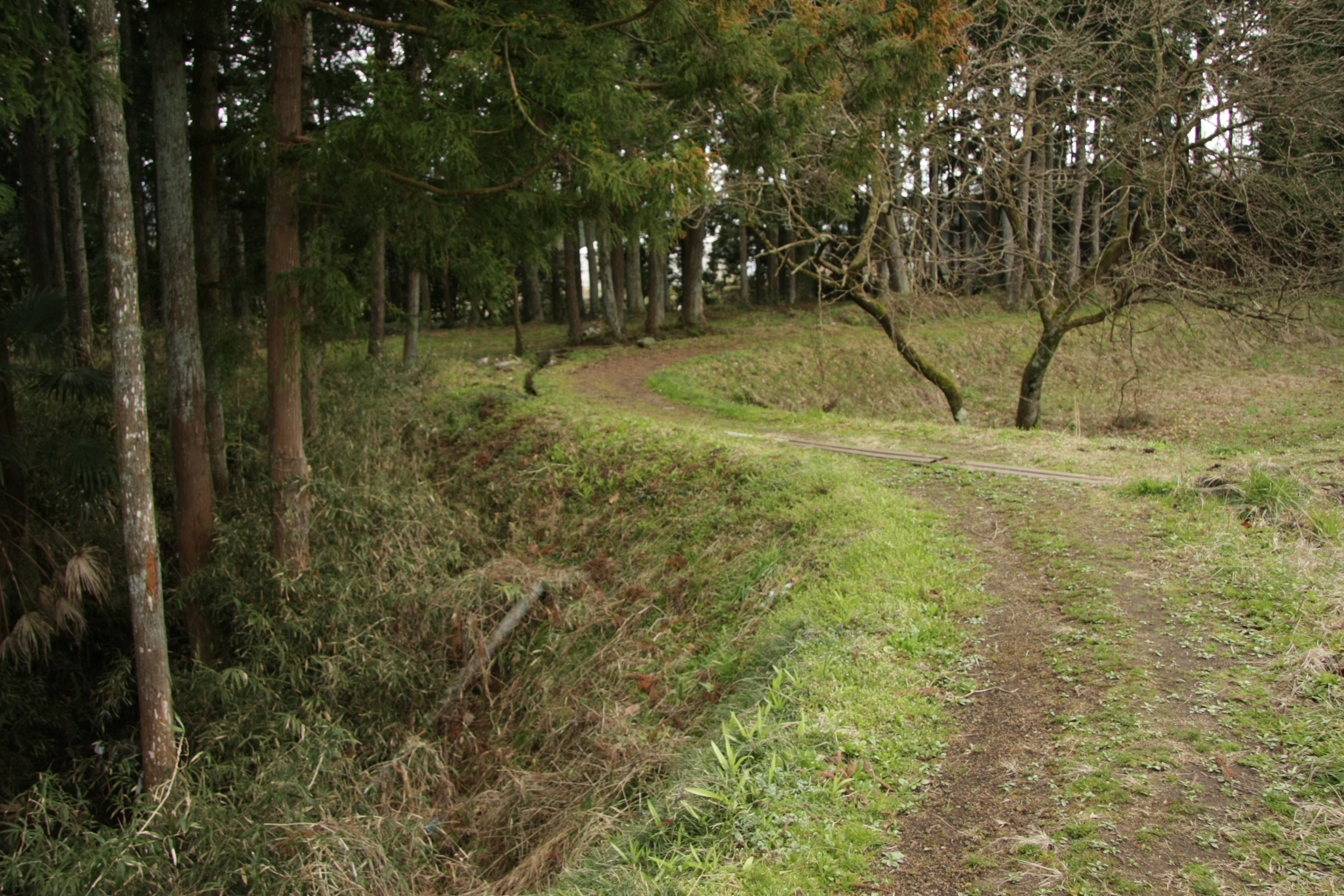
Earthen rampart

== See also ==
- List of Historic Sites of Japan (Shizuoka)
