= Auckland International College =

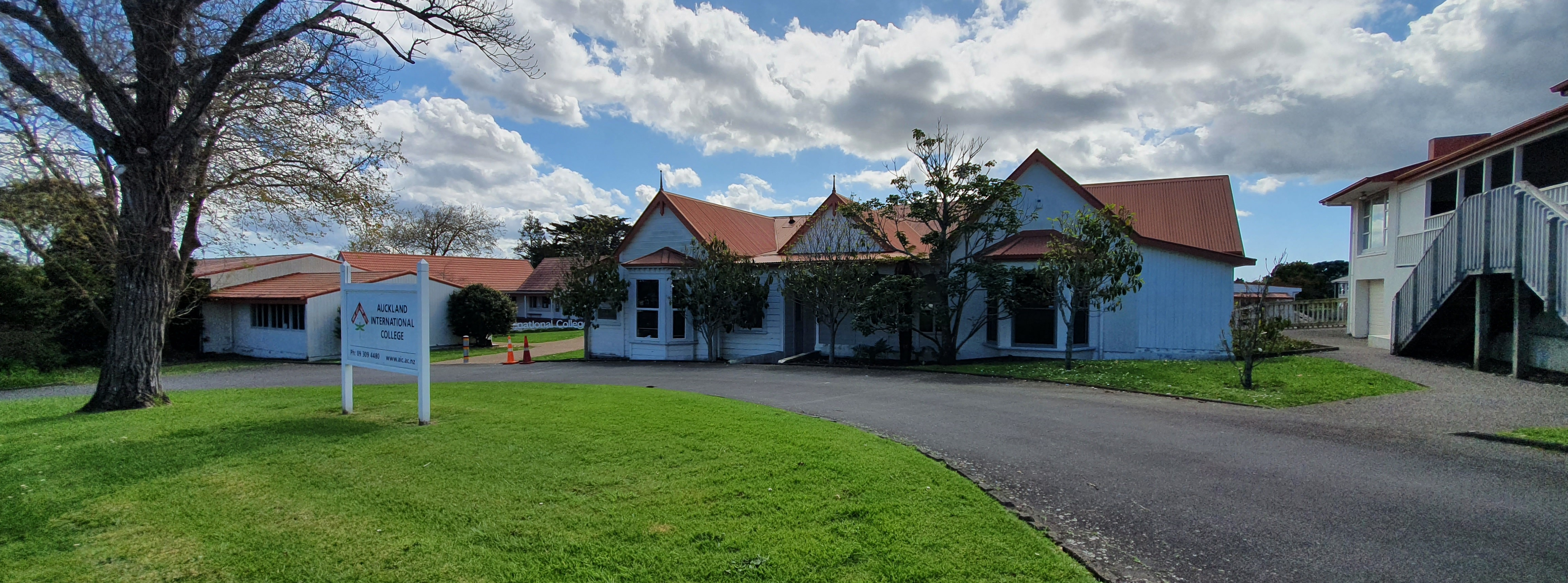

Location
- 37 Heaphy Street, Blockhouse Bay, Auckland 0600; 36.92235°S 174.69764°E

Information
- Type: Private: Fully Reg. Co-Ed Secondary (Year 11–13) with Boarding Facilities, accredited IB World School.
- Motto: Pathway to the world
- Established: July 2003
- Closed: 31 May 2023
- Ministry of Education Institution no.: 473
- Principal: Mike Parry
- Socio-economic decile: n/a
- Website: aic.ac.nz

Auckland International College was an independent coeducational secondary school in Auckland, New Zealand. AIC was established by a Japanese educational for-profit corporation, Oshu Corporation. It adopted the IB Diploma Programme as its sole curriculum plus a preparation year programme for the course (year 11). The school ran with a Northern Hemisphere timetable. AIC also offered a six-month course running from January to June for international students whose English is not at a high enough level to embark on the year 11 preparation year programme. The AIC English course for senior secondary studies covered all curriculum subjects, developing and improving English language skills required for further study in a New Zealand classroom. The Japanese for-profit corporation, Oshu Corporation, that owned the school permanently closed the school in 2023 due to difficulty attracting international students.

== History ==
- July 2003: AIC was established by a Japanese educational for-profit corporation, Oshu Corporation; Carolyn Solomon was appointed as principal.
- January 2006: Craig Monaghan took over as principal of AIC; Carolyn Solomon moved into the role of Executive Principal.
- December 2006: Craig Monaghan resigned as principal; Roger Lewis was acting principal from January to April 2007.
- April 2007: Anne Willmann was appointed as AIC's new principal.
- June 2009: Mike Parry was appointed as AIC's new principal.
- 2009: Agnes Chan was appointed as AIC's president.
- 2011: Construction was started at new building for school in Blockhouse Bay and for boarding house in Avondale.
- January 2012: School was moved into new building in Blockhouse Bay.
- April 2013: Carolyn Solomon was re-appointed as principal.
- July 2017: Mike Parry was re-appointed as principal.
- 29 October 2021: Due to the COVID-19 pandemic, Principal Mike Parry announced that the school would be permanently closed in June 2023, 20 years after its foundation.

== Curriculum ==
- International Baccalaureate:
  - Year 11: Pre IB Programme
  - Year 12 and 13: IB Diploma Programme
