= Mount Ashigara =

Mountain in Japan

Ashigara
- Mount Kintoki
- View from Hakone

Highest point
- Elevation: 1,213 m (3,980 ft)
- Parent peak: Mount Hakone
- Listing: Mountains of Japan
- Coordinates: 35°17′23″N 139°00′17″E

Geography
- Location within Japan
- Country: Japan
- Prefectures: Kanagawa and Shizuoka
- City/Town: Minamiashigara and Oyama

Geology
- Mountain type: stratovolcano

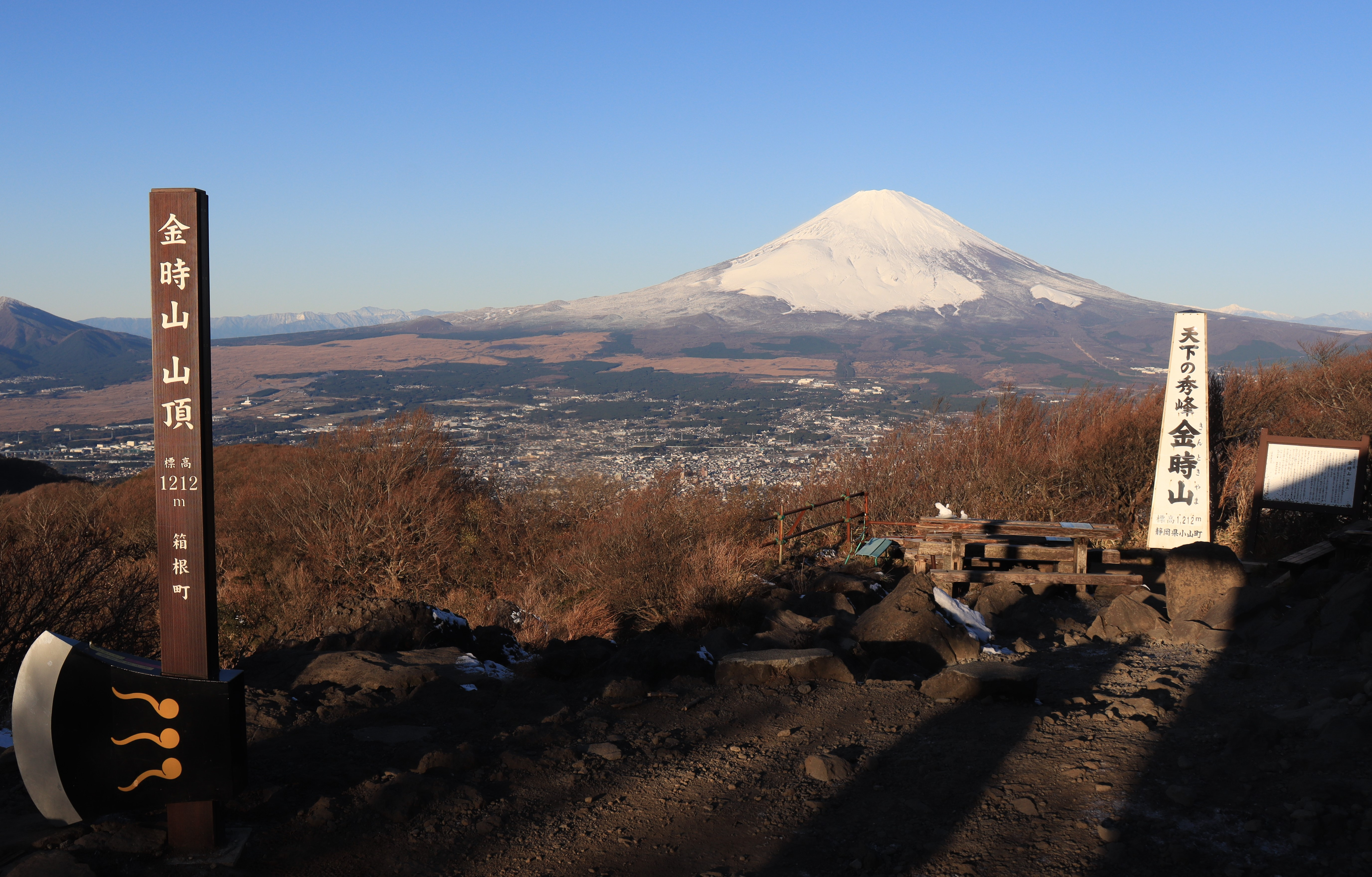
Mount Fuji from Mount Kintoki.

Mount Ashigara (足柄山), also known as Mount Kintoki (金時山), is the northernmost peak of the Hakone caldera, on the border of Kanagawa and Shizuoka prefectures, in the Fuji-Hakone-Izu National Park in Japan. Ashigara is not a remnant of the collapse of the old Hakone volcano itself, but rather a parasitic cone growing from its flank.

Mount Ashigara is the legendary birthplace of Kintarō.

== Etymology ==
The kanji of the mountain's name mean "Leg Handle Mountain", but the written form is ateji, meaning that the kanji were applied phonetically, and not for any symbolic representation of the mountain's characteristics or history. In old songs it is spelled out phonetically as asigari (阿之賀利) or asigara (安思我良).

== Access ==
Hakone side

- 90 minutes' walk from Sengoku bus stop

Gotemba side

- 120 minutes' walk from Otome Toge bus stop

Minami Ashigara side

- 90 minutes' walk from Ashigara Pass
- 120 minutes' walk from Jizodo bus stop

== See also ==
- Kintoki
- Ashigara Pass
- Japanese cruiser Ashigara
- JDS Ashigara (DDG-178)
- Media related to Mount Kintoki at Wikimedia Commons
