= Hakone Pass =

Mountain pass in Japan

Coordinates: 35°10′55″N 139°00′50″E

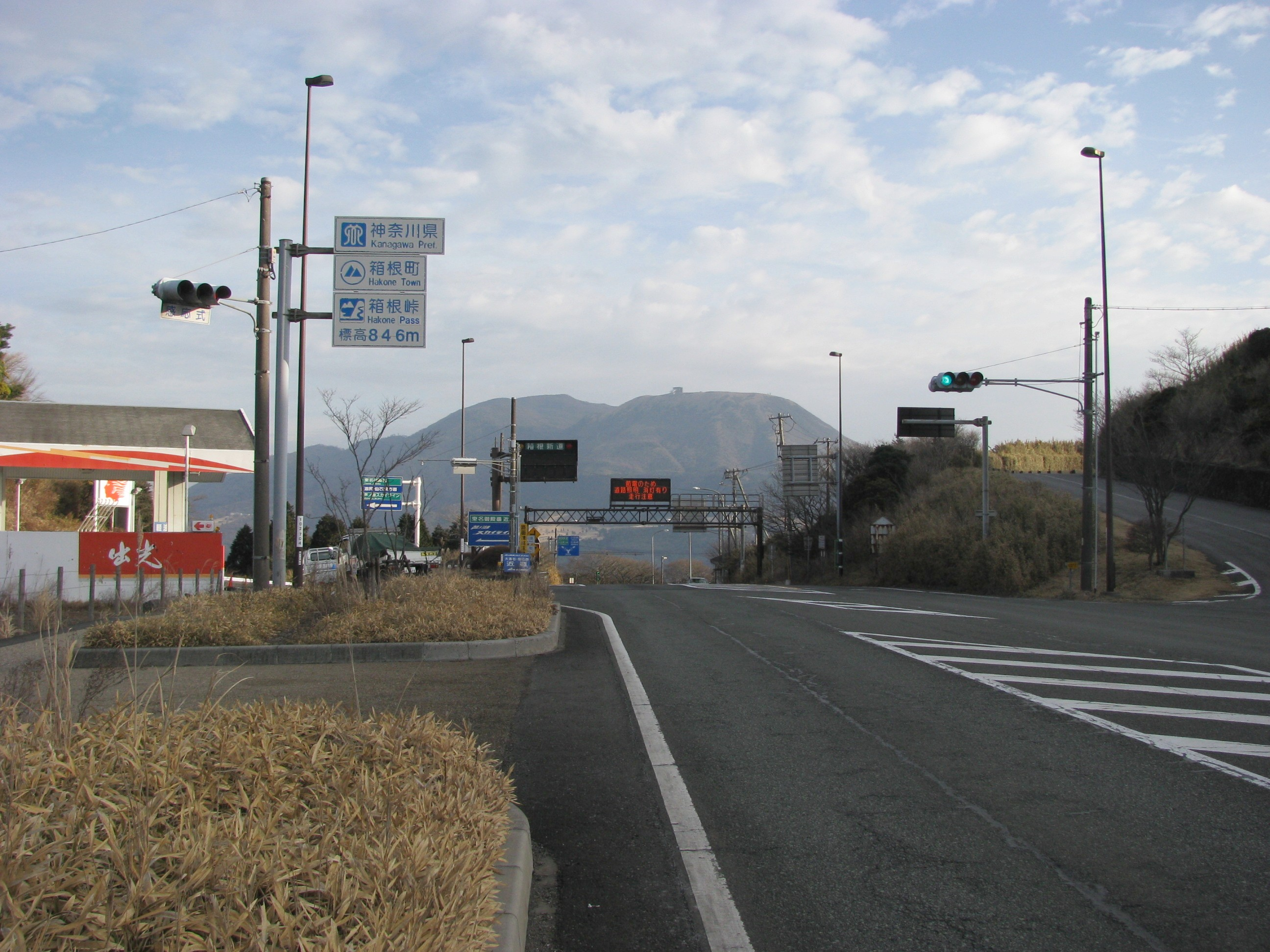
The Hakone Pass on National Route 1, Japan

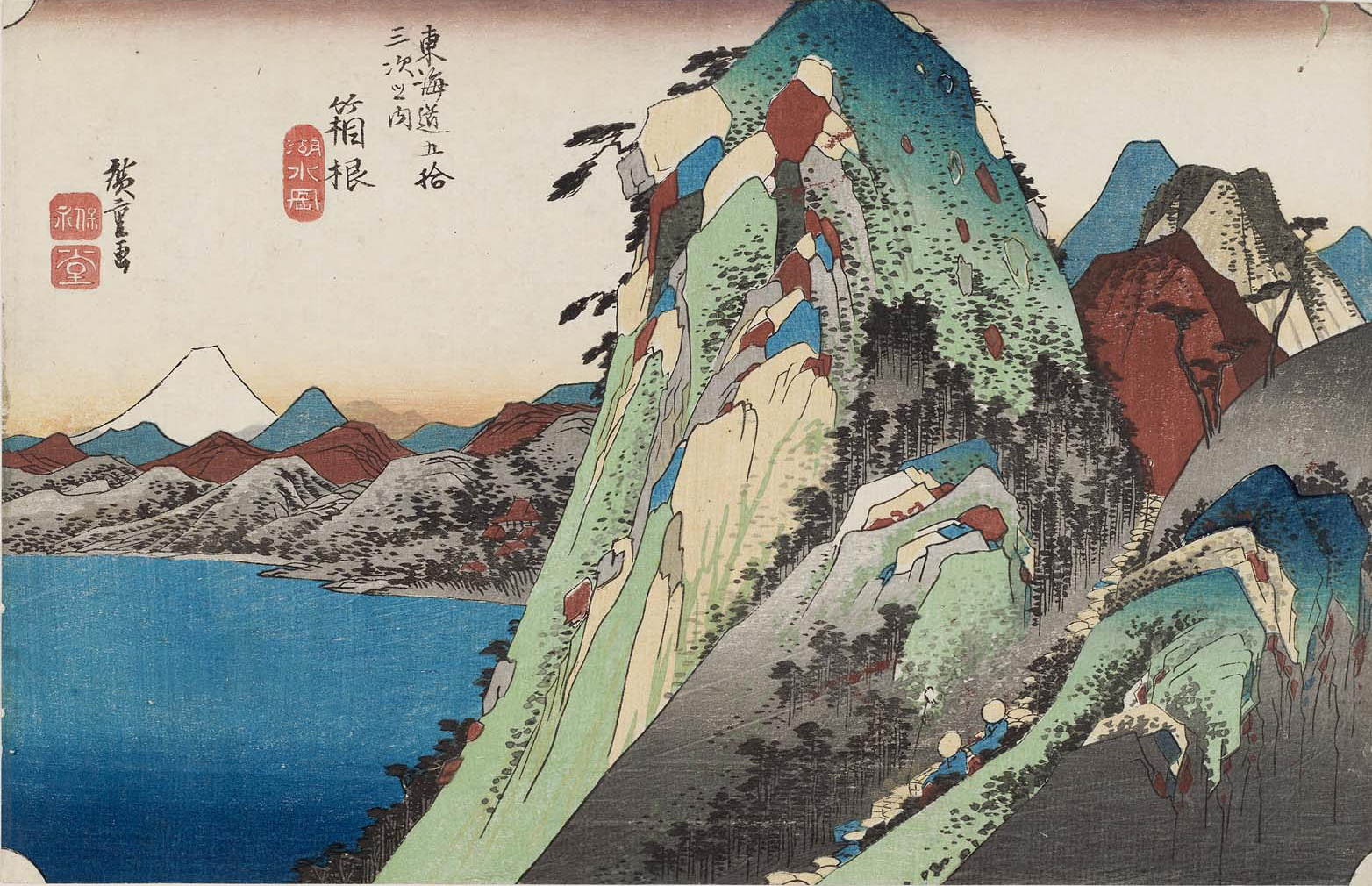
The travellers are walking up toward the Hakone Pass in the Hakone-juku of Hiroshige's Fifty-three Stations of the Tōkaidō.

The Hakone Pass (Japanese: 箱根峠) is a mountain pass located between Hakone, Kanagawa, and Kannami, Shizuoka, Japan. It is in the Hakone Mountains and its elevation, 846 meters above sea level.

== General ==
The Hakone Pass has been an important pass that must be crossed for transportation between Kanto and Kansai, Japan's two population centers, and is described in Hakone Station of Hokusai's Fifty-three Stations of the Tōkaidō. Today, National Route 1 passes through it, although the new Tomei Expressway completely bypasses it by going via Gotenba between the Hakone Mountains and Mount Fuji.

Nearby the pass is Hakone Pass Roadside Station, owned by Hakone Town.

== Transportation ==
- National Route 1
- Hakone Shindō
- Ashinoko Skyline (ja:芦ノ湖スカイライン)
- Shizuoka Prefectural Route 20 (ja:静岡県道20号)

== See also ==
- Hakone Barrier
