= Juku =

Cram schools in Japan

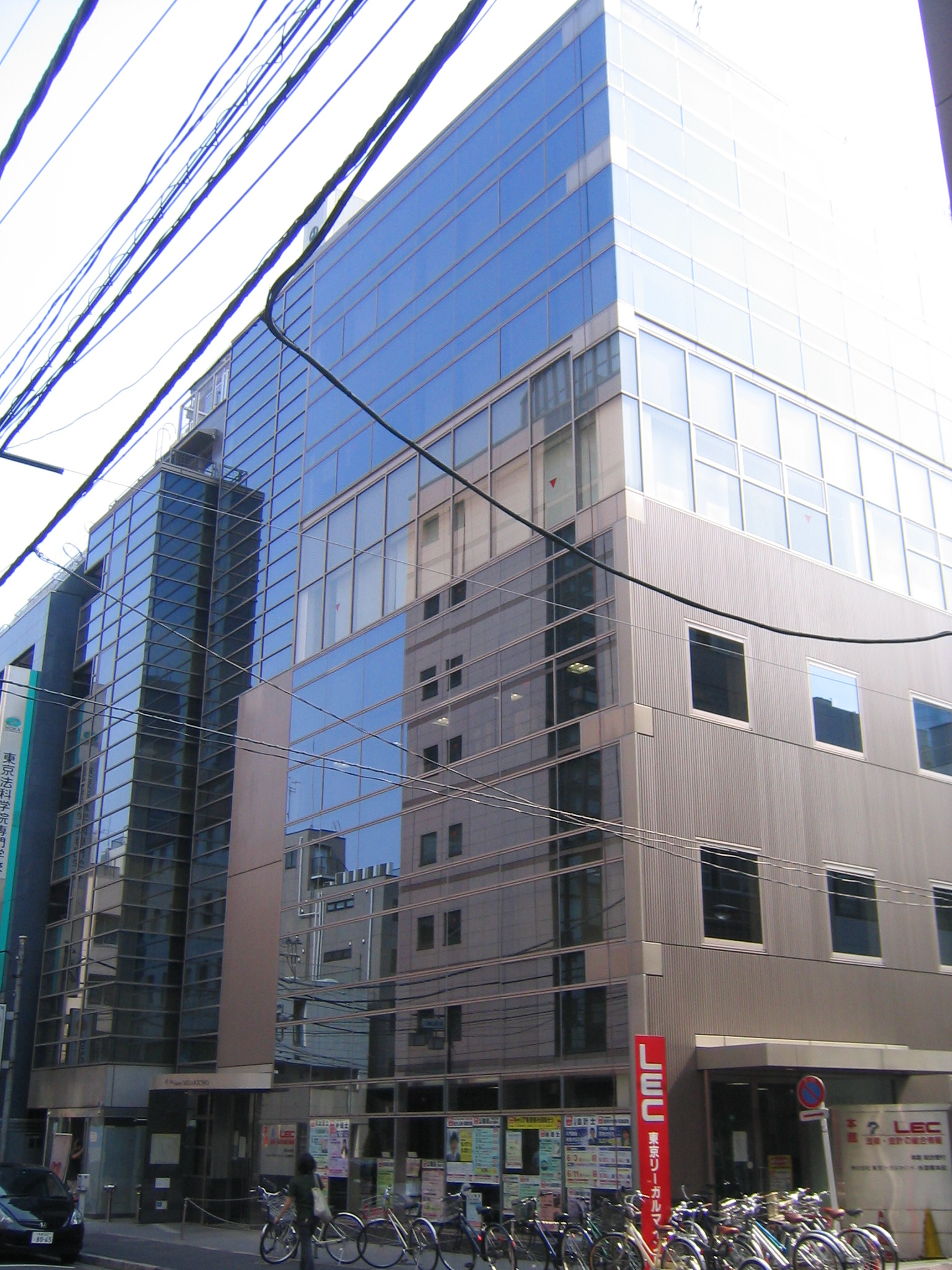
LEC, one cram school company in Japan

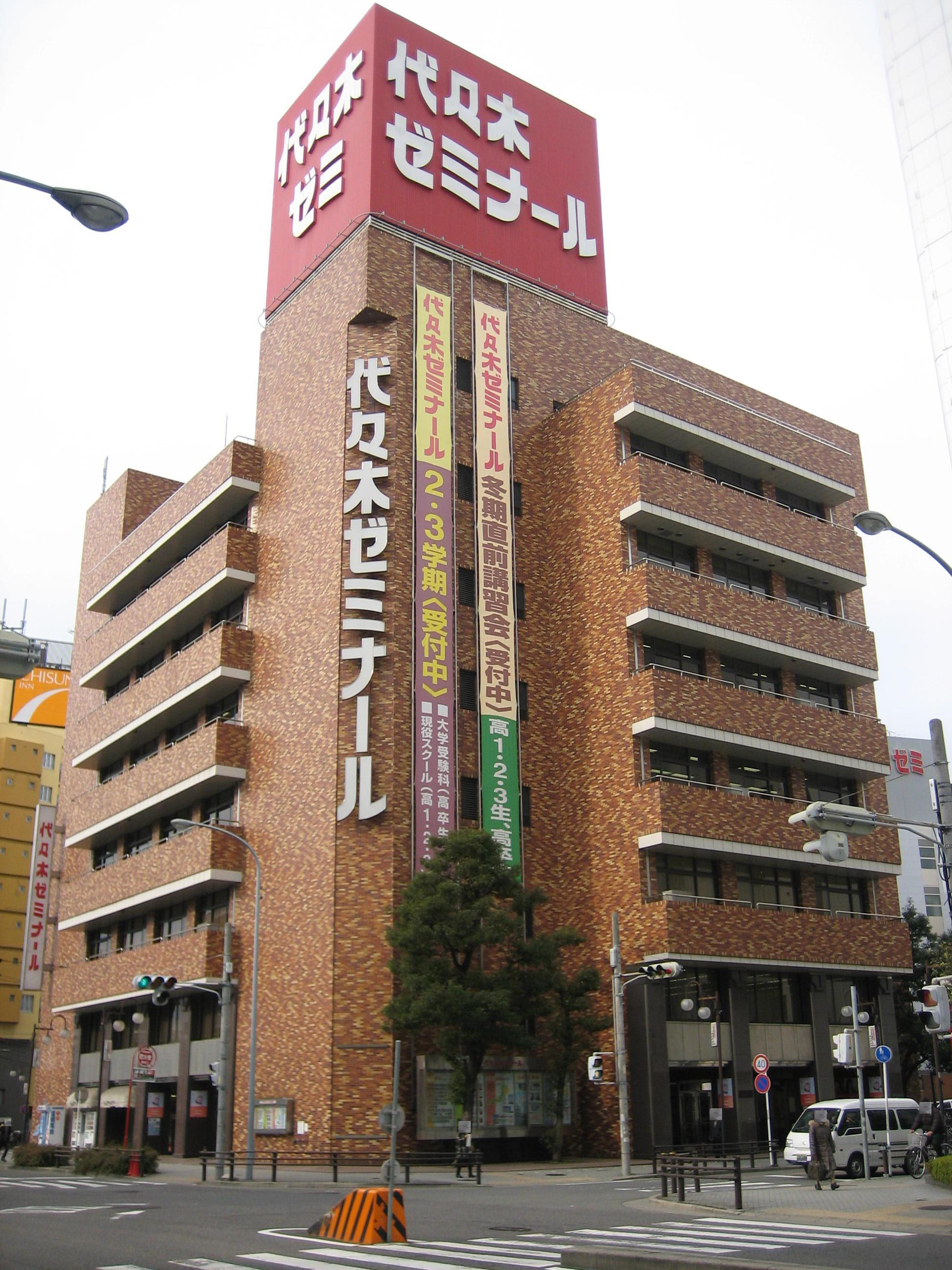
The Nagoya office of Yoyogi Seminar

Gakushū juku (Japanese: 学習塾; see cram school) are private, fee-paying schools that offer supplementary classes often in preparation for key school and university entrance exams. The term is primarily used to characterize such schools in Japan. Juku typically operate after regular school hours, on weekends, and during school vacations.

== History ==
Juku attendance rose from the 1970s through the mid-1980s; participation rates increased at every grade level throughout the compulsory education years. This phenomenon was a source of great concern to the Ministry of Education, which issued directives to the regular schools that it hoped would reduce the need for after-school lessons, but these directives had little practical effect. Some juku have branches in the United States and other countries to help children living abroad catch up with students in Japan.

While new media have been introduced into juku as instructional and delivery methods, traditional teaching is increasingly shifting to individual tutoring. This shift is partly a response by the supplementary education industry to declining numbers of children in Japan and the threat this decline poses to their industry.

== Structure and curriculum ==
There are two types of juku, academic and nonacademic.

=== Academic juku ===
Academic juku can be roughly divided into categories.

- Locally based middle- or small-sized cram schools
- Schools for salvaging dropouts or children who avoid regular school (free schools, etc.)
- Franchising cram schools
- Other miscellaneous types of cram schools

As of 2011, almost one in five children in their first year of primary school attended after-class instruction, rising to nearly all university-bound high schoolers. The fees are around ¥260,000 ($3,300) annually.

Academic juku offer instruction in the five required subjects: mathematics, Japanese language, science, English, and social studies. They are best known and most widely publicized for their role as "cram schools", where children (sent by concerned parents) can study to improve scores on upper-secondary school entrance examinations. However, as seen above, there are also juku that provide supplementary education, whether remedial courses to help children falling behind in their studies, refresher courses to explain material in further detail, or courses that cover material on a higher level and thus appeal to children bored by the standardized class structure.

=== Nonacademic juku ===
Many other children, particularly younger children, attend nonacademic juku for piano lessons, English conversation, art instruction, Japanese calligraphy (shodō), swimming, and abacus (soroban) lessons.

== Social influence ==
Juku also play a social role, and children in Japan say they like going to juku because they are able to make new friends. Many children ask to be sent because their friends attend. Some children seem to like juku because of the closer personal contact they have with their teachers and, for students in crowded spaces like Tokyo in particular, the relief jukus can provide from small homes, family, television, Internet, and other distractions.

== Controversy ==
=== Criticism ===
Because of the commercial nature of most juku, some critics argue that they have profit rather than education at heart. Shares in five juku chains are traded publicly, and 25 others were as of 1992 ready to issue stock as well.

Not all students can afford to attend juku, but school and university test scores rise in direct proportion to spending on juku. The average fee is $160 a month for elementary school and $175 a month for junior high school, but the best ones are several times that amount. Japan spent $10.9 billion on tutoring and cram schools in 1991 alone, including $9 billion on juku for students in the ninth grade or below "almost double the figure spent [in 1985]." With poor students therefore at risk of falling behind, the social and economic inequality in what had been a relatively egalitarian approach to education, at least in public schools through ninth grade, is why Japan's powerful teachers' union does not support the juku institution.

In response to these accusations,

"juku teachers and administrators say that since their schools are profit-making enterprises, they have to guarantee results to succeed. The results are easy to measure since they depend on how many graduates pass the examinations for private school. The profit motive, in other words, provides an incentive to create an atmosphere in which students want to learn."

"The rise of juku is praised as a secret of Japanese success, a healthy reflection of a system of advancement based on merit. It is also criticized as forcing a new generation to surrender its childhood out of an obsession with status and getting ahead. 'Juku are harmful to Japanese education and to children,' said Ikuo Amano, professor of sociology at the University of Tokyo. 'It's not healthy for kids to have so little free time. It is not healthy to become completely caught up in competition and status at such a young age.'"

For some, "the schools are also seen as reinforcing a tradition of rote learning over ingenuity."

=== Merits ===
In many ways, juku compensate for the formal education system's inability or unwillingness to address particular individual problems. "In a 2008 government survey, two-thirds of parents attributed the growing role of juku to shortcomings in public education," such as the abolition of Saturday schooling (which therefore reduces the number of hours available to cover course material) and the reduction of curricular content (see Yutori education).

Juku offer a more personalized service "and many encourage individual inquisitiveness when the public system treats everyone alike. 'The juku are succeeding in ways that the schools are not,' an OECD report says."

== See also ==
- Hagwon, similar word in Korean to describe cram schools in South Korea
- Higher education in Japan
- Kyōiku mama, Japanese pejorative meaning "education mother". Similar to the concept of a "stage mother."
- List of jukus in Japan
- Tiger parenting
- Tuition centres in Singapore
- Yobikō, similar to juku, but partially overseen by Japan's Ministry of Education, and focused on preparing students to take college admission tests.
