= Hakone-juku =

Tenth of the 53 stations of the Tōkaidō in Japan

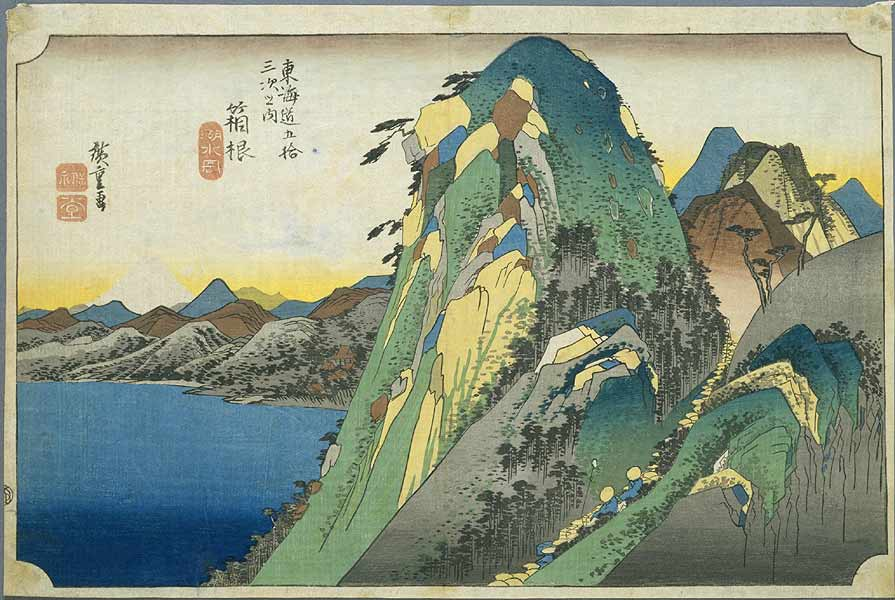
Hakone-juku in the 1830s, as depicted by Hiroshige in The Fifty-three Stations of the Tōkaidō

Hakone-juku (箱根宿, Hakone-juku) was the tenth of the fifty-three stations of the Tōkaidō. It is located in the present-day town of Hakone in Ashigarashimo District, Kanagawa Prefecture, Japan. At an elevation of 725m, it is the highest post station on the entire Tōkaidō and was even difficult for the bakufu to maintain.

== History ==
Hakone-juku was established in 1618, in a small area between Hakone Pass (on Mount Hakone) and the Hakone Checkpoint. The original Hakone-juku was on the Edo (modern-day Tokyo) side of the Hakone Checkpoint; however, the people living there at the time refused to build a honjin to create a new post station. As a result, the post town was developed on the side of the checkpoint heading towards Kyoto. The first settlers in the new post town originally lived in either Odawara-juku or Mishima-shuku, the neighboring post stations, but were forced to Hakone-juku.

== Neighboring post towns ==
Tōkaidō
Odawara-juku – Hakone-juku – Mishima-shuku
