= Oshu =

Oshu or Ōshū may refer to:

- Another name for Mutsu Province, a former Japanese province
- Ōshū, Iwate, Japan, a city
- Northern Fujiwara (Ōshū Fujiwara-shi), a Japanese noble family
- Ōshū Corporation
- Ōshū, "Europe" in Japanese
