= Ashigara Station =

Ashigara Station may refer to:

- Ashigara Station (Kanagawa) in Kanagawa Prefecture, Japan served by the Odakyu Odawara Line.
- Ashigara Station (Shizuoka) in Shizuoka Prefecture, Japan served by the JR Gotemba Line.
