= Mishima-shuku =

Eleventh of the 53 stations of the Tōkaidō in Japan

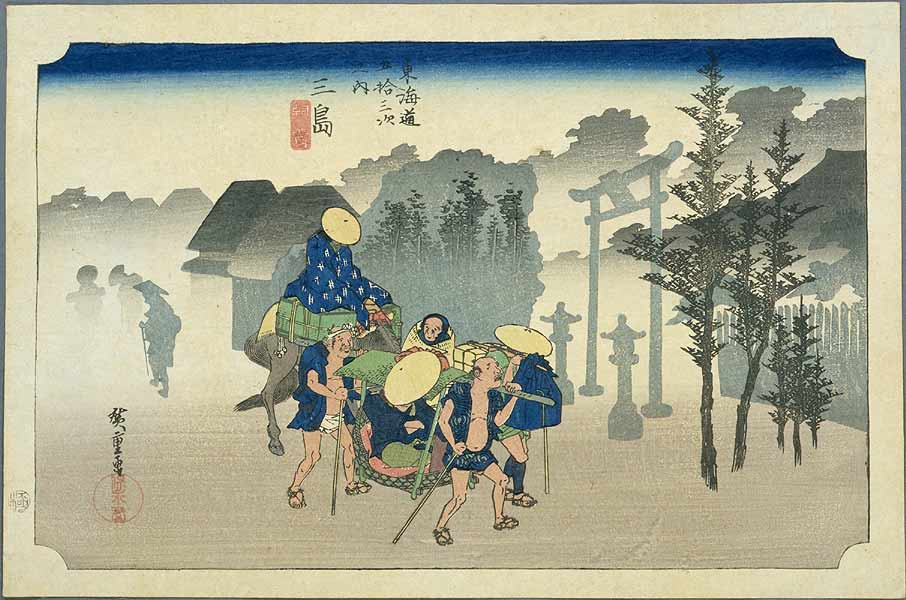
Mishima-shuku in the 1830s, as depicted by Hiroshige in the Hōeidō edition of The Fifty-three Stations of the Tōkaidō (1831–1834)

Mishima-shuku (三島宿, Mishima-shuku) was the eleventh of the fifty-three stations of the Tōkaidō during Edo period Japan. It is located in the present-day city of Mishima, in Shizuoka Prefecture.

== History ==
In Mishima-juku, there were two honjin and 74 other minor inns for travelers. Mishima was the only post station located within Izu Province. Mishima was the traditional provincial capital of Izu from the Nara period and the location of a major Shinto shrine. Until 1759, Mishima was the location of the daikanshō, the seat of government for the hatamoto-class retainer appointed by the Tokugawa shogunate to rule over Izu Province.

Additionally, because water flows from Mount Fuji to the town, it was referred to as the "Capital of Water."

The classic ukiyo-e print by Andō Hiroshige (Hōeidō edition) from 1831 to 1834 depicts travelers setting out in the early morning mists. One is mounted, and the other is traveling by kago. The torii of Mishima Taisha shrine is in the background. By contrast, the Kyōka edition of the late 1830s depicts a snow-covered village, with Mount Fuji in the background.

== Neighboring post towns ==
Tōkaidō
Hakone-juku - Mishima-shuku - Numazu-juku
