= Oyama, Shizuoka =

Oyama 小山町
- Town
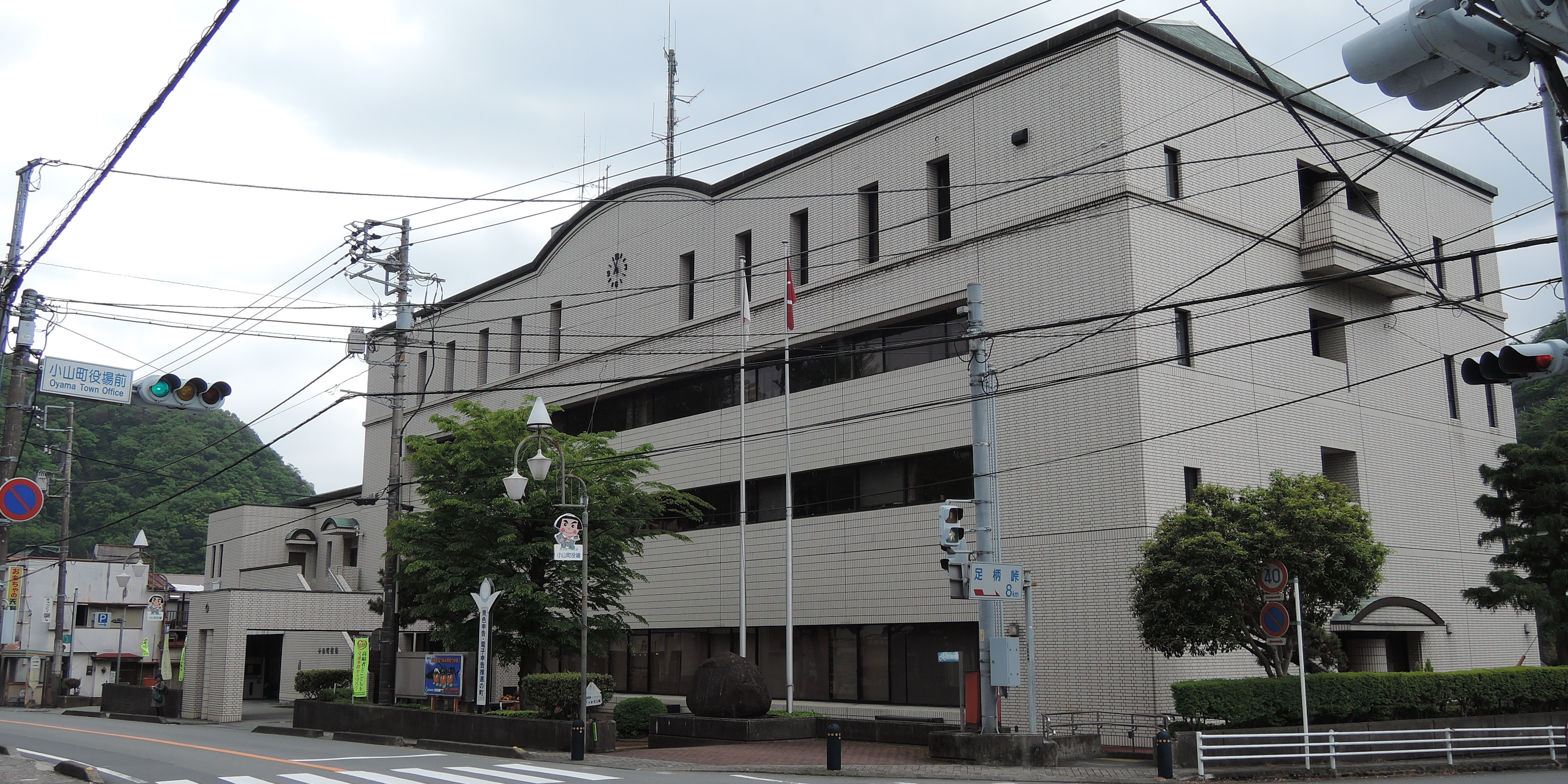
- Oyama Town Hall

- Flag Seal

- Location of Oyama in Shizuoka Prefecture

- Coordinates: 35°21′36.3″N 138°59′14.2″E
- Country: Japan
- Region: Chūbu; Tōkai
- Prefecture: Shizuoka
- District: Suntō

Area
  - Total: 135.74 km^{2} (52.41 sq mi)

Population (July 2019)
  - Total: 18,458
  - Density: 135.98/km^{2} (352.19/sq mi)
- Time zone: UTC+9 (Japan Standard Time)
- Symbols
  - Tree: Sakura
  - Flower: Rapeseed
  - Bird: Japanese bush-warbler
- Phone number: 0550-76-1111
- Address: 57-2 Fujimagari, Oyama-chō, Suntō-gun, Shizuoka-ken 410-1395
- Website: Official website

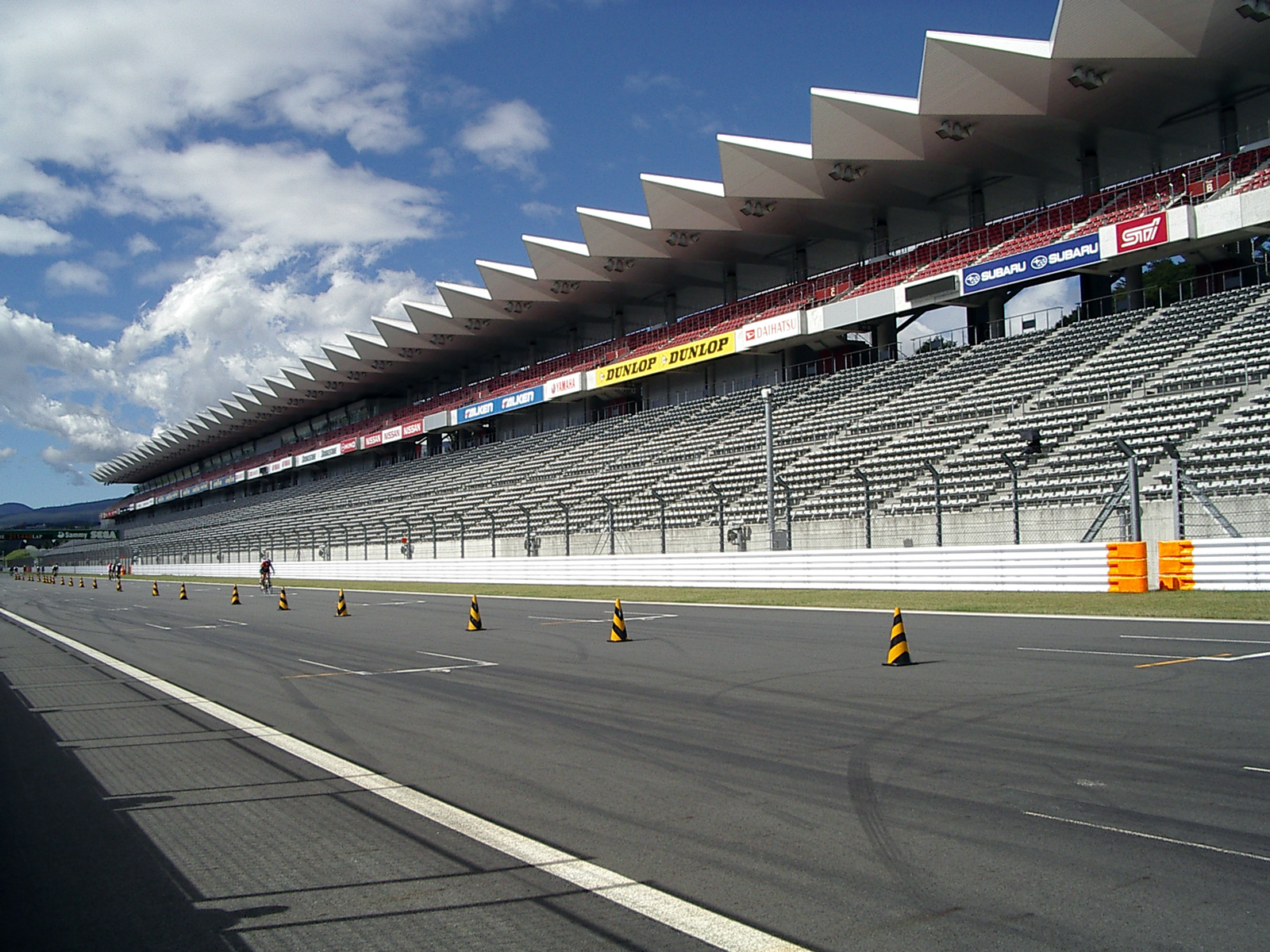
Fuji Speedway

Oyama (小山町, Oyama-chō) is a town located in Suntō District, Shizuoka Prefecture, Japan. As of 1 October 2023, the town had an estimated population of 17,297 in 7496 households and a population density of 127 persons per km^{2}. The total area of the town is 135.74 square kilometres (52.41 sq mi).

== Geography ==
Oyama is located in the far northeastern corner of Shizuoka Prefecture, bordering on Yamanashi and Kanagawa Prefectures. Located in between the Tanzawa Mountains and the foothills of Mount Fuji, the town has an average altitude of 800 meters, and has a cool climate with heavy rainfall. Some 65% of the town is covered in forest.

=== Surrounding municipalities ===
- Kanagawa Prefecture
  - Hakone
  - Minamiashigara
  - Yamakita
- Shizuoka Prefecture
  - Fujinomiya
  - Gotemba
- Yamanashi Prefecture
  - Fujiyoshida
  - Yamanakako

== Demographics ==
Per Japanese census data, the population of Oyama has been in decline over the past 50 years.

Historical population
Year	Pop.	±%
1940	9,170	—
1950	10,768	+17.4%
1960	25,944	+140.9%
1970	24,256	−6.5%
1980	23,212	−4.3%
1990	23,566	+1.5%
2000	22,235	−5.6%
2010	20,630	−7.2%
2020	18,568	−10.0%

=== Climate ===
The city has a climate characterized by hot and humid summers, and relatively mild winters (Köppen climate classification Cfa). The average annual temperature in Oyama is 12.7 °C. The average annual rainfall is 1817 mm with September as the wettest month. The temperatures are highest on average in August, at around 24.3 °C, and lowest in January, at around 1.7 °C.

== History ==
A small post town existed in this area since the Heian period, as Oyama is located at the base of the Ashigara Pass on the main route connecting the ancient provinces of Sagami with Kai and Suruga Provinces. The area was mostly tenryō territory under direct control of the Tokugawa shogunate in the Edo period. With the establishment of the modern municipalities system in the early Meiji period on April 1, 1889, the area was reorganized into the villages of Rokugo, Kannuma, Ashigara, Kitago and Subashiri within Suntō District, Shizuoka, two months after the opening of Suruga-Oyama Station on the Tōkaidō Main Line (now Gotemba Line).

The villages of Rokugo and Suganuma merged to form Oyama on August 1, 1912. Oyama annexed neighboring Ashigara on April 1, 1955, Kitago Village on August 1, 1956 and Subashiri on September 30, 1956. The Furusawa District of former Kitago transferred from Oyama to Gotemba on September 1, 1957.

== Economy ==
Due to its proximity to the Tokyo metropolitan area, Oyama has a mixed economy of agriculture and light industry. Rice is the principal agricultural crop.

== Education ==
Oyama has five public elementary schools and three public junior high school operated by the town government. The town has one public high school operated by the Shizuoka Prefectural Board of Education.

== Transportation ==
=== Railway ===
- Central Japan Railway Company - Gotemba Line
  - Suruga-Oyama - Ashigara

=== Highway ===
- Tōmei Expressway Gotemba Interchange
- National Route 138
- National Route 246

== Sister cities ==
- Shōō, Okayama, Japan since November 24, 1973
- Ōe, Kyoto, Japan since May 29, 1982
- Mission, British Columbia, Canada, since October 7, 1996

== Local attractions ==
- Fuji Cemetery
- Fuji Speedway
- Higashiguchi Hongū Fuji Sengen Jinja

== Notable people from Oyama ==
- Sachiko Sugiyama - professional volleyball player
