= Hakone Barrier =

National Historic Site of Japan

Hakone Seki 箱根関
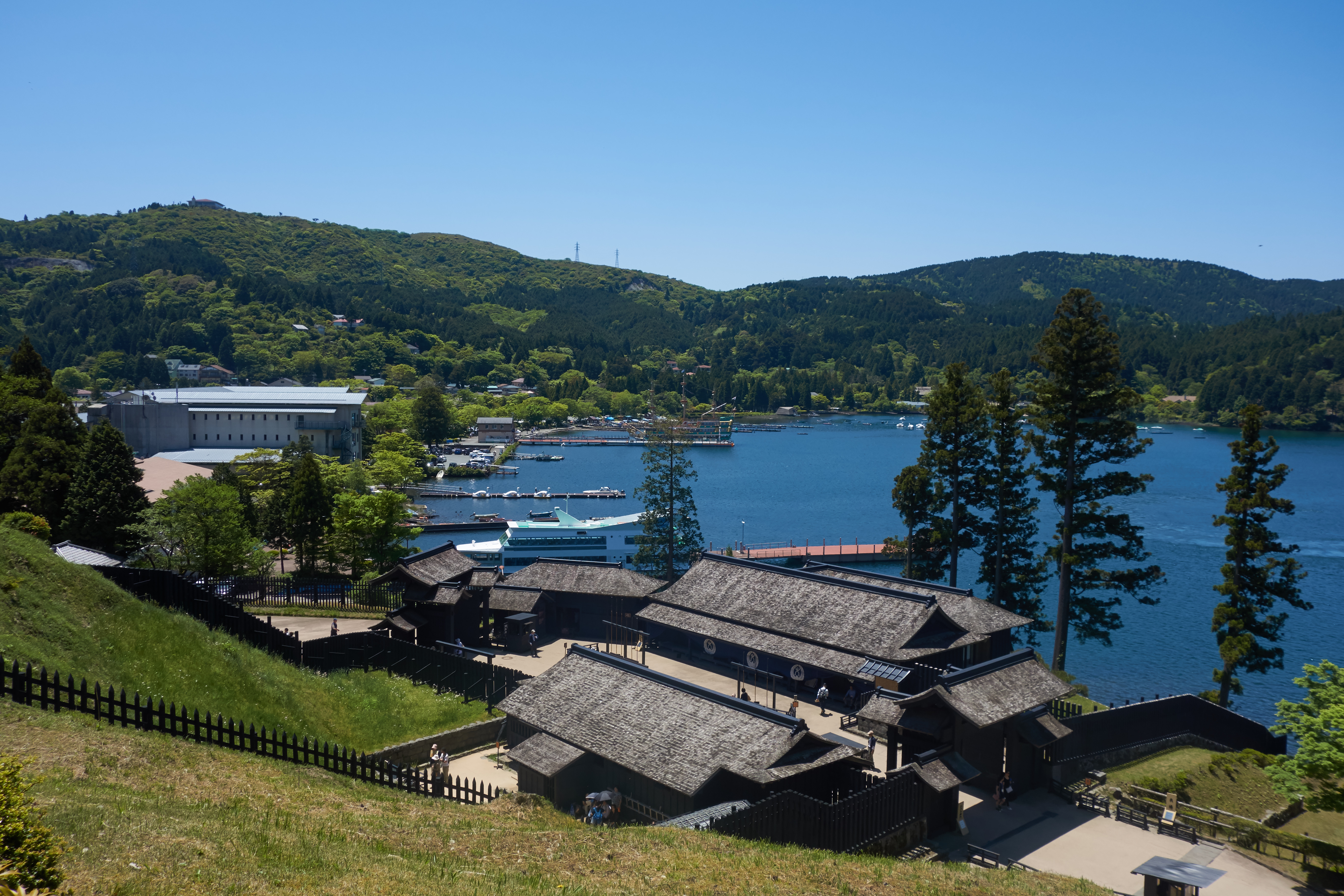
- View above Hakone Checkpoint Museum

- Location within Kanagawa Prefecture Location within Japan

General information
- Location: Hakone, Kanagawa, Japan
- Coordinates: 35°11′33″N 139°01′34″E

Website
- Official website

The Hakone Barrier (箱根関, Hakone Seki) was a security checkpoint which was established by the Tokugawa Shogunate on the Tōkaidō highway connecting the capital of Edo with Kyoto in Edo period Japan. In 1923, the site was recognized as a National Historic Site.

== Overview ==
The route of the ancient Tōkaidō highway connecting the Kansai region with the Kantō region of Japan passes through the Hakone Mountains, which forms a natural geographic chokepoint in the route. This was recognized from at least as early as the Nara period and there are indications that the Hakone Shrine was built in part to control the narrowest portion of this route. In the Heian period, Taira no Masakado dispatched troops to this location in anticipation of an invasion of government forces into the Kantō region during his revolt. Similarly, during the Jōkyū War of the Kamakura period Hōjō Yoshitoki ordered that a permanent garrison be based at the pass for similar reasons. During the Muromachi period, the jurisdiction over the pass came under the control of the Kamakura-fu and barriers were established mostly for purposes of taxation of travelers. Some of these barriers were temporary, as it is recorded that in 1380, a barrier was established for a three-year period to provide funding for the reconstruction of the temple of Engaku-ji in Kamakura. This practice continued into the Sengoku period, with control of the pass under the Late Hōjō clan.

After the establishment of the Tokugawa shogunate, the Hakone Pass was regarded as of key strategic importance in the outer defenses of Edo Castle. The shogunate built a new shukuba named Hakone-juku and relocated the site of the Hakone Barrier to the shore of Lake Ashi. For most of its existence, the barrier was operated for the shogunate by Odawara Domain. Physically, the barrier consisted of a pair of wooden gates on the highway, separated by a distance of 18 meters. The area in between the gates was flanked by buildings on both side, where travelers were required to submit their travel permits, goods were examined, and taxes were levied on commercial travelers with merchandise. However, the main purpose of the Hakone Barrier was security, especially the enforcement of the shogunate's regulations on transportation of weapons into Edo and the travel of women out of Edo. As the wives and families of the various daimyō were required to remain in Edo as hostages to the shogunate, this latter regulation was strictly enforced. Out of the staff of 20 people manning the barrier, several were women who performed a physical examination of female travelers to ensure that no woman of rank was attempting the leave the capital without permission.

The Hakone Barrier was abolished in 1869 by the new Meiji government along with all similar barriers around the country. The site of the Hakone Barrier was designated a National Historic Site in 1923, and a museum was opened in 1965. The site was excavated from 1999 to 2001, and a number of buildings were reconstructed based on the foundations discovered and mid-Edo period descriptions. The museum was remodeled in 2013.

== Gallery ==
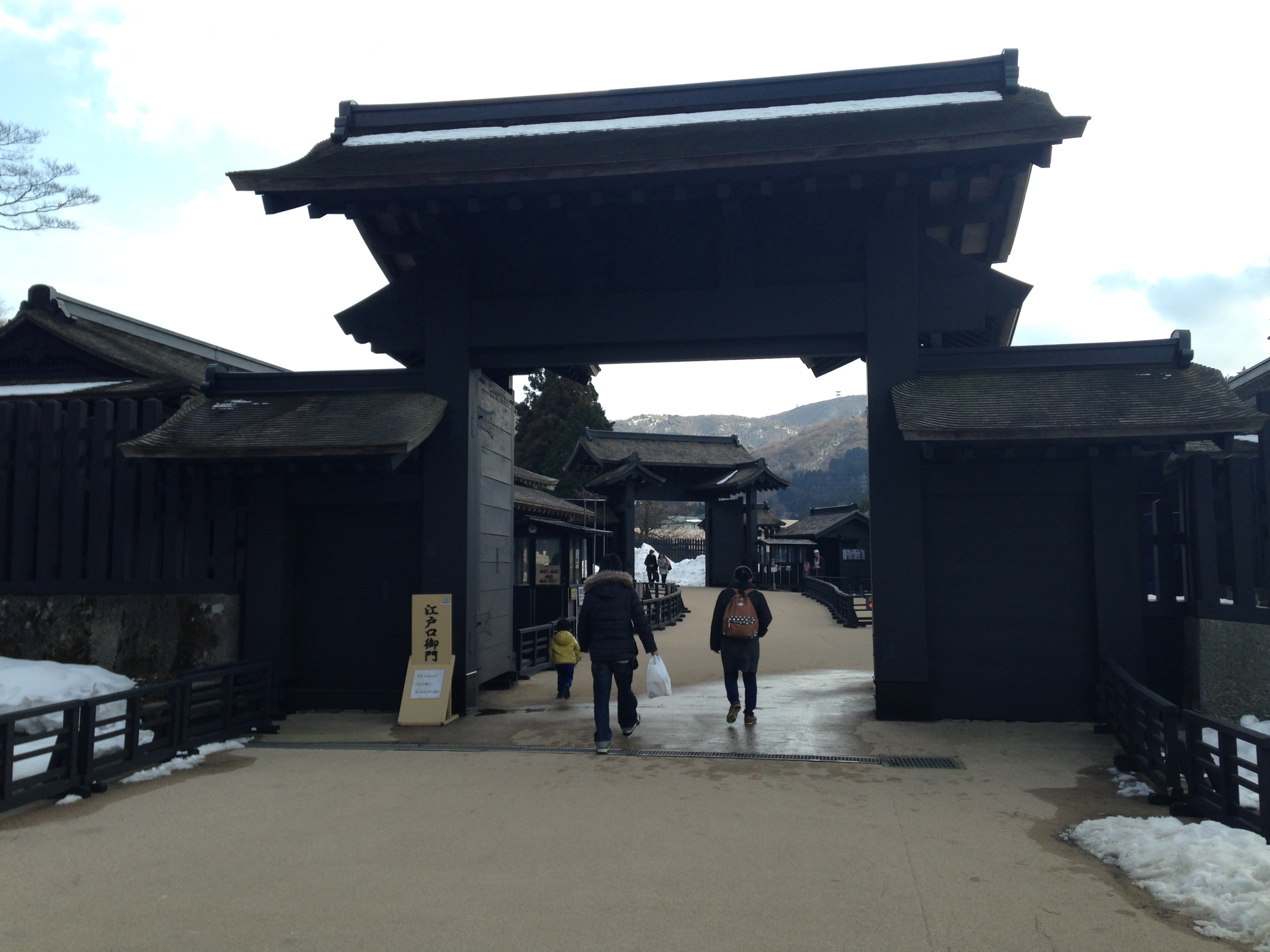
Edoguchi Gate

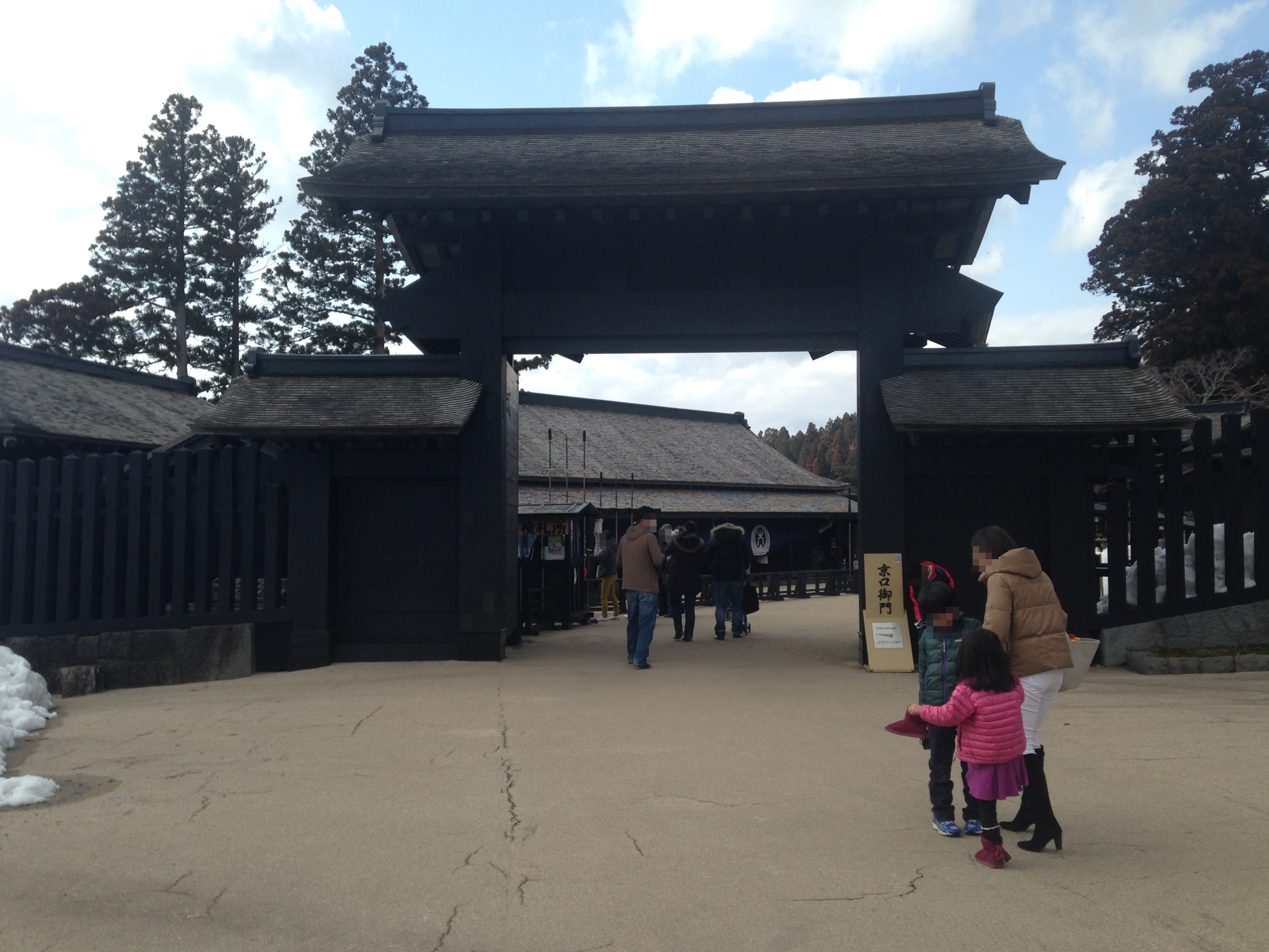
Kyoguchi Gate

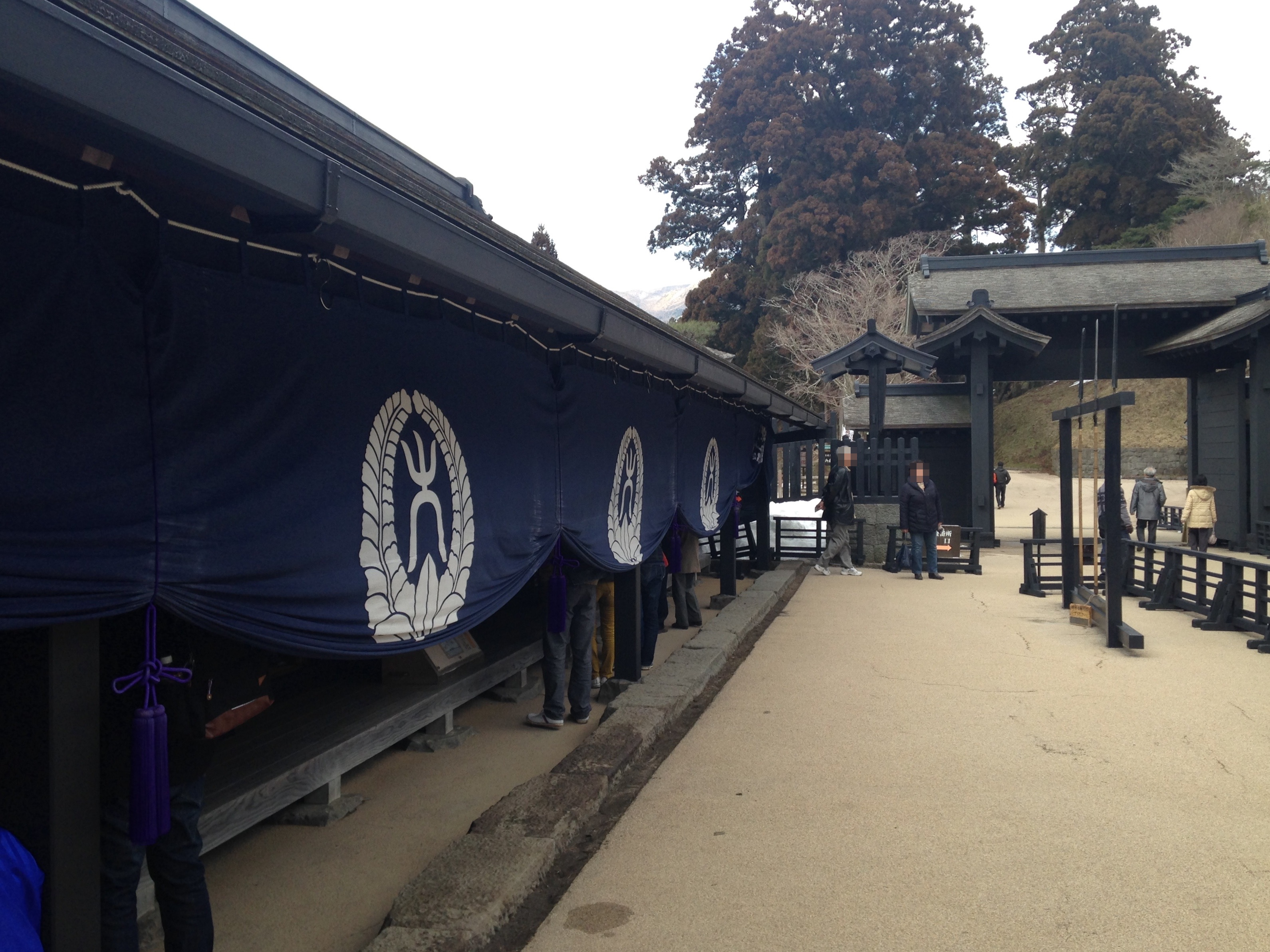
Obansho

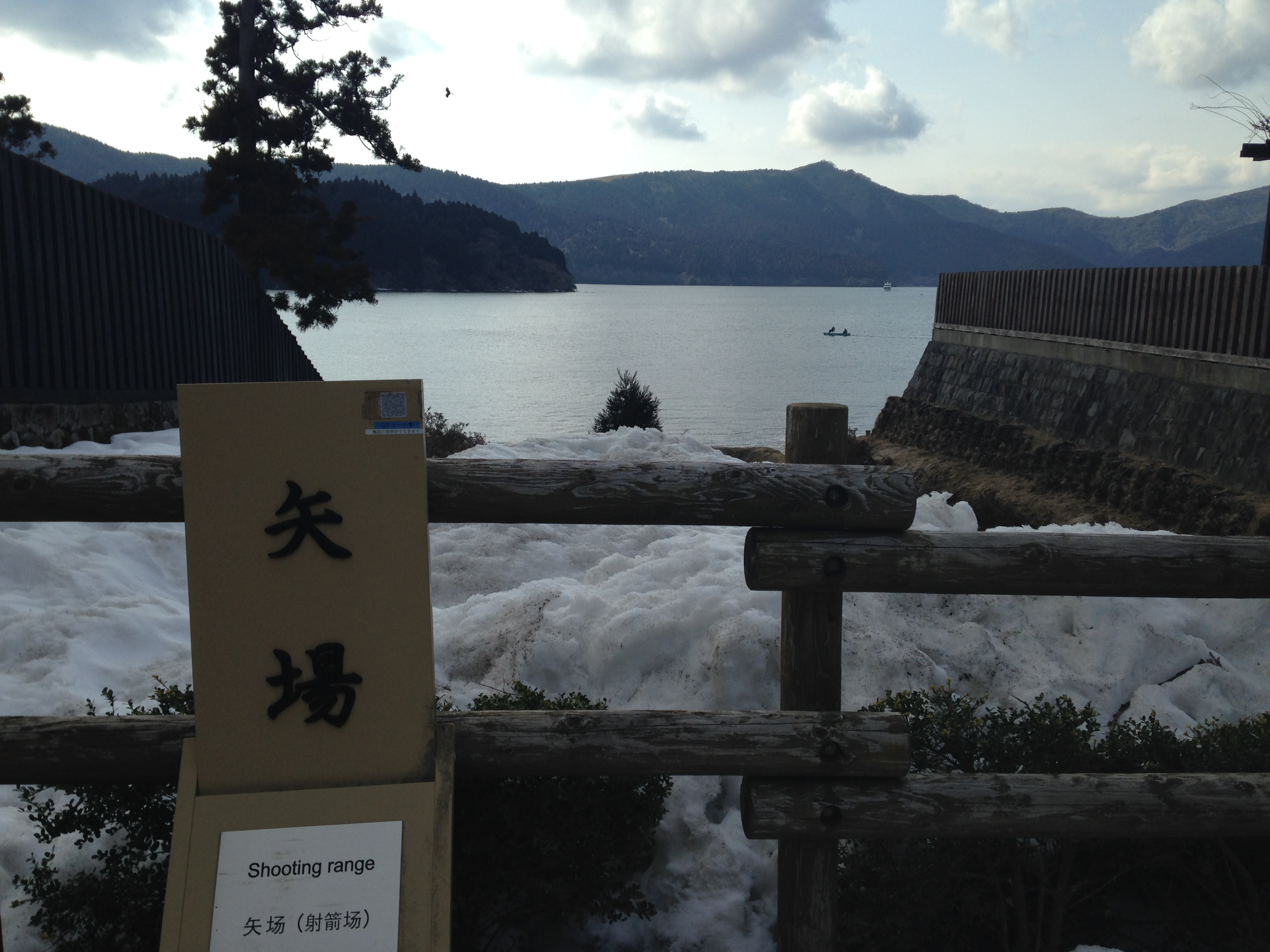
Archery range

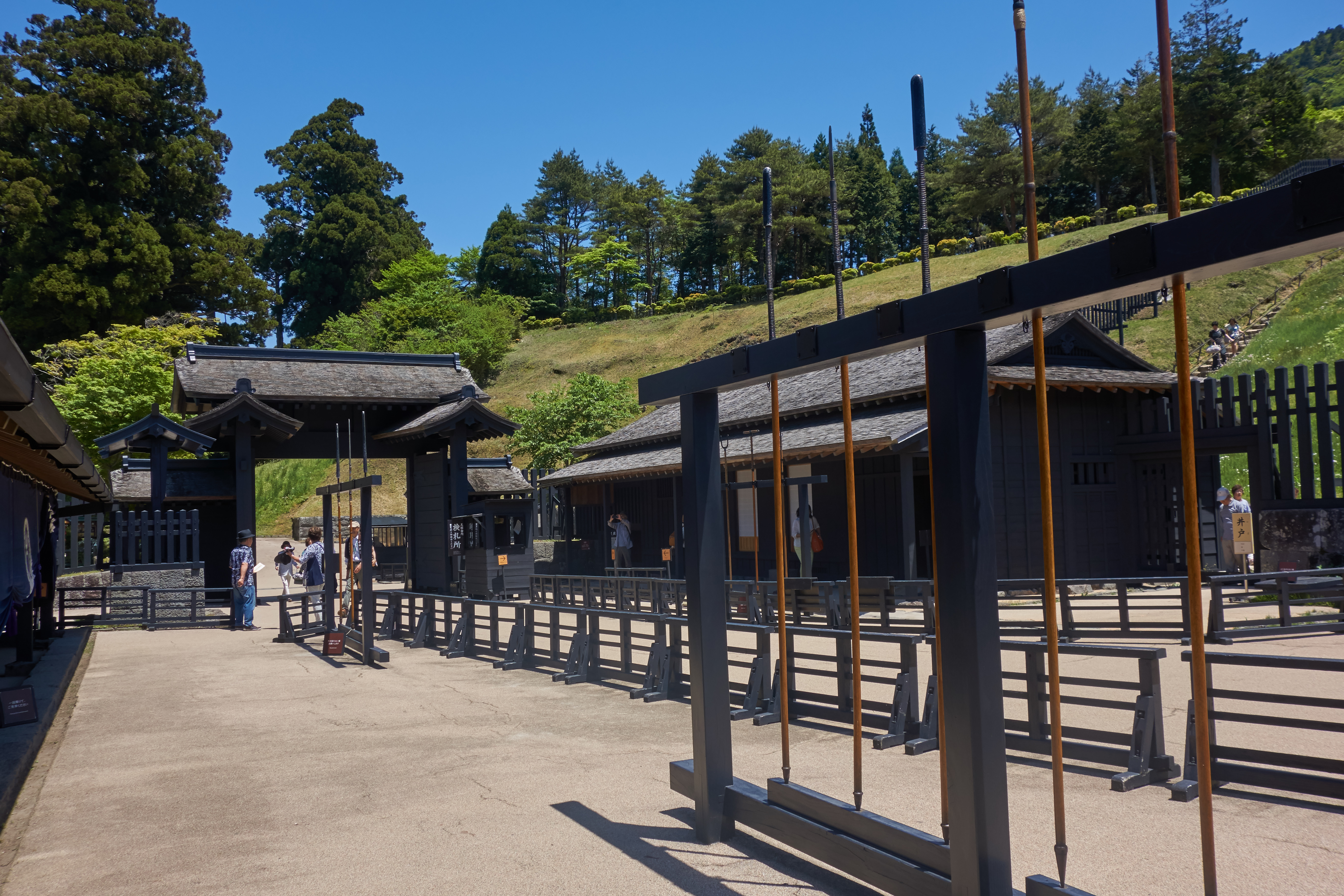
Museum

== See also ==
- List of Historic Sites of Japan (Kanagawa)
