= Ashigara Pass =

- 足柄峠
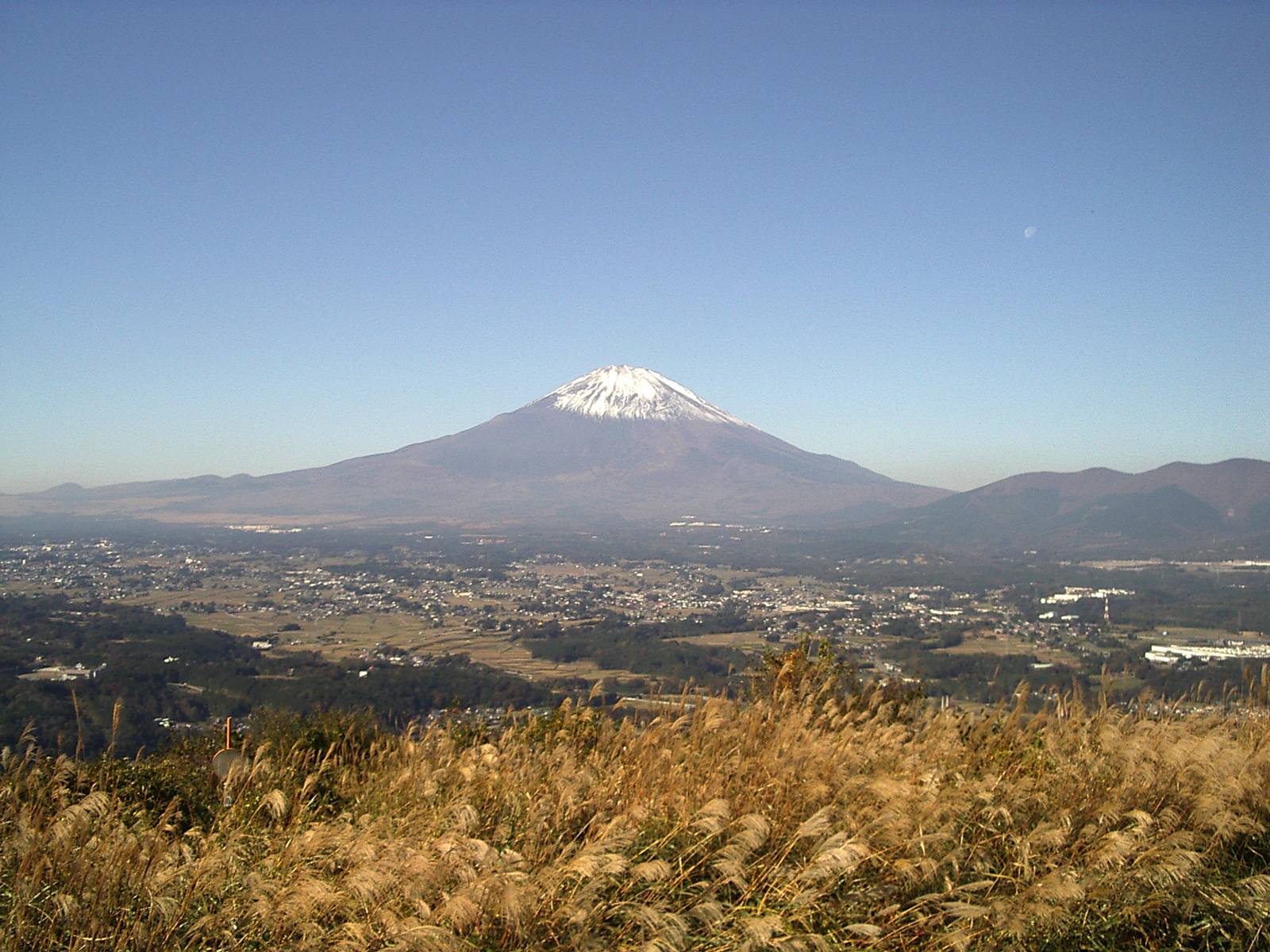
- Mount Fuji view from Ashigara Pass
- Interactive map of Ashigara Pass
- Elevation: 759 metres (2,490 ft)
- Traversed by: Kanagawa / Shizuoka Prefecturel Route 78

Third Approach
- Location: Minami-ashigara, Oyama, Japan
- Range: Mount Kintoki
- Coordinates: 35°19′10.8″N 139°0′43.7″E
- Topo map: Geographical Survey Institute; 25000:1 関本

Ashigara Pass (足柄峠, Ashigara-tōge) is a mountain pass on the border of Kanagawa and Shizuoka Prefectures, near Mount Kintoki in Japan. The pass traverses the mountains at 759 metres (2,490 ft).

== History ==
The pass, located on the ancient Tōkaidō highway, was first described in the 8th century anthology Man'yōshū. This pass served as the border between Sagami and Suruga provinces, as well as the main entrance to the Kantō region in Japan. A checkpoint was built in 899, and castle was built in the 16th century, both of which are no longer standing.

== Access ==
- by Car
  - Kanagawa Prefecturel Route 78, from Tomei Expressway Oi-Matsuda Interchange.
  - Shizuoka prefecturel Route 78, from Tomei Expressway Gotemba Interchange via Gotemba City Hall.
- by Train, Bus and walk
  - Hakone Tozan Bus from Shin-Matsuda Station on the Odakyu Line, or Daiyuzan Station on the Daiyuzan Line, to Jizodo, and an hour's walk. Direct operations are available from Daiyuzan Station or Jizodo to Ashigara Man'yo Koen (near this Pass) on Saturday & Holiday, in April and May, October and November.
  - 90 minute walk from Ashigara Station on the JR Gotemba Line.

== See also ==
- Mount Ashigara
- Kintoki
