= JS Ashigara =

Atago-class guided missile destroyer

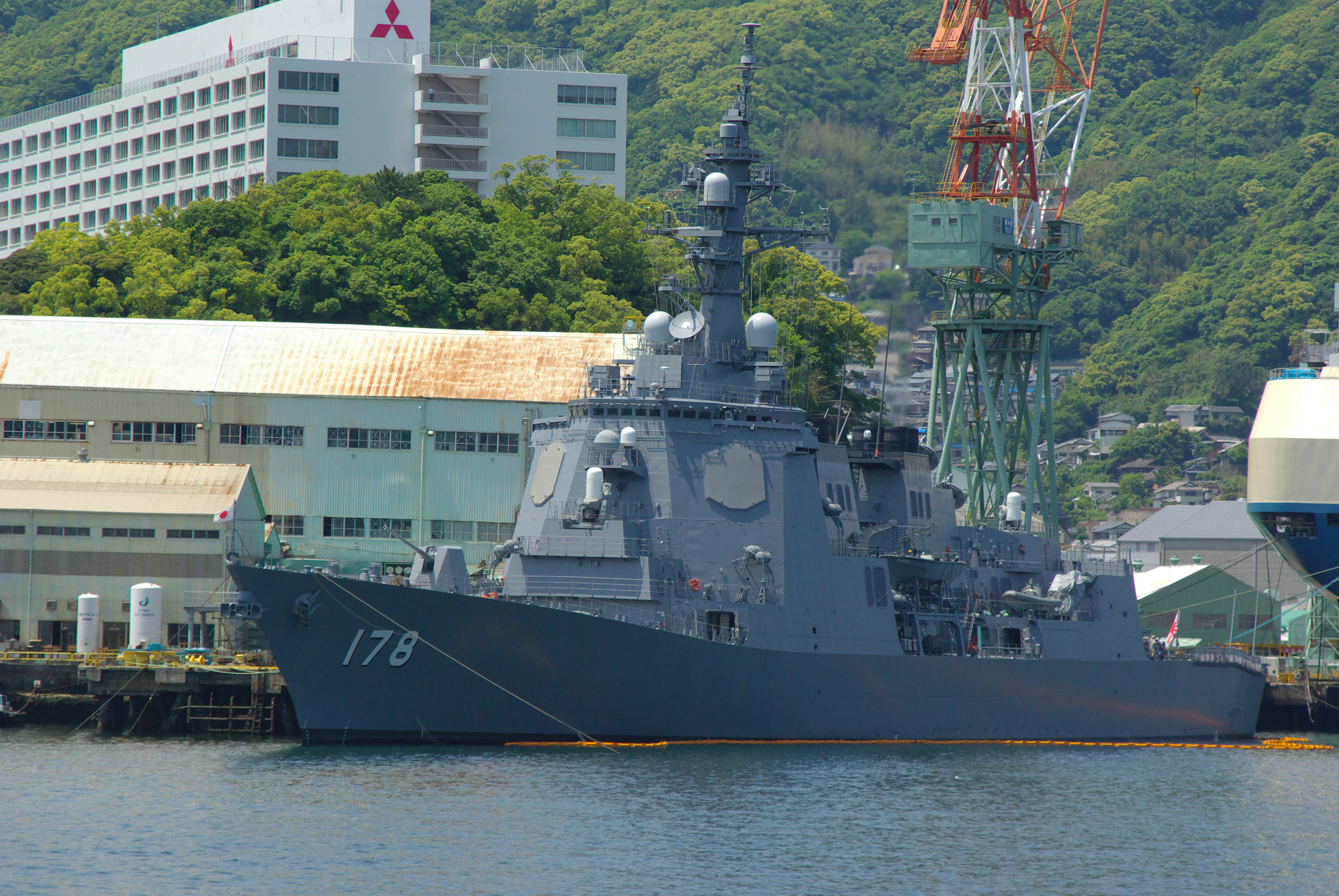
- JS Ashigara in May 2010

History

Japan
- Name: Ashigara; (あしがら)
- Namesake: Mount Ashigara
- Ordered: 2003
- Builder: Mitsubishi, Nagasaki
- Laid down: 6 April 2005
- Launched: 30 August 2006
- Commissioned: 13 March 2008
- Home port: Sasebo
- Identification: MMSI number: 431999689; Pennant number: DDG-178
- Status: Active

General characteristics
- Class & type: Atago-class destroyer
- Displacement: 7,700 tons standard; 10,000+ tons full load
- Length: 560 ft (170 m)
- Beam: 68.9 ft (21.0 m)
- Draft: 20.3 ft (6.2 m)
- Propulsion: 4 Ishikawajima Harima/General Electric LM2500-30 gas turbines; two shafts, 100,000 shp (75,000 kW)
- Speed: 30 knots (56 km/h; 35 mph)
- Range: 4,500 nmi (8,300 km; 5,200 mi) at 20 kn (37 km/h; 23 mph)
- Complement: 300
- Sensors & processing systems: AN/SPY-1D(V)
- Armament: 1 × 5 inch (127mm/L62) Mk-45 Mod 4 naval gun in a stealth-shaped mount. (Made by Japan Steel Works licensed from its original manufacturer).; 2 × missile canister up to 8 Type 90 (SSM-1B); 2 × 20 mm Phalanx CIWS; 2 × Type 68 triple torpedo tubes (6 × Mk 46 or Type 73 torpedoes); 96-cell Mk 41 VLS: (64 at the bow / 32 cells at the stern aft) for a mix of: SM-2MR Standard Missile; SM-3 Anti-Ballistic Missile; RUM-139 Vertical Launch ASROC (Anti-Submarine); RIM-162 Evolved Sea Sparrow
- Aircraft carried: 1 x SH-60K helicopter

JS Ashigara (DDG-178) is an Atago-class guided missile destroyer in the Japan Maritime Self-Defense Force (JMSDF). Ashigara was named for Mount Ashigara, and is the first Japanese ship to bear the prefix JS (Japanese Ship) instead of JDS (Japanese Defense Ship).

She was laid down by Mitsubishi Heavy Industries in Nagasaki, Nagasaki on April 6, 2005, launched on August 30, 2006; and was commissioned on 13 March 2008.

== Service ==
This ship was one of several in the JMSDF fleet participating in disaster relief after the 2011 Tōhoku earthquake and tsunami.

In late April 2017, the Ashigara along with the JS Samidare joined the US Navy's Carrier Strike Group 1 as the Strike Group moved into position off the Korean peninsula in response to escalating tensions between North Korea and the United States over the DPRK's nuclear weapons program.

Ashigara and the JS Ise participated in the RIMPAC exercises in the waters around Hawaii on August 17-30, 2020.

== Gallery ==
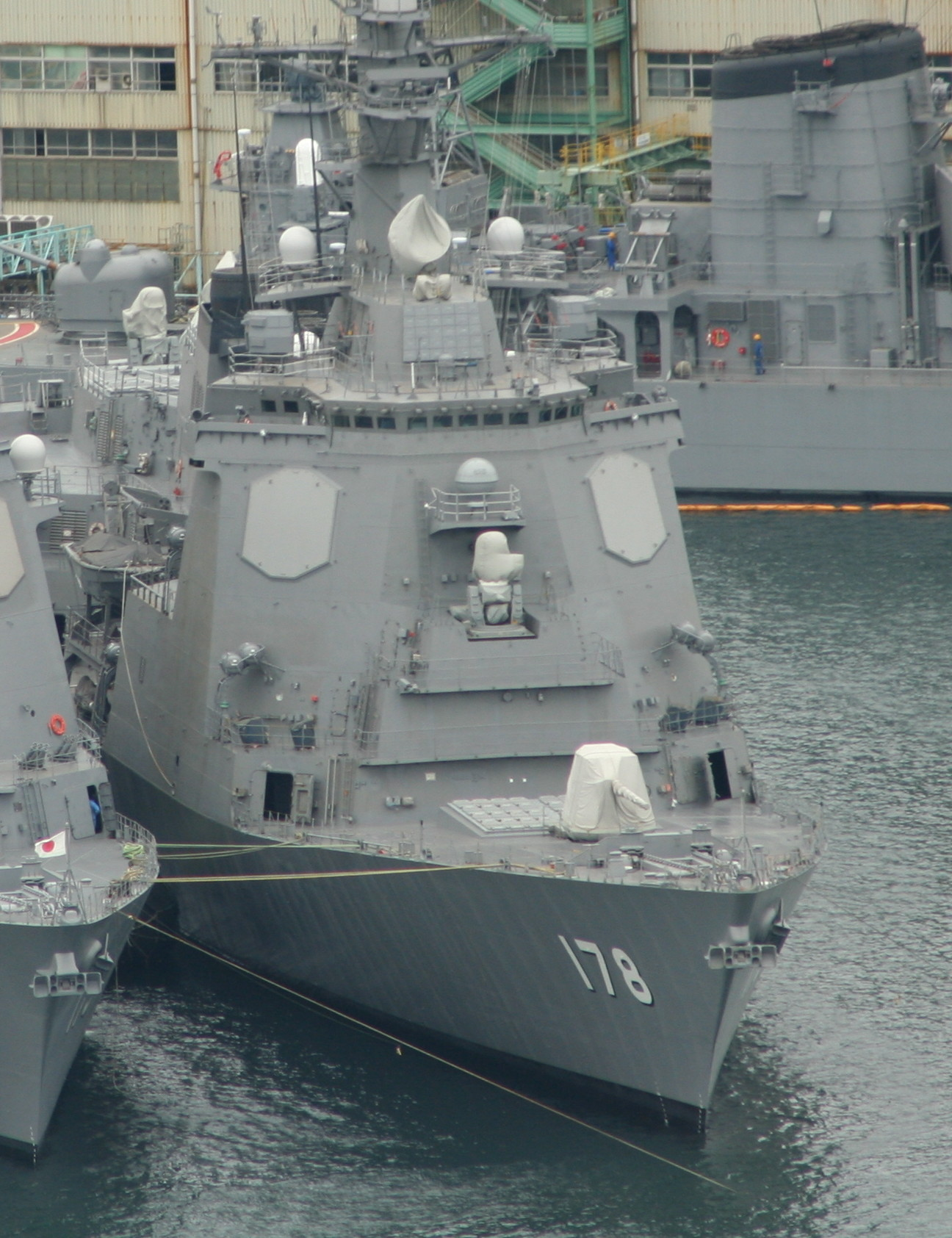
JS Ashigara on 3 June 2007

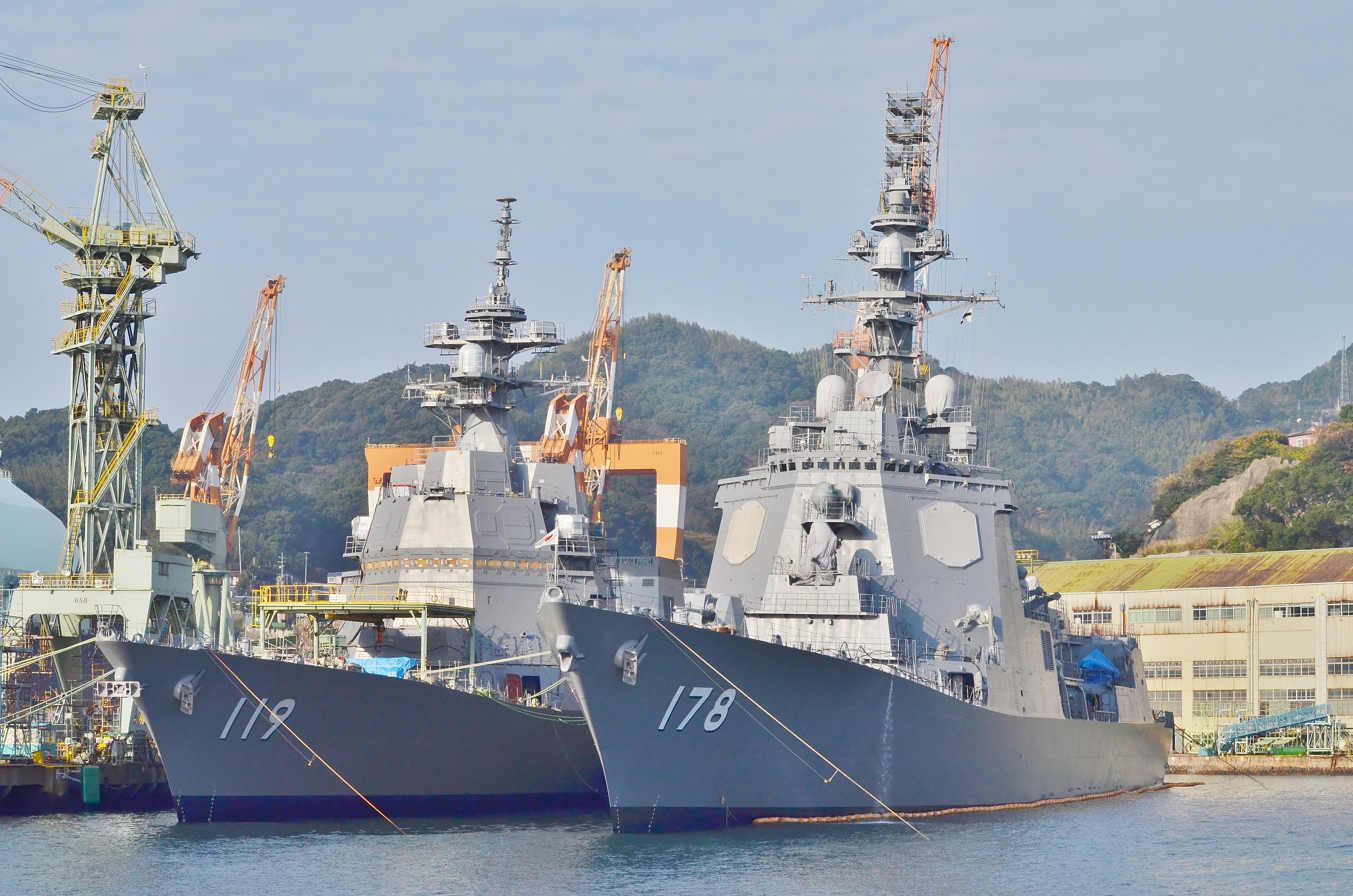
JS Ashigara and JS Asahi on 2 January 2017

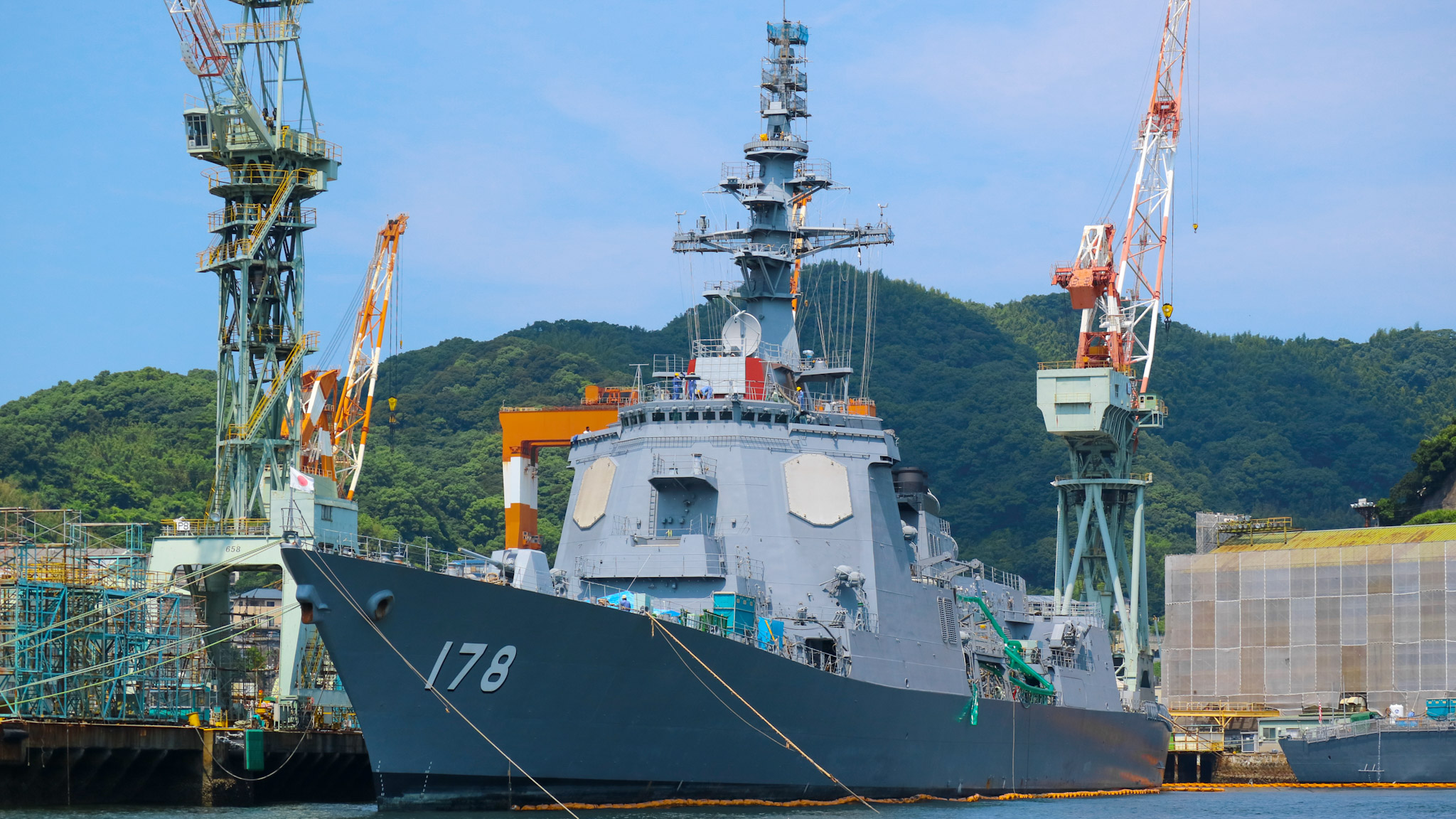
JS Ashigara on 21 July 2017

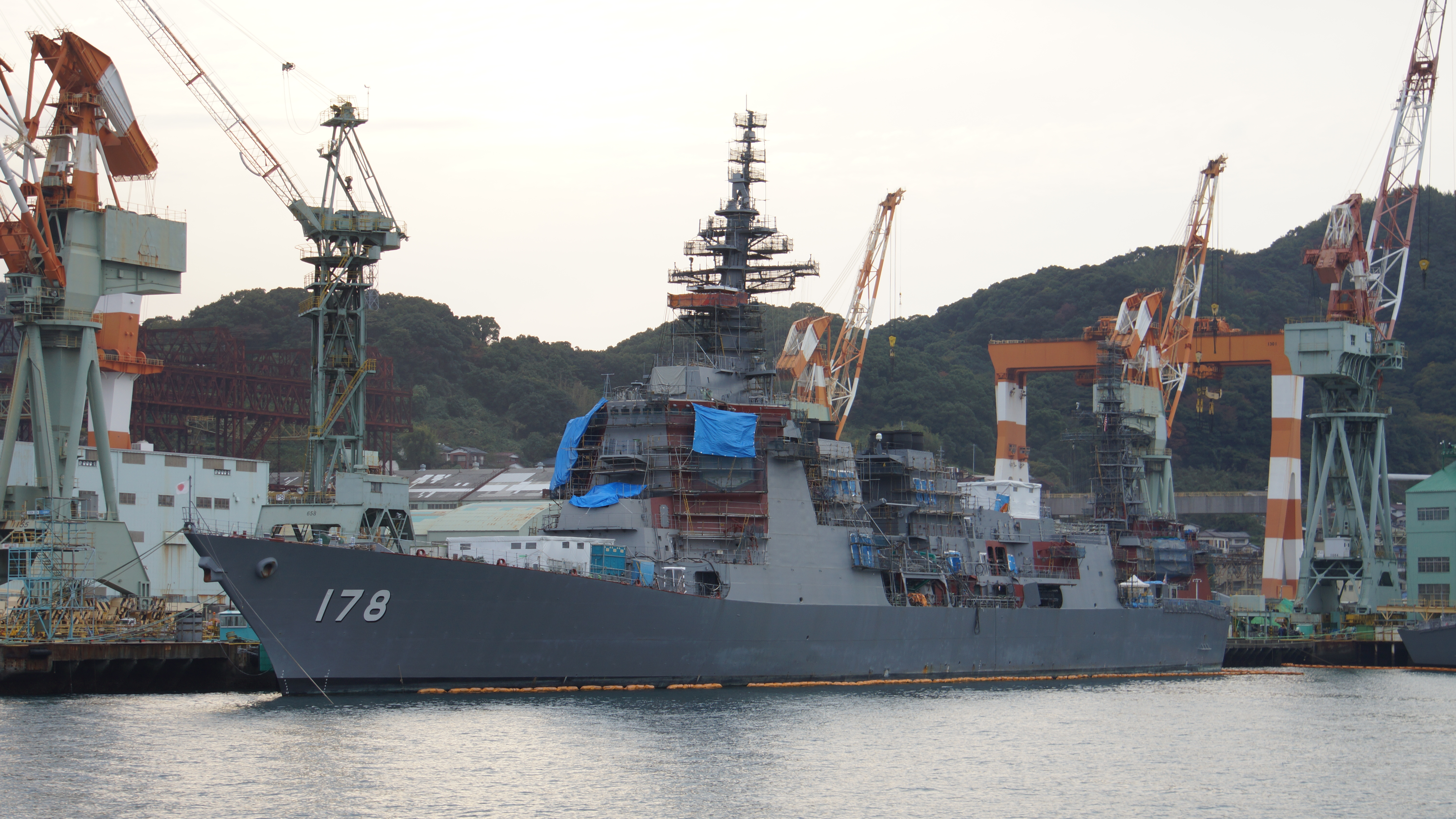
JS Ashigara on 25 November 2017

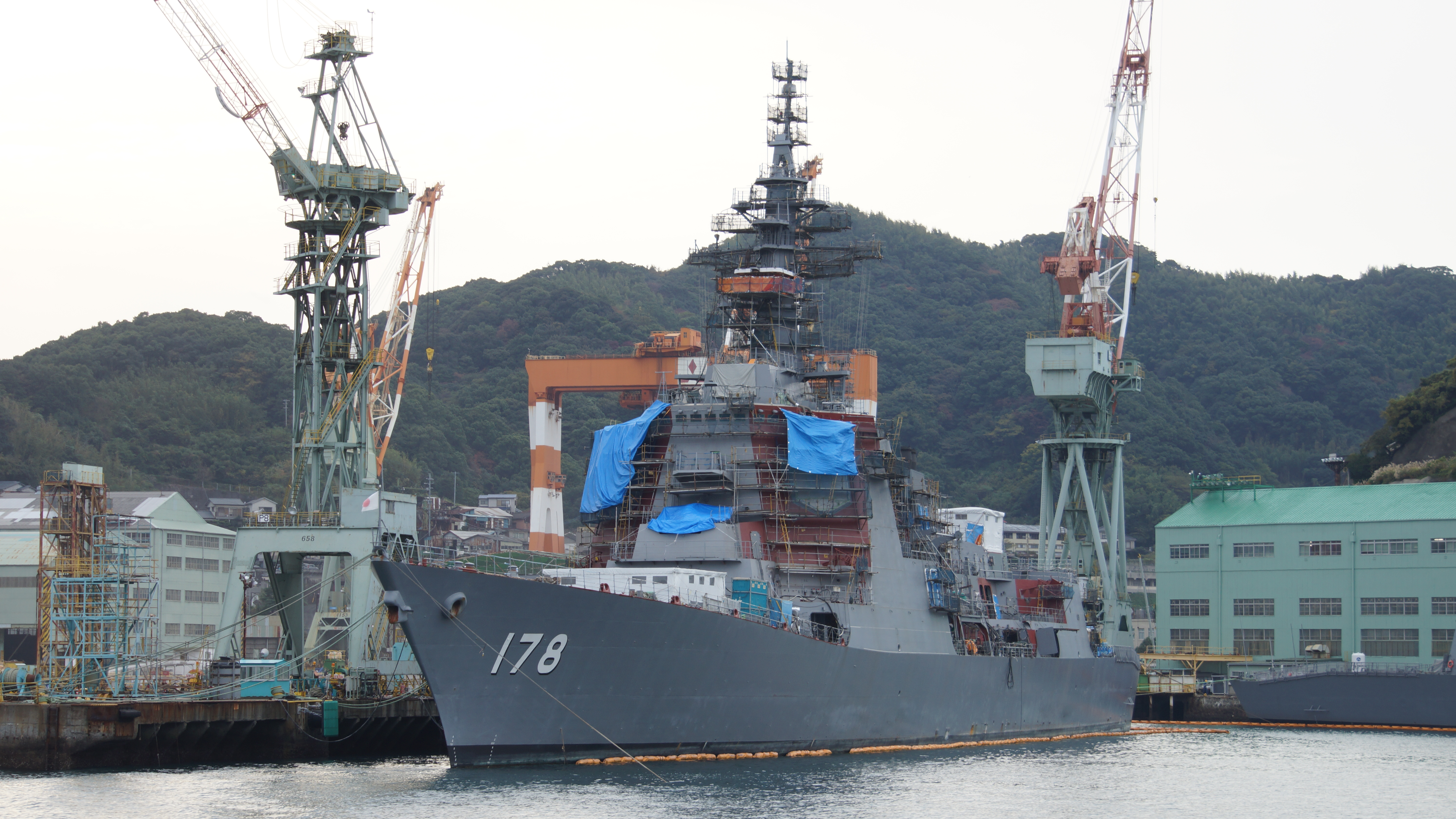

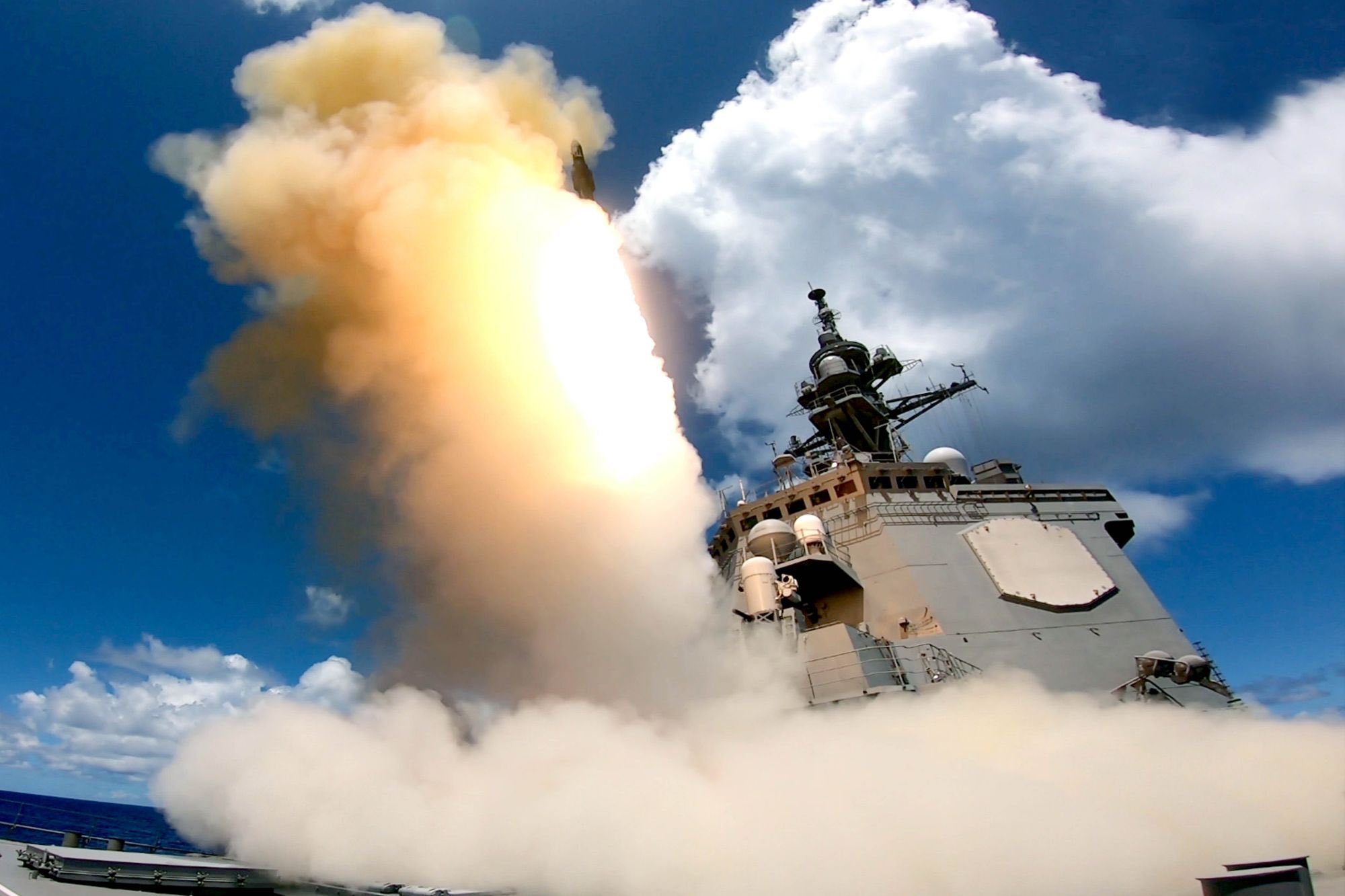
JS Ashigara on 18 August 2020
