= Ōshū Corporation =

- Naka-machi 1-1 Naka-ku; Hiroshima 〒730-0037

Information
- Established: June 1986
- Faculty: 552

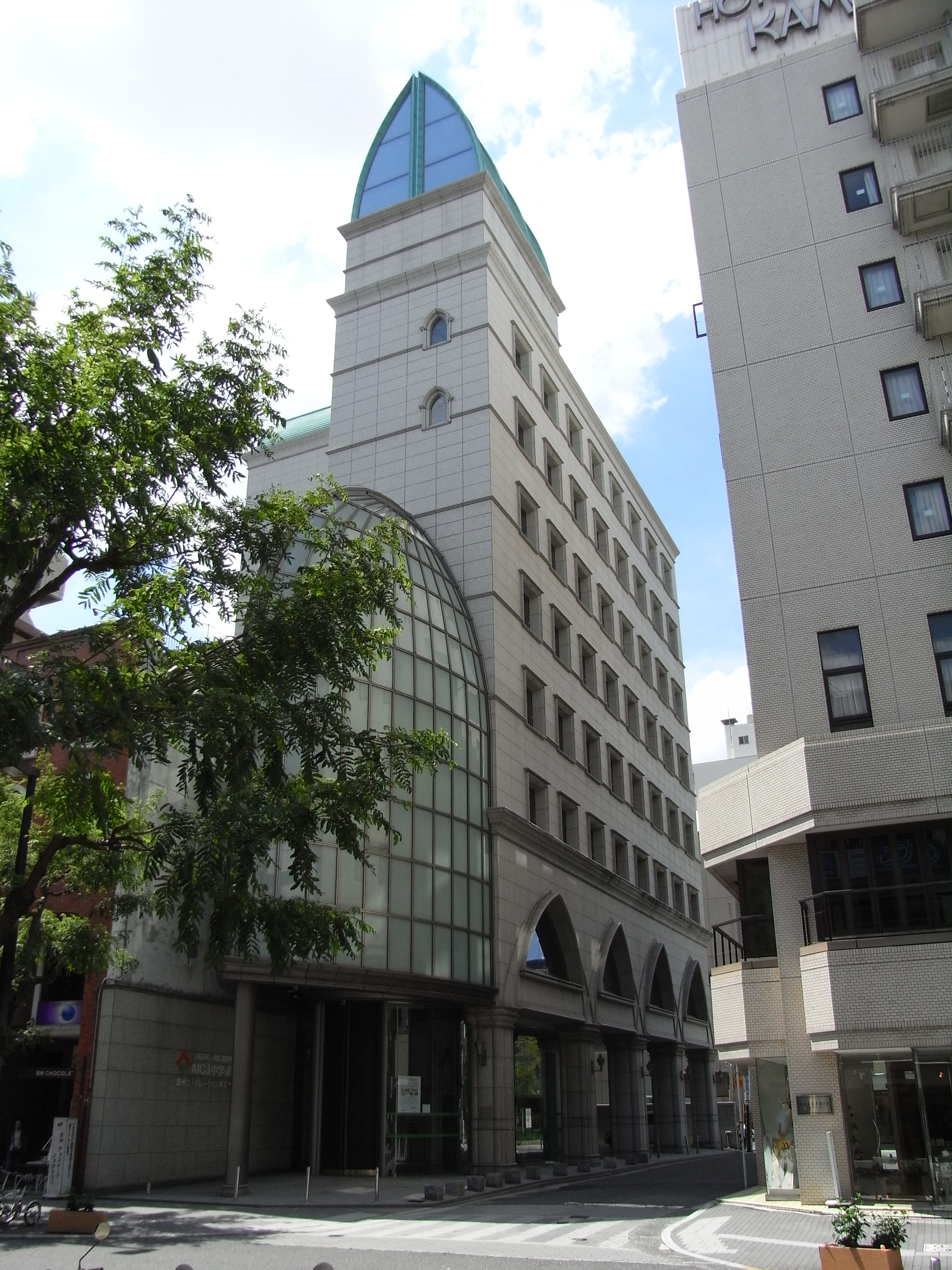
head office

Oshu Corporation (鴎州コーポレーション) is a for-profit company that manages cram schools based in Hiroshima Prefecture. Oshu Corporation is headquartered in Namikidōri, Naka-ku, Hiroshima.

Auckland International College (AIC), owned by Oshu Corporation, was established in 2003 in Auckland, New Zealand. The corporation permanently closed AIC due to difficulty attracting international students.
