= Ashigara Station (Shizuoka) =

Railway station in Oyama, Shizuoka Prefecture, Japan

CB09 Ashigara Station 足柄駅
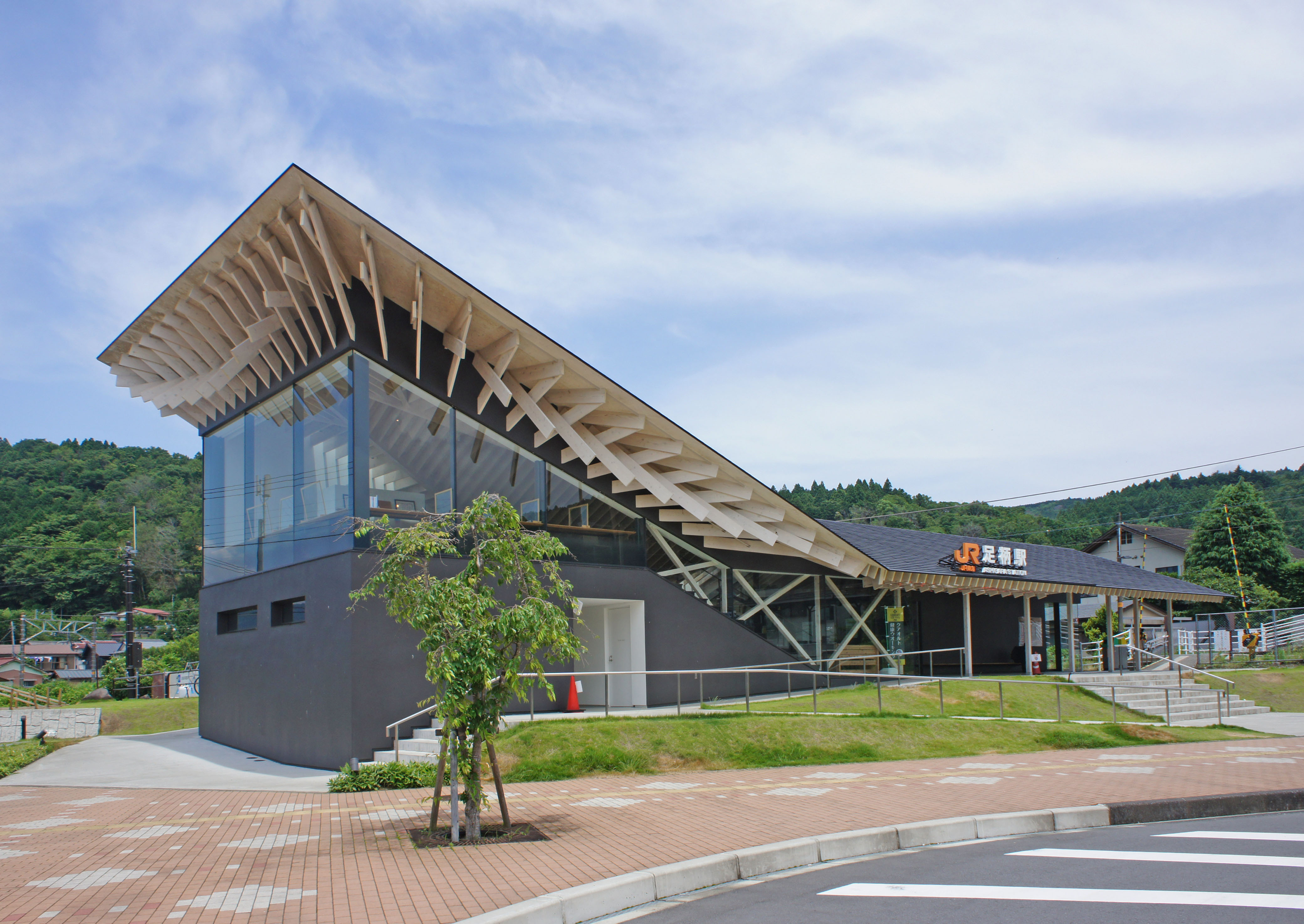
- Exterior of Ashigara Station in June 2022

General information
- Location: Takenoshita, Oyama Town, Suntō District, Shizuoka Prefecture; Japan
- Coordinates: 35°20′00″N 138°58′53″E
- Operator: JR Central
- Line: Gotemba Line
- Distance: 28.9 km (18.0 mi) from Kōzu
- Platforms: 1 island platform
- Tracks: 2

Construction
- Structure type: At grade

Other information
- Status: Unstaffed
- Station code: CB09

History
- Opened: 15 September 1947; 79 years ago

Passengers
- FY2017: 497 daily

Services
Preceding station	JR Central	Following station
Gotemba CB10 towards Numazu	Gotemba Line	Suruga-Oyama CB08 towards Kōzu
Location
- Location within Shizuoka Prefecture Location within Central Japan Location within Japan

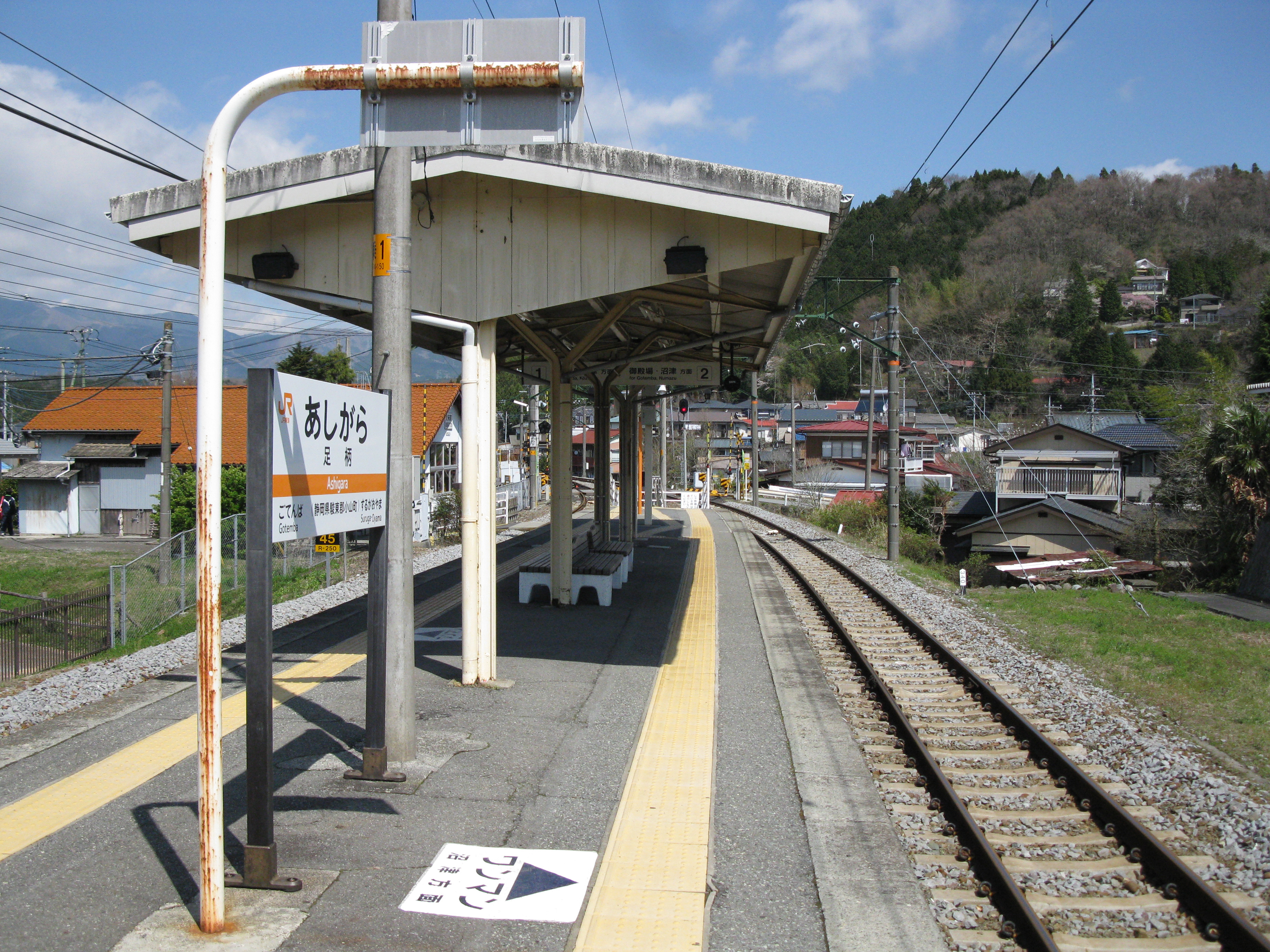
Platform

Ashigara Station (足柄駅, Ashgara-eki) is a railway station in the town of Oyama, Shizuoka Prefecture, Japan, operated by the Central Japan Railway Company (JR Central).

== Lines ==
Ashigara Station is served by the JR Central Gotemba Line, and is located 28.9 kilometers from the official starting point of the line at Kōzu.

== Station layout ==
The station has a single island platform. The station building is to the west of the tracks and connected to the platform by a level crossing. It has automated ticket machines, TOICA automated turnstiles. The station is unattended.

=== Platforms ===
1	Gotemba Line	for Matsuda and Kōzu
2	Gotemba Line	for Gotemba and Numazu

== History ==
Ashigara Station opened on September 15, 1947. Operational control of the station was transferred to JR Central following privatization of JNR on April 1, 1987.

Station numbering was introduced to the Gotemba Line in March 2018; Ashigara Station was assigned station number CB09.

== Passenger statistics ==
In fiscal 2017, the station was used by an average of 497 passengers daily (boarding passengers only).

== Surrounding area ==
- Ashigara Elementary School
- Oyama High School

== See also ==
- List of railway stations in Japan
