= 2020 Summer Paralympics torch relay =

XVI Paralympic Games
- Host city: Tokyo, Japan
- Countries visited: Great Britain, Japan
- Theme: Share Your Light
- Start date: 12 August 2021
- End date: 24 August 2021

The 2020 Summer Paralympics torch relay was held from 12 August 2021 to 24 August 2021. After being lit in multiple locations in Japan and Great Britain, the torch was intended to travel around Japan and end in Tokyo's New National Stadium, the main venue of the 2020 Summer Paralympics. The relay took place on a smaller scale than the Olympic relay, starting in Tokyo, with local flames lighted through Saitama, Chiba and Shizuoka prefectures where events of the games were held. The relay ended at the 2020 Summer Paralympics opening ceremony. The LIXIL Corporation was the presenting partner of the torch relay.

== Relay ==
The relay started with Flame festivals planned in 43 of prefectures of Japan, as well as additional locations hosting the Paralympics. On 20 August, the flames from each location will be brought together as one, along with an additional flame from Stoke Mandeville, Great Britain, the birthplace of the Paralympic movement, to become a single Paralympic Flame at a ceremony in Tokyo. From 21 to 25 August, the one flame will follow a single route, culminating at the New National Stadium for the opening ceremonies.

== Route in Japan ==
| Prefecture | Route | Map |
|---|---|---|
| Hokkaido | 12 August 2021 (day 1): Fukagawa to Mukawa: Fukagawa (Fukagawa City Athletics Field); Sapporo (Sapporo City Hall); Kitahiroshima (Kitahiroshima City Hall); Tomakomai (Tomakomai City Hall); Asahikawa (Kawamura Kaneto Aynu Memorial Hall and Hanasaki Sports Park Athletic Field); Nayoro (Nayoro Observatory); Kitami (Kitami Citizens Skating Rink); Abashiri (Abashiri Sports and Recreation Center); Tobetsu (Tobetsu Gymnasium); Esashi (Asunaro Social Welfare Service Corporation); Mukawa (Hobetsu Museum); 13 August 2021 (day 2): Eniwa: Eniwa (Eniwa City Child's Development Support Center); 14 August 2021 (day 3): Ebetsu to Atsuma: Ebetsu (Ebetsu City Gymnasium); Ishikari (Ishikari City Hall); Kushiro (Lake Akan Ainu Theater); Shinshinotsu; Kyōgoku (Kyogoku Gymnasium); Atsuma (Atsuma Town Karumai Archaeological Site Survey and Arrangement Office); 15 August 2021 (day 4): Abira: Abira (Hayakita Elementary School); 16 August 2021 (day 5): Shiraoi to Sapporo: Shiraoi (Shiraoi Ainu Memorial Park); Sapporo (Former Hokkaidō Government Office); Unknown date in August 2021 (day unknown): Route unknown: Iwamizawa (East Station Plaza); Noboribetsu | 2020 Summer Paralympics torch relay is located in Hokkaido |
| Aomori | 15 August 2021 (day 4): Hirosaki to Aomori: Hirosaki (Omori Katsuyama Stone Circle); Hachinohe (Korekawa Archaeological Institution); Towada (Towada City Hall); Misawa (Minamiyama Outdoor Sports Facility); Hiranai; (Yogoshiyama Forest Park)Nakadomari (Miyakoshi Garden); Noheji (Shibasaki Health and Recreation Facility); Aomori (Sannai Maruyama Site); 16 August 2021 (day 5): Misawa: Misawa (Minamiyama Outdoor Sports Facility) | 2020 Summer Paralympics torch relay is located in Aomori Prefecture |
| Iwate | 12 August 2021 (day 1): Hanamaki to Ichinohe: Hanamaki (Hanamaki General Gymnasium); Tōno (Hayase River); Ōshū (Esashi-Fujiwara Heritage Park and Outdoor Stage Bugakuden); Nishiwaga (Juntakukai Workstation Yuda, Sawauchi); Rikuzentakata (Kesen Carpentry & Folklore Museum); Ōtsuchi (Shiroyama Park); Iwaizumi (Ryusendo); Fudai (Fudai Station); Karumai (Karumai Town Welfare Center for the Elderly); Noda (Noda Village Hall); Kunohe (HOZ Hall at Kunohe Village Community Center); Ichinohe (Goshono Jomon Park); 13 August 2021 (day 2): Yahaba to Hirono: Yahaba (Yahaba Museum of History and Folklore); Ichinoseki (Surisawa Shopping District); Hirono (Agri Park Osawa); 14 August 2021 (day 3): Iwate to Sumita: Iwate (Roadside Station Ishigaminooka); Sumita (Sumita Town Hall); 15 August 2021 (day 4): Morioka to Ninohe: Morioka (Arcade, Morioka Odori Shopping Street); Hachimantai (Hachimantai Matsuo General Sports Park); Shiwa (Ogal Square East); Hiraizumi (Hiraizumi Elementary School); Miyako (Kuwagasaki Community Center, Tsugaruishi Community Center, Omoe Elementary School and Taro Daiichi Junior High School); Ōfunato (Suzaki River Waterfront Plaza); Kamaishi (Kamaishi Station Square); Kuji (Kuji Civic Gymnasium); Ninohe (Ninohe City Civic Center); 16 August 2021 (day 5): Takizawa to Morioka: Takizawa (Big Roof Takizawa); Shizukuishi (Alpen World Ski Championships Memorial Park); Kuzumaki (Kuzumaki Town Hall); Kitakami (Kitakami Shopping Center); Kanegasaki (Kanegasaki Central Lifelong Learning Center); Yamada (Ogurayama); Tanohata (Azby Hall); Morioka (Morioka Shopping Mall) | 2020 Summer Paralympics torch relay is located in Iwate Prefecture |
| Miyagi | 12 August 2021 (day 1): Kesennuma: Kesennuma (Kesennuma City Welfare Center Yasuragi); 14 August 2021 (day 3): Kakuda to Kami: Kakuda (Daiyama Park); Kami (Nakaniida Cultural Center); 15 August 2021 (day 4): Sendai to Hachimantai: Sendai (Sendsi Social Welfare Service Corporation and Sensyunomori Restaurant Peer-terrace); Ishinomaki (Ishinomaki City General Sports Park); Higashimatsushima (Okumatsushima Jomon Village Museum); Ōsaki (Kashimadai Central Baseball Ground, Kashimadai Mizuhanamidori Entertainment Plaza); Watari (Miyagi Prefecture Fishery Cooperative, Sennan Branch, Watari Fish Market); 16 August 2021 (day 5): Iwanuma to Sendai: Iwanuma (Iwanuma Fire Station); Sendai (Kotodai Park Open-Air Concert Hall) | 2020 Summer Paralympics torch relay is located in Miyagi Prefecture |
| Akita | 12 August 2021 (day 1): Kazuno to Higashinaruse: Kazuno (Oyu Stone Circles Center); Kitaakita (Isedotai Jomon Museum); Nikaho (Kisakata Beach); Kosaka (Korakukan); Fujisato (Shirakamisanchi World Heritage Conservation Center); Happō (Houeikan Happo Public Hall); Higashinaruse (Higashinaruse Nature Museum); 14 August 2021 (day 3): Odate to Ikawa: Odate (Odate Cultural Hall); Ikawa (Kirigaoka Disability Support Facility); 15 August 2021 (day 4): Akita to Ōgata: Akita (Neburi Nagashi Kan, Akita City Folk Performing Arts Heritage Center); Noshiro (Science Park Noshiro City Children's Center); Semboku (Unganji Temple); Gojōme (Gojōme Pubrlic Center); Hachirōgata (Hachirōgata Town Public Hall); Ōgata (Akita Prefecture Agricultural Training Center); 16 August 2021 (day 5): Yokote to Akita: Yokote (Yokote Budokan); Oga (Shinzan Shrine); Yuzawa (Yuzawa Geothermal Power Plant); Yurihonjō (Chokai Sports Square); Katagami (Disability Support Facility Cafe Tukushinbo); Daisen; (Hottnosakua National Historic Site)Kamikoani (Bussha Area Natural Park); Mitane (Ishikurayama Camp Site); Misato (House of Sakamoto Togaku); Ugo (Bonfire Square); Akita (Akita Shopping Center | 2020 Summer Paralympics torch relay is located in Akita Prefecture |
| Yamagata | 12 August 2021 (day 1): Yamagata to Yuza: Yamagata (Yamadera Konpon Chudo Hall and Zao Daigongen Hall); Sagae (Jionji Temple); Murayama (Atago-bori moat, Okubo); Yuza (Yuza Town Hall); 13 August 2021 (day 2): Sakata to Asahi: Sakata (Hiyoriyama Park); Tendō (Tendō Nishinumata Site Park); Asahi (Kukijinja Shrine); 14 August 2021 (day 3): Tsuruoka to Mamurogawa: Tsuruoka (Tsuruoka Komagihara Athletic Field); Higashine (Higashine Municipal Gymnasium); Kahoku (Iwaki Rural Park); Nishikawa (Hondouji Kuchinomiya Yudonosan Shrine); Kaneyama (Kaneyama Town Nousonkankyoukaizen Center); Mamurogawa (Mamurogawa Town Event House Yurakukan); 15 August 2021 (day 4): Shinjō to Akita: Shinjō (Shinjo City Hall); Nagai (Kawanominato Nagai); Obanazawa (Obanazawa Pottery Facility); Yamanobe (Yamanobe Town Central Public Hall); Nakayama (Nakayama Town Central Public Hall); Ōe (Mogami Riverside); Ōishida (Niji-no-Plaza, Ōishida Community Center); Tozawa (Tozawa Central Public Hall); Takahata (Takahata Town Chamber of Commerce); Shirataka (Shirataka Central Public Hall); Iide (Iide Town General Center "Earth"); Mikawa (Nanohana Hall); 16 August 2021 (day 5): Yonezawa to Tendō: Yonezawa (Yonezawa Municipal Gymnasium); Kaminoyama (Kaminoyama Hotel); Nan'yō (Nan'yō City Hall); Mogami (Houjin-no-ie); Funagata ("Koseien" Facilities for Supporting People with Disabilities); Ōkura (Ōkura Central Public Hall); Sakegawa (Sakegawa Village Recreational Park); Kawanishi (Daikoin Temple); Oguni (Omiyakoyasuryo Shrine); Shōnai ("Himawarien" Multi-functional Facility for Persons with Disabilities); Tendō (Yamagata Prefectural General Sports Park) | 2020 Summer Paralympics torch relay is located in Yamagata Prefecture |
| Fukushima | 12 August 2021 (day 1): Naraha to Hirono: Naraha (National Training Center J-Village); Hirono (National Training Center J-Village); 13 August 2021 (day 2): Fukushima: Fukushima (Shiki-no-Sato); 14 August 2021 (day 3): Inawashiro: Inawashiro (Kamegajo Castle); 15 August 2021 (day 4): Kōriyama: Kōriyama (Kaiseizan Athletics Track Field) | 2020 Summer Paralympics torch relay is located in Fukushima Prefecture |
| Ibaraki | 16 August 2021 (day 5): Mito: Mito (Ibaraki Prefectural Government Building) | 2020 Summer Paralympics torch relay is located in Ibaraki Prefecture |
| Tochigi | 16 August 2021 (day 5): Utsunomiya: Utsunomiya | 2020 Summer Paralympics torch relay is located in Tochigi Prefecture |
| Gunma | 16 August 2021 (day 5): Tomioka to Isesaki: Tomioka (Gunma Prefectural Tomioka Special Needs School); Numata (Gunma Prefectural Numata Special Needs School); Higashiagatsuma (Gunma Prefectural Agatsuma Special Needs School); Fujioka (Gunma Prefectural Fujioka Special Needs School); Tatebayashi (Gunma Prefectural Shibukawa Special Needs School); Midori (Gunma Prefectural Watarase Special Needs School); Maebashi (Gunma Prefectural School for the Blind and Gunma Prefecutral School for the Deaf); Isesaki (Gunma Prefectural Fureai Sports Plaza) | 2020 Summer Paralympics torch relay is located in Gunma Prefecture |
| Kanagawa | 12 August 2021 (day 1): Matsuda: Matsuda (Matsuda Town Lifelong Learning Center); 13 August 2021 (day 2): Yokohama to Aikawa: Yokohama (Kaiko Hiroba Park); Chigasaki (Chigasaki School for Children with Disabilities); Zushi (Zushi City Hall); Miura (Shiokaze Sports Park); Atsugi (Atsugi City Office); Yamato (Yamato Sports Center); Zama (Zama City Hall); Minamiashigara (Daiyuzan Saijoji); Hayama; Hayama (Hayama Town Hall); Samukawa (Samukawa Chuokoen); Ninomiya (Orchard site at the University of Tokyo); Nakai (Nakai Satomachi Café); Ōi (Ōi Town Health and Welfare Center); Yamakita (Yamakita Town Hall); Kaisei (Ashigari-Go Seto-Yashiki); Hakone (Seisa University Hakone Campus); Manazuru (Manazuru Town Hall); Yugawara (Yugawara Primary School); Aikawa (Aikawa Town Hall); 14 August 2021 (day 3): Kawasaki to Ōiso: Kawasaki (Todoroki Ryokuchi Park); Hiratsuka (Hiratsuka Sogo Park); Kamakura (Ōfuna-Kannon); Odawara (Odawara Castle Park); Hadano (Hadano Culture Hall); Ebina (Ebina City Government Office); Ōiso (Ōiso Town Hall); 15 August 2021 (day 4): Fujisawa to Yokohama: Fujisawa (Enoshima Bentenbashi); Sagamihara (Sagamihara City Hall); Yokosuka (Yokosuka City Hall); Fujisawa (Fujisawa City Hall Annex Building); Isehara (Isehara Civic Center); Ayase (Ayase City Hall); Kiyokawa (Kiyokawa Village Hall); Yokohama | 2020 Summer Paralympics torch relay is located in Kanagawa Prefecture |
| Niigata | 12 August 2021 (day 1): Joetsu to Awashimaura: Jōetsu (Japanese Ski Memorial Museum); Awashimaura (Sakkoi Community Center); 13 August 2021 (day 2): Tainai to Kariwa: Tainai (Kurokawa Oil Field Park, Singleton Memorial Hall); Kariwa (Kariwa Village Lifelong Learning Center "Rapika"); 14 August 2021 (day 3): Kamo to Tsunan: Kamo (Kamo Nanatani Hot Spring "Bijin-no Yu"); Seirō (Seirō Welfare Workshop); Tsunan (Tsunan Agriculture and Jomon Experience Museum "Najomon"); 15 August 2021 (day 4): Niigata to Izumozaki: Niigata (Niigata Athletic Stadium); Nagaoka (Umataka Jōmon Museum); Shibata (Shibata City Hall Fudanotsuji Square); Ojiya (Untoan Temple); Murakami (Murakamishimin Fureai Center); Tsubame (Tsubame Industrial Materials Museum); Sado (Ondeko Dome); Minamiuonuma (Osaki Shrine); Yahiko (Mount Yahiko Ropeway Summit); Izumozaki (Izumozaki Fishing Port); 16 August 2021 (day 5): Sanjō to Niigata: Sanjō (Sanjō Blacksmith Dojo); Kashiwazaki (Kashiwazaki Longrun, Niigata Prefectural Children's Natural Kingdom, Nishiyama Furusato Koen and Kashiwazaki Genkikan); Ojiya (Untoan Temple); Tōkamachi (Tōkamachi City General Gymnasium); Mitsuke (Magokoro-gakuen Care Facility); Itoigawa (Hisui-no-Sato School); Myōkō (Myōkō City General Gymnasium); Gosen (Gosen City Muramatsu Gymnasium); Agano (Agano City Hall); Uonuma (Uonuma City Hall); Tagami (Tagami Roadside Station); Aga (Kirinzan); Yuzawa (Yuzawa Town Office); Sekikawa (Sekikawa Village Public Hall); Niigata (Niigata Fureai Plaza) | 2020 Summer Paralympics torch relay is located in Niigata Prefecture |
| Toyama | 13 August 2021 (day 2): Nanto to Kamiichi: Nanto (Jonan Park); Kamiichi (Onagata Area); 14 August 2021 (day 3): Toyama to Asahi: Toyama (Toyama Science Museum); Kurobe (Kurobe City Hall); Tonami (Tonami Tulip Park); Asahi (Fudodo Ruins); 15 August 2021 (day 4): Takaoka to Toyama: Takaoka (Shoukouji Temple); Imizu (Osima Central Park); Uozu (Ariso Dome); Namerikawa ("Sun Abilities" Namerikawa City Industrial Training Center); Himi (Yanaida Nunooyama Mounded Tomb); Oyabe (Sakuramachi Jomon Park); Funahashi (Funahashi Village Hall); Tateyama (Ashikura Oyama Shrine); Nyūzen (Jobenoma Ruins); Toyama (Fugan Canal Park Water Plaza) | 2020 Summer Paralympics torch relay is located in Toyama Prefecture |
| Ishikawa | 16 August 2021 (day 5): Ishikawa Prefecture: Kanazawa; Komatsu; Nonoichi; Kaga; Nanao; Wajima; Suzu; Kanazawa | 2020 Summer Paralympics torch relay is located in Ishikawa Prefecture |
| Fukui | 12 August 2021 (day 1): Sabae to Ikeda: Sabae; Eiheiji; Ikeda; 14 August 2021 (day 3): Echizen: Echizen; 16 August 2021 (day 5): rest of Fukui Prefecture: Fukui; Tsuruga; Obama; Ōno; Katsuyama; Awara; Sakai; Minamiechizen; Echizen; Mihama; Takahama; Ōi; Wakasa; Fukui; ?? August 2021 (day ?): TBD: Fukui; Tsuruga; Obama; Ōno; Katsuyama; Awara; Sakai; Minamiechizen; Echizen; Mihama; Takahama; Ōi; Wakasa; Fukui | 2020 Summer Paralympics torch relay is located in Fukui Prefecture |
| Yamanashi | 12 August 2021 (day 1): Kōfu to Tabayama: Kōfu; Dōshi; Yamanakako; Kosuge; Tabayama; 13 August 2021 (day 2): Saku: Saku; 16 August 2021 (day 5): Kōfu: Kōfu | 2020 Summer Paralympics torch relay is located in Yamanashi Prefecture |
| Nagano | 12 August 2021 (day 1): Nagano to Iida: Nagano; Matsumoto; Ueda; Fujimi; Ina; Minowa; Tatsuno; Hakuba; Yamanouchi; Iida; 13 August 2021 (day 2): Saku: Saku; 14 August 2021 (day 3): Kiso: Kiso; 16 August 2021 (day 5): Nagano: Nagano | 2020 Summer Paralympics torch relay is located in Nagano Prefecture |
| Gifu | 12 August 2021 (day 1): Ōgaki to Mitake: Ōgaki; Mizunami; Hashima; Gujō; Gero; Anpachi; Ibigawa; Mitake; 13 August 2021 (day 2): Gifu to Yaotsu: Gifu; Takayama; Tajimi; Seki; Mino; Ena; Toki; Kakamigahara; Kani; Kaizu; Yōrō; Tarui; Gōdo; Wanouchi; Ōno; Ikeda; Yaotsu; 14 August 2021 (day 3): Nakatsugawa: Nakatsugawa; 14 August 2021 (day 3): Gifu: Gifu | 2020 Summer Paralympics torch relay is located in Gifu Prefecture |
| Aichi | 12 August 2021 (day 1): Ichinomiya to Taketoyo: Ichinomiya; Tsushima; Hekinan; Kariya; Kitanagoya; Minamichita; Mihama; Taketoyo; 13 August 2021 (day 2): Toyokawa to Higashiura: Toyokawa; Chita; Takahama; Tahara; Tōgō; Agui; Higashiura; 14 August 2021 (day 3): Toyohashi to Tobishima: Toyohashi; Okazaki; Handa; Kasugai; Anjō; Tokoname; Nisshin; Yatomi; Miyoshi; Nagakute; Tobishima; 15 August 2021 (day 4): rest of Aichi Prefecture: Nagoya; Seto; Toyota; Nishio; Tsushima; Gamagōri; Inuyama; Kōnan; Komaki; Inazawa; Shinshiro; Tokai; Ōbu; Chiryū; Owariasahi; Iwakura; Toyoake; Aisai; Kiyosu; Kitanagoya; Ama; Toyoyama; Ōharu; Kanie; Tōei; Nagoya | 2020 Summer Paralympics torch relay is located in Aichi Prefecture |
| Mie | 12 August 2021 (day 1): Inabe to Mihama: Inabe; Yokkaichi; Asahi; Matsusaka; Watarai; Taiki; Minamiise; Iga; Owase; Kihoku; Mihama; 13 August 2021 (day 2): Kisosaki to Ise: Kisosaki; Kawagoe; Ise; 14 August 2021 (day 3): Ōdai to Kiho: Ōdai; Toba; Tamaki; Nabari; Kihō; 15 August 2021 (day 4): Tōin to Tsu: Tōin; Tsu; Meiwa; Shima; Tsu; ?? August 2021 (day ?): TBD: Kuwana; Komono; Suzuka; Kameyama; Taki; Kumano | 2020 Summer Paralympics torch relay is located in Mie Prefecture |
| Shiga | 13 August 2021 (day 2): Kōka to Ise: Kōka; Yasu; 14 August 2021 (day 3): Moriyama: Moriyama; 15 August 2021 (day 4): Higashiōmi: Higashiōmi | 2020 Summer Paralympics torch relay is located in Shiga Prefecture |
| Kyoto | 12 August 2021 (day 1): Nantan: Nantan; 13 August 2021 (day 2): Kyōtamba: Kyōtamba; 15 August 2021 (day 4): Fukuchiyama to Miyazu: Fukuchiyama; Ayabe; Miyazu; 16 August 2021 (day 5): Kyōtanabe to Kyoto: Kyōtanabe; Kyōtango; Seika; Kyoto; ?? August 2021 (day ?): TBD: Maizuru; Uji; Kameoka; Jōyō; Mukō; Nagaokakyō; Yawata; Kizugawa | 2020 Summer Paralympics torch relay is located in Kyoto Prefecture |
| Osaka | 12 August 2021 (day 1): Izumisano to Izumi: Izumisano; Izumi; 13 August 2021 (day 2): Izumiōtsu to Kanan: Izumiōtsu; Takatsuki; Ibaraki; Kawachinagano; Takaishi; Kanan; 14 August 2021 (day 3): Toyonaka to Hirakata: Toyonaka; Hirakata; 15 August 2021 (day 4): Osaka to Misaki: Osaka; Sakai; Ikeda; Kaizuka; Tondabayashi; Matsubara; Fujiidera; Hannan; Misaki; 16 August 2021 (day 5): Kishiwada to Sakai: Kishiwada; Suita; Moriguchi; Yao; Neyagawa; Minoh; Kashiwara; Habikino; Kadoma; Settsu; Higashiōsaka; Shijōnawate; Sennan; Katano; Ōsakasayama; Shimamoto; Toyono; Nose; Kumatori; Tajiri; Taishi; Chihayaakasaka; Sakai; ?? August 2021 (day ?): Daitō: Daitō | 2020 Summer Paralympics torch relay is located in Osaka Prefecture |
| Hyōgo | 12 August 2021 (day 1): Kawanishi to Minamiawaji: Kawanishi; Sanda; Inami; Harima; Nishiwaki; Kamikawa; Tatsuno; Sayō; Sayō; Toyooka; Yabu; Asago; Shin'onsen; Tanba; Minamiawaji; 13 August 2021 (day 2): Inagawa to Awaji: Inagawa; Takasago; Ono; Awaji; 14 August 2021 (day 3): Kobe to Sumoto: Kobe; Nishinomiya; Itami; Takarazuka; Akashi; Kakogawa; Fukusaki; Akō; Kamigōri; Tamba-Sasayama; Sumoto; 15 August 2021 (day 4): Amagasaki to Sumoto: Amagasaki; Himeji; Aioi; Taishi; 16 August 2021 (day 5): Ichikawa to Kobe: Ichikawa; Kami; Kobe; ?? August 2021 (day ?): Ashiya: Ashiya | 2020 Summer Paralympics torch relay is located in Hyōgo Prefecture |
| Nara | 16 August 2021 (day 5): Ōyodo: Ōyodo | 2020 Summer Paralympics torch relay is located in Nara Prefecture |
| Wakayama | 16 August 2021 (day 5): Tanabe: Tanabe | 2020 Summer Paralympics torch relay is located in Wakayama Prefecture |
| Tottori | 12 August 2021 (day 1): Tottori to Yonago: Tottori; Yonago; 16 August 2021 (day 5): Kurayoshi: Kurayoshi | 2020 Summer Paralympics torch relay is located in Tottori Prefecture |
| Shimane | 12 August 2021 (day 1): Unnan to Hamada: Unnan; Masuda; Ōda; Tsuwano; Ōnan; Hamada; 13 August 2021 (day 2): Matsue: Matsue; 15 August 2021 (day 4): Yasugi to Izumo: Yasugi; Gōtsu; Izumo; 16 August 2021 (day 5): Matsue: Matsue | 2020 Summer Paralympics torch relay is located in Shimane Prefecture |
| Okayama | 12 August 2021 (day 1): Ibara to Nishiawakura: Ibara; Sōja; Takahashi; Bizen; Setouchi; Mimasaka; Nishiawakura; 13 August 2021 (day 2): Tsuyama to Kibichūō: Tsuyama; Kasaoka; Akaiwa; Asakuchi; Hayashima; Shinjō; Shōō; Kibichūō; 15 August 2021 (day 4): Niimi to Nagi: Niimi; Maniwa; Kagamino; Nagi; 16 August 2021 (day 5): rest of Okayama Prefecture: Okayama; Kurashiki; Tamano; Wake; Satoshō; Yakage; Kumenan; Okayama | 2020 Summer Paralympics torch relay is located in Okayama Prefecture |
| Kōchi | ?? August 2021 (day ?): TBD: TBD | 2020 Summer Paralympics torch relay is located in Kochi Prefecture |
| Shizuoka | 17 August 2021 (day 6): Shizuoka to Hamamatsu: Shizuoka; Hamamatsu; Numazu; Atami; Mishima; Itō; Shimada; Fuji; Iwata; Yaizu; Kakegawa; Fujieda; Gotemba; Fukuroi; Shimoda; Susono; Kosai; Izu; Omaezaki; Kikugawa; Izunokuni; Makinohara; Higashiizu; Kawazu; Minamiizu; Matsuzaki; Nishiizu; Kannami; Shimizu; Nagaizumi; Oyama; Yoshida; Kawanehon; Mori; Shizuoka; Hamamatsu | 2020 Summer Paralympics torch relay is located in Shizuoka Prefecture |
| Hiroshima | 12 August 2021 (day 1): Miyoshi to Hamamatsu: Miyoshi (Miyoshi Fudoki no Oka); Shōbara (Bihoku Hillside Park); Fuchū (Aki Fuchū Lifelong Learning Center Kusunoki Plaza); Akiōta (Kake Children's Club); 13 August 2021 (day 2): Kure to Hamamatsu: Kure (Yamato Wharf, Yamato Museum); Mihara (Mihara Region Plaza); Fuchū (Aki Fuchū Lifelong Learning Center Kusunoki Plaza); Fukuyama (Fukuyama Fureai Land); Ōtake (Hikari Children's Club, Midori Children's Club and Asunaro Children's Club); Hatsukaichi (Hatsukaichi City Hall); Akitakata (Akitakata Citizen Culture Center); Saka (Saka Townspeople Center); Kitahiroshima (Oasa Taiikukan); Sera (Sera Town Hall); Jinsekikōgen (Yuki Gymnasium); Akiōta (Kake Children's Club) | 2020 Summer Paralympics torch relay is located in Hiroshima Prefecture |
| Chiba | 18 August 2021 (day 7): Chiba Prefecture: Chiba (Kasori Shell Mounds); Chōshi (Aozora-Misaki); Ichikawa (Ichikawa City Hall); Funabashi (Funabashi City Hall); Tateyama (Tateyama City Hall); Kisarazu (Ekimae Office, Kisarazu City Hall); Matsudo (Matsudo Central Park); Noda (Noda City Hall); Mobara (Mobara City Hall); Narita (Naritasan Shinsho-ji); Sakura (Sakura City Hall); Tōgane (Tōgane Arena); Asahi (Asahi Sports Forest Park); Narashino (Hananomi-en Welfare Service Business Establishment for People with Disabilities); Kashiwa (Kashiwa City Hall); Katsuura (Isumi School for Special Needs Education); Ichihara (Giombara Shell Mounds, Kokubunji Central Park); Nagareyama (Kikkoman Arena); Yachiyo (Yachiyo City Hall and Peace Monument); Abiko (Abiko City Hall); Kamogawa (Saijyo Elementary School); Kamagaya (Karuizawa Kamagaya City); Kimitsu (Kimitsu City Hall); Futtsu (Futtsu City Hall); Urayasu (Higashino Patio, Urayasu City Higashino District Welfare Facility); Yotsukaidō (Yotsukaidō Comprehensive Park); Sodegaura (Comprehensive Sports Park); Yachimata (Yachimata City Sports Plaza); Inzai (Inzai City Hall); Shiroi (Shiroi City Hall); Tomisato (Tomisato Central Park Baseball Field); Sōsa (Sōsa City Hall); Minamibōsō (Minamibōsō City Tomiyama Multipurpose Athletic Field); Katori (Katori City Hall); Sanmu (Naruto Cultural Center Nogiku Plaza); Isumi (Isumi School for Special Needs Education); Ōamishirasato (Ōamishirasato City Hall); Shisui (Chuo-dai Public Land); Sakae (Sakae Town Hall); Kōzaki (Kōzaki City Hall); Tako (Tako Town Gymnasium); Kōzaki (Tonosho Elementary School); Tōnoshō (Tōnoshō Elementary School); Kujūkuri (Kujukuri Town Central Public Hall); Shibayama (Shibayama Town Welfare Center "Yasuragi-no-Sato"); Yokoshibahikari (Community Activity Support Center "Tanpopo"); Ichinomiya (Ichinomiya Town Hall); Mutsuzawa (Mutsuzawa Town Hall); Chōsei (Hitotsumatsukoubou); Shirako (Shirako Town Hall); Nagara (Nagara Town Hall); Chōnan (Chōnan City Hall); Ōtaki (Isumi School for Special Needs Education); Onjuku (Isumi School for Special Needs Education); Kyonan (Kyonan Town Hall); Ichihara (Ichihara Suporeku Park); Chiba (Chiba Port Tower) | 2020 Summer Paralympics torch relay is located in Chiba Prefecture |
| Saitama | 19 August 2021 (Route 1; day 8): Satte to Asaka: Satte; Hasuda; Shiraoka; Kawajima; Iruma; Asaka (Asaka Central Park Athletics Stadium); 19 August 2021 (Route 2; day 8): Hannō to Asaka: Hannō (Tove Jansson Akebono Children's Forest Park); Hanyū (Hanyū City Industrial and Cultural Hall); Ina (Ina Town Hall); Moroyama (Moroyama General Gymnasium); Ogose (Sekai Mumei Senshi no Haka); Ogawa (Ogawa Town Hall); Yoshimi (Roadside Station Ichigo-no-Sato Yoshimi); Hatoyama (Hatoyama Town Hall); Tokigawa (Tokigawa Sports Center); Yokoze (Yokoze Town Hall); Ogano (Ogano Junior High School); Higashichichibu (Higashichichibu Village Hall); Misato (TBD); Kamikawa (Kanasana Shrine); Kamisato (Kamisato Town Office); Yorii (Yorii Town Hall); Matsubushi (Matsubushi Town Hall); Saitama (Keyaki Hiroba); Asaka (Asaka Central Park Athletics Stadium) | 2020 Summer Paralympics torch relay is located in Saitama Prefecture |

=== Tokyo metropolitan leg ===

20 August 2021 (day 16)
1. Shinjuku
2. Nakano
3. Toshima
4. Kita
5. Bunkyō
21 August 2021 (day 17)
6. Chiyoda
7. Taitō
8. Sumida
9. Kōtō
10. Edogawa
22 August 2021 (day 18)
11. Kunitachi
12. Hino
13. Tachikawa
14. Higashiyamato
15. Kokubunji
23 August 2021 (day 17)
16. Nishitōkyō
17. Mitaka
18. Fuchū
19. Chōfu
20. Setagaya
24 August 2021 (day 17)
21. Chūō
22. Minato
23. Chiyoda (Hibiya)
24. Shinjuku
25. New National Stadium

== Ceremony changes ==
Due to the ongoing COVID-19 pandemic and several prefectures declared state of emergency amid COVID-19 surge and in Shizuoka Prefecture's case, the 2021 Atami landslide, many of the public stages of the relay were truncated to be more ceremonial rather than functional such as alternative events. Participants of the relay would carry the torch for about 30 meters before passing the flame to another participant rather than carrying it for long stretches.

== End of torch relay ==
At the 2020 Summer Paralympics opening ceremony, the relay ended with the lighting of the cauldron. Yui Kamiji, Karin Morisaki, and Shunsuke Uchida lit the cauldron.
