= List of cities in Kanagawa Prefecture by population =

The following list sorts all cities (including towns and villages) in the Japanese prefecture of Kanagawa with a population of more than 10,000 according to the 2020 Census. As of October 1, 2020, 29 places fulfill this criterion and are listed here. This list refers only to the population of individual cities, towns and villages within their defined limits, which does not include other municipalities or suburban areas within urban agglomerations.

== List ==
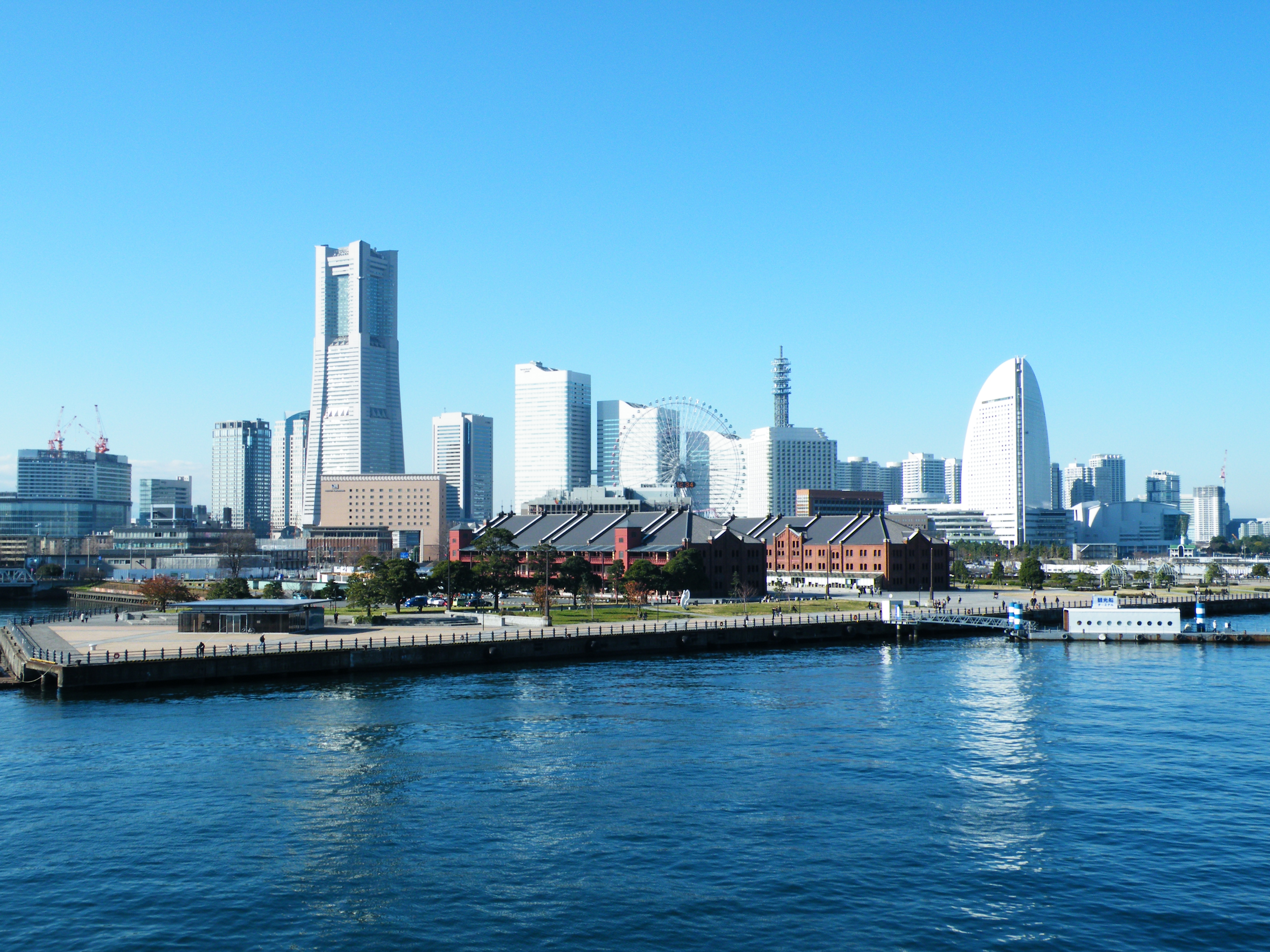
Yokohama

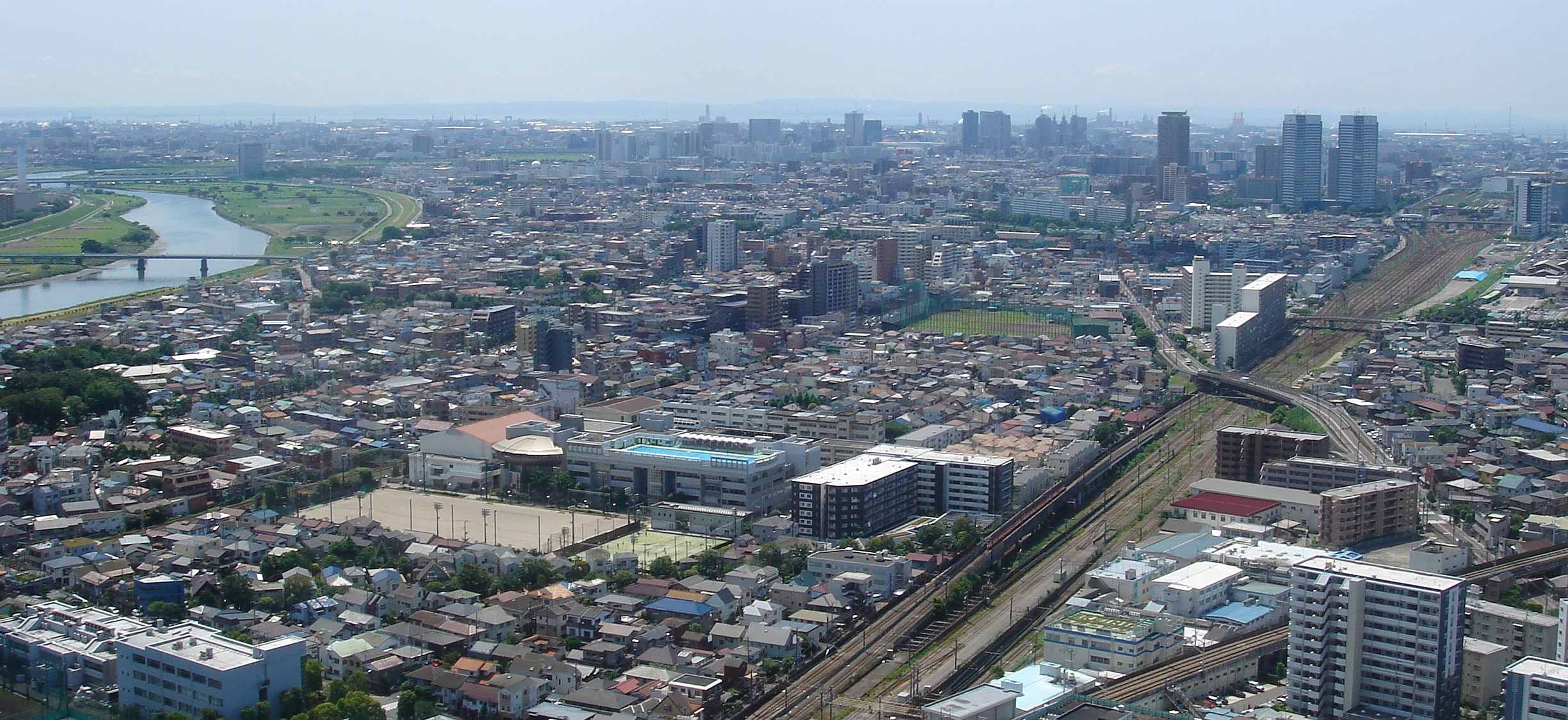
Kawasaki

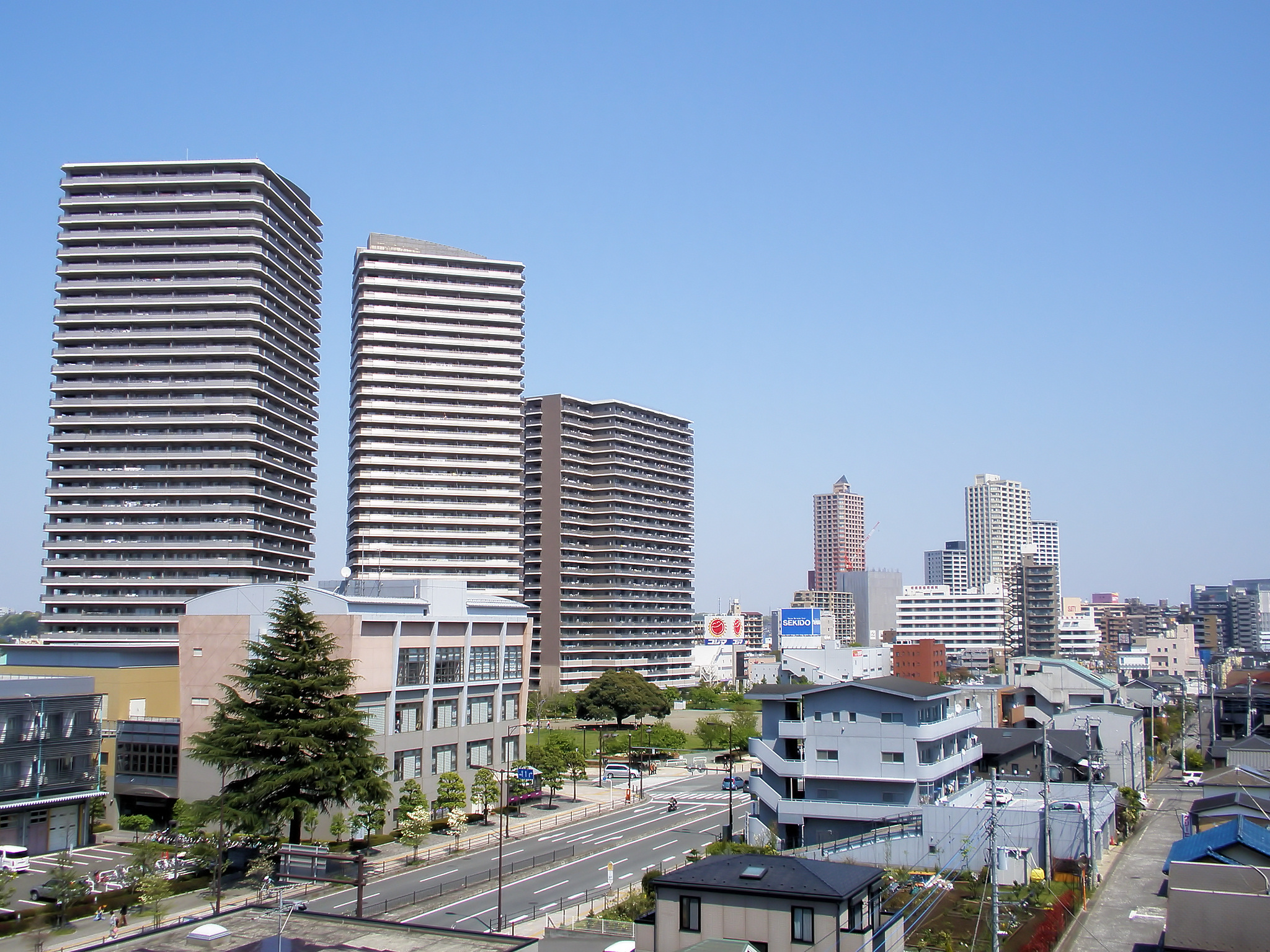
Sagamihara

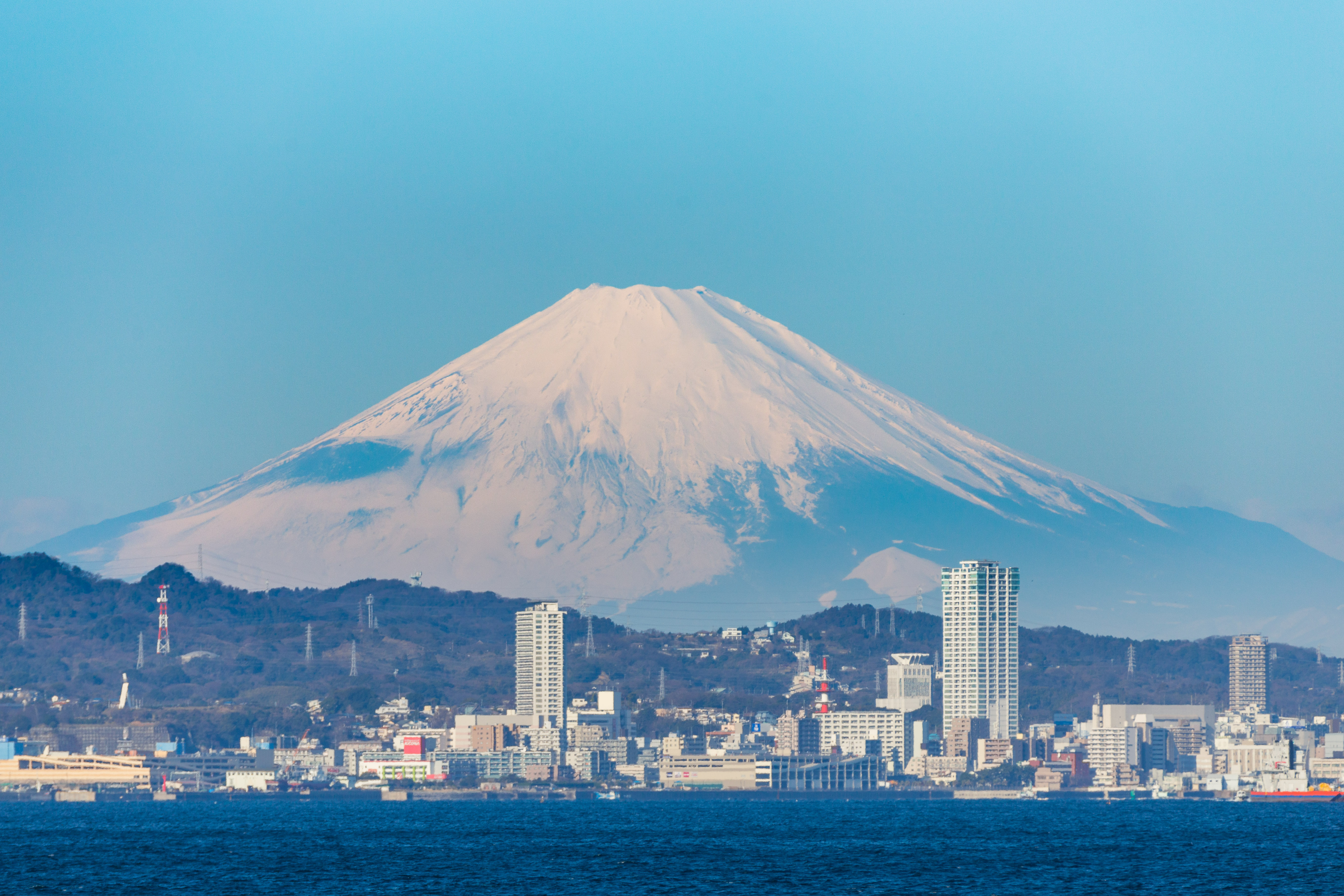
Yokosuka

The following table lists the 29 cities, villages and towns in Kanagawa with a population of at least 10,000 on October 1, 2020, according to the 2020 Census. The table also gives an overview of the evolution of the population since the 1995 census.

Rank (2020)	Name	Status	2020	2015	2010	2005	2000	1995
1	Yokohama	City	3,778,318	3,724,844	3,688,773	3,579,628	3,426,651	3,307,136
2	Kawasaki	City	1,539,081	1,475,213	1,425,512	1,327,011	1,249,905	1,202,820
3	Sagamihara	City	725,302	720,780	717,515	701,620	681,150	646,516
4	Fujisawa	City	437,155	423,894	409,657	396,014	379,185	368,651
5	Yokosuka	City	388,504	406,586	418,325	426,178	428,645	432,193
6	Hiratsuka	City	258,524	258,227	260,780	258,958	254,633	253,822
7	Chigasaki	City	242,603	239,348	235,081	228,420	220,809	212,874
8	Yamato	City	239,269	232,922	228,186	221,220	212,761	203,933
9	Atsugi	City	223,747	225,714	224,420	222,403	217,369	208,627
10	Odawara	City	188,986	194,086	198,327	198,741	200,173	200,103
11	Kamakura	City	172,821	173,019	174,314	171,158	167,583	170,329
12	Hadano	City	162,579	167,378	170,145	168,317	168,142	164,722
13	Ebina	City	136,581	130,190	127,707	123,764	117,519	113,430
14	Zama	City	132,180	128,737	129,436	128,174	125,694	118,159
15	Isehara	City	101,839	101,514	101,039	100,579	99,544	98,123
16	Ayase	City	83,964	84,460	83,167	81,767	81,019	80,680
17	Zushi	City	56,981	57,425	58,302	58,033	57,281	56,578
18	Samukawa	Town	48,366	47,936	47,672	47,457	46,369	47,438
19	Miura	City	42,098	45,289	48,352	49,861	52,253	54,152
20	Minamiashigara	City	40,859	43,306	44,020	44,134	44,156	43,596
21	Aikawa	Town	39,894	40,343	42,089	42,045	42,760	43,088
22	Ōiso	Town	31,673	31,550	33,032	32,590	32,259	32,285
23	Hayama	Town	31,627	32,096	32,766	31,531	30,413	29,883
24	Ninomiya	Town	27,578	28,378	29,522	30,247	30,802	30,576
25	Yugawara	Town	23,433	25,026	26,848	27,430	27,721	28,389
26	Kaisei	Town	18,333	17,013	16,369	15,123	13,396	12,698
27	Ōi	Town	17,138	17,033	17,972	17,530	16,582	15,599
28	Hakone	Town	11,303	11,786	13,853	14,206	15,829	18,411
29	Matsuda	Town	10,840	11,171	11,676	12,399	12,987	13,270
