= Sannai-Maruyama Site =

Jōmon period archaeological site and museum

- 三内丸山遺跡 (Japanese)
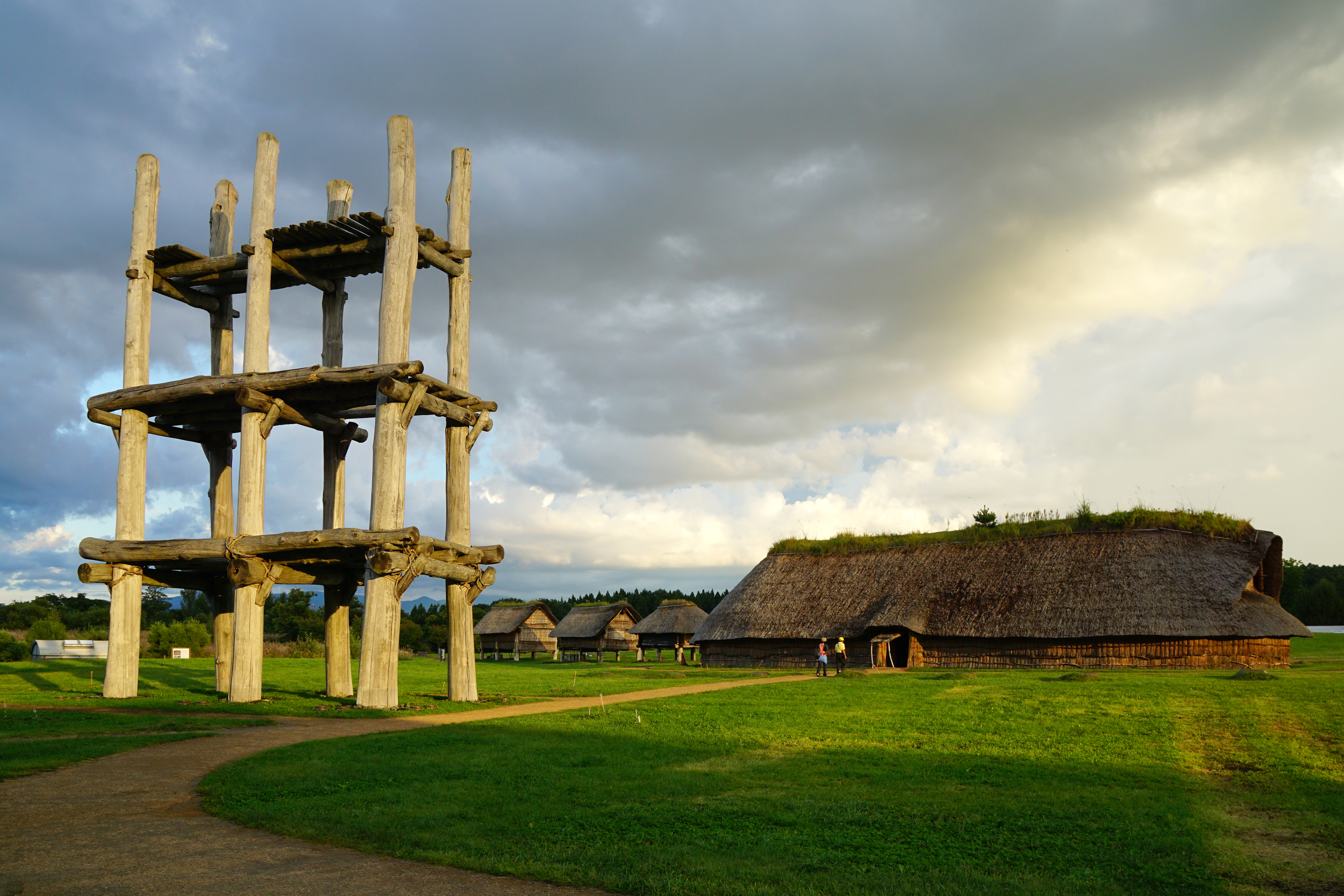
- Reconstructed six-pillar structure and long pit-dwelling at Sannai-Maruyama

- Sannai-Maruyama site Sannai-Maruyama site (Japan)
- 40°48′37″N 140°41′51″E
- Periods: Early–Middle Jōmon period, Heian period, Muromachi period
- Location: Aomori, Japan
- Region: Tōhoku region

Site notes
- Area: 40 hectares (400,000 m^{2}; 99 acres)
- Excavation dates: 1953-1967,1976-1987, 1992-onwards
- Archaeologists: Keio University, others
- Public access: Yes (archaeological park)
- Website: sannaimaruyama.pref.aomori.jp

The Sannai-Maruyama Site (Japanese: 三内丸山遺跡, Hepburn: Sannai-Maruyama iseki) is an archaeological site and museum located in the Maruyama and Yasuda neighborhoods to the southwest of central Aomori City in Aomori Prefecture in northern Japan, containing the ruins of a very large Jōmon period settlement. The ruins of a 40-hectare (400,000 m^{2}; 99-acre) settlement were discovered in 1992, when Aomori Prefecture started surveying the area for a planned baseball stadium. Archaeologists have used this site to further their understanding of the transition to sedentism and the life of the Jōmon people. Excavation has led to the discovery of storage pits, above ground storage, and long houses. These findings demonstrate a change in the structure of the community, architecture, and organizational behaviors of these people. Because of the extensive information and importance, this site was designated as a Special National Historical Site of Japan in 2000, and a UNESCO World Heritage Site as part of the Jōmon Prehistoric Sites in Northern Japan collection in 2021. Today the public can visit the site, its various reconstructions of Jōmon structures, and a museum that displays and houses artifacts collected on the site, which have collectively been designated an Important Cultural Property of Japan.

== Etymology ==
The Sannai-Maruyama Site is not named after people. It is named after two districts of Aomori City and their geographic features among which the site is located: Maruyama: 'Circular mountain or mound' (丸山) and Sannai: 'Three insides' (三内), referring to the three ravines in the area. The district of Maruyama is part of Sannai ward. Part of the complex is in the district of Yasuda: 'Peaceful field' (安田).

== Jōmon era ==
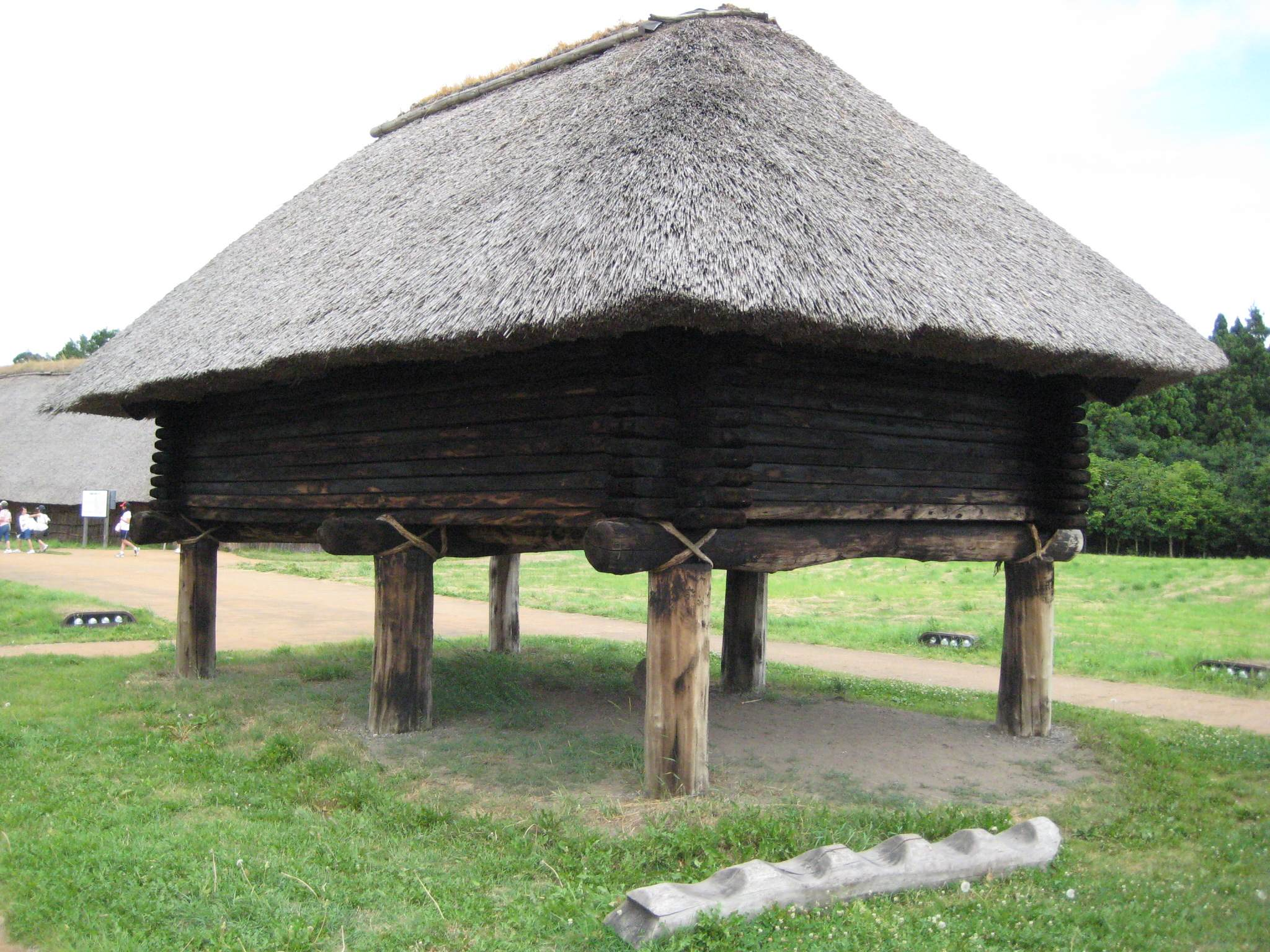
Elevated storehouse at Sannai-Maruyama

The Sannai-Maruyama settlement was occupied from the middle of the Early Jōmon period to the late Middle Jōmon period (3900 – 2200 BCE), and is the largest Jōmon settlement yet discovered in Japan, with 648 pit dwellings. The population peaked during the Middle period. It is located on a 20 meters (66 feet) high fluvial terrace on a coastal terrace on the right bank of the Okidate River, at the tip of a ridge extending southwest from the Hakkōda Mountains. The area a woodland area of oak/nut-bearing broadleaf forests.

=== Hunter-gatherer period ===
Initially, the Sannai-Maruyama site was used on a temporary basis by hunter-gatherers beginning around 3900 BCE. There were large pits used for storage and can be concealed since they were underground, which was preferred by mobile populations in many parts of the world. The first settlers of the site lived in pit houses. These dwellings typically were about 3–4 meters (9.8–13.1 ft) in diameter. The site gradually changed from a seasonal camp, to the home of a more mobile society, and finally to a settled village. Evidence of this sedentary lifestyle can be found in the form of intense use of natural resources such as nuts, fish, and a wide diversity of plants–such as many varieties of beans, bottle gourd, and burdock, as well as changes in storage facilities.

=== Sedentary period ===
The final shift to a sedentary lifestyle occurred around 2900 BCE. The inhabitants switched from use of storage pits to above ground storehouses, revealed by pillar-supported structures that lack the fire pits of the pit-dwellings. An interpretation of this change was that the site's population had become more sedentary. Also, longhouses began showing up around this time, which is an indicator of a more sedentary lifestyle. Long houses were large, oval-shaped structures. The longest one found at the site was 32 meters (105 feet) long. Scholars believe longhouses were used for meeting places, workshops, or living space. Pit houses were still being inhabited at the same time that longhouses existed on the landscape. The large pillar structure dates to this time period. Construction on this scale implies the existence of a coordinated labor force due to the sheer size of these posts. The placement of the posts would have required the cooperation of several people. Interpretations of the use of this large post-supported platform is that it was a base for a tower, or even a shrine.

Genetic testing of chestnuts excavated from the site revealed that they were cultivated. Numerous nut shells (chestnut, walnut, horse chestnut, etc.) were also unearthed, as well as cultivated plants such as perilla, gourd, burdock, and beans. The people of Sannai-Maruyama did not rely solely on gathering natural resources; they planted numerous nut trees around the settlement, and it is possible that they cultivated annual plants. This suggests that the site may have housed several hundred people. At the "Northern Mahoroba Symposium" held in Aomori City in September 1994, it was suggested that there may have been as many as 500 residents at the peak of the late Middle Jōmon period, but this was disputed. Many remains of deer, wild boar, hares, and flying squirrels have been found at the site.

One of Sannai-Maruyama's most famous structures, a reconstruction of a large six-pillared building, was originally built around 2,600 BCE. This structure consisted of six large chestnut pillars in two parallel lines that are believed to have held a series of platforms. Each one of these pillars was around 1 meter (3.3 feet) in diameter and was placed exactly 4.2 meters (14 feet) apart. While the pillars are often evaluated for their size, what is also noteworthy is that the spacing, width, and depth of the pillar holes are all uniform: 4.2 meters, 2 meters, and 2 meters, respectively. This indicates the existence of surveying techniques and the advanced technological capabilities of the people who lived here. In particular, 4.2 meters is a multiple of 35 centimeters, and the 35-centimeter unit has been confirmed at other sites, suggesting that a unit of length, perhaps the "Jōmon ruler" (縄文尺, Jōmon shaku) was widely shared as a common standard. Constructing such a large structure would have required a large labor force, suggesting the unity of the village residents and the presence of leaders who could effectively guide them. Most of the wood structure, like other biological remains at the site, deteriorated due to the acidity of the soil; however, the bottoms of the pillars were preserved because they were waterlogged due to their proximity to a marsh. The purpose of this structure is uncertain. It could have been a monument, watchtower, religious shrine, observatory, or a lighthouse overlooking Mutsu Bay. It is also possible this structure was used in for calendrical calcutions as it aligns with sunrise on the summer solstice and sunset on the winter solstice.

Remains of other six-pillared buildings from different time periods have been found throughout the site. Many of the post holes from these buildings overlap each other, which suggests that the structures were being rebuilt in the same location and facing the same direction.

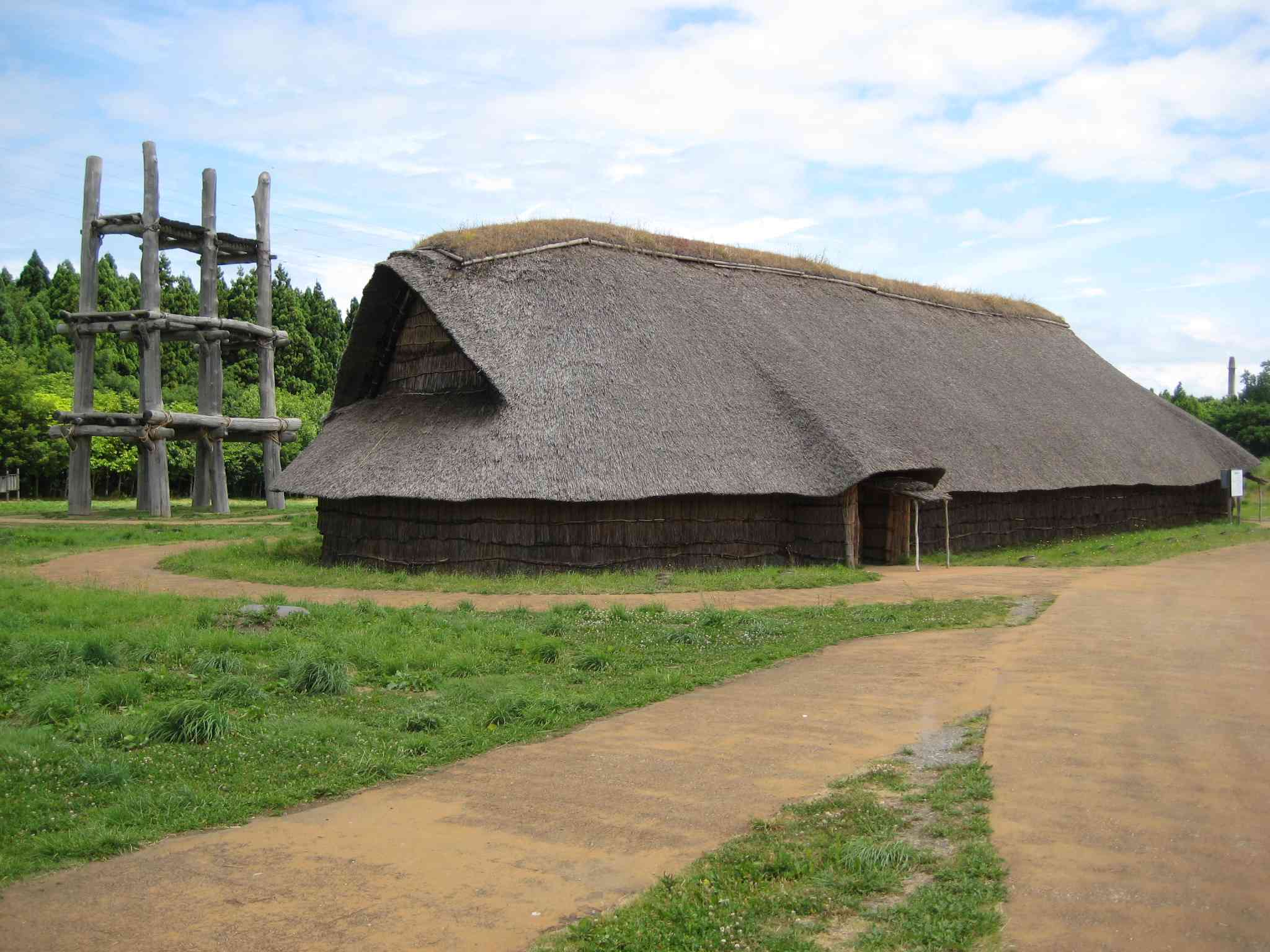
Reconstruction of a Jōmon period longhouse at Sannai-Maruyama. Only a few longhouses were found; they may have been meeting halls or workshops.

Similar large wooden structures have been found at other sites in Japan and the rest of Eurasia, including a wooden precursor to Stonehenge. The Sannai-Maruyama Site is similar to Stonehenge in that some structures align with celestial events. The alignment of other posts at Sannai-Maruyama Site and the Ōyu Stone Circles in nearby Akita Prefecture indicate the Jōmon people understood the movement of celestial bodies.

The site also contained two middens with domestic refuse, two large mounds, containing refuse, including ceremonial artifacts. A large amount of earthenware and stoneware were recovered from these middens, including approximately 2,000 clay figures, wood products, bones and antler objects and tools, and fragments of baskets and lacquerware. The site also contained over 500 burial pits for adult remains, and numerous jar-burials for infants. Some burials, hypothesized to be for the social elite, were enclosed within stone circles.

Some objects made of jade, amber and obsidian could only have come to this site via trade because they were not native to the area. The Jōmon are known to have had an extensive trade network. For example, Moroiso-style pottery, which is just south of Tokyo, in the Kansai region, has been found as far south as the Satogi site in Okayama Prefecture and as far north as the Taigi and Tashirojima sites in Miyagi Prefecture, both about 500 kilometers (310 miles) from Moroiso. While Moroiso pottery is not known to have made it to Sannai-Maruyama, significant trade did occur there, including some pottery. Most pottery was made locally at Sannai-Maruyama.

Since Itoigawa is the main jade producing region, the discovery of jade proves trade with the Joetsu region in Niigata Prefecture. Flat-bottomed cylindrical pottery and earrings have been noted to have similarities with the Liao civilization (Xinglongwa culture) of mainland China.

=== Demise ===
The settlement at Sannai-Maruyama ended around 2300 BCE for uncertain reasons. Its abandonment was likely due to the population subsistence economy being unable to sustain itself with the available food resources and with its end being spurred on by the reduced amount of natural resources during neoglaciation, specifically the 4.2-kiloyear event. During this time temperature dropped 2.6 °C (4.7 °F), which also influenced the collapse of settlements and civilizations in other parts of the world. The effects of global warming in relation to the effects the ancient cooling had on the site's population reveal the impact such a change in temperature can have on human society. During the Heian period, a portion of the site was resettled by new inhabitants who also built pit dwellings, and during the Muromachi period, a portion of the site was occupied by a medieval fortification.

== Discovery and aftermath ==
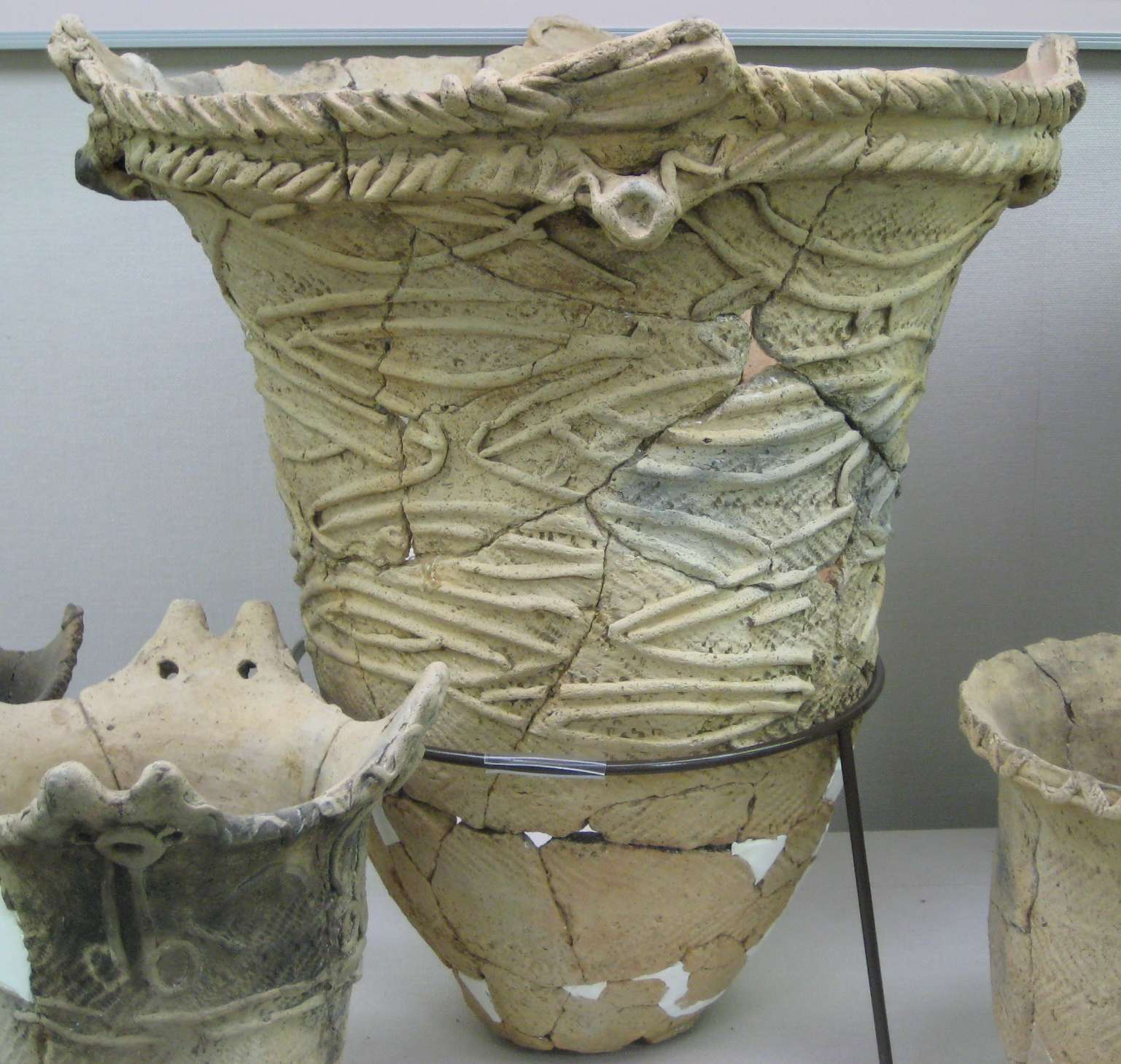
Ento style pottery recovered from Sannai-Maruyama. The word "Ento" means "cylindrical". This vessel is a long structure with a wide orifice at the top, and ornamental details. Ento vessels were commonly decorated with cord marks.

The presence of ruins at Sannai-Maruyama was known even during the Edo period, as travelers through the area commented in finding pottery sherds and clay figurines. A record of the Hirosaki Domain by Rikkoku Yamazaki records the excavation of clay figurines in the entry for January 2, 1623. The travelogue Sumika no Yama by Masumi Sugae, records the excavation of a large number of roof tiles, jars, and clay figurines at the site of the collapse of an old dam in the village of Sannai in the entry for April 14, 1796. The first survey was conducted by Keio University and the Aomori City Board of Education from 1953 to 1967 and from 1976 and 1987 AD, the Board of Education of Aomori Prefecture and the city of Aomori conducted further excavations on the southern part of the site.

The true significance of the site was not recognized until the start of construction of a prefectural baseball stadium in 1992. Due to the large number of finds during the rescue archaeology conducted at the time, including the foundations for the large six-pillared building in June 1994, Aomori Prefecture cancelled the baseball stadium project and decided to preserve the site in August 1994 as an archaeological park. After this was announced a number of the excavations were backfilled to protect the site. Since 1994, around 26 additional test excavations have been done. These excavations have resulted in around 40% of the site being excavated. In March 1997 a 12 meters (39 feet) wide road that went through the burial mounds was found, with pit graves on each side. This road went out from the middle of the settlement eastward for 420 meters (1,380 feet). The designated park is now 40-hectare (400,000 m^{2}; 99-acre).

In April 2019, the site was consolidated with the nearby museum, the Jōmon Jiyūkan (縄文時遊館). Administratively, the archaeological site and the museum had been separate entities, but now function as a single historic site. Today the public can visit the site, its various reconstructions of Jōmon structures, and the museum. The artifacts collected on the site were collectively designated an Important Cultural Property of Japan in 2003.

The Sannai-Maruyama site designated a National Historic Site on March 5, 1997, and a Special National Historic Site on November 24, 2000. The Sannai-Maruyama Site is the centerpiece of the Jōmon Prehistoric Sites in Northern Japan, a group of Jōmon period archaeological sites in Hokkaidō and northern Tōhoku that was recommended by Japan in 2020 for inclusion to the UNESCO World Heritage List, under criteria iii and iv. It was first placed on the list World Heritage in 2009, and was officially inscribed on the World Heritage List on July 27, 2021.

The site hosted as the collection point for Aomori Prefecture's Paralympic flame that was collected from around Japan to be sent to the New National Stadium in Tokyo as part of 2020 Summer Paralympics torch relay.

== Tourism and controversy ==
When the idea of charging admission to the site was proposed, there was an outpouring of opposition, with some arguing that "the presence of a white dome next to six pillars does not represent a Jomon appearance at all" (though the dome remains in place to this day). Although the plan to charge admission was abandoned for a time, in April 2019 the site and Jōmon Jiyūkan became the "Sannai-Maruyama Site Center," and admission was made free. However, during certain event periods, the permanent exhibition is free, and special exhibitions are discounted.

The 450m long Sannai-Maruyama Viaduct, which crosses Japan National Route 7 and the Okidate River on the Tōhoku Shinkansen line, is adjacent to the site. Since its opening on December 4, 2010, it has been possible to see the ruins from a distance, albeit for a few seconds, from inside the train. The bridge was designed with care to avoid damaging the scenery, and an extradosed bridge structure was used.

A survey conducted in 2024 found that the Sannai-Maruyama Site was by far the most popular among foreign tourists among the World Heritage Sites of the Jōmon Period in Hokkaido and Northern Tohoku. The unique Japanese culture of the Jōmon Period, especially its explanation of the period without conflict, and the experiential consumption of experiences such as making fires and making stone tools, were of great interest to Westerners, revealing a hidden demand for perspectives that Japanese people may not be aware of.

== See also ==
- Jōmon Archaeological Sites in Hokkaidō, Northern Tōhoku, and other regions
- List of Historic Sites of Japan (Aomori)
- List of Special Places of Scenic Beauty, Special Historic Sites and Special Natural Monuments
- Ōdai Yamamoto I Site
