= Kami-Ōi Station =

Railway station in Ōi, Kanagawa Prefecture, Japan

CB02 Kami-Ōi Station 上大井駅
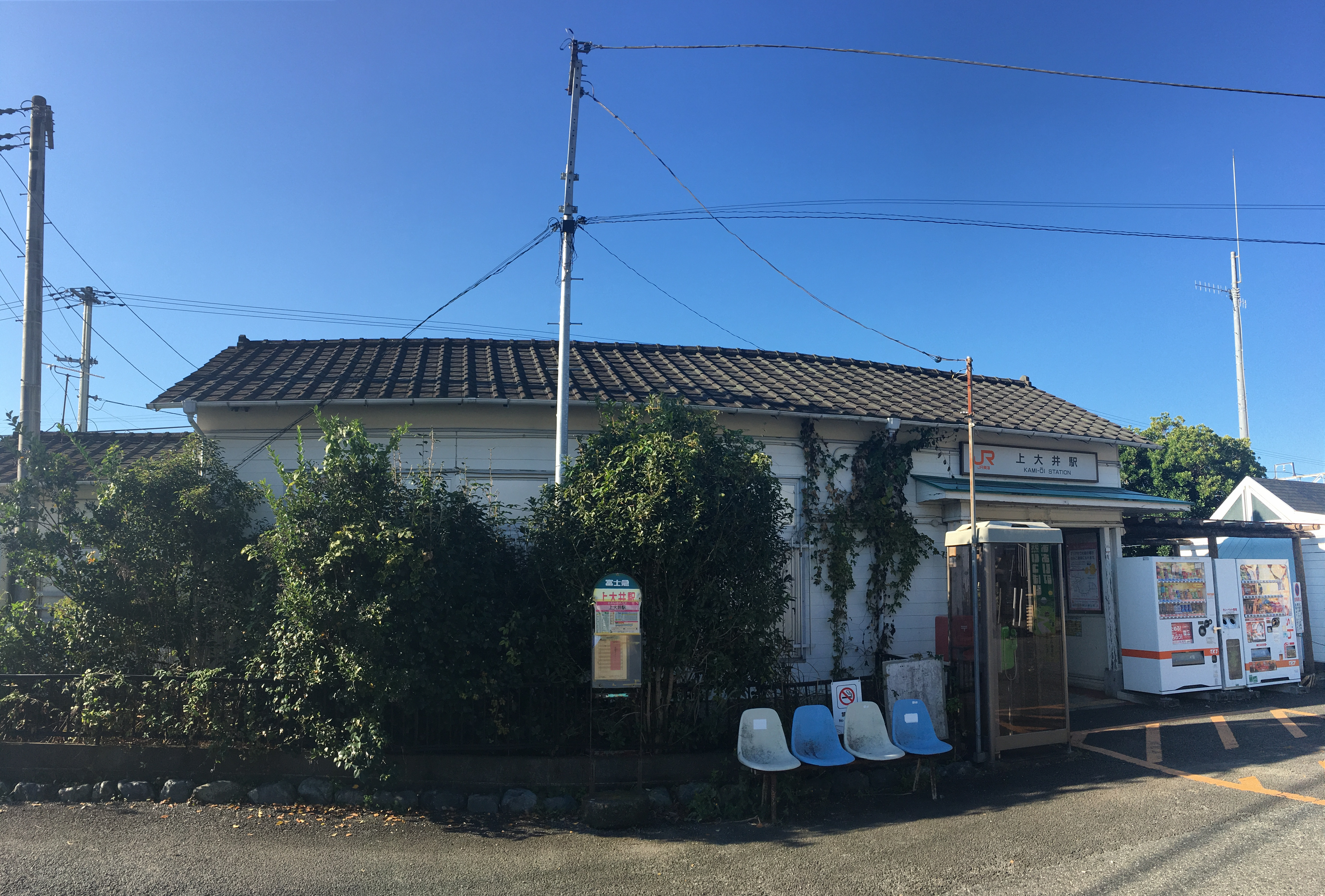
- Kami-Ōi Station, December 2022

General information
- Location: Kami-Ōi, Ōi Town, Ashigarakami District, Kanagawa Prefecture 258-0016; Japan
- Coordinates: 35°19′18″N 139°9′48.26″E
- Operator: JR Central
- Line: Gotemba Line
- Distance: 6.5 km (4.0 mi) from Kōzu
- Platforms: 2 side platforms
- Connections: Bus terminal

Construction
- Structure type: At grade

Other information
- Status: Unstaffed
- Station code: CB02
- Website: https://ja.wikipedia.org/wiki/上大井駅

History
- Opened: 1 June 1948; 78 years ago

Passengers
- FY2018: 490 daily

Services
Preceding station	JR Central	Following station
Sagami-Kaneko CB03 towards Numazu	Gotemba Line	Shimo-Soga CB01 towards Kōzu
Location
- Location within Kanagawa Prefecture Location within Kanto Area Location within Japan

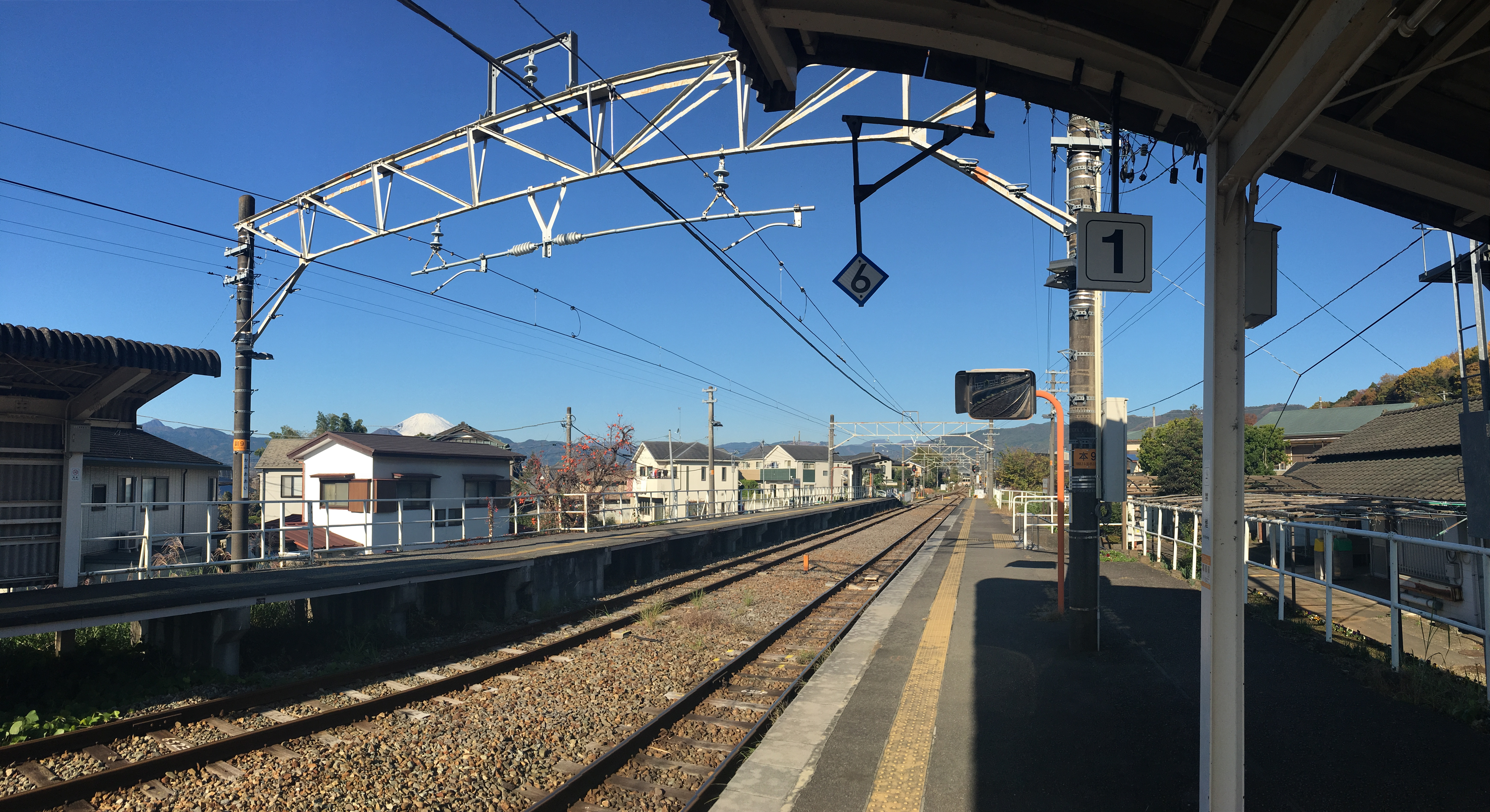
Station platforms, 2022

Kami-Ōi Station (上大井駅, Kami-Ōi-eki) is a passenger railway station located in the southern part of the town of Ōi, Kanagawa, Japan, operated by Central Japan Railway Company (JR Central).

== Lines ==
Kami-Ōi Station is served by the Gotemba Line and is 6.5 kilometers from the terminus of the line at Kōzu Station.

== Station layout ==
Kami-Ōi Station has two opposed side platforms and wooden station building. When it opened, it had only a single through platform, but just before the electrification of the Gotemba Line, facilities for trains' crossing had been attached and the station came to have two platforms. The station is unattended.

== History ==
Kami-Ōi Station was opened on June 1, 1948 on the Japan National Railways (JNR) Gotemba Line for passenger service only. The route through the station was electrified in 1968. Freight services were discontinued on February 1, 1971. On April 1, 1987 along with privatization and division of JNR, the station came under control of the Central Japan Railway Company. It has been unattended since March 22, 1997.

Station numbering was introduced to the Gotemba Line in March 2018; Kami-Ōi Station was assigned station number CB02.

== Passenger statistics ==
In fiscal 2018, the station was used by an average of 490 passengers daily (boarding passengers only).

The passenger figures (boarding passengers only) for previous years are as shown below.

Fiscal year	daily average
2005	462
2010	500
2015	477

== Surrounding area ==
- Ōi Town Office
- Odawara City Office Soga Branch Office
- The Dai-ichi Mutual Life Insurance Company Ōi Main Office
- Ebara Foods Industry Central Research Facility

== See also ==
- List of railway stations in Japan
