= Shimo-Soga Station =

Railway station in Odawara, Kanagawa Prefecture, Japan

CB01 Shimo-Soga Station 下曽我駅
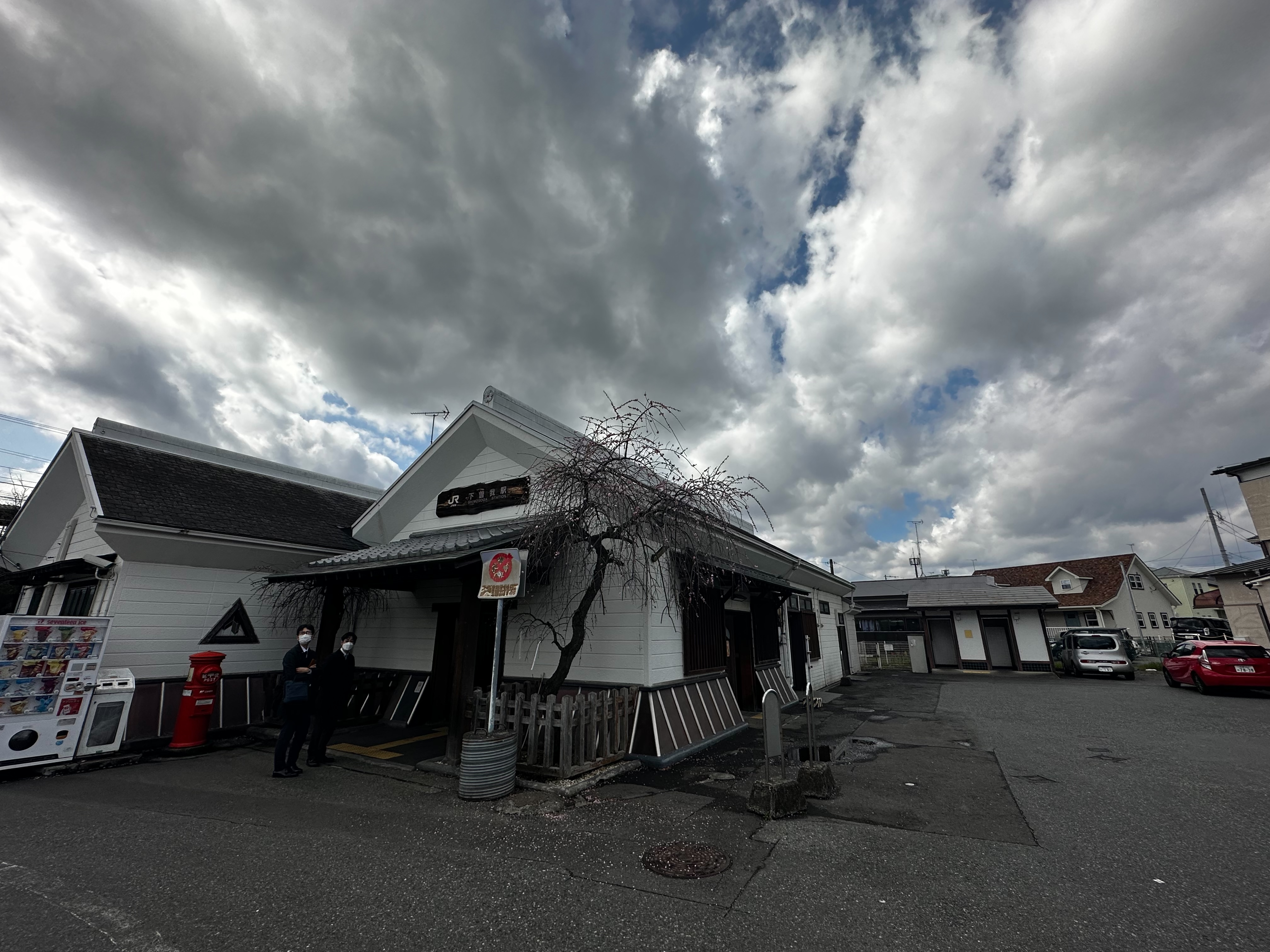
- Shimo-Soga Station, March 2023

General information
- Location: Sogabetsusho, Odawara City, Kanagawa Prefecture 250-0205; Japan
- Coordinates: 35°18′13″N 139°11′00″E
- Operator: JR Central
- Line: Gotemba Line
- Distance: 3.8 km (2.4 mi) from Kōzu
- Platforms: 1 island platform
- Tracks: 2
- Connections: Bus terminal

Construction
- Structure type: At grade

Other information
- Status: Staffed
- Station code: CB02
- Website: Official website

History
- Opened: 15 May 1922; 104 years ago

Passengers
- FY2019: 1,313 daily

Services
Preceding station	JR Central	Following station
Kami-Ōi CB02 towards Numazu	Gotemba Line	Kōzu CB00 Terminus
Location
- Location within Kanagawa Prefecture Location within Kanto Area Location within Japan

Shimo-Soga Station (下曽我駅, Shimo-Soga-eki) is a passenger railway station located in the northeastern part of the city of Odawara, Kanagawa, Japan, operated by Central Japan Railway Company (JR Central).

== Lines ==
Shimo-Soga Station is served by the Gotemba Line and is 3.8 kilometers from the terminus of the line at Kōzu Station.

== Station layout ==
Shimo-Soga station consists of a single ground-level island platform. The station is staffed.

== History ==
Shimo-Soga Station opened on May 15, 1922. The station building was destroyed by the 1923 Great Kanto earthquake. With the opening of the Tanna Tunnel in 1934, it became a station on the Gotemba line. On August 21, 1962, regular freight services were discontinued, but were resumed again on October 1, 1967. Since the privatization of the Japanese National Railways on April 1, 1987, the station has been for passengers only.

Station numbering was introduced to the Gotemba Line in March 2018; Shimo-Soga Station was assigned station number CB01.

== Passenger statistics ==
In fiscal 2018, the station was used by an average of 1313 passengers daily (boarding passengers only).

The passenger figures (boarding passengers only) for previous years are as shown below.

Fiscal year	daily average
2005	1,367
2010	1,328
2015	1,307

== Surrounding area ==
- Odawara City Hall Shimosoga Branch
- Shimosoga Post Office

== See also ==
- List of railway stations in Japan
