= Ashigarakami District =

District in Kanagawa prefecture, Japan

Coordinates: 35°24′14″N 139°04′26″E

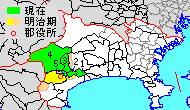
Map of Ashigarakami District with Meiji period area in yellow, modern area in green 1 - Nakai, 2 - Ōi, 3 - Matsuda, 4 - Yamakita, 5 - Kaisei

Ashigarakami District (足柄上郡, Ashigarakami-gun) is a district located in western Kanagawa Prefecture, Japan. Most of the mountainous district is sparsely populated, and is part of the Tanzawa-Ōyama Quasi-National Park. Parts of the cities of Hadano and Odawara, and the entire city of Minamiashigara were formerly part of Ashigarakami District.

As of 2009, the district had an estimated population of 67,954 and a density of 224 persons per km^{2}. The total area was 303.44 km^{2}.

== Towns and villages ==
- Kaisei
- Matsuda
- Nakai
- Ōi
- Yamakita

== History ==
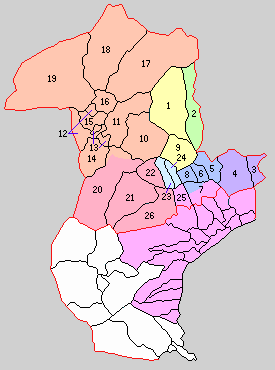
Historic Map of Ashigarakami District

Ashigarakami District was one of the ancient subdivisions of Sagami Province, per the Nara period Ritsuryō system, under the name as Ashinokami District (足上郡, Ashinokami-gun). The area was under control of the later Hōjō clan in the Sengoku period, and part of Odawara Domain during the Edo period. Following disasters caused by eruptions of nearby Mount Fuji, a portion also came to be held as tenryō territory administered by the Tokugawa shogunate.

=== Timeline ===
After the Meiji Restoration, it initially formed part of the short-lived Ashigara Prefecture, before was established as a district of Kanagawa Prefecture under the cadastral reform of 1878. In 1889, it was administratively divided into 26 villages.

On April 1, 1972, part of Ashigarakami District became the city of Minamiashigara.

=== Merger table ===
pre-1889	April 1, 1889	1889–1926		1926–1944		1945 - 1954	1955–1989			1989–Present
	Kamihadano village	Kamihadano village		Kamihadano village	Kamihadano village		July 28, 1955; Naka District, Nishihadano town	January 1, 1963 merged with Hadano city	Hadano city	Hadano
	Yamada village	Yamada village		Yamada village	November 3, 1946; Aiwa village	June 20, 1951 merged with Nishihadano village (Tochikubo area)	July 28, 1955; Naka District, Nishihadano town	January 1, 1963 merged with Hadano city	Hadano city	Hadano
	Kaminaka village	Kaminaka village		Kaminaka village	November 3, 1946; Aiwa village	Aiwa village	April 1, 1956; Ōi town		Ōi town	Ōi
	Kaneda village	Kaneda village		Kaneda village	Kaneda village		April 1, 1956; Ōi town		Ōi town	Ōi
	Soga village	Soga village		Soga village	Soga village		April 1, 1956; Ōi town (Nishiōi・Kamiōi areas)		Ōi town	Ōi
	Soga village	Soga village		Soga village	Soga village		April 1, 1956 merged with Odawara city (except Nishiōi, Kamiōi areas)		Odawara city	Odawara
	Sakurai village	Sakurai village		Sakurai village	December 18, 1950 merged with Odawara city		Odawara city		Odawara city	Odawara
	Naka village	April 1, 1908; Nakai village		Nakai village	Nakai village		December 1, 1963; Nakai town		Nakai town	Nakai
	Inokuchi village	April 1, 1908; Nakai village		Nakai village	Nakai village		December 1, 1963; Nakai town		Nakai town	Nakai
	Sakata village	Sakata village		Sakata village	Sakata village		February 1, 1955; Kaisei town		Kaisei town	Kaisei
	Yoshidajima village	Yoshidajima village		Yoshidajima village	Yoshidajima village		February 1, 1955; Kaisei town		Kaisei town	Kaisei
	Matsuda village	April 1, 1909; Matsuda town		Matsuda town	Matsuda town		Matsuda town		Matsuda town	Matsuda
	Yadoriki village	Yadoriki village		Yadoriki village	Yadoriki village		April 1, 1955 merged with Matsuda town		Matsuda town	Matsuda
	Minamiashigara village	Minamiashigara village		April 1, 1940; Minamiashigara town	Minamiashigaru town		April 1, 1955; Minamiashigara town	April 1, 1972; Minamiashigara city	Minamiashigara city	Minamiashigara
	Fukuzawa village	Fukuzawa village		Fukuzawa village	Fukuzawa village		April 1, 1955; Minamiashigara town	April 1, 1972; Minamiashigara city	Minamiashigara city	Minamiashigara
	Okamoto village	Okamoto village		Okamoto village	Okamoto village		April 1, 1955; Minamiashigara town	April 1, 1972; Minamiashigara city	Minamiashigara city	Minamiashigara
	Kitaashigara village	Kitaashigara village		Kitaashigara village	Kitaashigara village		April 1, 1955; Minamiashigara town (except Hirayama area)	April 1, 1972; Minamiashigara city	Minamiashigara city	Minamiashigara
	Kitaashigara village	Kitaashigara village		Kitaashigara village	Kitaashigara village		April 1, 1955 merged with Yamakita town (Hirayama area)		Yamakita town	Yamakita
	Kawa village	Kawa village		April 1, 1933; Yamakita town	Yamakita town		February 1, 1955; Yamakita town		Yamakita town	Yamakita
	Kyowa village	Kyōwa village		Kyōwa village	Kyōwa village		February 1, 1955; Yamakita town		Yamakita town	Yamakita
	Kawanishi village	April 1, 1911; Kawanishi village	April 1, 1923; Shimizu village	Shimizu village	Shimizu village		February 1, 1955; Yamakita town		Yamakita town	Yamakita
	Yubure village	April 1, 1911; Kawanishi village	April 1, 1923; Shimizu village	Shimizu village	Shimizu village		February 1, 1955; Yamakita town		Yamakita town	Yamakita
	Yaga village	Yaga village	April 1, 1923; Shimizu village	Shimizu village	Shimizu village		February 1, 1955; Yamakita town		Yamakita town	Yamakita
	Yamaichiba village	Yamaichiba village	April 1, 1923; Shimizu village	Shimizu village	Shimizu village		February 1, 1955; Yamakita town		Yamakita town	Yamakita
	Kaminawa village	Kaminawa village	February 1, 1925 merged with Shimizu village (Kaminawa area)	Shimizu village	Shimizu village		February 1, 1955; Yamakita town		Yamakita town	Yamakita
	Kaminawa village	Kaminawa village	February 1, 1925 merged with Miho village (Kamioda area)	Miho village	Miho village		February 1, 1955; Yamakita town		Yamakita town	Yamakita
	Nakakawa village	April 1, 1909; Miho village		Miho village	Miho village		February 1, 1955; Yamakita town		Yamakita town	Yamakita
	Kurokura village	April 1, 1909; Miho village		Miho village	Miho village		February 1, 1955; Yamakita town		Yamakita town	Yamakita
	Yozuku village	April 1, 1909; Miho village		Miho village	Miho village		February 1, 1955; Yamakita town		Yamakita town	Yamakita
