= Ōi, Kanagawa =

Ōi 大井町
- Town
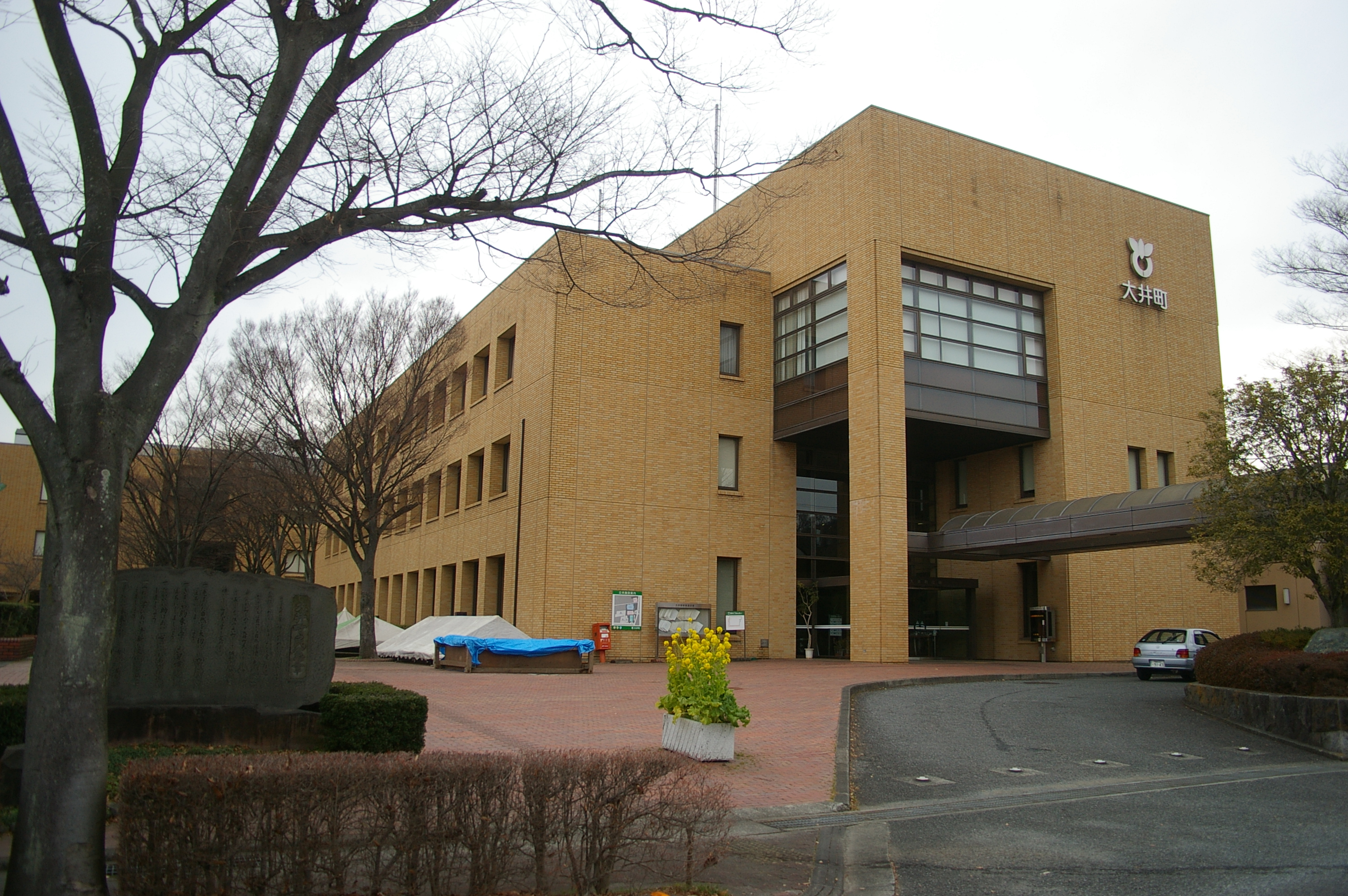
- Ōi Town Hall

- Flag Emblem

- Location of Ōi in Kanagawa Prefecture

- Coordinates: 35°20′N 139°09′E
- Country: Japan
- Region: Kantō
- Prefecture: Kanagawa
- District: Ashigarakami

Area
  - Total: 14.41 km^{2} (5.56 sq mi)

Population (April 30, 2021)
  - Total: 17,146
  - Density: 1,190/km^{2} (3,082/sq mi)
- Time zone: UTC+9 (Japan Standard Time)
- Symbols
  - Tree: Osmanthus fragrans
  - Flower: Narcissus
  - Bird: Japanese white-eye
- Phone number: 0465-83-1311
- Address: 1995 Kaneko, Ōi-machi, Ashigarakami-gun, Kanagawa-ken 258-8501
- Website: Official website

Ōi (大井町, Ōi-machi) is a town located in Kanagawa Prefecture, Japan. As of 1 October 2023, the town had an estimated population of 17,313 and a population density of 1201 persons per km^{2}. The total area of the town is 14.41 square kilometres (5.56 sq mi).

== Geography ==
Ōi is located in hilly southwestern Kanagawa Prefecture, bordering on the Tanzawa Mountains. The Sakawa River runs through the western end of the town. The Oiso Hills stretch from the northeastern and eastern part of the town, and the area from the center to the south of the town is flat. The Sakawa Weir (aqueduct), which is a diversion of the Sakawa River, flows through the central portion of the town to join the Kikugawa River that flows towards Odawara to the south. The flat lands are mostly paddy fields, and 10% of the town area and more than 30% of the cultivated land area are paddy fields. In addition, fruit trees such as mandarin oranges are also cultivated in the hills.

=== Surrounding municipalities ===
Kanagawa Prefecture

- Odawara
- Hadano
- Nakai, Matsuda, Kaisei

=== Climate ===
Ōi has a humid subtropical climate (Köppen Cfa) characterized by warm summers and cool winters with light to no snowfall.

== Demographics ==
Per Japanese census data, the population of Ōi has recently plateaued after a long period of growth.

Historical population
Year	Pop.	±%
1960	6,459	—
1970	8,876	+37.4%
1980	12,832	+44.6%
1990	14,895	+16.1%
2000	16,582	+11.3%
2010	17,972	+8.4%
2020	17,129	−4.7%

== History ==
During the Edo period, the area around present-day Ōi was part of Odawara Domain in Sagami Province. After the Meiji Restoration, it became part of Ashigarakami District in Kanagawa Prefecture. On April 1, 1889, the district of Ashigarakami was administratively divided into villages, including Kaminaka, Soga, Yamada and Kaneda with the establishment of the modern municipalities system. On November 3, 1943, the villages of Yamada and Kaminaka merged to form the village of Aiwa. Aiwa later lost a portion of its territory to neighboring Nishihadano on June 20, 1956. The remaining portion merged with Kaneda and portions of Soga to form Ōi on April 1, 1956.

== Government ==
Ōi has a mayor-council form of government with a directly elected mayor and a unicameral town council of 14 members. Ōi, together with the other municipalities in Ashigarakami District and Minamiashigara city, collectively contributes one member to the Kanagawa Prefectural Assembly. In terms of national politics, the town is part of Kanagawa 17th district of the lower house of the Diet of Japan.

== Economy ==
The economy of the Ōi is primarily agricultural.

== Education ==
Ōi has three public elementary schools and one public middle school operated by the town government. The town has one public high school operated by the Kanagawa Prefectural Board of Education.

== Transportation ==
=== Railway ===
JR Tokai – Gotemba Line

- Kami-Ōi - Sagami-Kaneko

=== Highway ===
- Tōmei Expressway (Ōi-Matsuda Interchange)
- National Route 255
