= Nakai, Kanagawa =

Nakai 中井町
- Town
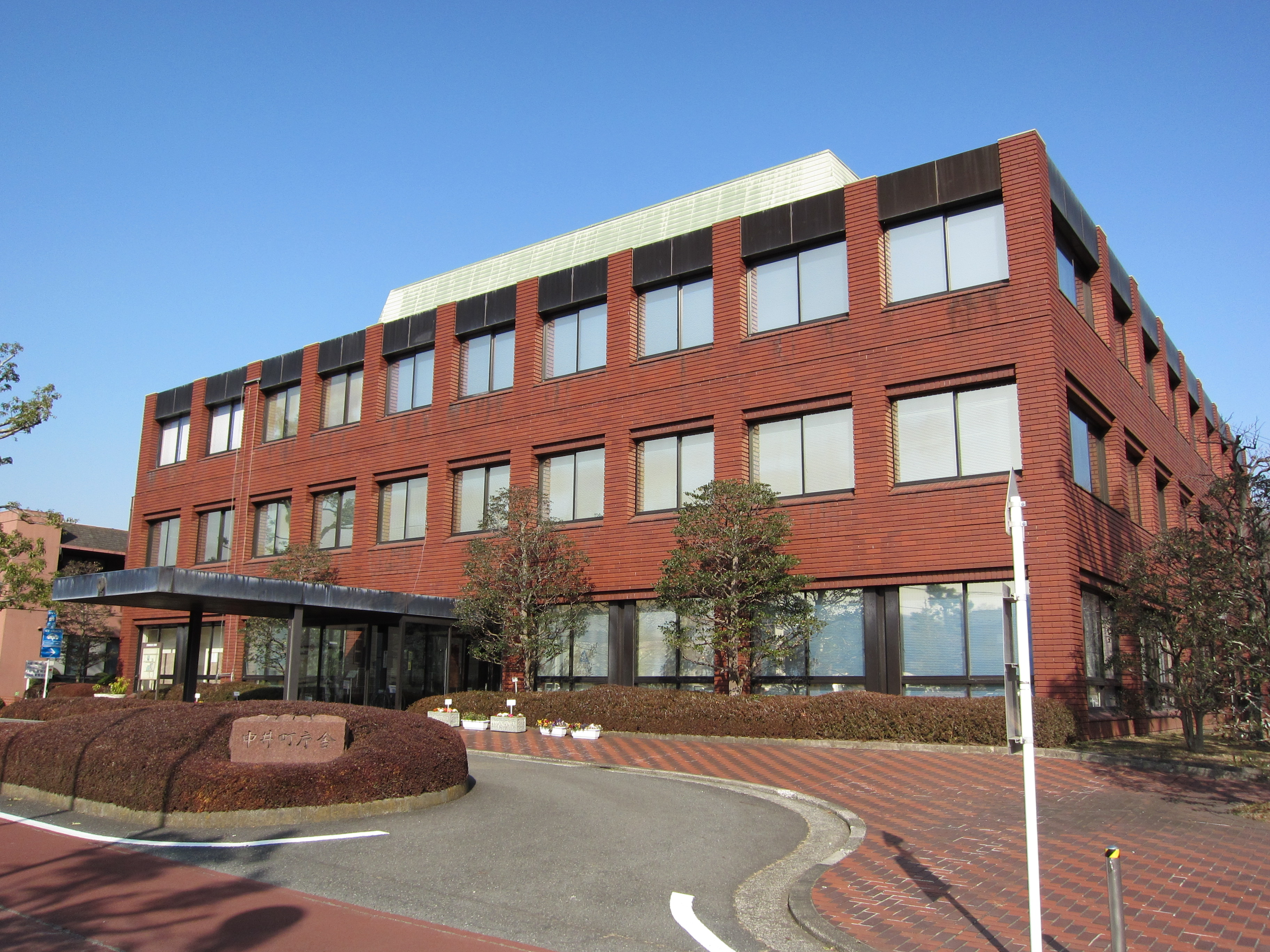
- Nakai Town Hall

- Flag Seal

- Location of Nakai in Kanagawa Prefecture

- Coordinates: 35°20′N 139°13′E
- Country: Japan
- Region: Kantō
- Prefecture: Kanagawa
- District: Ashigarakami

Area
  - Total: 20.02 km^{2} (7.73 sq mi)

Population (May 1, 2021)
  - Total: 9,155
  - Density: 457.3/km^{2} (1,184/sq mi)
- Time zone: UTC+9 (Japan Standard Time)
- Tree: Osmanthus fragrans
- Flower: Platycodon grandiflorus
- Bird: Egret
- Phone number: 0465-81-1111
- Address: 56 Asahikubo, Naki-machi, Ashigarakami-gun, Kanagawa-ken 259-0153
- Website: Official website

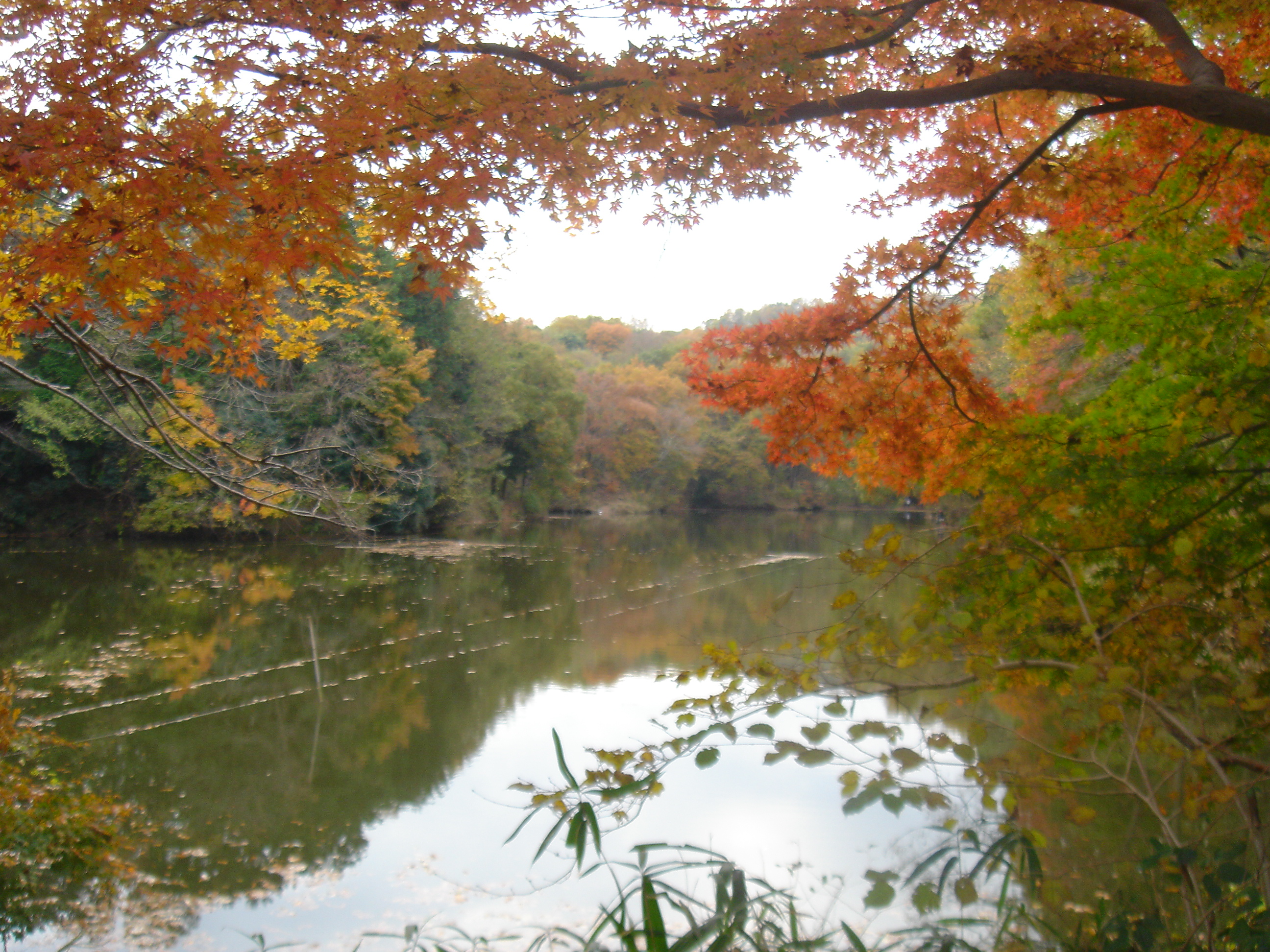
Lake Shinsei

Nakai (中井町, Nakai-machi) is a town located in Kanagawa Prefecture, Japan. As of 1 May 2021, the town had an estimated population of 9,155 and a population density of 460 persons per km^{2}. The total area of the town is 20.02 square kilometres (7.73 sq mi).

== Geography ==
Nakai is located in the southwestern part of Kanagawa prefecture, at the eastern end of Ashigarakami district. One-third of the town area in the northwestern part of the Oiso Hills is forest, all of which is privately owned, with agricultural land and the town located along the river between the hills. The Nakamura River runs through the town in the west and the Kuzugawa River runs through the town in the east. Due to the landslide caused by the 1923 Great Kanto Earthquake, the river in the north was blocked and Lake Shinsei. In the southwestern part of the town are hills of about 200 to 300 meters, and the slopes are dotted with mandarin orange fields.

=== Surrounding municipalities ===
Kanagawa Prefecture

- Hadano
- Hiratsuka
- Ninomiya
- Odawara
- Ōi

=== Climate ===
Nakai has a humid subtropical climate (Köppen Cfa) characterized by warm summers and cool winters with light to no snowfall. The average annual temperature in Nakai is 13.4 °C. The average annual rainfall is 2144 mm with September as the wettest month. The temperatures are highest on average in August, at around 24.2 °C, and lowest in January, at around 2.9 °C.

== Demographics ==
Per Japanese census data, the population of Nakai peaked around the year 2000 and has declined slightly since then.

Historical population
Year	Pop.	±%
1920	5,321	—
1930	5,258	−1.2%
1940	5,360	+1.9%
1950	6,361	+18.7%
1960	5,808	−8.7%
1970	6,028	+3.8%
1980	8,626	+43.1%
1990	10,054	+16.6%
2000	10,222	+1.7%
2010	10,010	−2.1%
2020	9,300	−7.1%

== History ==
During the Edo period, the area around present-day Nakai was part of Odawara Domain in Sagami Province. After the Meiji Restoration, it became part of Ashigarakami District in Kanagawa Prefecture. Nakai village was formed on April 1, 1889, with the establishment of the modern municipalities system. It merged with neighboring Iguchi village on April 1, 1908. The village was elevated to town status on December 1, 1958.

== Government ==
Nakai has a mayor-council form of government with a directly elected mayor and a unicameral town council of 13 members. Nakai, together with the other municipalities in Ashigarakami District and Minamiashigara city, collectively contributes one member to the Kanagawa Prefectural Assembly. In terms of national politics, the town is part of Kanagawa 17th district of the lower house of the Diet of Japan.

== Economy ==
The town economy is primarily agricultural, with dairy farming, mandarin oranges predominating. An industrial zone established near the Tōmei Expressway has attracted a number of industries, including Fuji Xerox, Terumo and Nippon Express.

== Education ==
Nakai has three public elementary schools operated by the town government. The town does not have any public middle school or high school.

== Transportation ==
Nakai has no train service, and is not on a national highway, although the Tōmei Expressway bisects the town. Nakai can be reached by Kanagawa Prefectural Route 71 or 77.

== Notable people from Nakai ==
- Hiroko Sato, singer, actress
- Bassui Tokushō, Muromachi period Zen priest
