= Matsuda, Kanagawa =

Matsuda 松田町
- Town
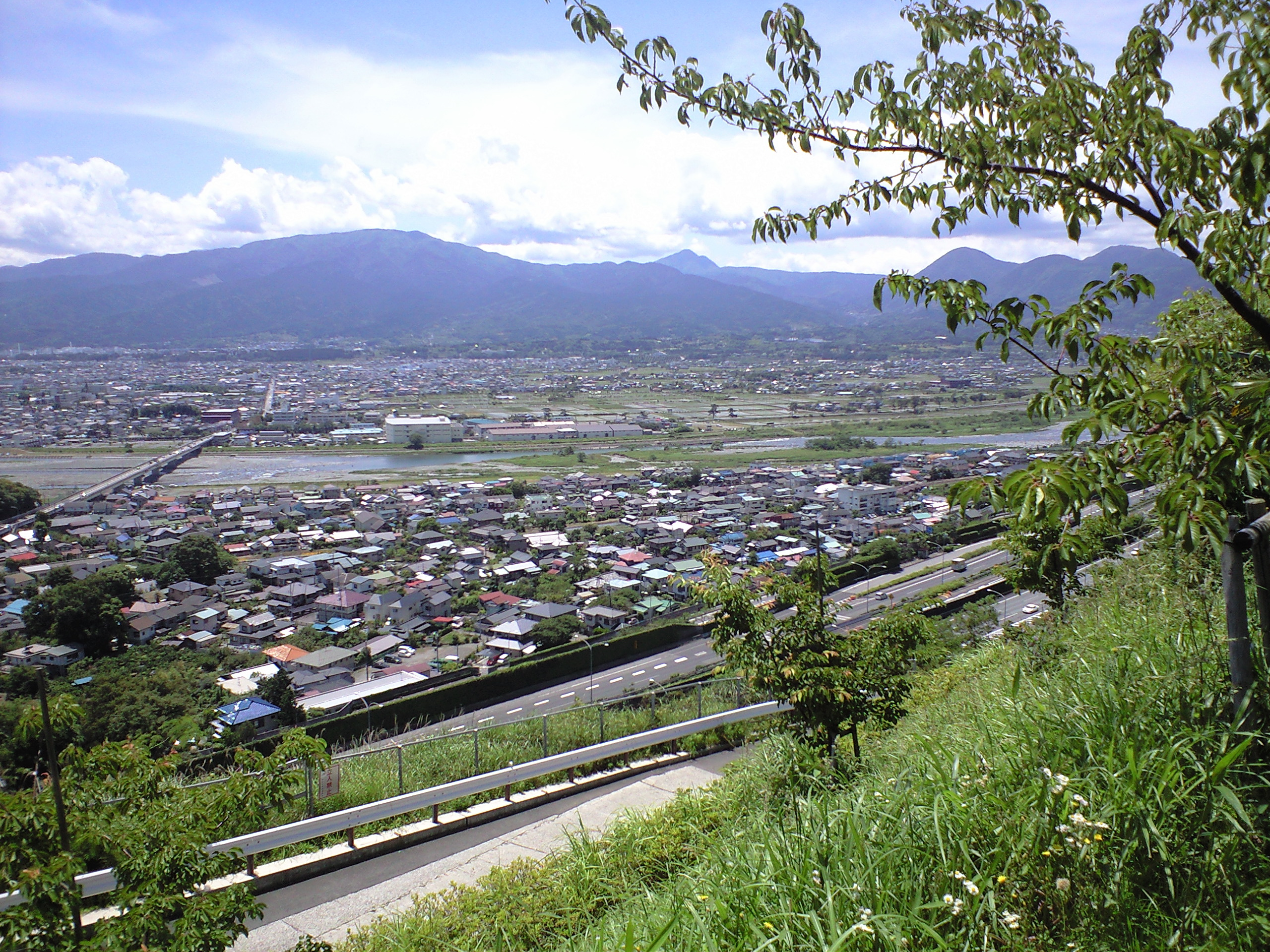
- Overview of Matsuda Town

- Flag Seal

- Location of Matsuda in Kanagawa Prefecture

- Coordinates: 35°21′N 139°8′E
- Country: Japan
- Region: Kantō
- Prefecture: Kanagawa
- District: Ashigarakami

Area
  - Total: 37.75 km^{2} (14.58 sq mi)

Population (May 1, 2021)
  - Total: 10,514
  - Density: 278.5/km^{2} (721.4/sq mi)
- Time zone: UTC+9 (Japan Standard Time)
- Symbols
  - Tree: Nandina
  - Flower: Cosmos
  - Bird: Japanese wagtail
- Phone number: 0465-83-1221
- Address: 2037 Shoryo, Matsuda-machi, Ashigarakami-gun, Kanagawa-ken 258-8585
- Website: Official website

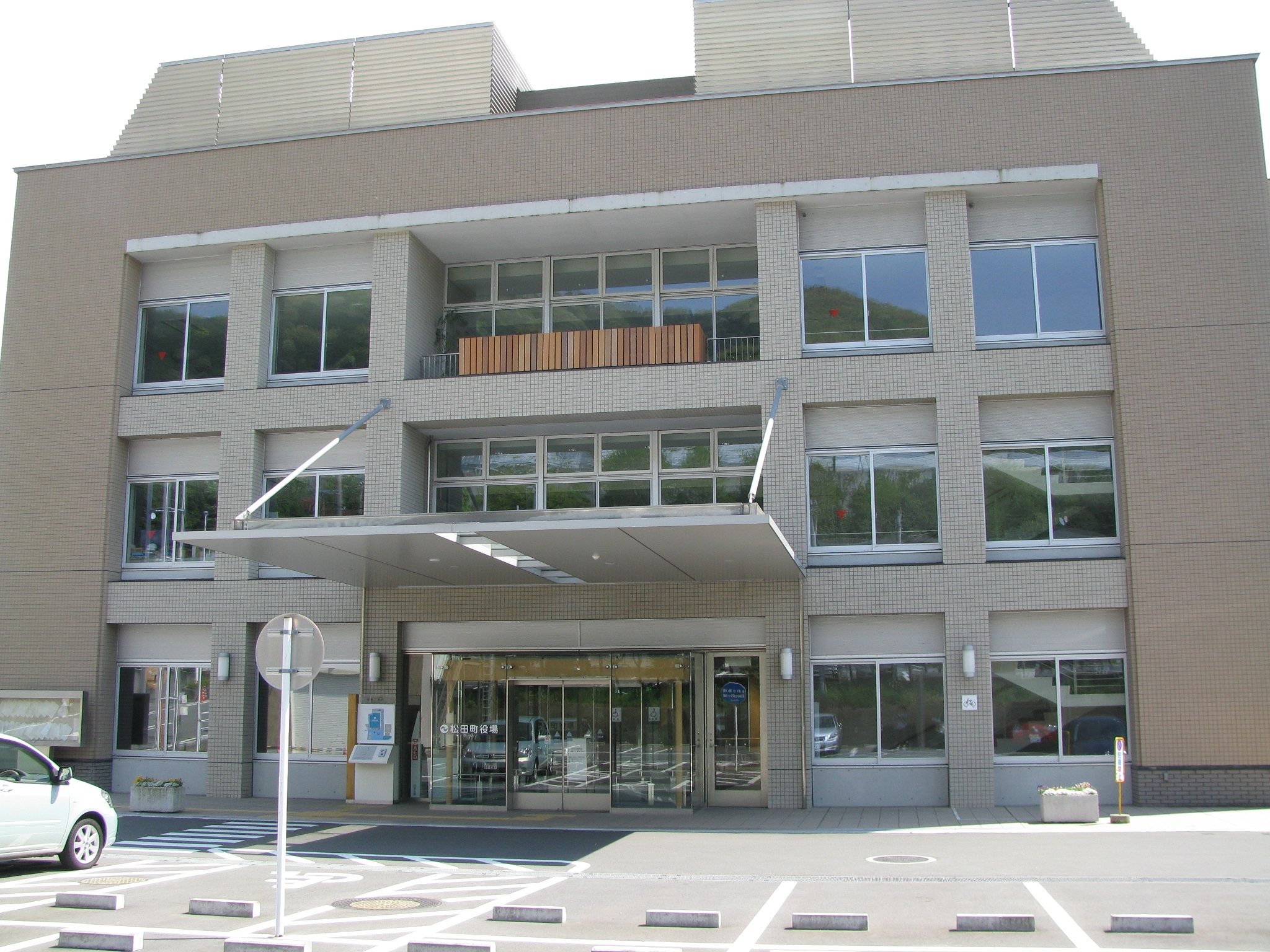
Matsuda Town Hall

Matsuda (松田町, Matsuda-machi) is a town located in Kanagawa Prefecture, Japan. As of 1 October 2023, the town had an estimated population of 8,971 and a population density of 237,6 persons per km^{2}. The total area of the town is 37.75 square kilometres (14.58 sq mi).

== Geography ==
Matsuda is located in hilly western Kanagawa Prefecture. The Sakawa River, Kawaoto River, Nakatsu River and their tributaries form the outline of the town. In the north, the 1,200m-class high peaks of the Nishi-Tanzawa Mountains, with parts of the town within the borders of the Tanzawa-Ōyama Quasi-National Park.

=== Surrounding municipalities ===
Kanagawa Prefecture

- Hadano
- Kaisei
- Minamiashigara
- Ōi
- Yamakita

=== Climate ===
Matsuda has a humid subtropical climate (Köppen Cfa) characterized by warm summers and cool winters with light to no snowfall. The average annual temperature in Matsuda is 12.5 °C. The average annual rainfall is 2144 mm with September as the wettest month. The temperatures are highest on average in August, at around 23.5 °C, and lowest in January, at around 1.6 °C.

== Demographics ==
Per Japanese census data, the population of Matsuda peaked around the year 1990 and has declined since.

Historical population
Year	Pop.	±%
1920	5,483	—
1930	7,200	+31.3%
1940	7,809	+8.5%
1950	10,041	+28.6%
1960	10,389	+3.5%
1970	11,875	+14.3%
1980	12,601	+6.1%
1990	13,097	+3.9%
2000	12,987	−0.8%
2010	11,676	−10.1%
2020	10,836	−7.2%

== History ==
During the Edo period area around present-day Matsuda was part of Odawara Domain in Sagami Province. After the Meiji Restoration, it became part of Ashigarakami District in Kanagawa Prefecture. On April 1, 1889, Ashikagakami District was administratively divided into several villages, including the villages of Yadoriki and Matsuda, with the establishment of the modern municipalities system. The growth of Matsuda was favored by the opening of Matsuda Station the same year, and it attained town status on April 1, 1909. Shin-Matsuda Station opened in 1927. On April 1, 1955, Yadoriki merged into Matsuda. A new town charter was promulgated in 1989, leading to the "Matsuda Plan 21" in the year 2001.

== Government ==
Matsuda has a mayor-council form of government with a directly elected mayor and a unicameral town council of 12 members. Matsuda, together with the other municipalities in Ashigarakami District and Minamiashigara city, collectively contributes one member to the Kanagawa Prefectural Assembly. In terms of national politics, the town is part of Kanagawa 17th district of the lower house of the Diet of Japan.

== Education ==
Matsuda has two public elementary schools and two public middle schools operated by the town government. The town does not have any public high school, but there is one private high school.

== Transportation ==
=== Rail ===
JR Tokai – Gotemba Line

- Matsuda

Odakyū Odawara Line

- Shin-Matsuda

=== Highway ===
- Tōmei Expressway (Ōi-Matsuda Interchange)
- Shin-Tōmei Expressway
- National Route 246
- National Route 255

== Local attractions ==
Some local attractions include Sakawa River fishing, Tanzawa Mountain Range hiking, paragliding and camping, and blueberry, tangerine and sweet potato harvesting. Other attractions include the local matsuri, the Matsudayama Herb Garden, Children's Museum, Nature Hall, the ridable miniature railway, the Yadoriki Petting Zoo & Dog Park, Yadoriki Fishing Area, two golf courses, and the Matsuda Health & Welfare Center onsen.

=== Events ===
- Matsuda Sakura Festival (late February)
- Wakaba Festival (May 5)
- Herb Festival (June and October)
- Yadoriki Hotaru (Firefly) Festival (June)
- Matsuda Tourism Festival (August)
- Emmei Temple Festival (December 28)

== Sister cities ==
- Yokoshibahikari, Chiba, Japan, since November 3, 2003
