= Kaisei, Kanagawa =

Kaisei 開成町
- Town
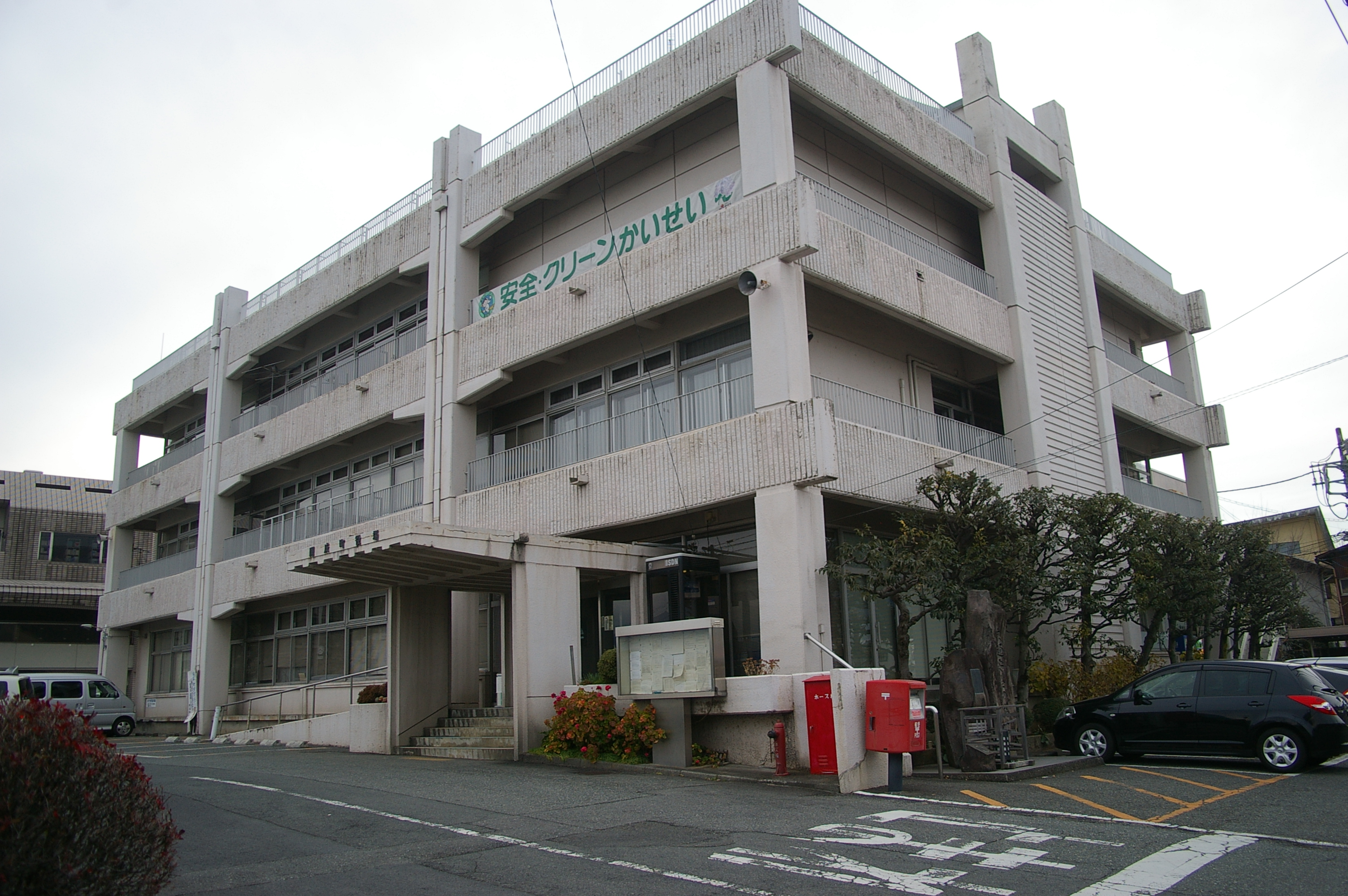
- Kaisei Town Hall

- Flag Seal

- Location of Kaisei in Kanagawa Prefecture

- Coordinates: 35°20′N 139°08′E
- Country: Japan
- Region: Kantō
- Prefecture: Kanagawa
- District: Ashigarakami

Area
  - Total: 6.56 km^{2} (2.53 sq mi)

Population (April 1, 2021)
  - Total: 18,335
  - Density: 2,790/km^{2} (7,240/sq mi)
- Time zone: UTC+9 (Japan Standard Time)
- Tree: Castanopsis
- Flower: Hydrangea
- Phone number: 0465-83-2331
- Address: 773 Ezawa, Kaisei-machi, Ashigarakami-gun, Kanagawa-ken 258-8502
- Website: Official website

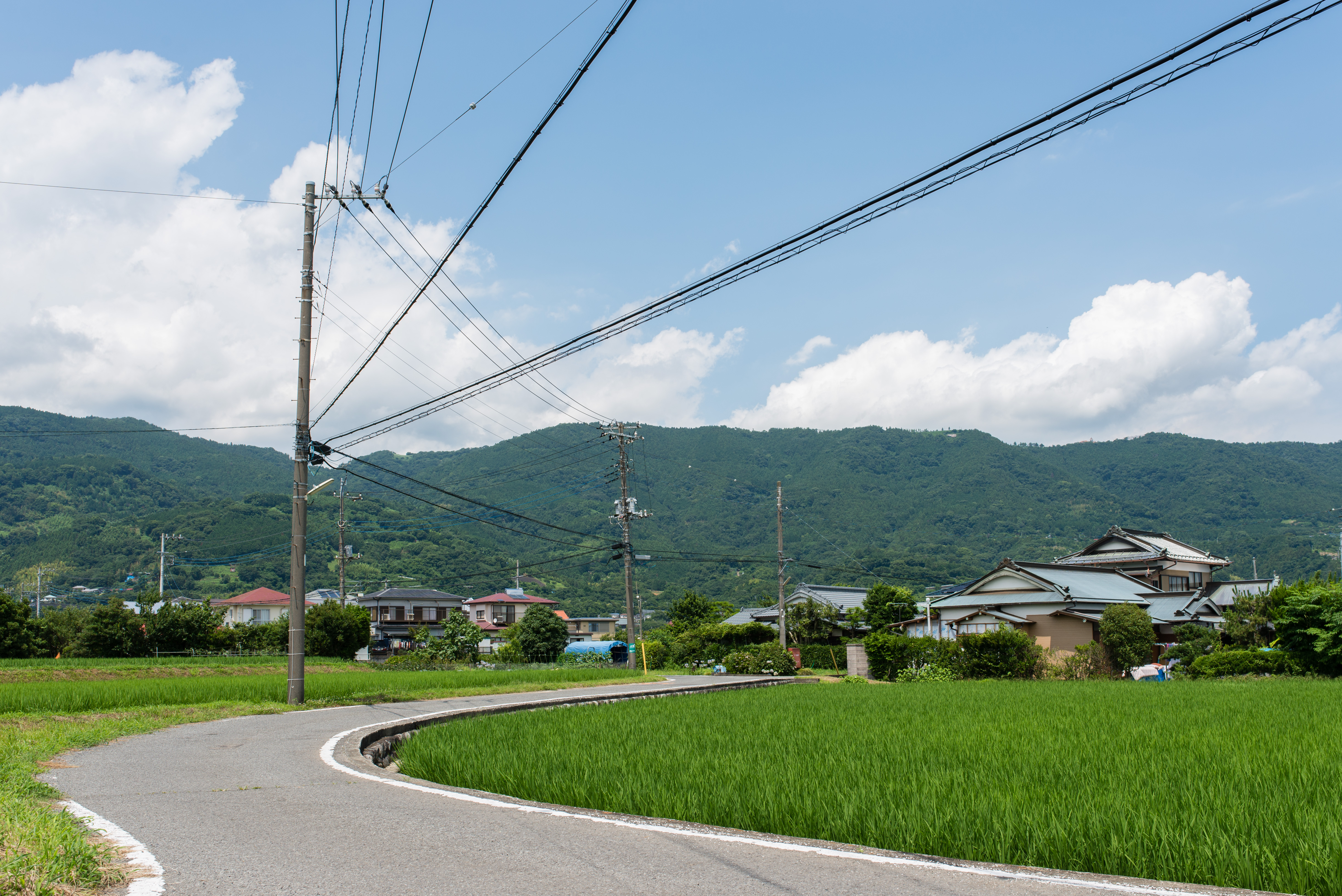
rural scene in Kaisei

Kaisei (開成町, Kaisei-machi) is a town located in Kanagawa Prefecture, Japan. As of 1 April 2021, the town had an estimated population of 18,335 and a population density of 2800 persons per km^{2}. The total area of the town is 6.56 square kilometres (2.53 sq mi). It is the smallest municipality in Kanagawa Prefecture in terms of area.

== Geography ==
Kaisei is located on the eastern bank of the Sakawa River, in western Kanagawa Prefecture.

=== Surrounding municipalities ===
Kanagawa Prefecture

- Matsuda
- Minamiashigara
- Odawara
- Ōi
- Yamakita

=== Climate ===
Kaisei has a humid subtropical climate (Köppen Cfa) characterized by warm summers and cool winters with light to no snowfall. The average annual temperature in Kaisei is 13.6 °C. The average annual rainfall is 2221 mm with September as the wettest month. The temperatures are highest on average in August, at around 24.4 °C, and lowest in January, at around 3.2 °C.

== Demographics ==
Per Japanese census data, the population of Kaisei has grown steadily since the 1970s.

Historical population
Year	Pop.	±%
1920	3,504	—
1930	3,746	+6.9%
1940	3,911	+4.4%
1950	4,681	+19.7%
1960	4,781	+2.1%
1970	8,205	+71.6%
1980	10,673	+30.1%
1990	11,941	+11.9%
2000	13,396	+12.2%
2010	16,369	+22.2%
2020	18,329	+12.0%

== History ==
The area of modern Kaisei was part of Odawara Domain in Sagami Province during the Edo period. After the Meiji Restoration, the area became part of Ashigarakami District in Kanagawa Prefecture and was divided into several villages with the establishment of the modern municipalities system on April 1, 1889. The town of Kaisei was founded on February 2, 1955, through the merger of Sakata village and Yoshidajima village. It was connected by train on March 14, 1985.

== Government ==
Kaisei has a mayor-council form of government with a directly elected mayor and a unicameral town council of 12 members. Kaisei, together with the other municipalities in Ashigarakami District and Minamiashigara city, collectively contributes one member to the Kanagawa Prefectural Assembly. In terms of national politics, the town is part of Kanagawa 17th district of the lower house of the Diet of Japan.

== Economy ==
The economy of Kaisei is based primarily on agriculture and forestry. The main industry is a factory owned by Fujifilm.

== Education ==
Kaisei has two public elementary schools and one public middle school operated by the town government. The town has one public high school operated by the Kanagawa Prefectural Board of Education.

== Transportation ==
=== Railroad ===
Odakyū Odawara Line

- Kaisei

=== Highway ===
- Kanagawa Prefectural Routes 78, 712, 720
