= Sakawa River =

Sakawa River Ayuzawa River
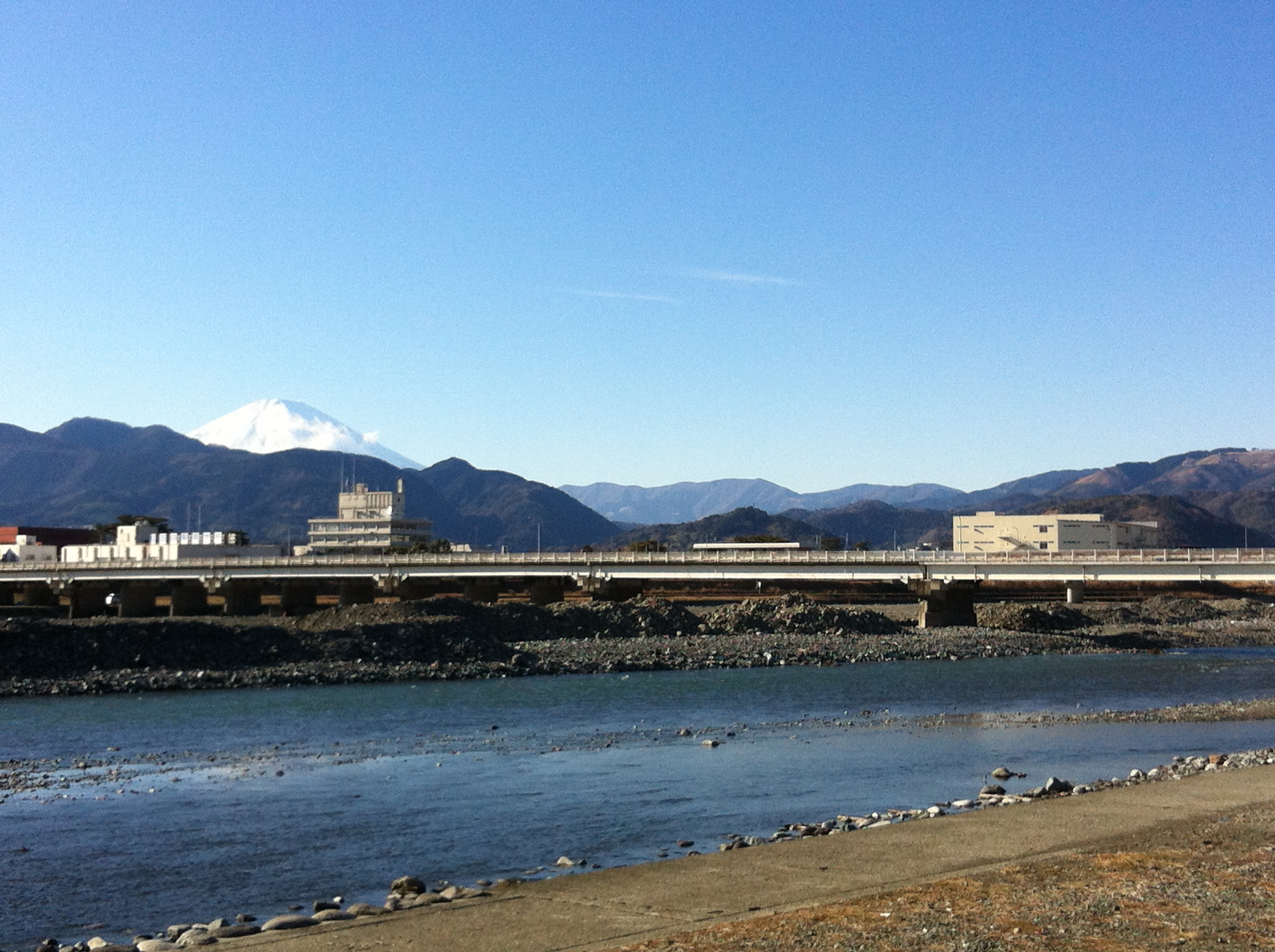
- Sakawa River in 2017

- Location within Japan
- Native name: 酒匂川 (Japanese)

Location
- Country: Japan
- State: Honshu
- Region: Shizuoka, Kanagawa

Physical characteristics
- Source: Gotemba, Shizuoka
- Mouth: Sagami Bay
  - location: Odawara
  - coordinates: 35°15′39″N 139°11′02″E
- Length: 46 km (29 mi)
- Basin size: 582 km^{2} (225 sq mi)

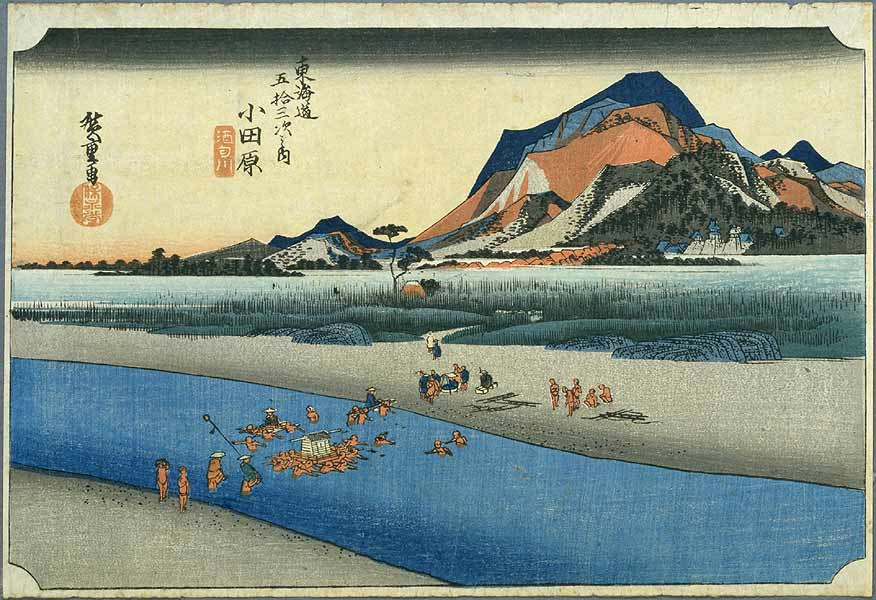
Hiroshige

The Sakawa River (Japanese: 酒匂川(さかわがわ), Hepburn: sakawagawa) is a river in Shizuoka Prefecture and Kanagawa Prefecture Japan. In Shizuoka Prefecture it is called the Ayuzawa River. It flows into the Pacific Ocean.
