= List of waterfalls in Japan =

One Hundred Waterfalls of Japan (日本の滝百選, Nihon no taki hyakusen) is a list of waterfalls in Japan compiled by the Japanese Ministry of the Environment in 1990.

== Background ==
According to the Japanese government, there are 517 named waterfalls in Japan. Many of these waterfalls are located in remote mountain locations, but with an increase in hiking and tourism in recent years, the number of visitors has greatly increased, placing significant pressure on the surrounding environment.

== Listing ==
One hundred waterfalls of Japan
#	Name	Location	Prefecture	City, town or village	References
1	Hagoromo Falls (羽衣の滝, Hagoromo-no-taki)	43°37′38.3″N 142°47′12.5″E	Hokkaidō	Higashikawa	
2	Inkura Falls (インクラの滝, Inkura-no-taki)		Hokkaidō	Shiraoi	
3	Garō Falls ("飛竜"賀老の滝, "Hiryū" Garō-no-taki)		Hokkaidō	Shimamaki	
4	Ryūsei-Ginga Falls (流星・銀河の滝, Ryūsei-Ginga-no-taki)		Hokkaidō	Kamikawa	
5	Ashiribetsu Falls (アシリベツの滝, Ashiribetsu-no-taki)		Hokkaidō	Minami-ku, Sapporo	
6	Oshinkoshin Falls (オシンコシンの滝, Oshinkoshin-no-taki)		Hokkaidō	Shari	
7	Kurokuma Falls (くろくまの滝, Kurokuma-no-taki)		Aomori Prefecture	Ajigasawa	
8	Matsumi Falls (松見の滝, Matsumi-no-taki)		Aomori Prefecture	Towada	
9	Fudō Falls (不動の滝, Fudō-no-taki)		Iwate Prefecture	Hachimantai	
10	Akiu Great Falls (秋保大滝, Akiu-Ōtaki)		Miyagi Prefecture	Taihaku-ku, Sendai	
11	Sankai Falls (三階の滝, Sankai-no-taki)		Miyagi Prefecture	Zao	
12	Nanataki Falls (七滝, Nanataki)		Akita Prefecture	Kosaka	
13	Chagama Falls (茶釜の滝, Chagama-no-taki)		Akita Prefecture	Kazuno	
14	Hottai Falls (法体の滝, Hottai-no-taki)		Akita Prefecture	Yurihonjō	
15	Yasu Falls (安の滝, Yasu-no-taki)		Akita Prefecture	Kitaakita	
16	Namekawa Great Falls (滑川の大滝, Namekawa-no-Ōtaki)		Yamagata Prefecture	Yonezawa	
17	Shiraito Falls (白糸の滝, Shiraito-no-taki)	38°45′56″N 140°3′22″E	Yamagata Prefecture	Tozawa	
18	Nanatsu Falls (七ツ滝, Nanatsu-taki)		Yamagata Prefecture	Tsuruoka	
19	Otsuji Falls (乙字ケ滝, Otsuji-ga-taki)		Fukushima Prefecture	Sukagawa	
20	Sanjō Falls (三条の滝, Sanjō-no-taki)		Fukushima Prefecture	Hinoemata	
21	Chōshi Falls (銚子ケ滝, Chōshi-ga-taki)		Fukushima Prefecture	Kōriyama	
22	Fukuroda Falls (袋田の滝, Fukuroda-no-taki)		Ibaraki Prefecture	Daigo	
23	Kegon Falls (華厳滝, Kegon-no-taki)		Tochigi Prefecture	Nikko	
24	Kirifuri Falls (霧降の滝, Kirifuri-no-taki)		Tochigi Prefecture	Nikko	
25	Fukiware Falls (吹割の滝, Fukiware-no-taki)		Gunma Prefecture	Namata	
26	Jōfu Falls (常布の滝, Jōfu-no-taki)		Gunma Prefecture	Kusatsu	
27	Tanashita no Fudō Falls (棚下の不動滝, Tanashita-no-Fudō-no-taki)		Gunma Prefecture	Shibukawa	
28	Marugami Falls (丸神の滝, Marugami-no-taki)		Saitama Prefecture	Ogano	
29	Hossawa Falls (払沢の滝, Hossawa-no-taki)		Tokyo	Hinohara	
30	Hayato Great Falls (早戸大滝, Hayato Ōtaki)		Kanagawa Prefecture	Sagamihara	
31	Shasui Falls (洒水の滝, Shasui-no-taki)		Kanagawa Prefecture	Yamakita	
32	Nanatsugamagodan Falls (七ツ釜五段の滝, Nanatsugamagodan-no-taki)		Yamanashi Prefecture	Yamanashi	
33	Kitashōji Falls (北精進ケ滝, Kitashōji-ga-taki)		Yamanashi Prefecture	Hokuto	
34	Senga Falls (仙娥滝, Senga-taki)		Yamanashi Prefecture	Kōfu	
35	Suzu Falls (鈴ヶ滝, Suzu-ka-taki)		Niigata Prefecture	Murakami	
36	Naena Falls (苗名滝, Naena-taki)		Niigata Prefecture	Myōkō	
37	Sōtaki Falls (惣滝, Sō-taki)		Niigata Prefecture	Myōkō	
38	Shōmyō Falls (称名滝, Shōmyō-daki)		Toyama Prefecture	Tateyama	
39	Uba Falls (姥ケ滝, Uba-ga-taki)		Ishikawa Prefecture	Hakusan	
40	Ryūsō Falls (龍双ケ滝, Ryūsō-ga-taki)		Fukui Prefecture	Ikeda	
41	Yonako Daibakufu Falls (米子大瀑布, Yonako-daibakufu)		Nagano Prefecture	Suzaka	
42	Sanbon Falls (三本滝, Sanbon-daki)		Nagano Prefecture	Matsumoto	
43	Tadachi Falls (田立の滝, Tadachi-no-taki)		Nagano Prefecture	Nagiso	
44	Neo Falls (根尾の滝, Neo-no-taki)		Gifu Prefecture	Gero	
45	Hirayu Great Falls (平湯大滝, Hirayu Ōtaki)		Gifu Prefecture	Takayama	
46	Yōrō Falls (養老の滝, Yōrō-no-taki)		Gifu Prefecture	Yōrō	
47	Amida Falls (阿弥陀ケ滝, Amida-ga-taki)		Gifu Prefecture	Gujō	
48	Abe Great Falls (安倍の大滝, Abe no Ōtaki)		Shizuoka Prefecture	Aoi-ku, Shizuoka	
49	Jōren Falls (浄蓮の滝, Jōren-no-taki)		Shizuoka Prefecture	Itō	
50	Shiraito Falls (白糸の滝, Shiraito-no-taki)+Otodome Falls (音止めの滝, Otodome-no-taki)		Shizuoka Prefecture	Fujinomiya	
51	Atera Seven Falls (阿寺の七滝, Atera-no-Nana-taki)		Aichi Prefecture	Shinshiro	
52	Nunobiki Falls (布引の滝, Nunobi-no-taki)		Mie Prefecture	Kumano	
53	Akame Shijyūhachi Falls (赤目四十八滝, Akame Shijyūhachi-taki)		Mie Prefecture	Nabari	
54	Nanatsugama Falls (七ツ釜滝, Nanatsugama-taki)		Mie Prefecture	Ōdai	
55	Yatsubuchi Falls (八ツ淵の滝, Yatsubuchi-no-taki)		Shiga Prefecture	Takashima	
56	Kanabiki Falls (金引の滝, Kanabiki-no-taki)		Kyoto Prefecture	Miyazu	
57	Minoo Falls (箕面滝, Minoo-no-taki)		Osaka Prefecture	Minoh	
58	Harafudō Falls (原不動滝, Harafudō-taki)		Hyōgo Prefecture	Hyōgo	
59	Saruo Falls (猿尾滝, Saruo-daki)		Hyōgo Prefecture	Kami	
60	Tendaki Falls (天滝, Tendaki)		Hyōgo Prefecture	Yabu	
61	Nunobiki Falls (布引の滝, Nunobiki-no-taki)		Hyōgo Prefecture	Kobe	
62	Somon Falls (双門の滝, Somon-no-taki)		Nara Prefecture	Tenkawa	
63	Fudōnanae Falls (不動七重滝, Fudōnanae-no-taki)		Nara Prefecture	Shimokitayama	
64	Sasa Falls (笹の滝, Sasa-no-taki)		Nara Prefecture	Totsukawa	
65	Naka Falls (中の滝, Naka-no-taki)		Nara Prefecture	Kamikitayama	
66	Nachi Falls (那智滝, Nachi-no-taki)		Wakayama Prefecture	Nachikatsuura	
67	Kuwanoki Falls (桑ノ木の滝, Kuwanoki-no-taki)		Wakayama Prefecture	Shingū	
68	Haso Falls (八草の滝, Haso-no-taki)		Wakayama Prefecture	Shirahama	
69	Daisen Falls (大山滝, Daisen-taki)		Tottori Prefecture	Tōhaku	
70	Ame Falls (雨滝, Amedaki)		Tottori Prefecture	Tottori	
71	Dangyō Falls (壇鏡の滝, Dangyō-no-taki)		Shimane Prefecture	Okinoshima	
72	Ryūzuyae Falls (龍頭八重滝, Ryūzuyae-daki)		Shimane Prefecture	Unnan	
73	Kanba Falls (神庭の滝, Kanba-no-taki)		Okayama Prefecture	Maniwa	
74	Jōsei Falls (常清滝, Jōsei-daki)		Hiroshima Prefecture	Miyoshi	
75	Jakuchikyō Goryū Falls (寂地峡五竜の滝, Jakuchikyō Goryū-no-taki)		Yamaguchi Prefecture	Iwakuni	
76	Ōgama Falls (大釜の滝, Ōgama-no-taki)		Tokushima Prefecture	Naka	
77	Todoroki Kujyūku Falls (轟九十九滝, Todoroki kujyūku-taki)		Tokushima Prefecture	Kaiyō	
78	Amagoi Falls (雨乞の滝, Amagoi-no-taki)		Tokushima Prefecture	Kamiyama	
79	Yukiwa Falls (雪輪の滝, Yukiwa-no-taki)		Ehime Prefecture	Uwajima	
80	Goraikō Falls (御来光の滝, Goraikō-no-taki)		Ehime Prefecture	Kumakōgen	
81	Ryūō Falls (龍王の滝, Ryūō-no-taki)		Kōchi Prefecture	Ōtoyo	
82	Todoro Falls (轟の滝, Todoro-no-taki)		Kōchi Prefecture	Kami	
83	Ōtaru Falls (大樽の滝, Ōtaru-no-taki)		Kōchi Prefecture	Ochi	
84	Kannon Falls (観音の滝, Kannon-no-taki)		Saga Prefecture	Karatsu	
85	Mikaeri Falls (見帰りの滝, Mikaeri-no-taki)		Saga Prefecture	Karatsu	
86	Yonjyūsanman Falls (四十三万滝, Yonjyūsanman-taki)		Kumamoto Prefecture	Kikuchi	
87	Sendantodoro Falls (栴壇轟の滝, Sendantodoro-no-taki)		Kumamoto Prefecture	Yatsushiro	
88	Sugaruga Falls (数鹿流ヶ滝, Sugaruga-taki)		Kumamoto Prefecture	Minamiaso	
89	Kaname Falls (鹿目の滝, Kaname-no-taki)		Kumamoto Prefecture	Hitoyoshi	
90	Higashishiiya Falls (東椎屋の滝, Higashishiiya-no-taki)		Ōita Prefecture	Usa	
91	Harajiri Falls (原尻の滝, Harajiri-no-taki)		Ōita Prefecture	Bungo-ōno	
92	Shindō Falls (震動の滝, Shindō-no-taki)		Ōita Prefecture	Kokonoe	
93	Nishishiiya Falls (西椎屋の滝, Nishishiiya-no-taki)		Ōita Prefecture	Kusu	
94	Sekinoo Falls (関之尾滝, Sekinoo-no-taki)		Miyazaki Prefecture	Miyakonojō	
95	Yatogi Falls (矢研の滝, Yatogi-no-taki)		Miyazaki Prefecture	Tsuno	
96	Mukabaki Falls (むかばきの滝, Mukabaki-no-taki)		Miyazaki Prefecture	Nobeoka	
97	Manai Falls (真名井の滝, Manai-no-taki)		Miyazaki Prefecture	Takachiho	
98	Ryūmon Falls (龍門滝, Ryūmon-daki)		Kagoshima Prefecture	Kajiki	
99	Ōko Falls (大川の滝, Ōko-no-taki)		Kagoshima Prefecture	Yakushima	
100	Mariyudu Falls (マリユドゥの滝, Mariyudu-no-taki)		Okinawa Prefecture	Taketomi	

== Gallery ==
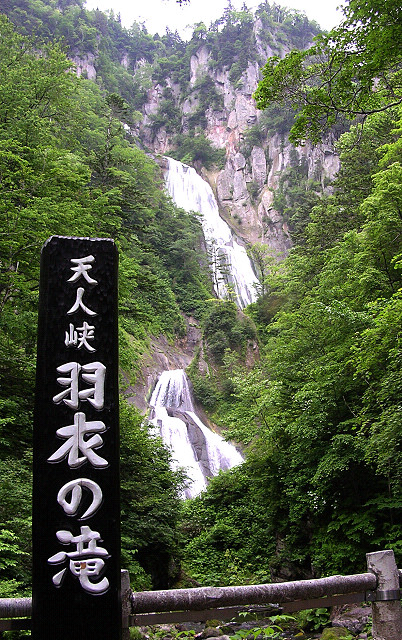
1. Hagoromo Falls

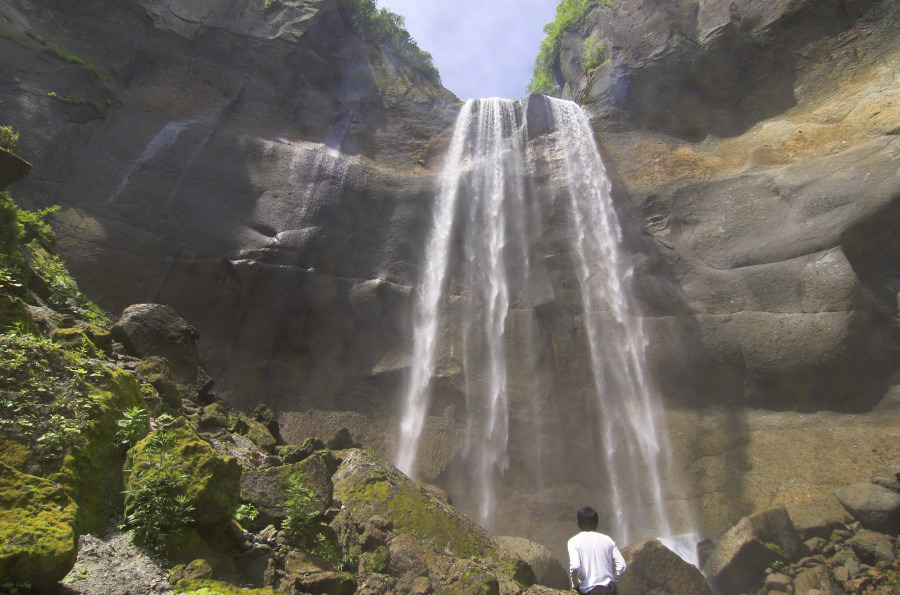
2. Inkura Falls

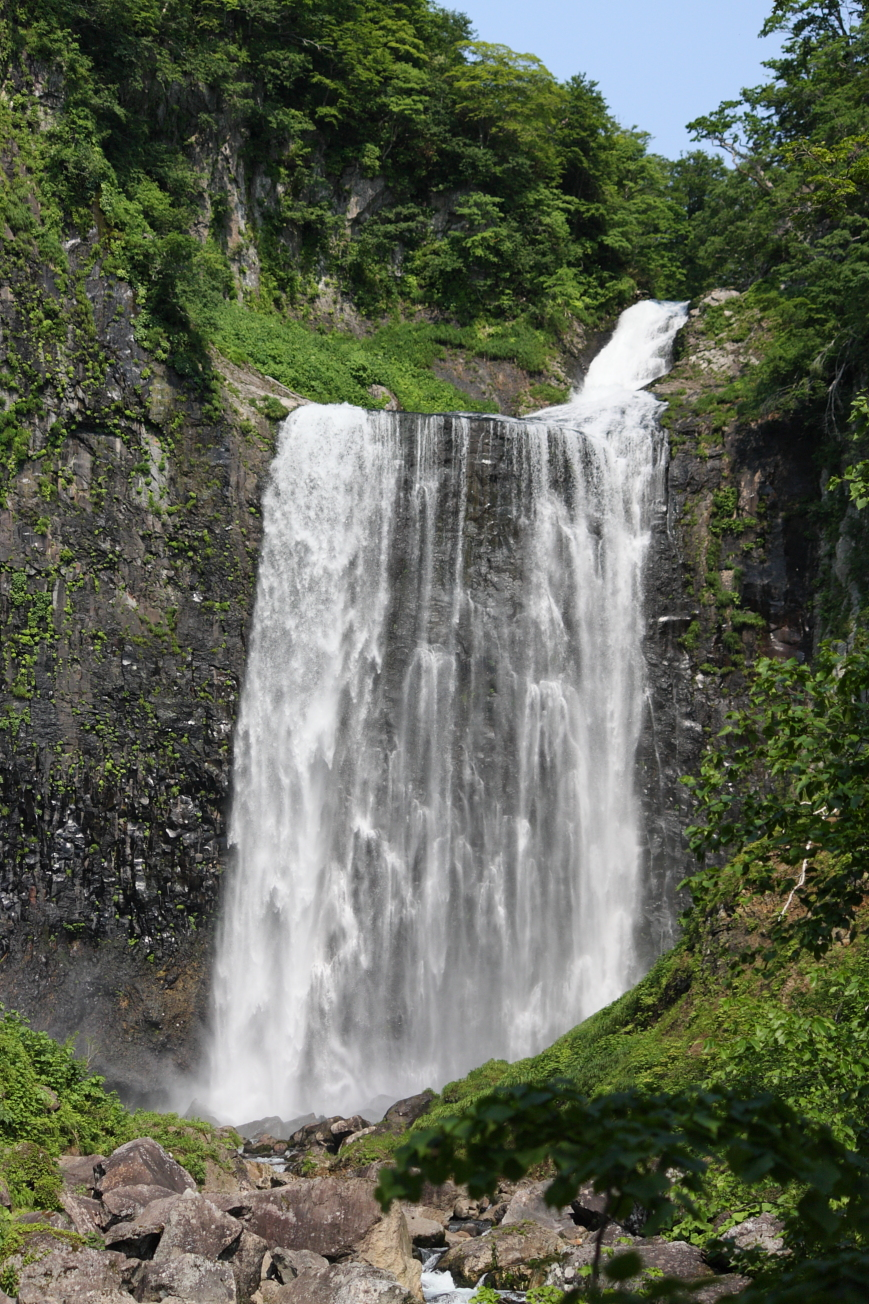
3. Garō Falls

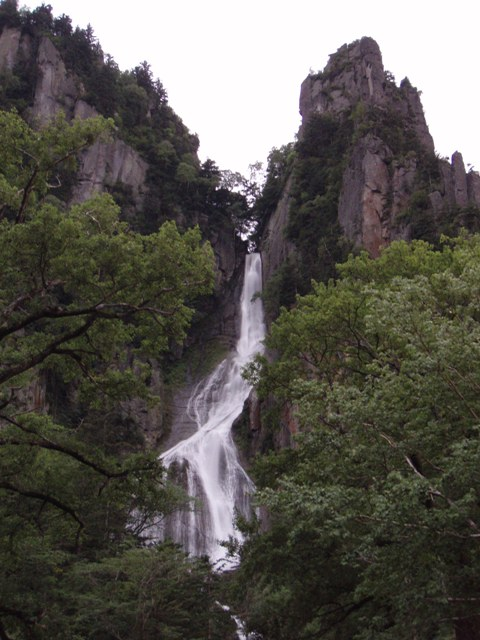
4. Ryusei-Ginga Falls

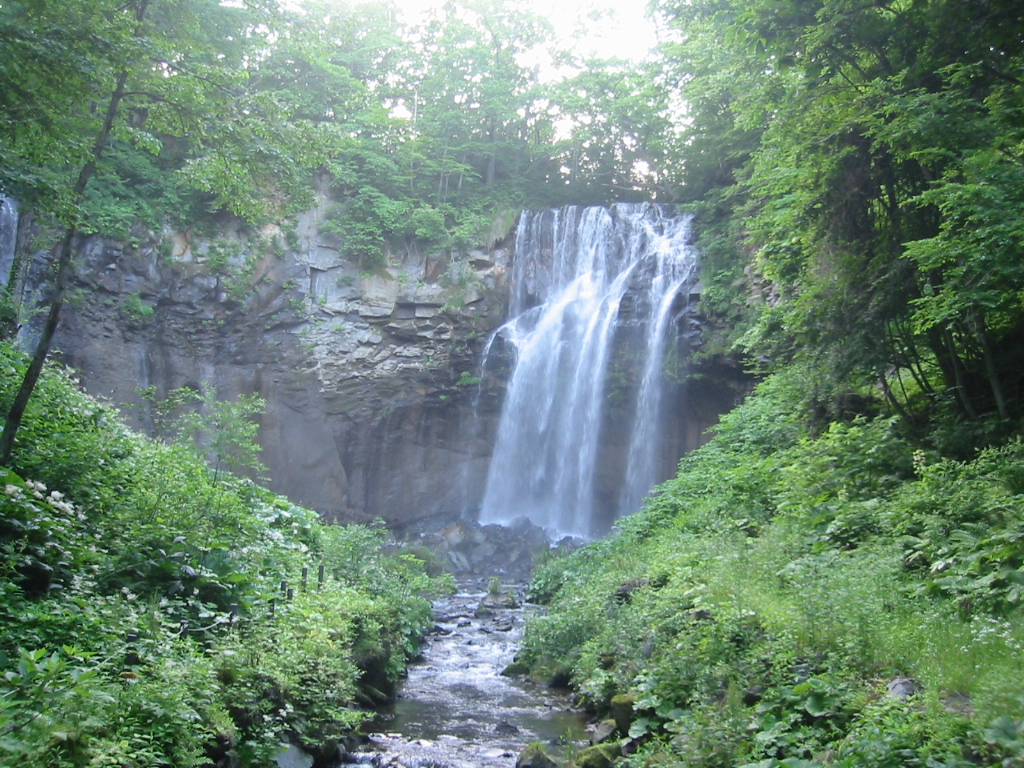
5. Ashiribetsu Falls

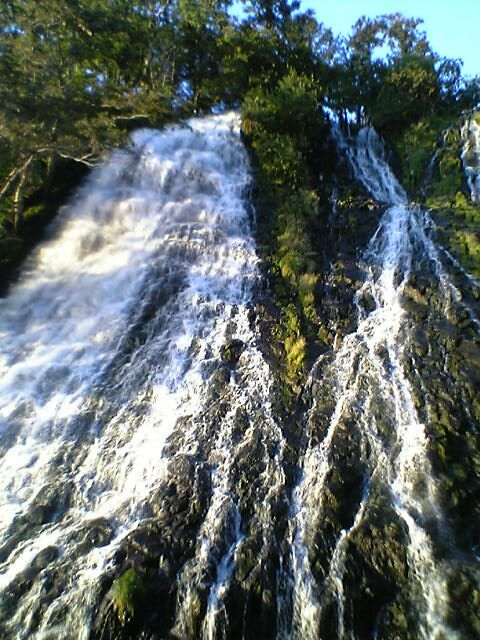
6. Oshinkoshin Falls

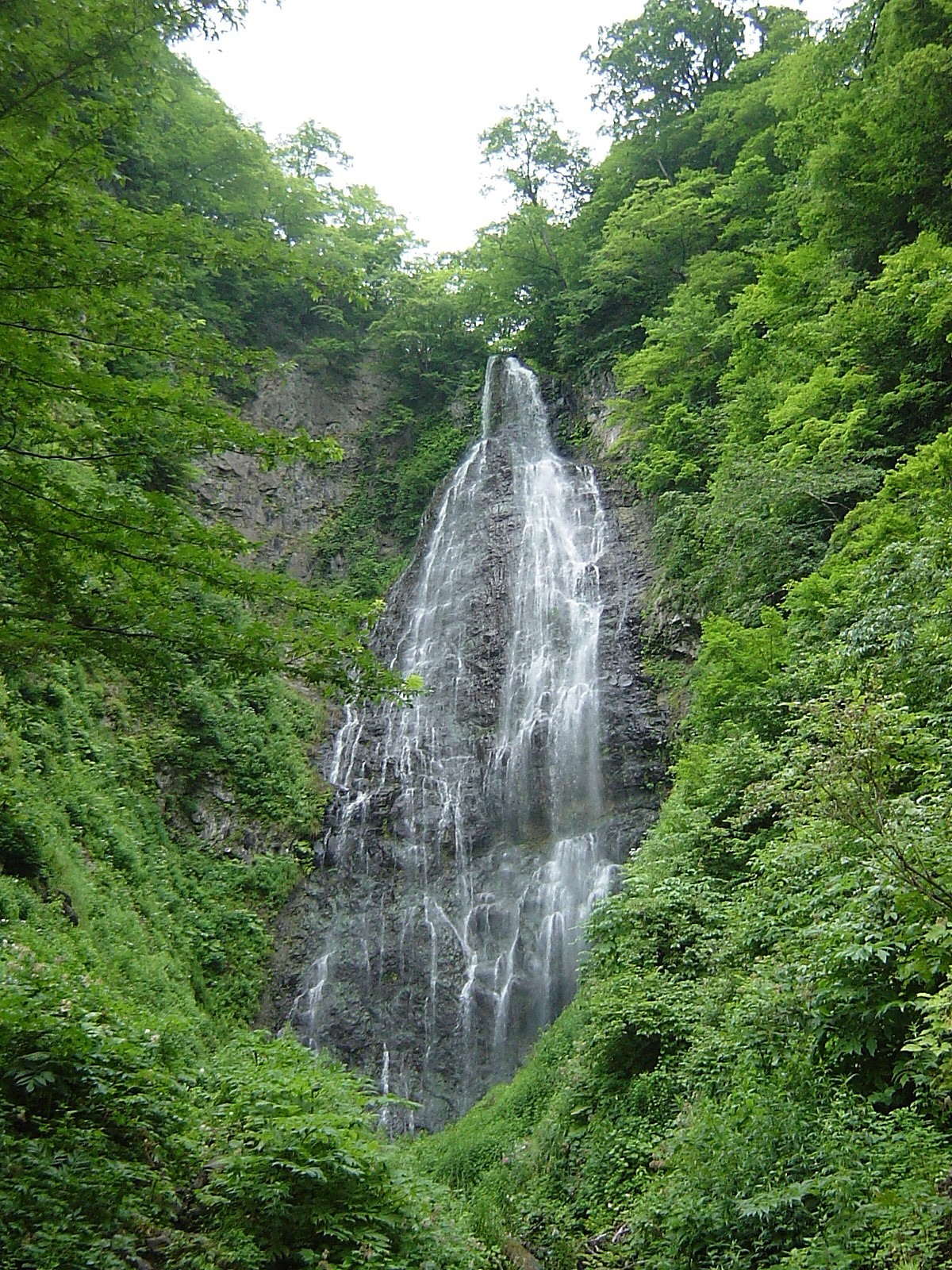
7. Kurokuma Falls

9. Fudō Falls

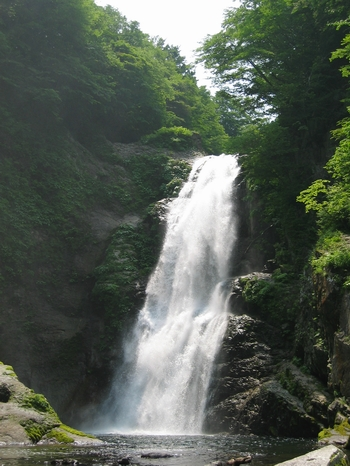
10. Akiu Great Falls

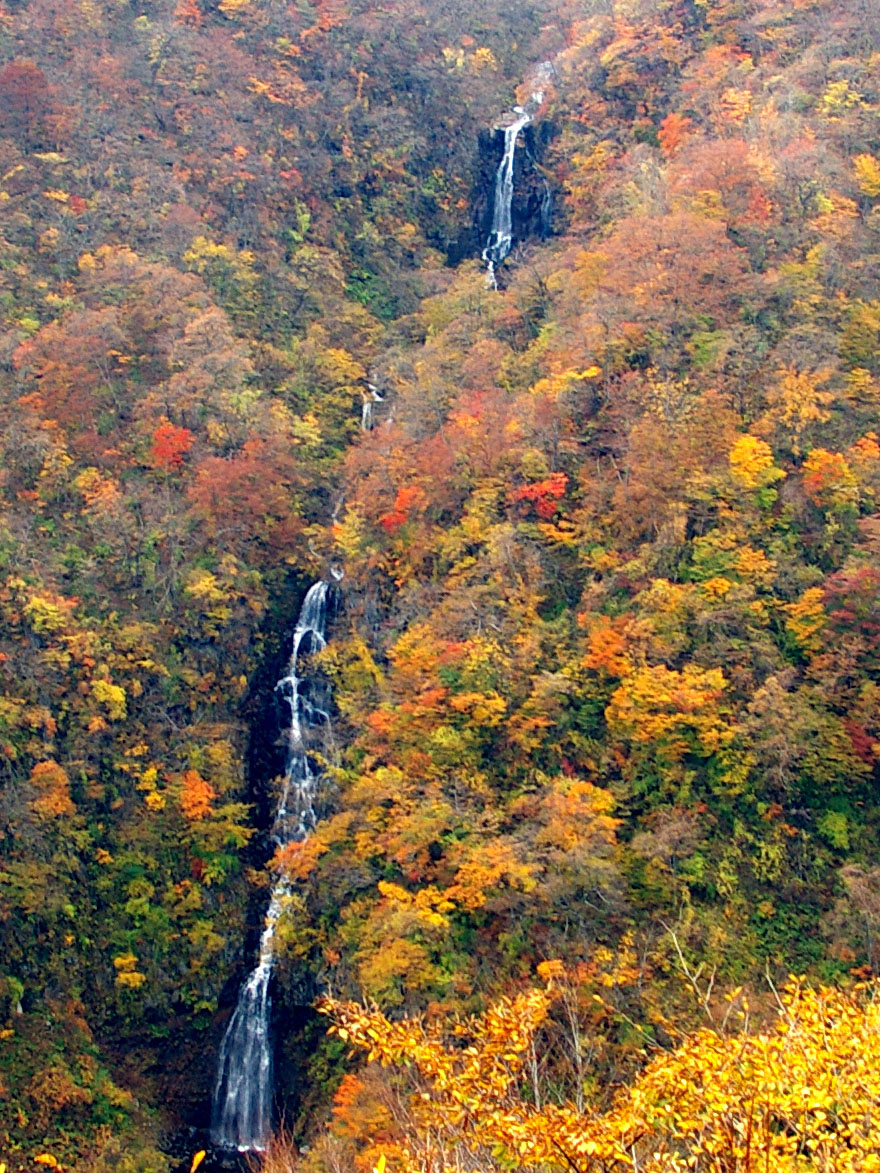
11. Sankai Falls

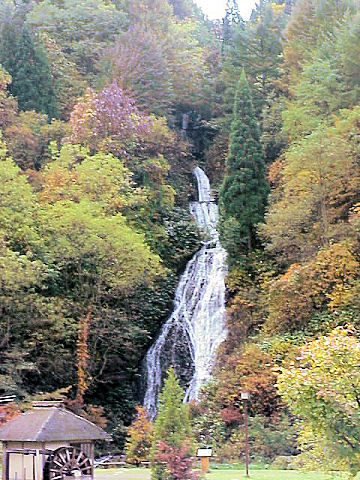
12. Nanataki Falls

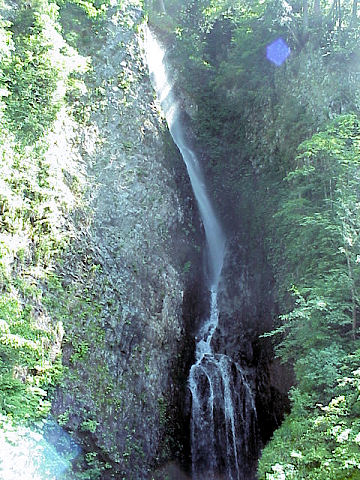
13. Chagama Falls

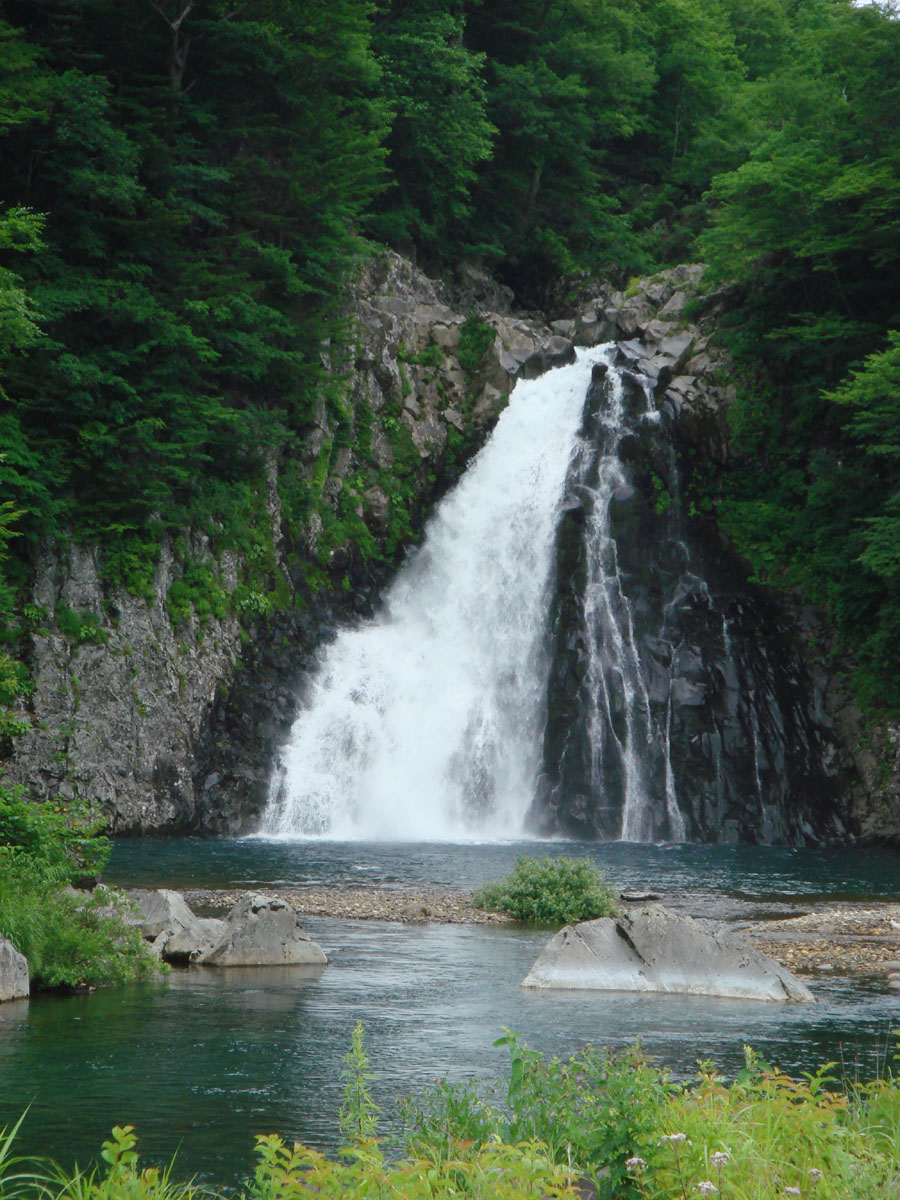
14. Hōttai Falls

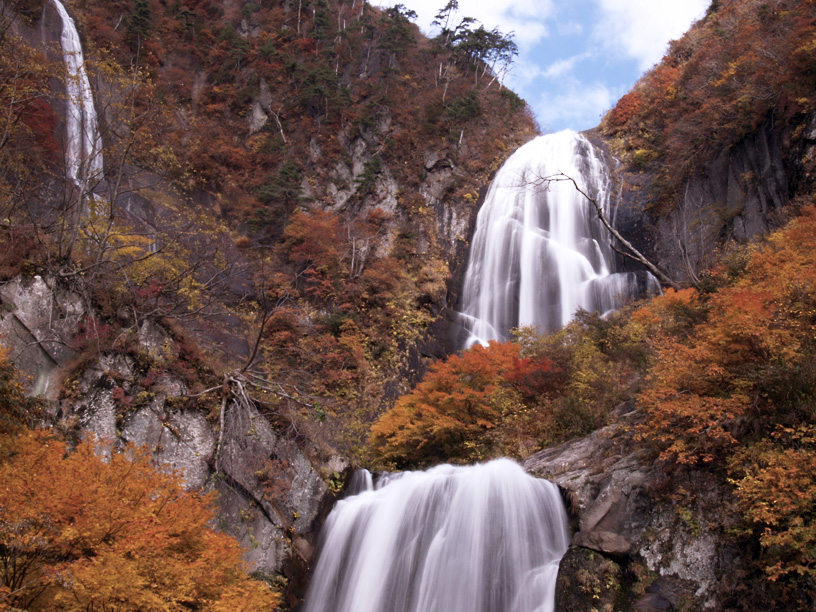
15. Yasu Falls

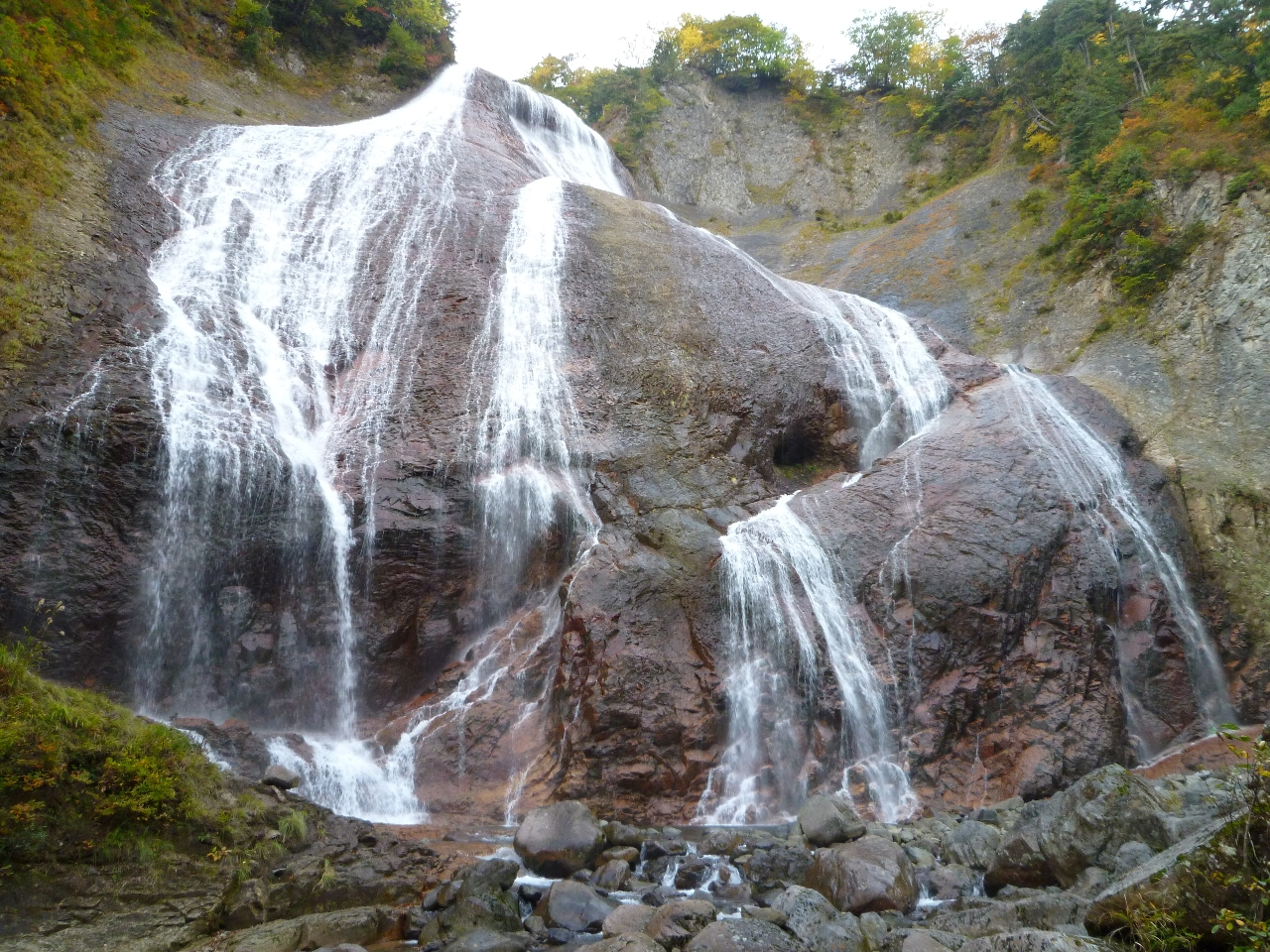
16. Namekawa Great Falls

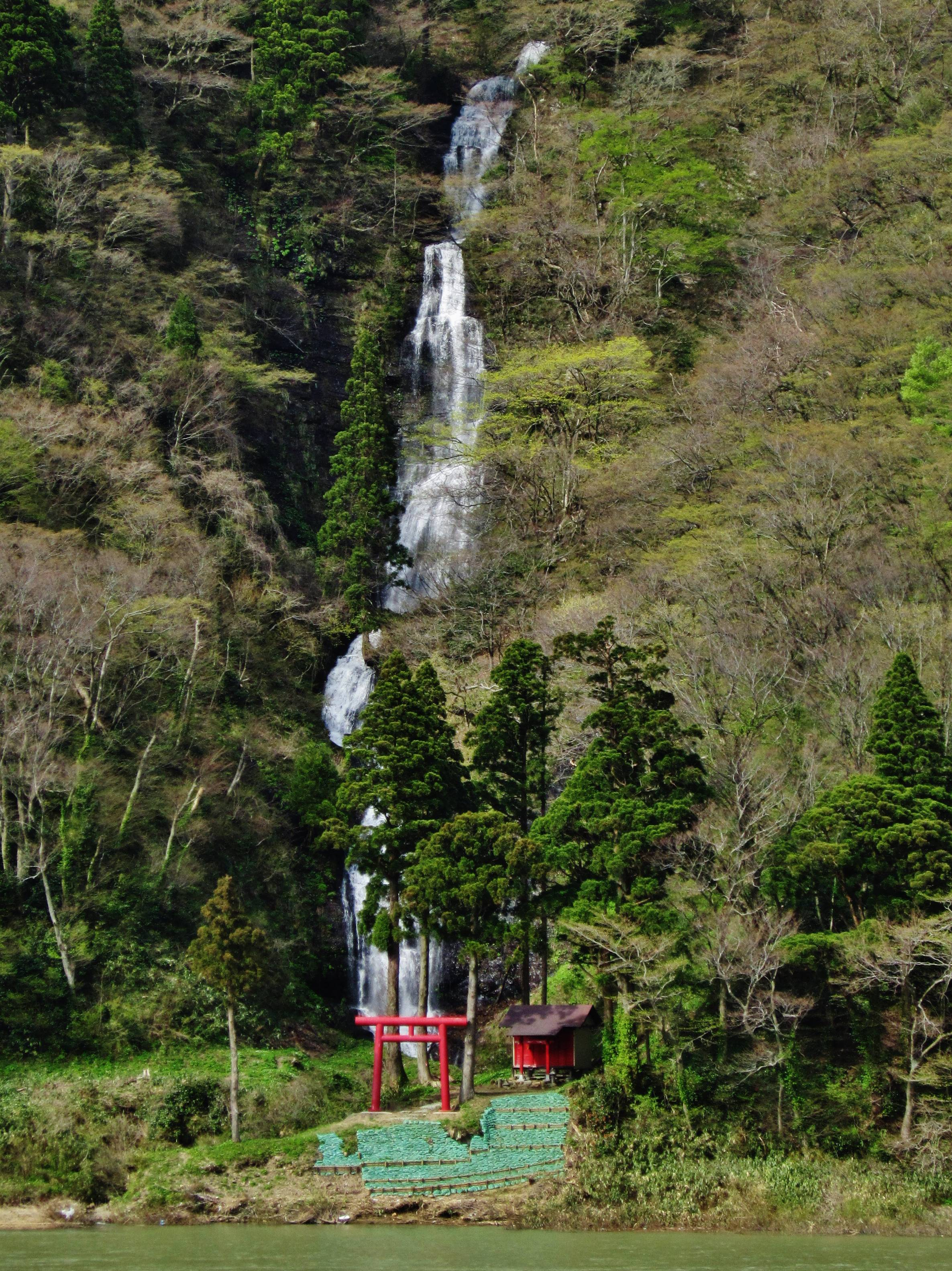
17. Shiraito Falls

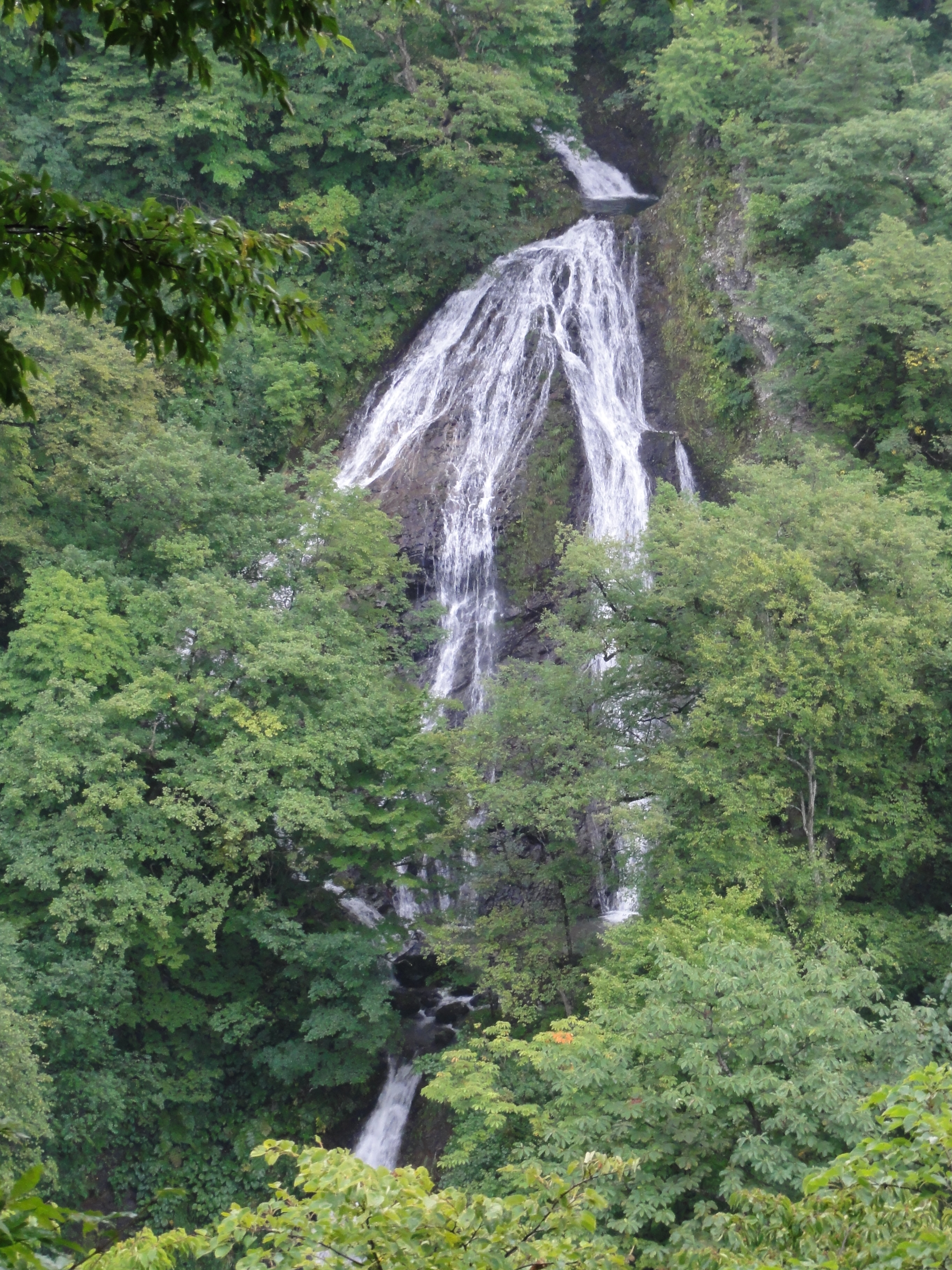
18. Nanatsu Falls

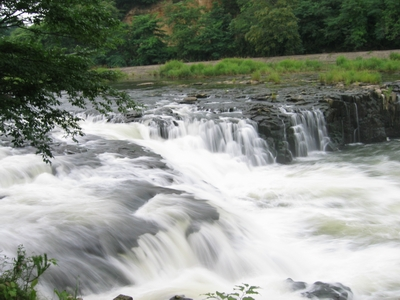
19. Otsuji Falls

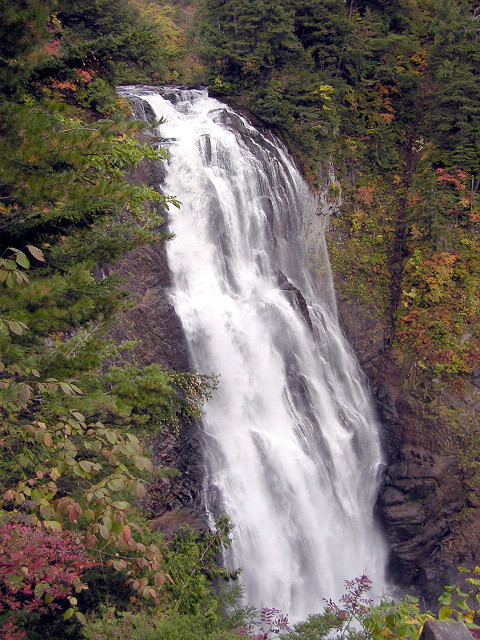
20. Sanjō Falls

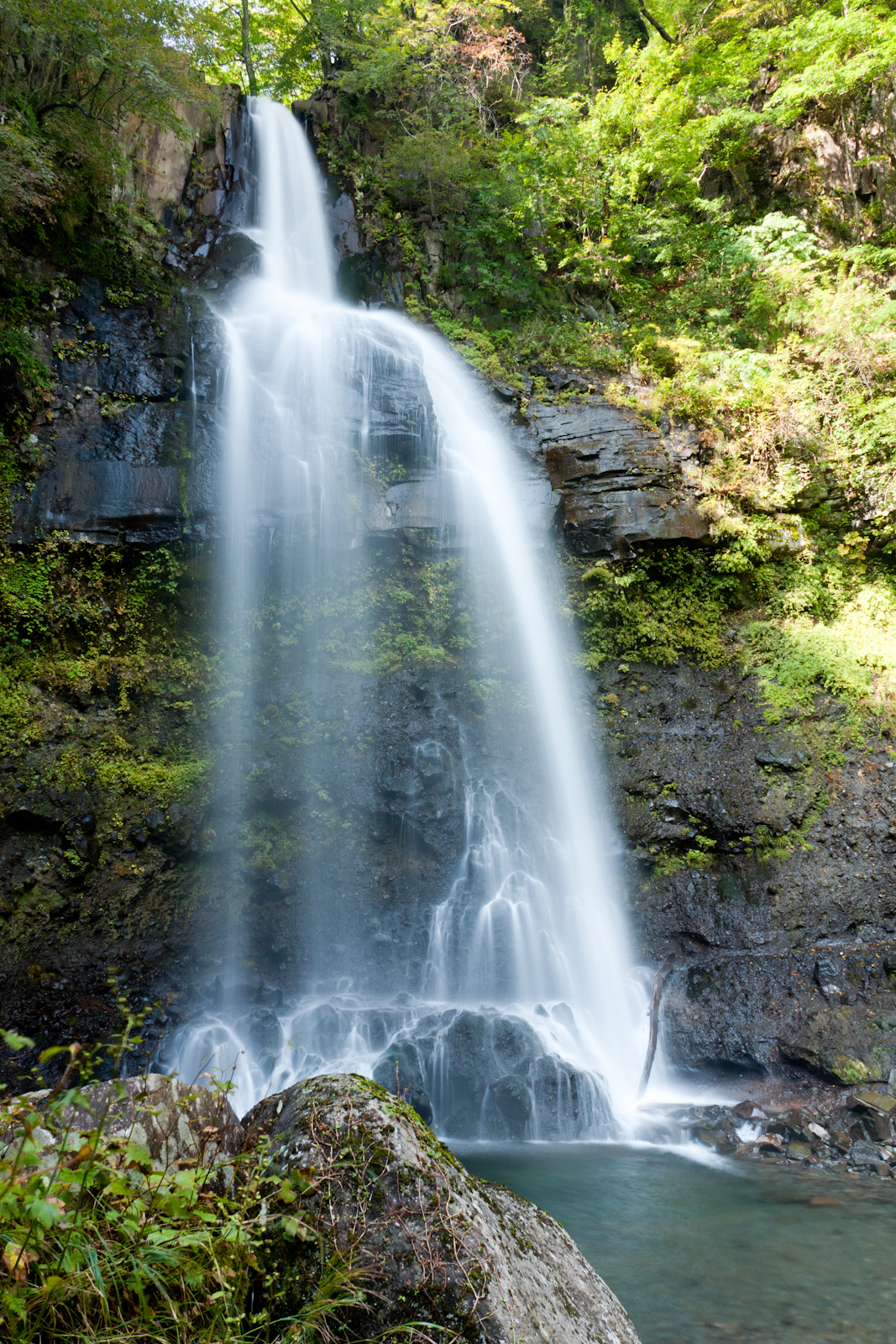
21. Chōshi Falls

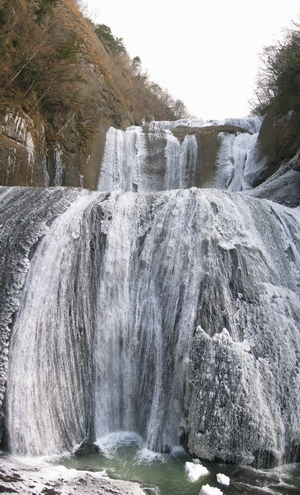
22. Fukuroda Falls

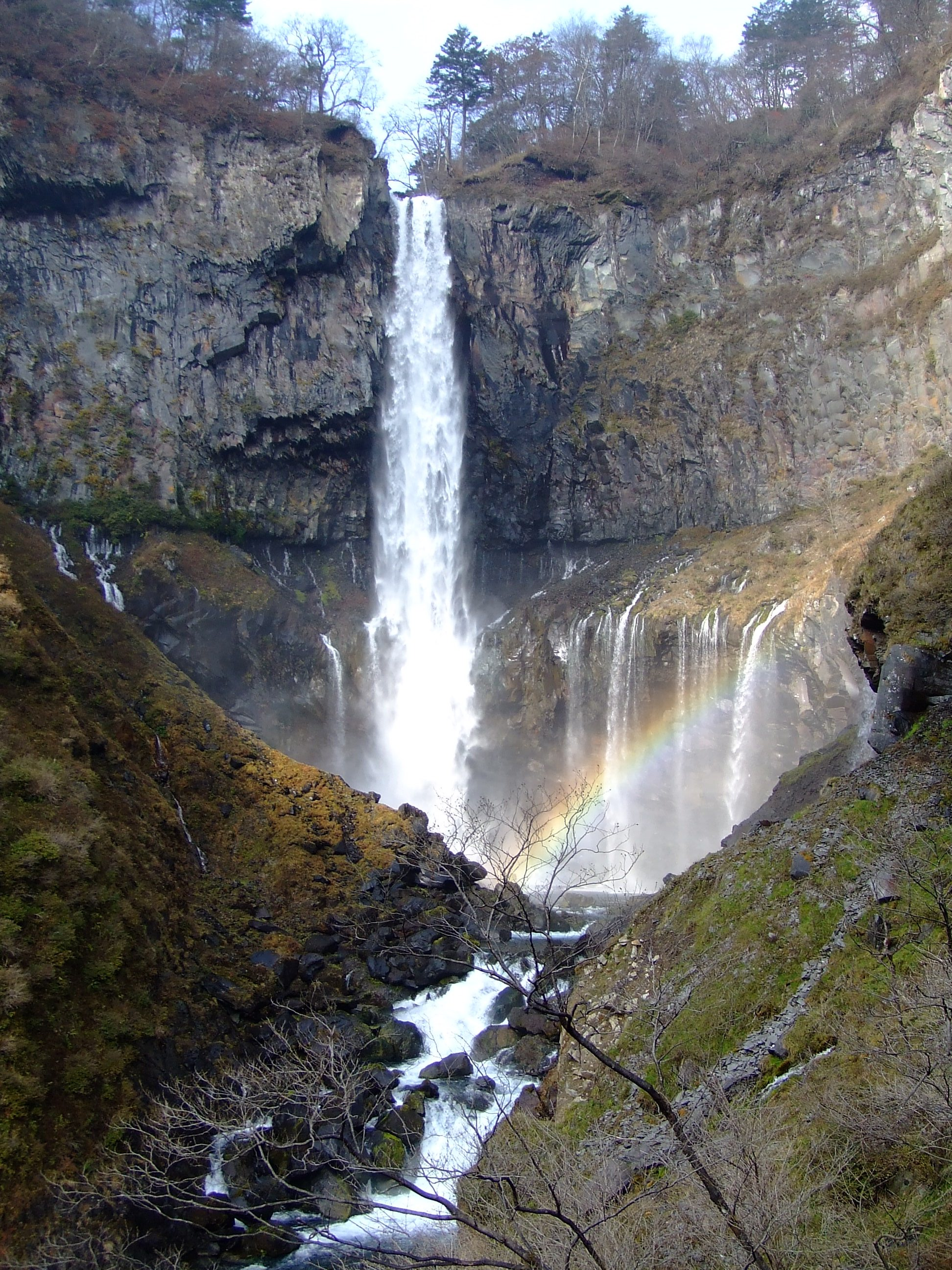
23. Kegon Falls

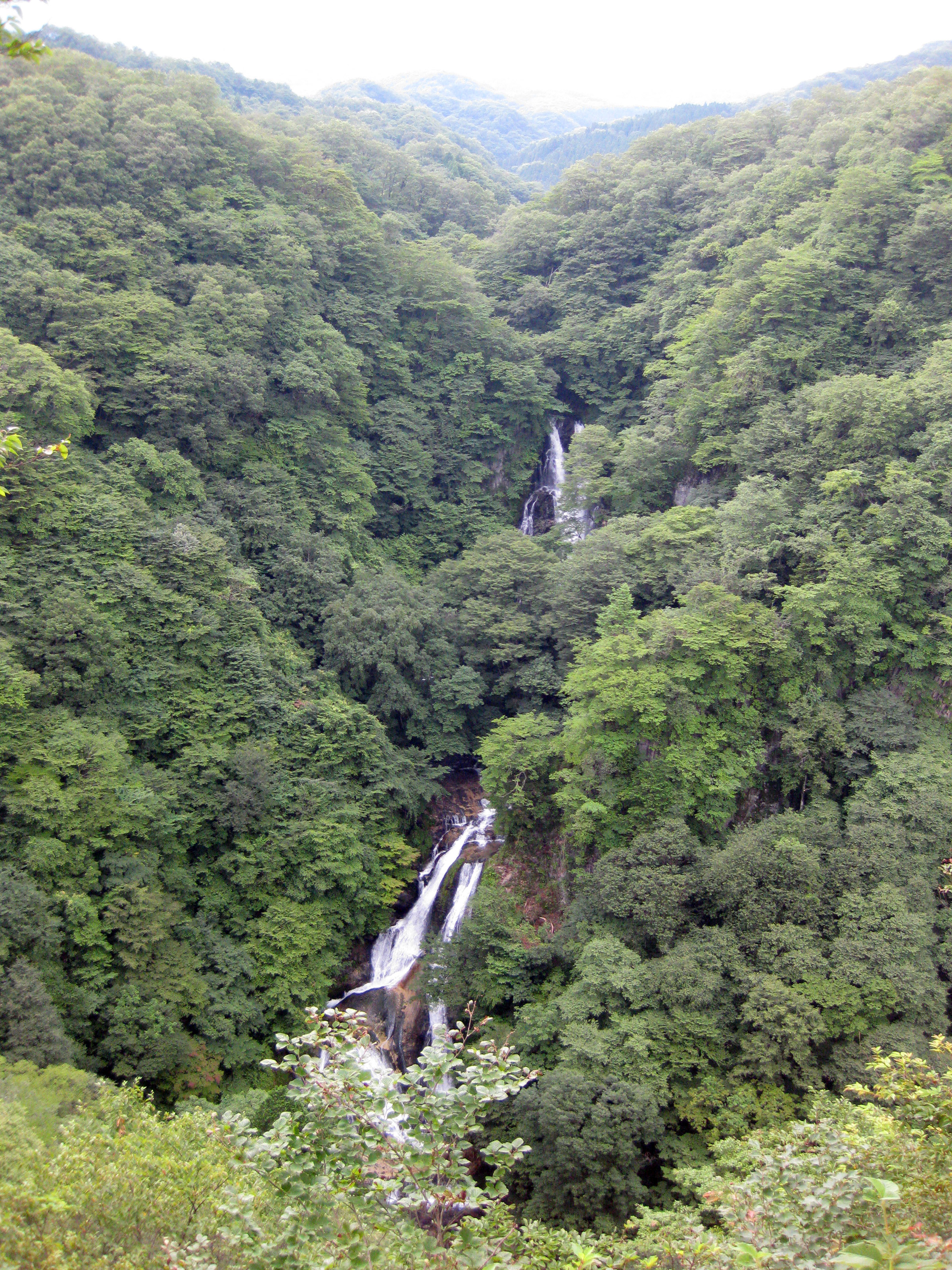
24. Kirifuri Falls

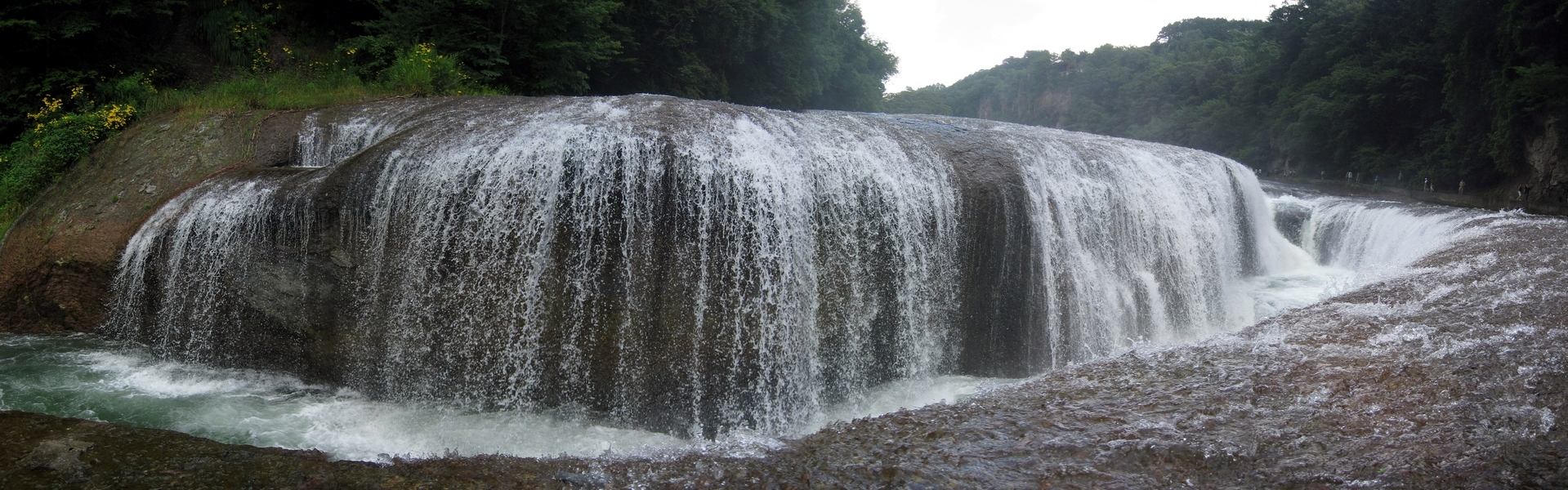
25. Fukiware Falls

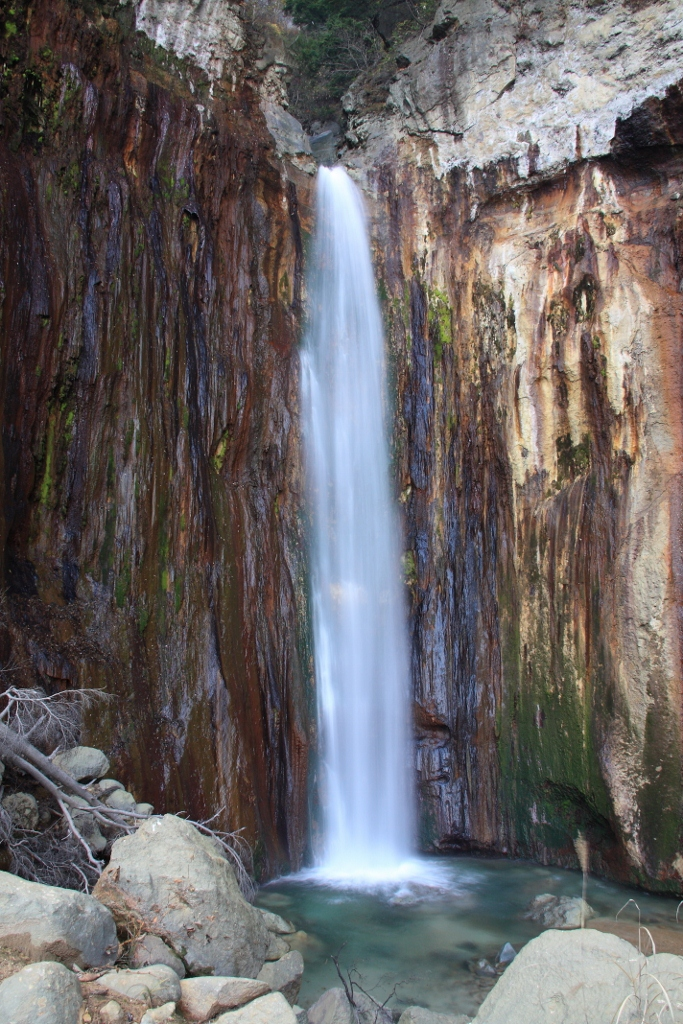
26. Jōfu Falls

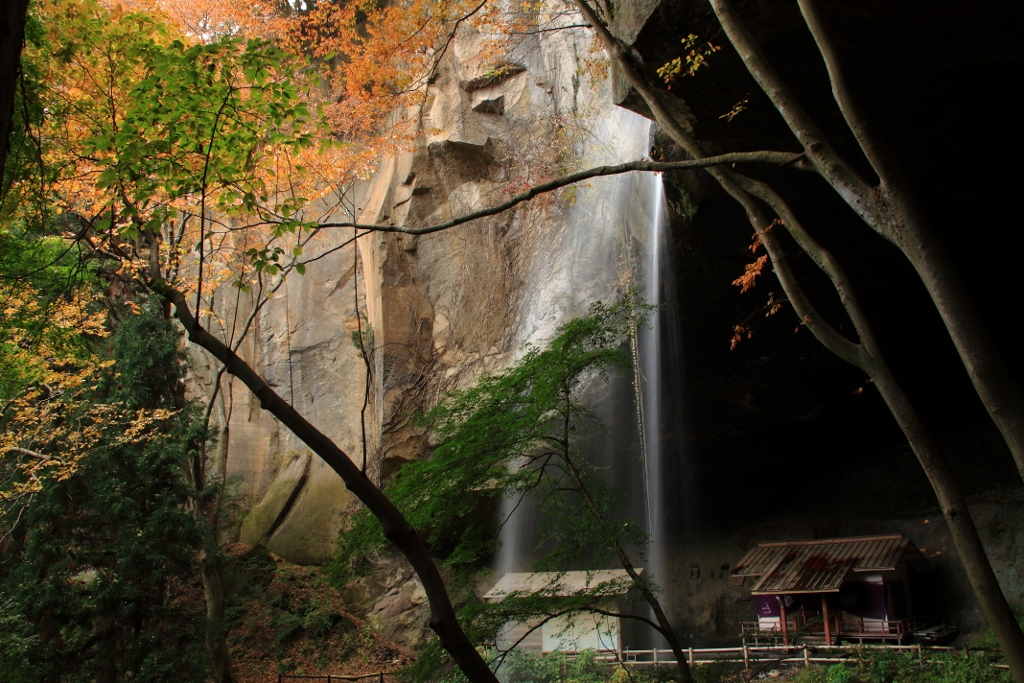
27. Tanashita no Fudō Falls

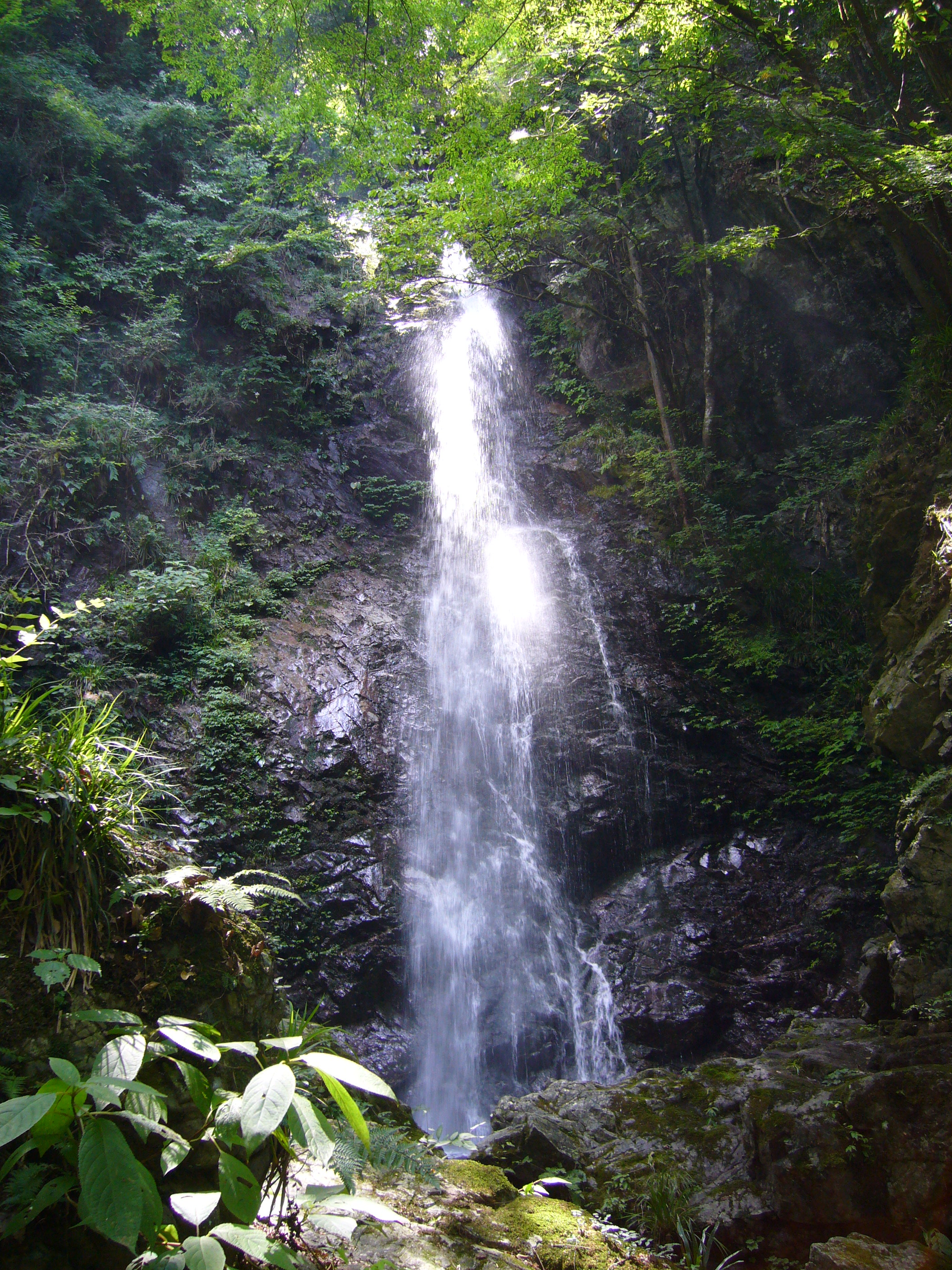
29. Hossawa Falls

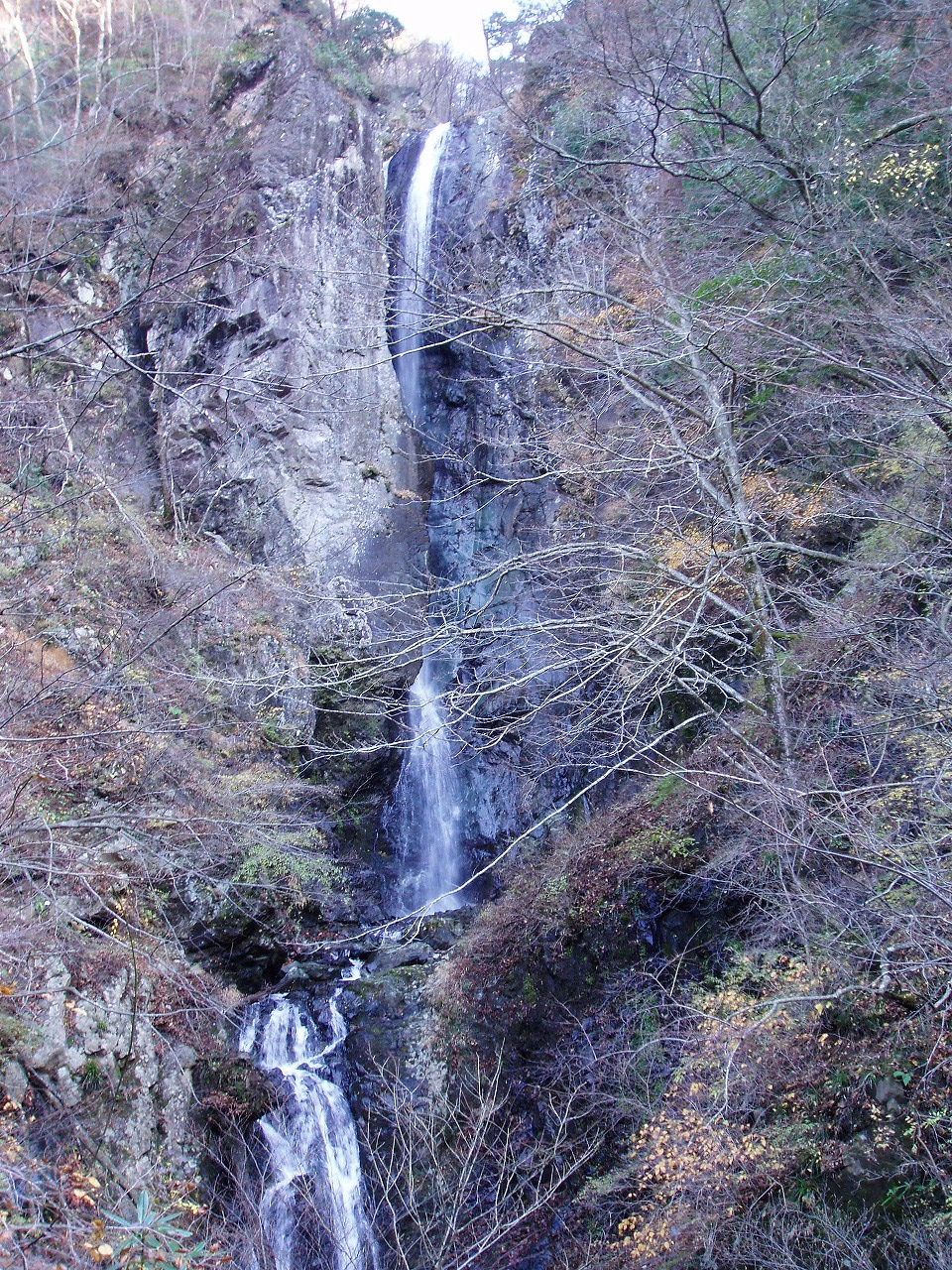
30. Hayato Great Falls

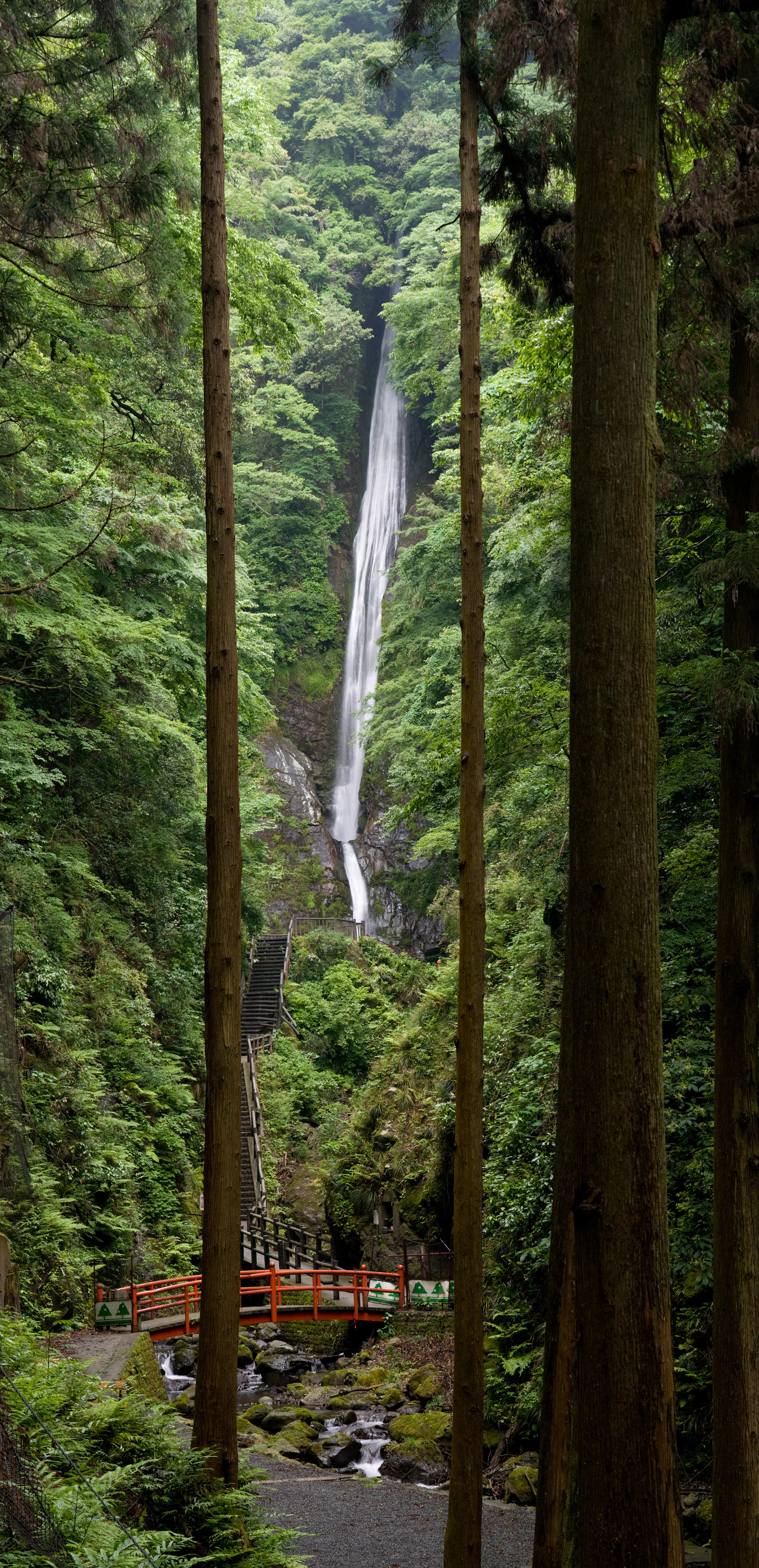
31. Shasui Falls

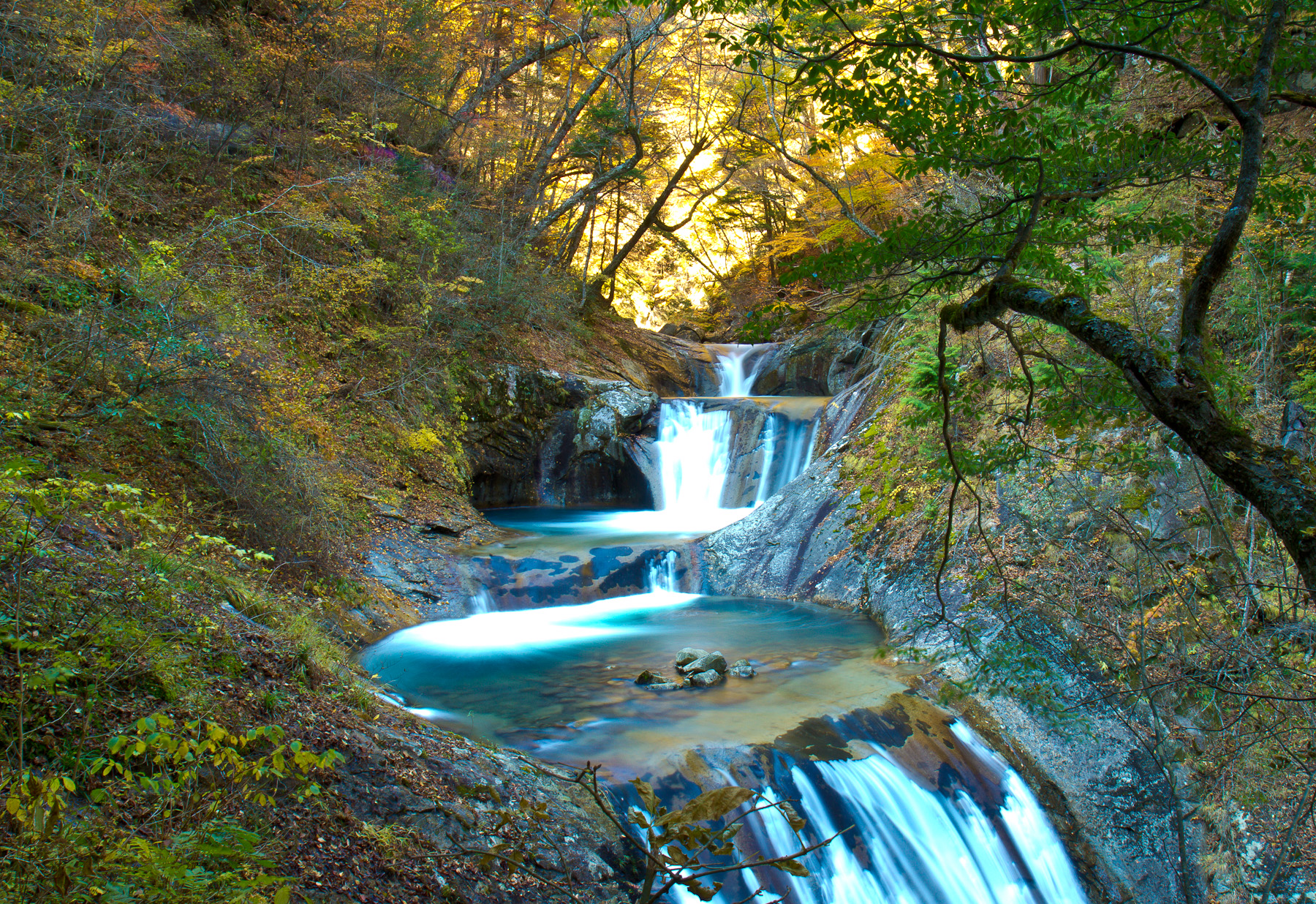
32. Nanatsugamagodan Falls

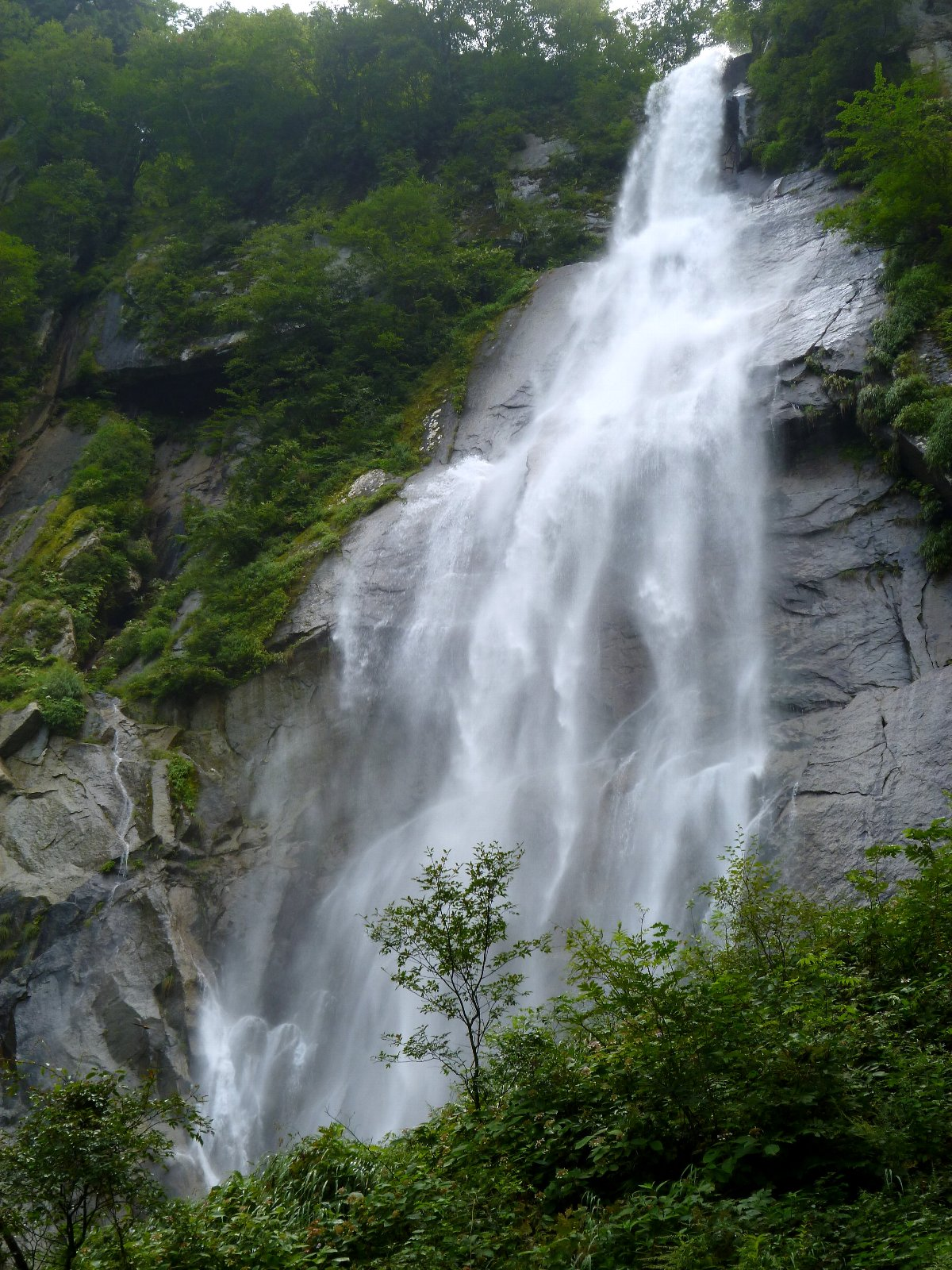
33. Kitashōji Falls

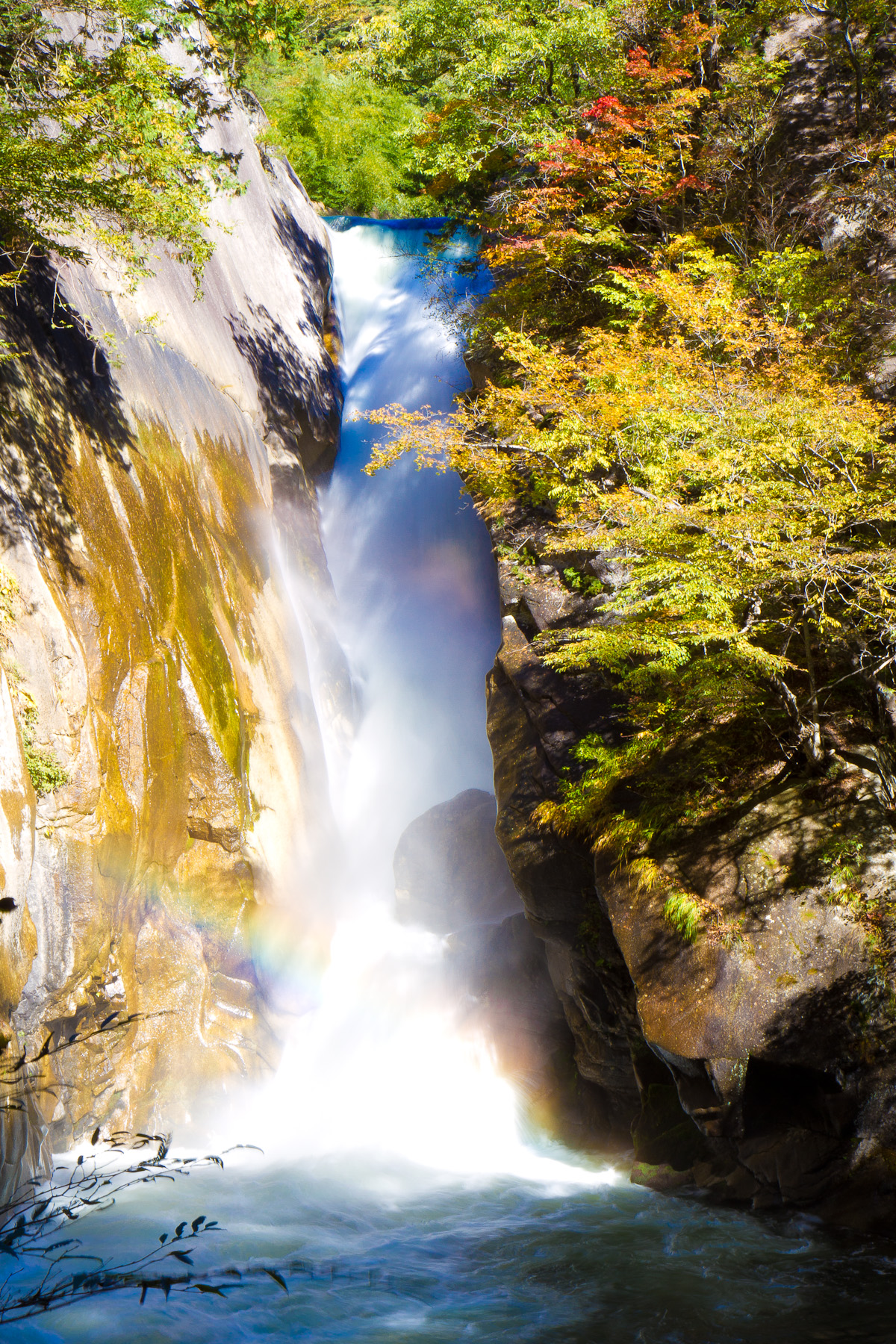
34. Senga Falls

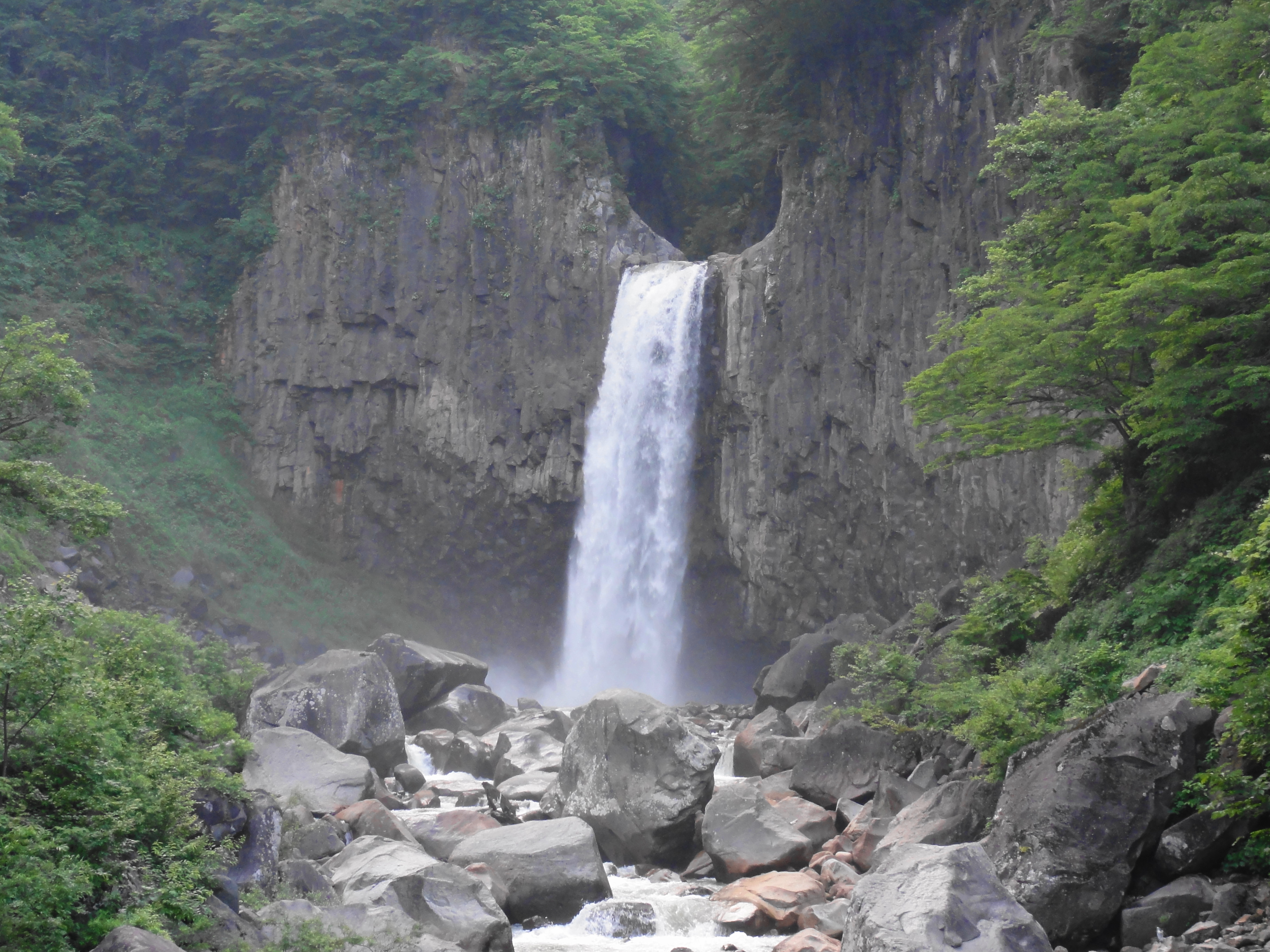
36. Naena Falls

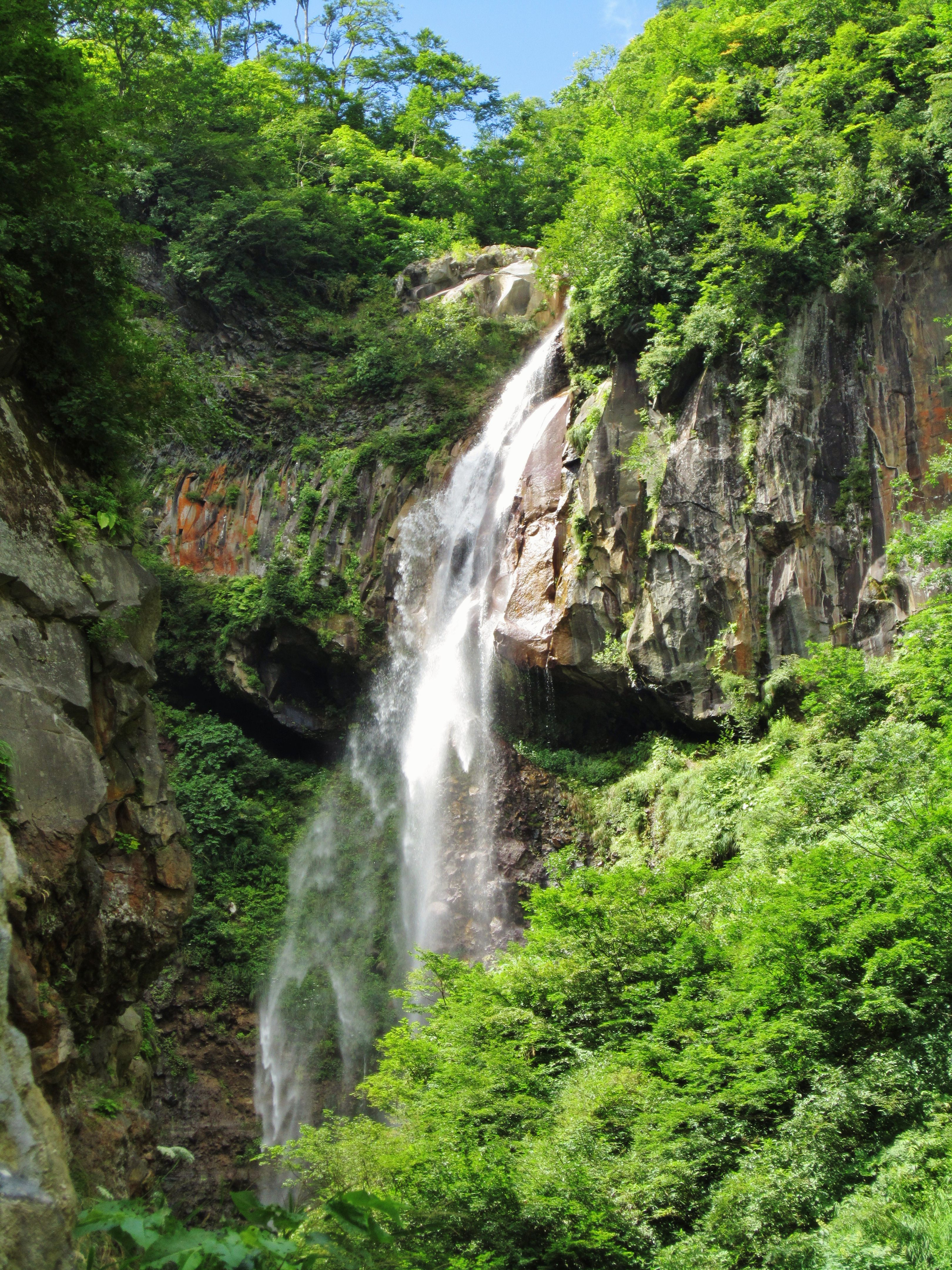
37. Sōtaki Falls

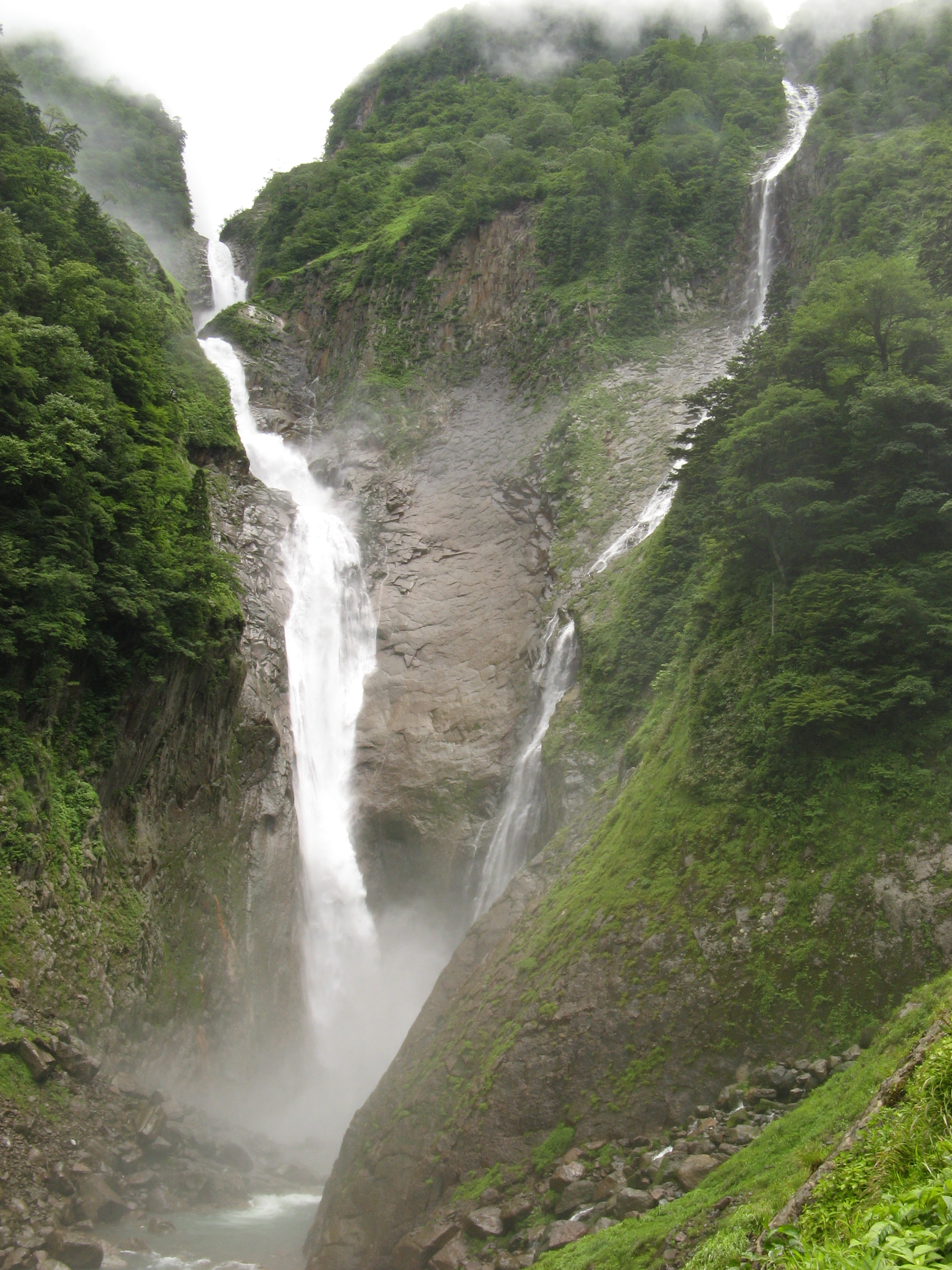
38. Shōmyō Falls

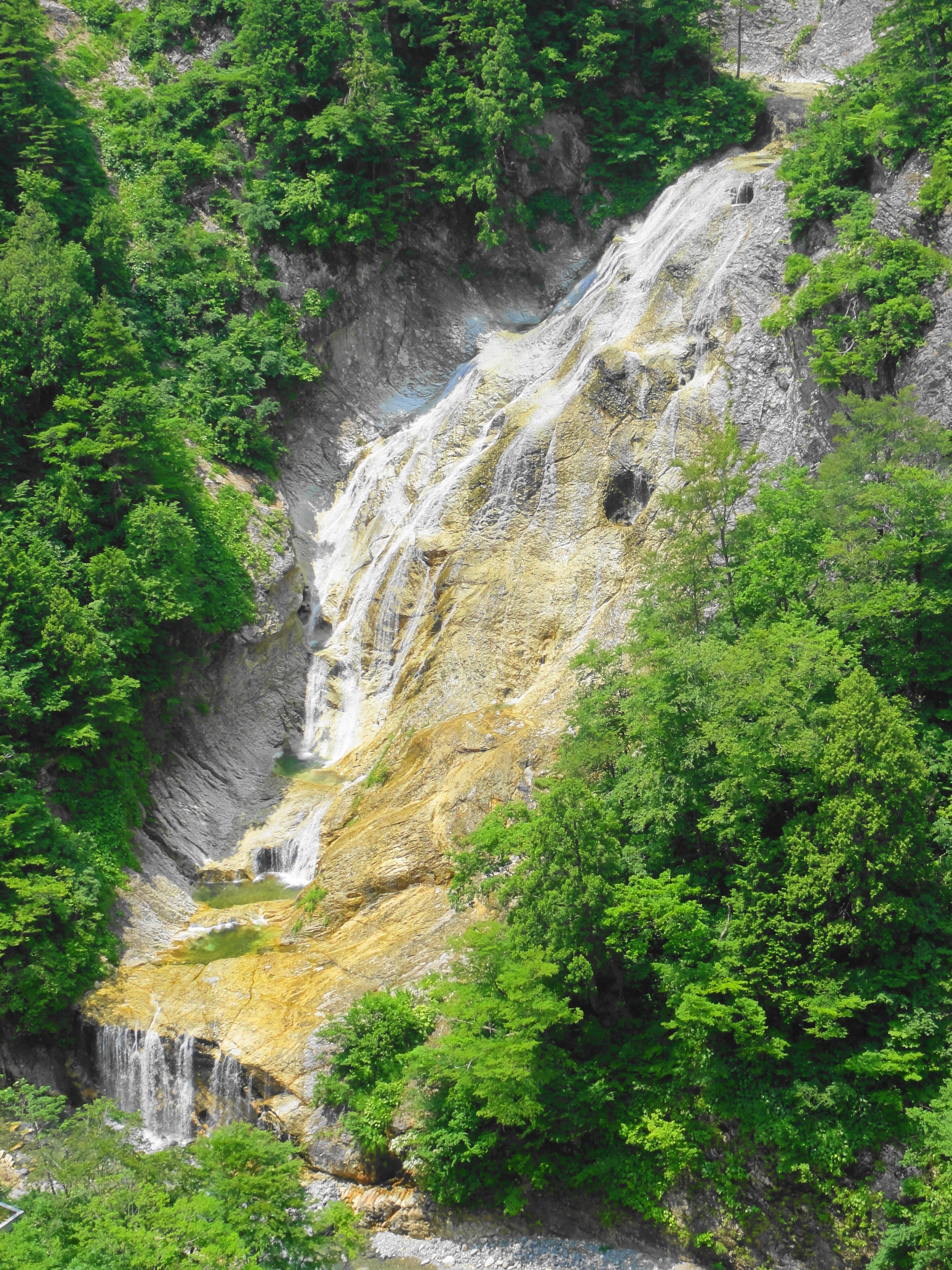
39.Uba Falls

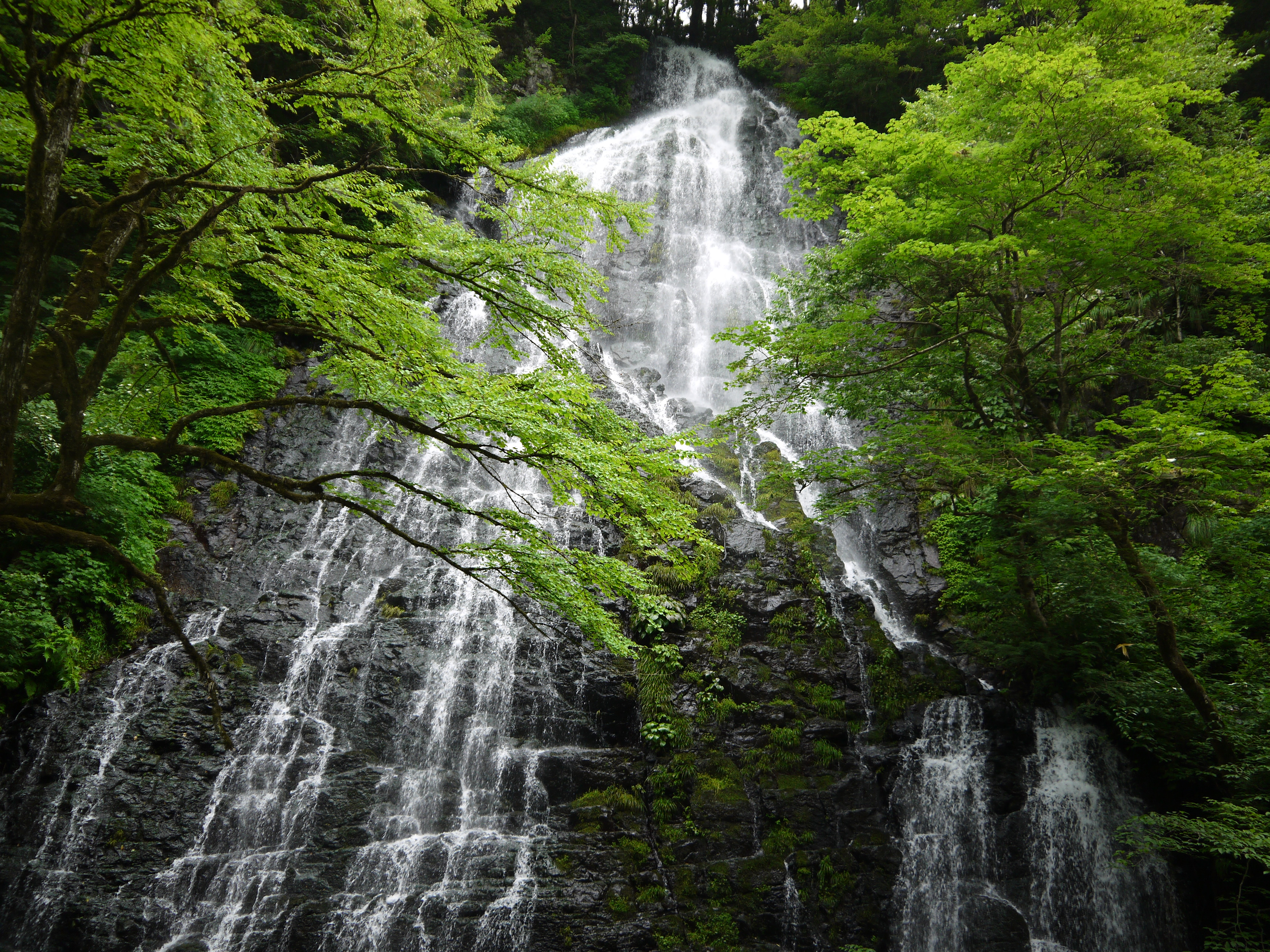
40. Ryūsō Falls

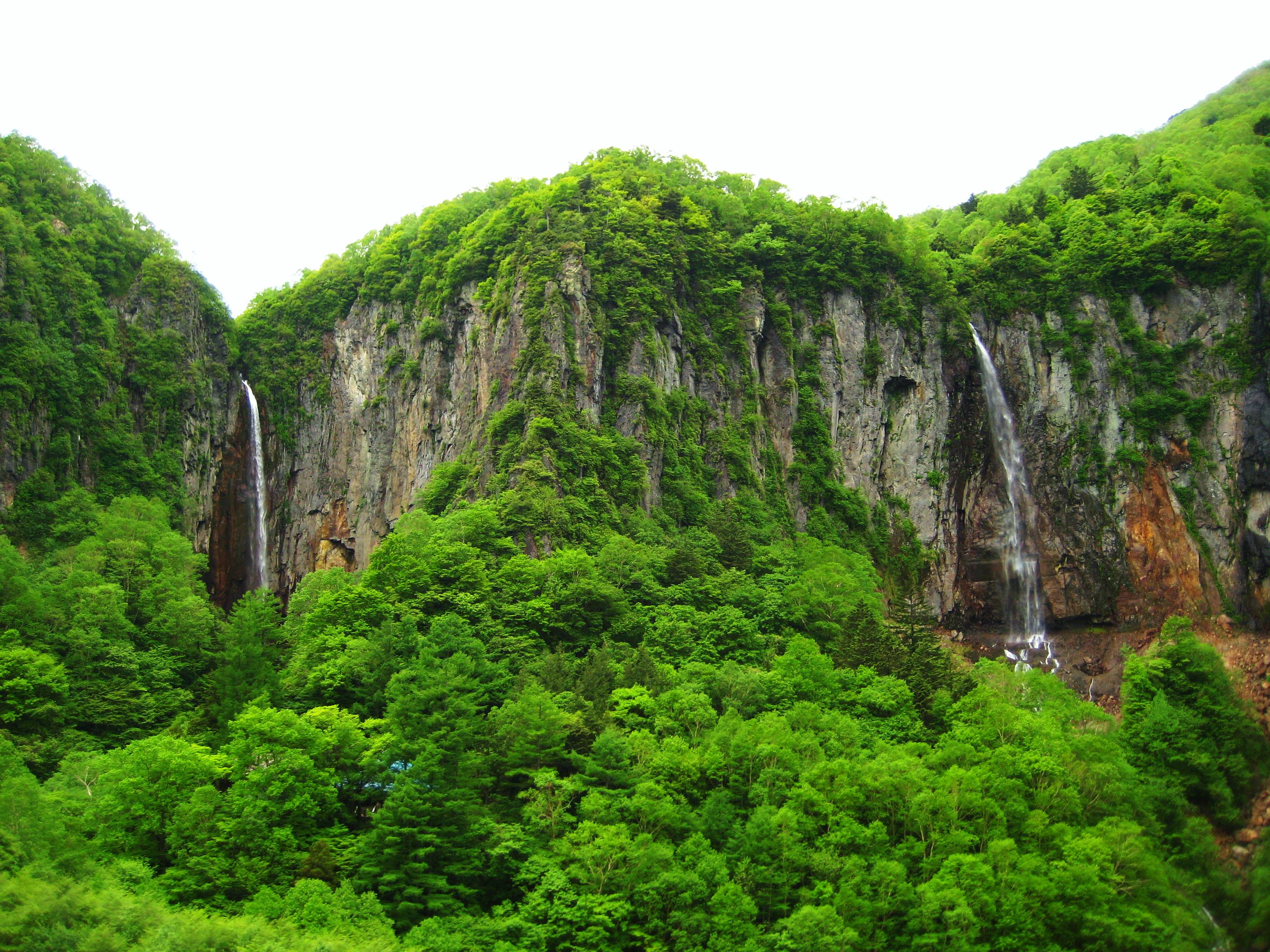
41. Yonako Daibakufu Falls

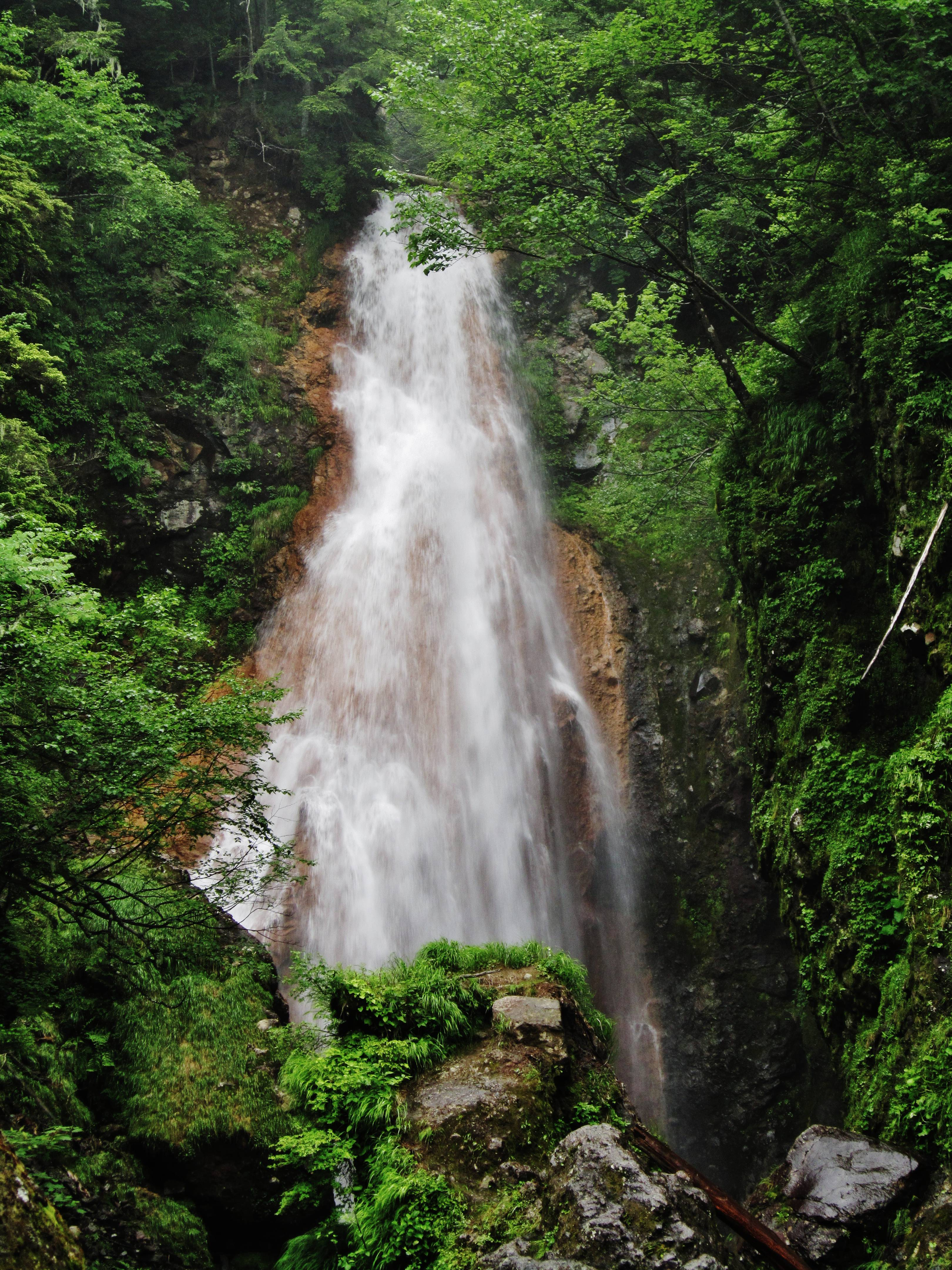
42. Sanbon Falls

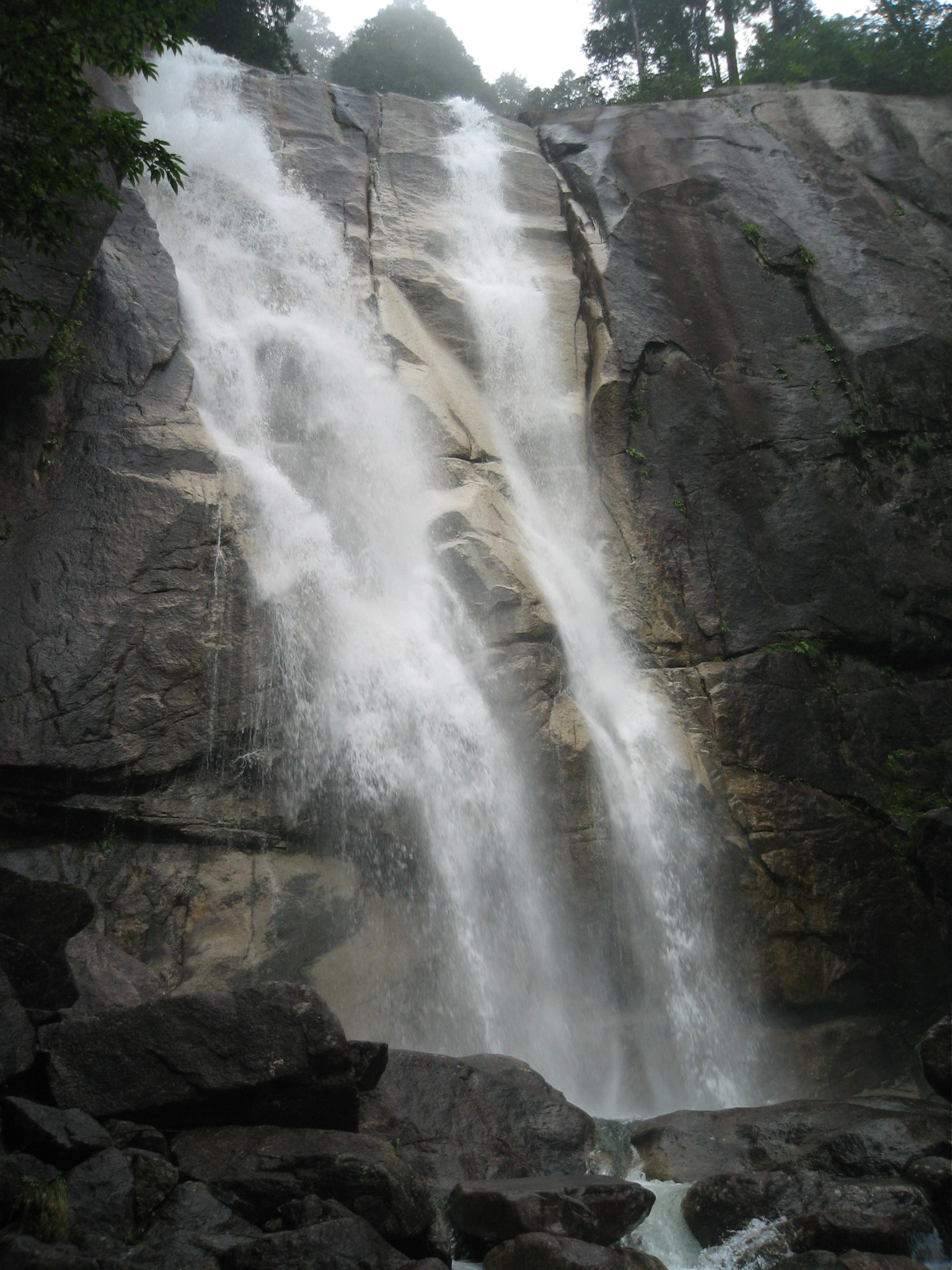
43. Tadachi Falls

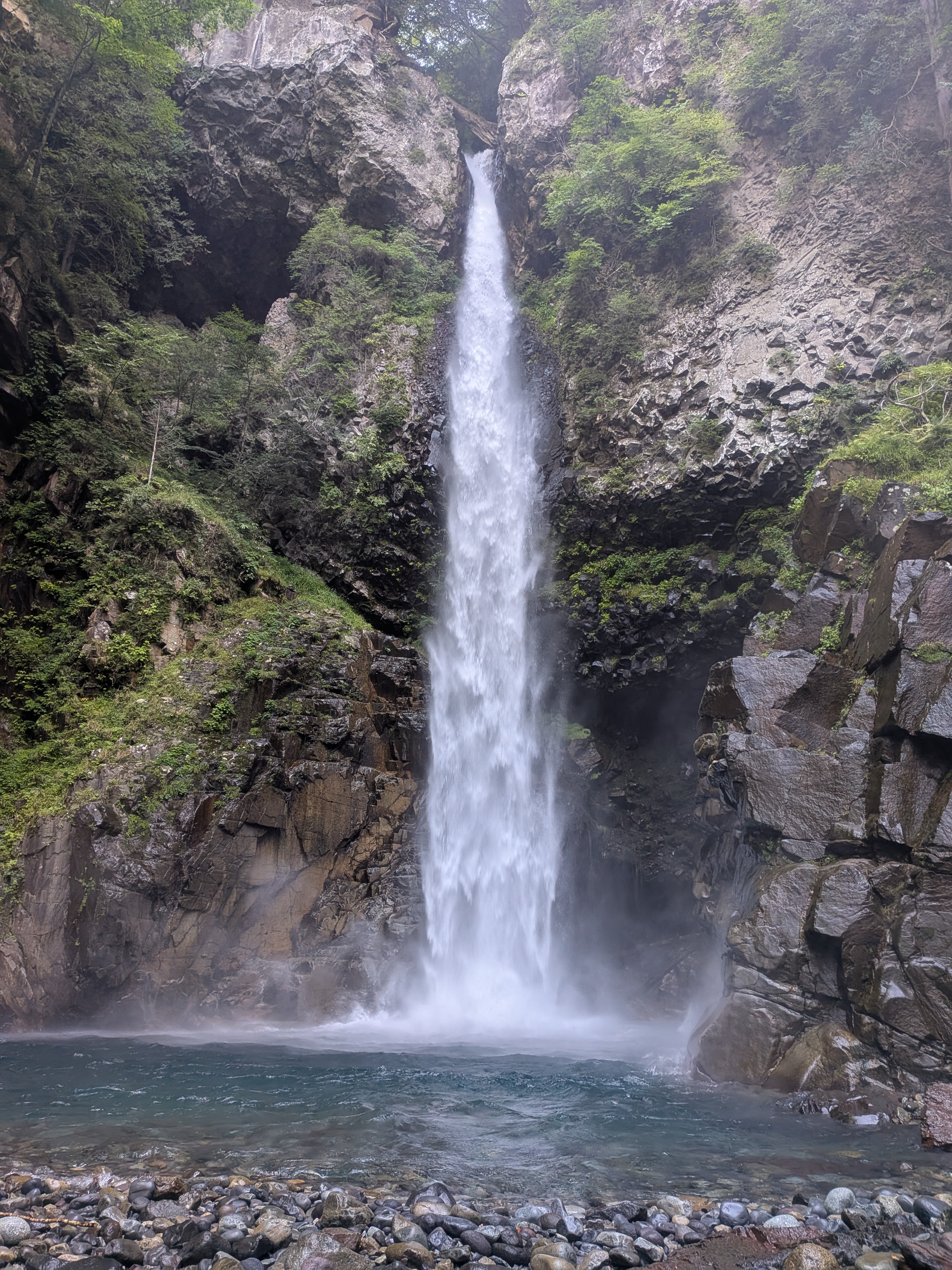
44. Neo Falls

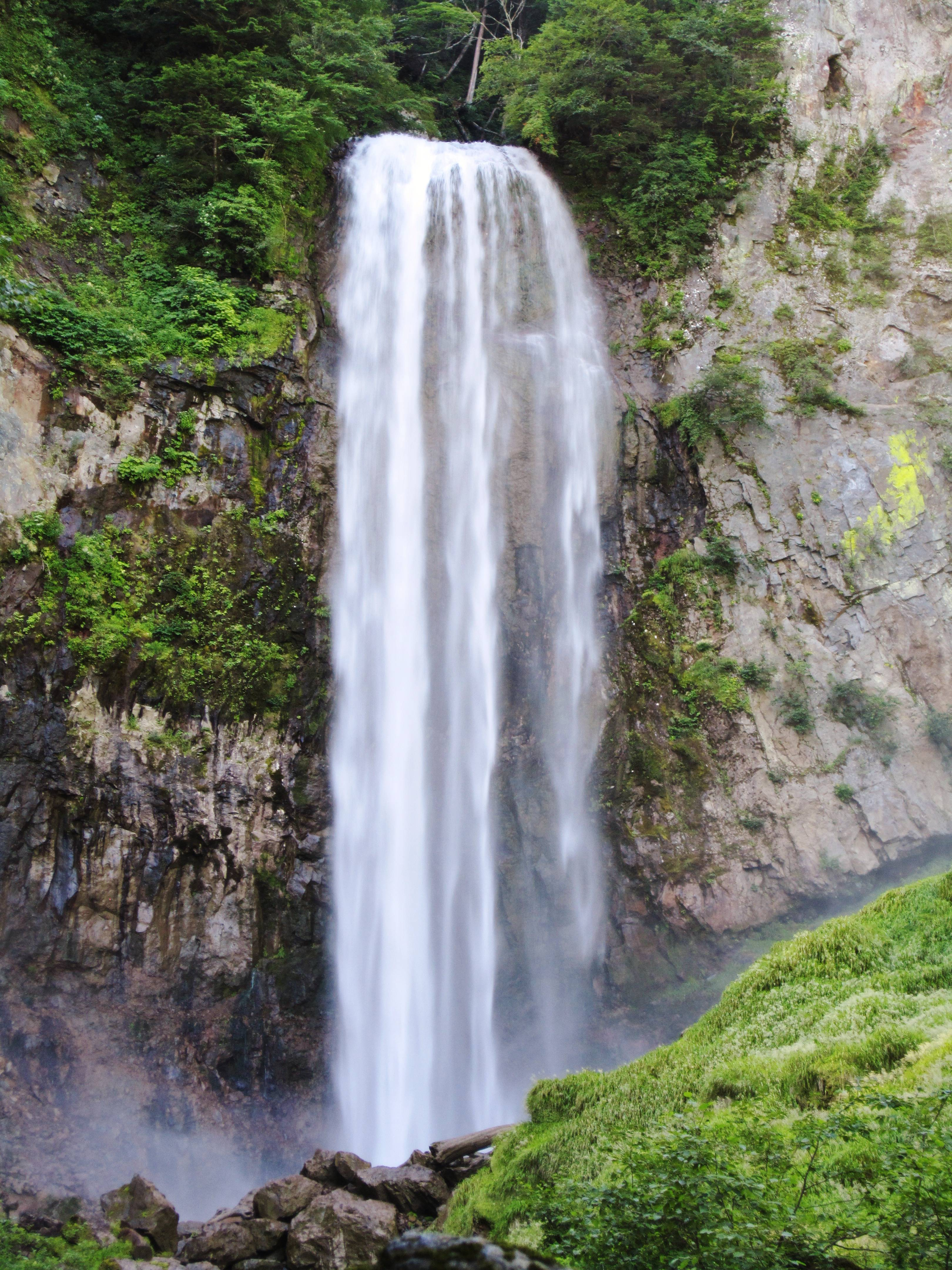
45. Hirayu Great Falls

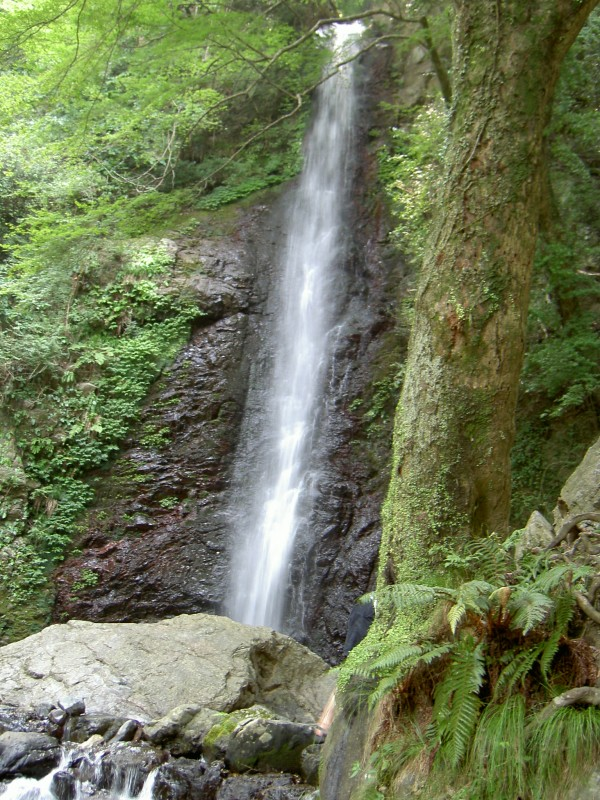
46. Yōrō Falls

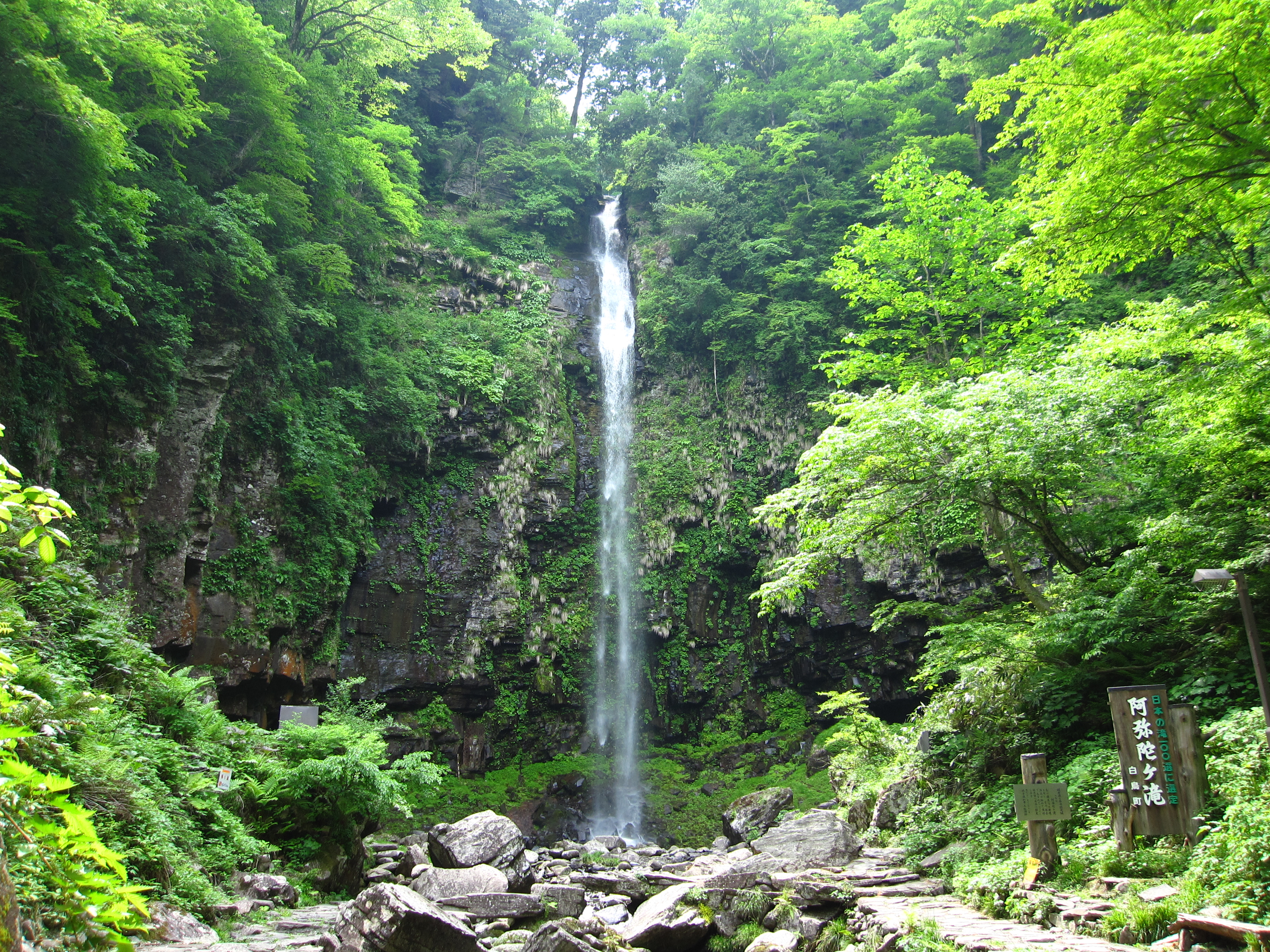
47. Amida Falls

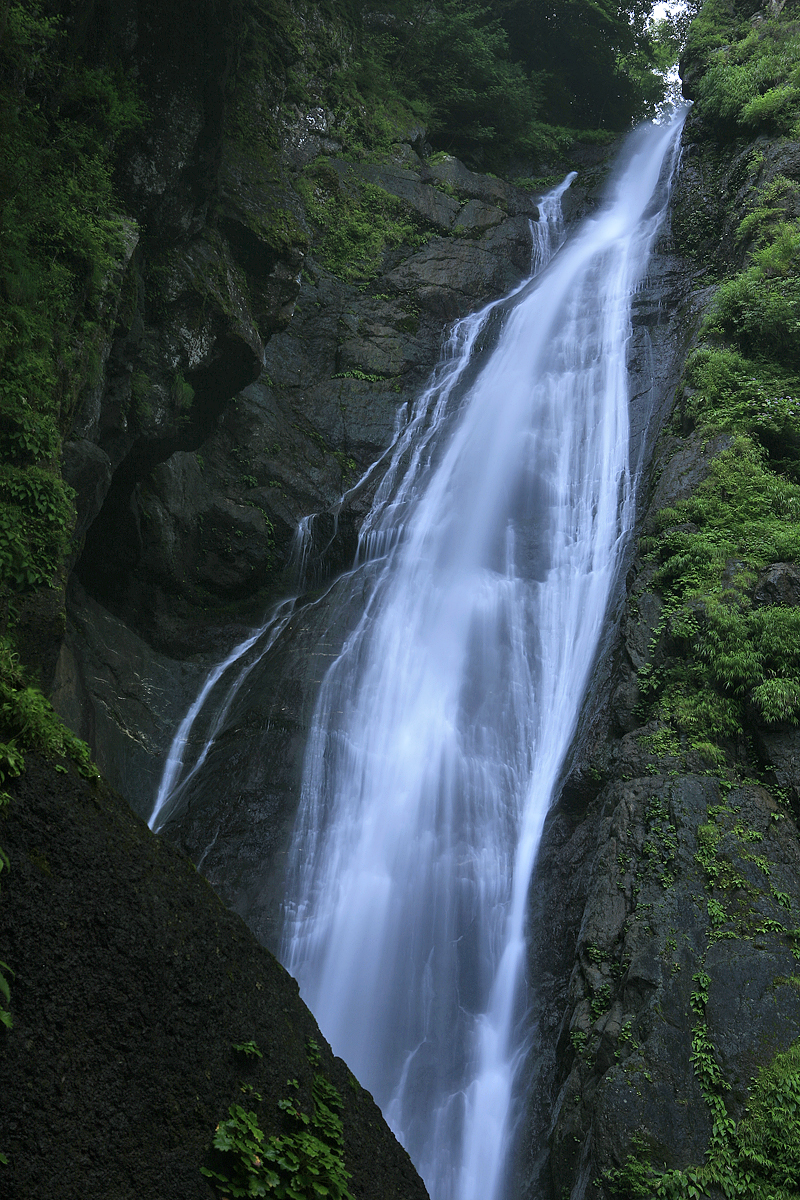
48. Abe Great Falls

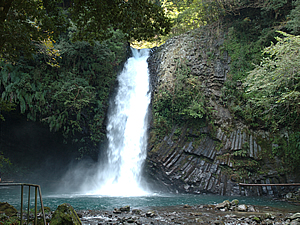
49. Jōren Falls

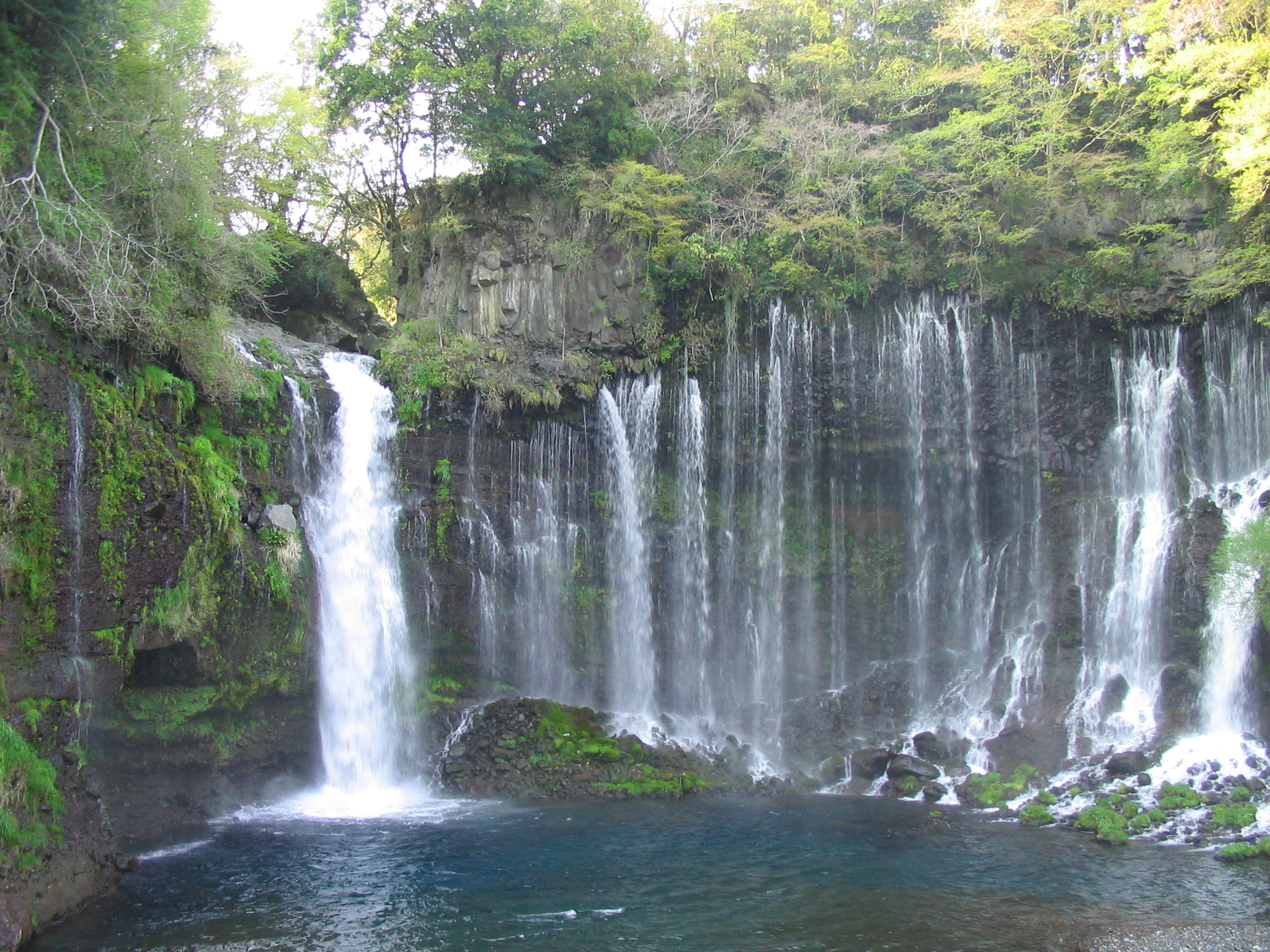
50. Shiraito Falls

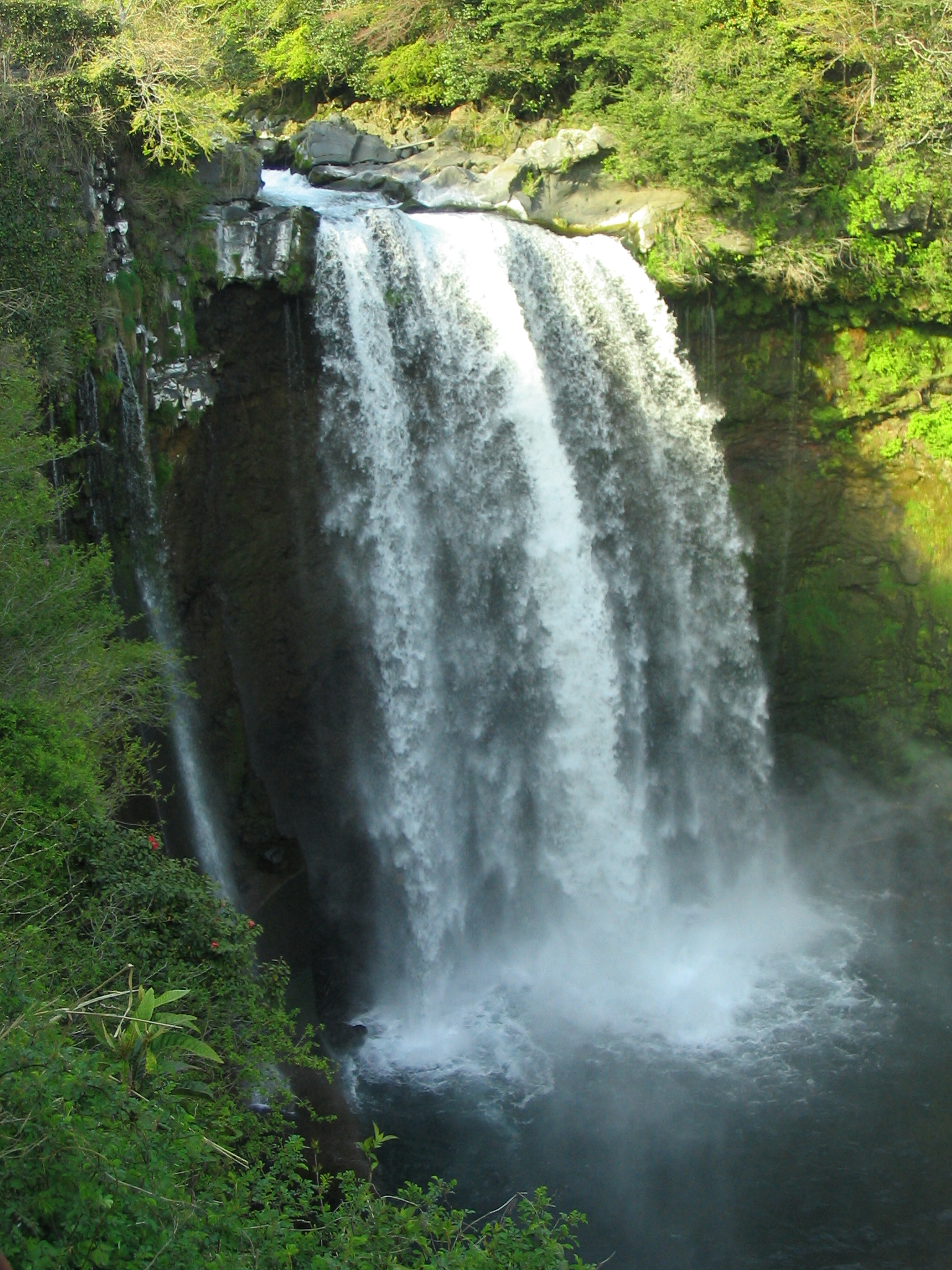
50. Otodome Falls

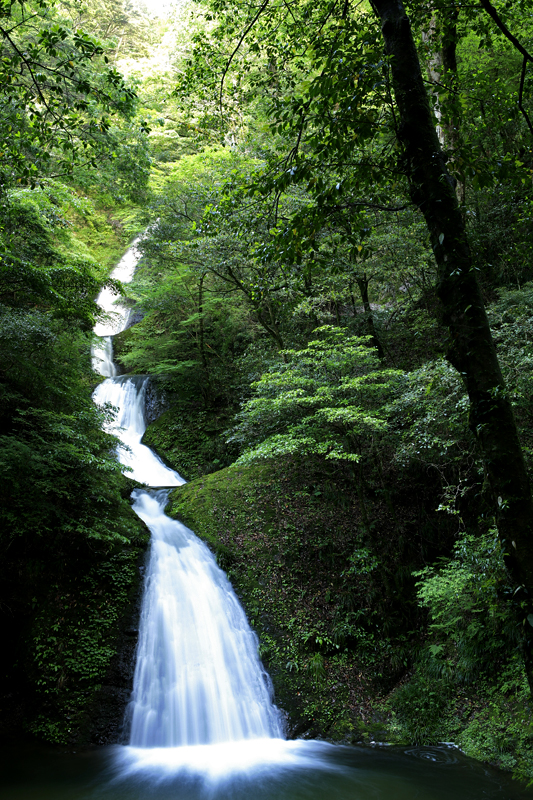
51. Atera Seven Falls

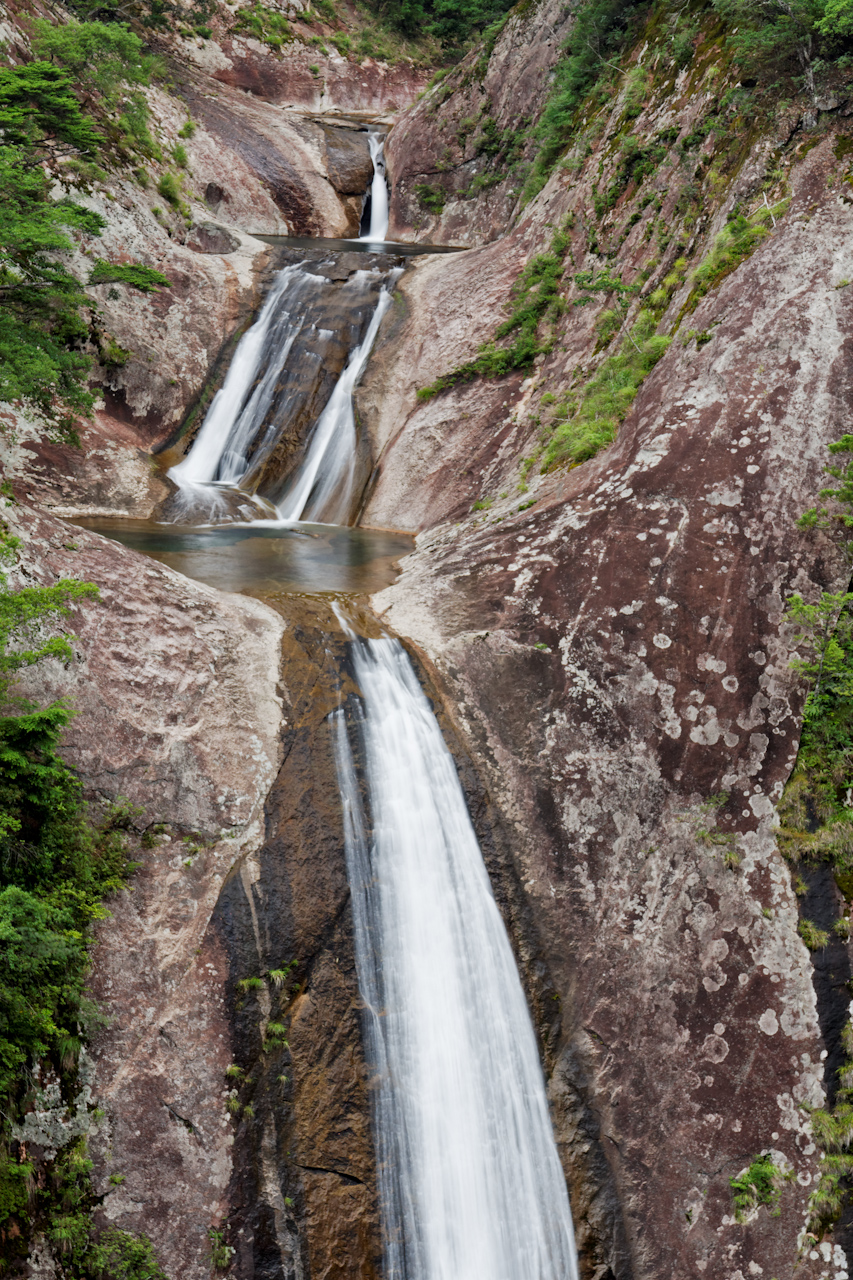
52. Nunobiki Falls

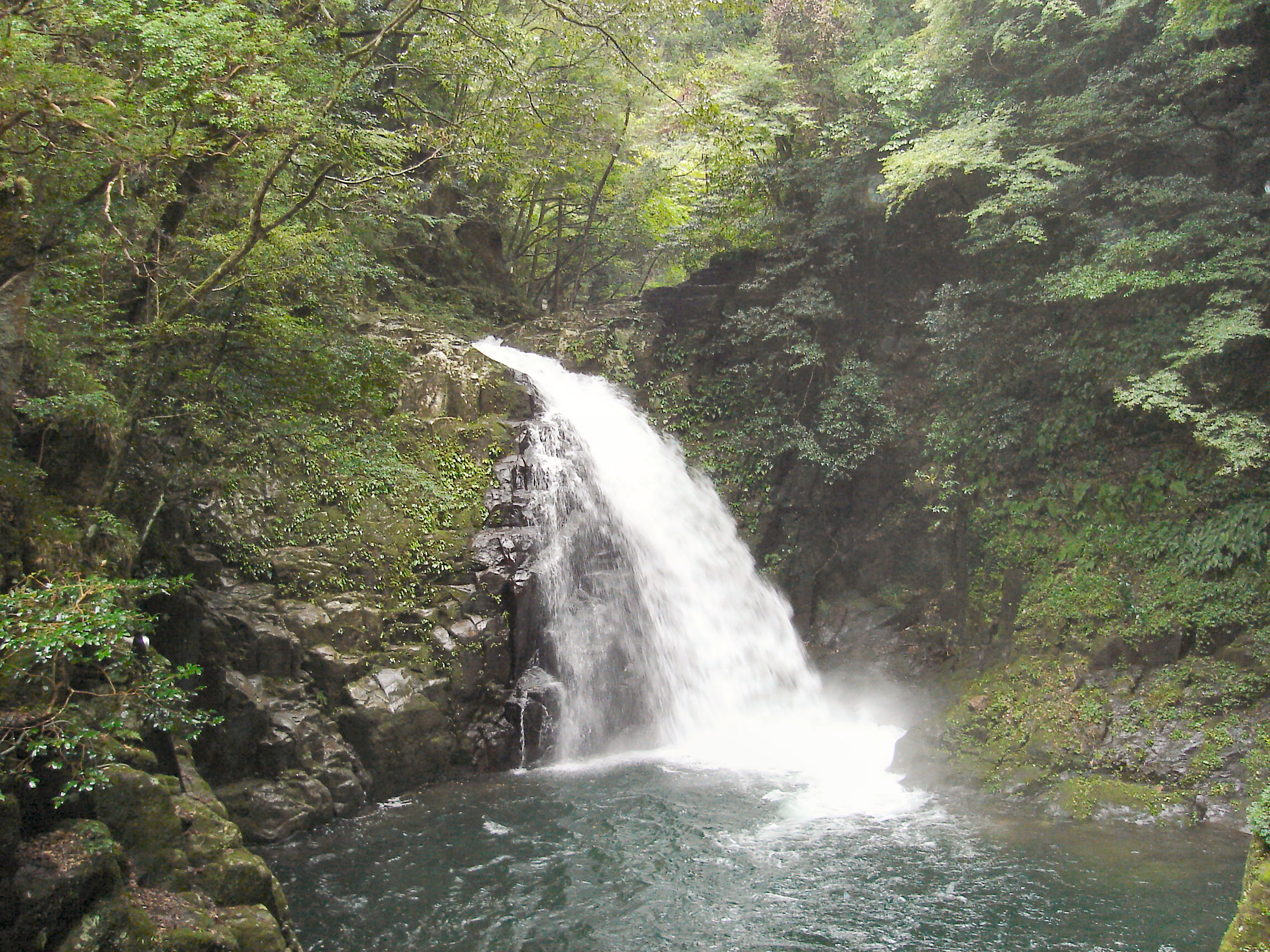
53. Akame Shijyūhachi Falls

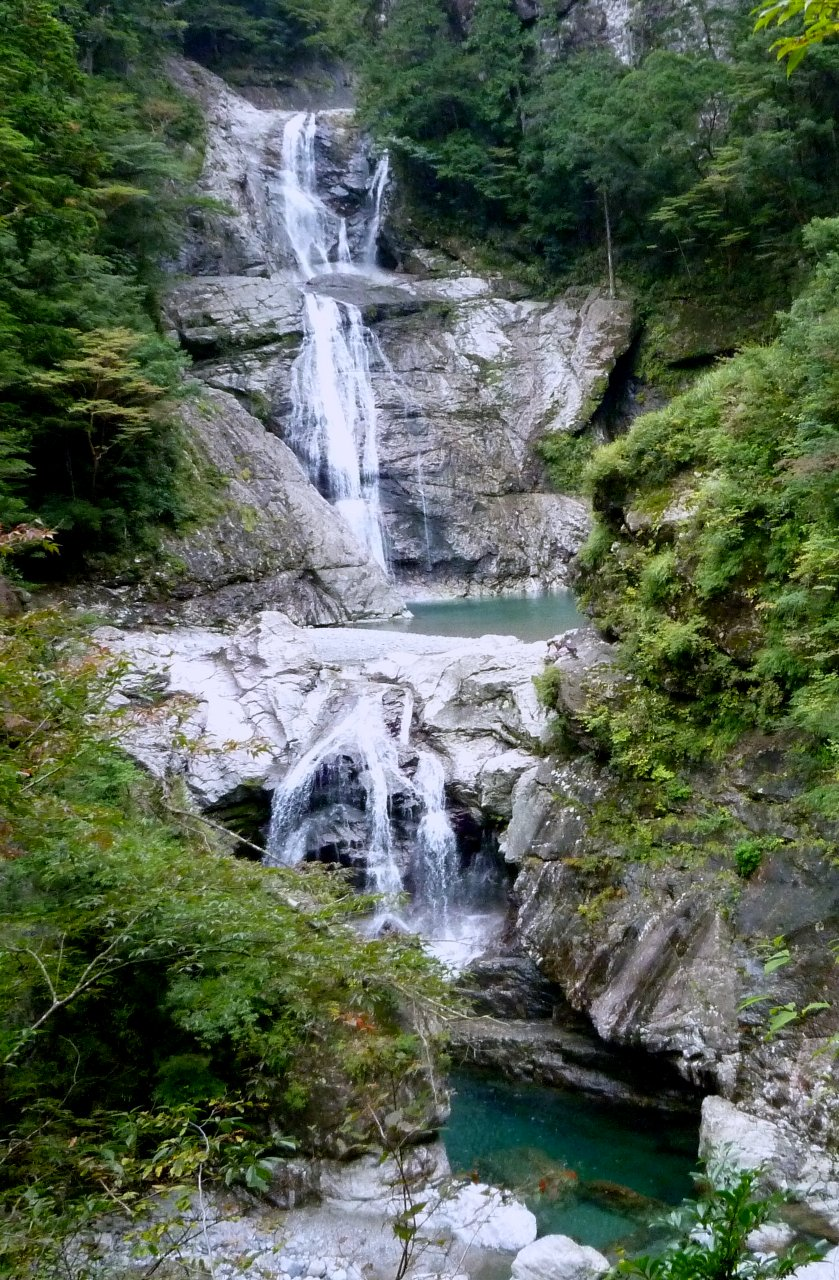
54. Nanatsukgama Falls

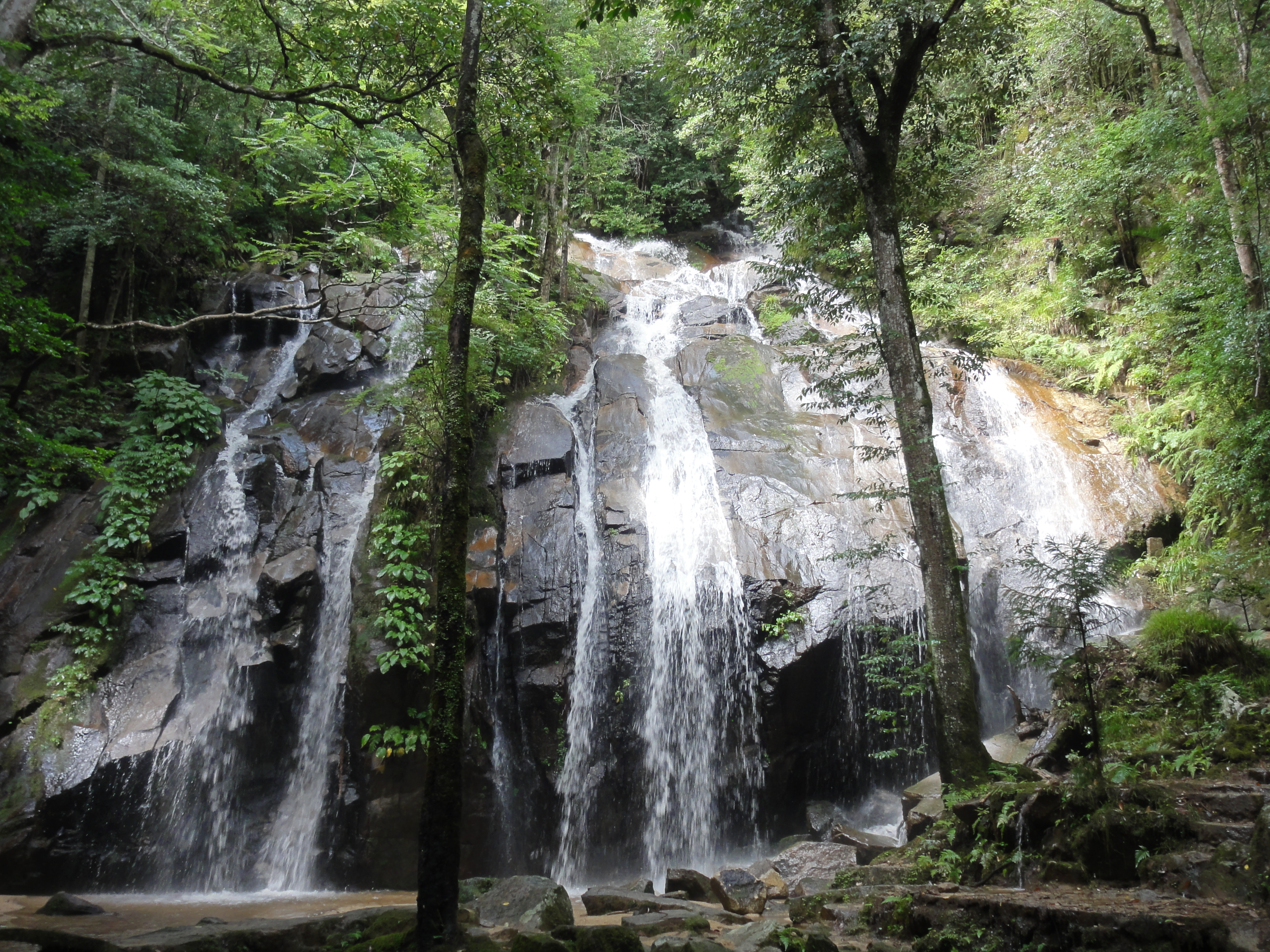
56. Kanabiki Falls

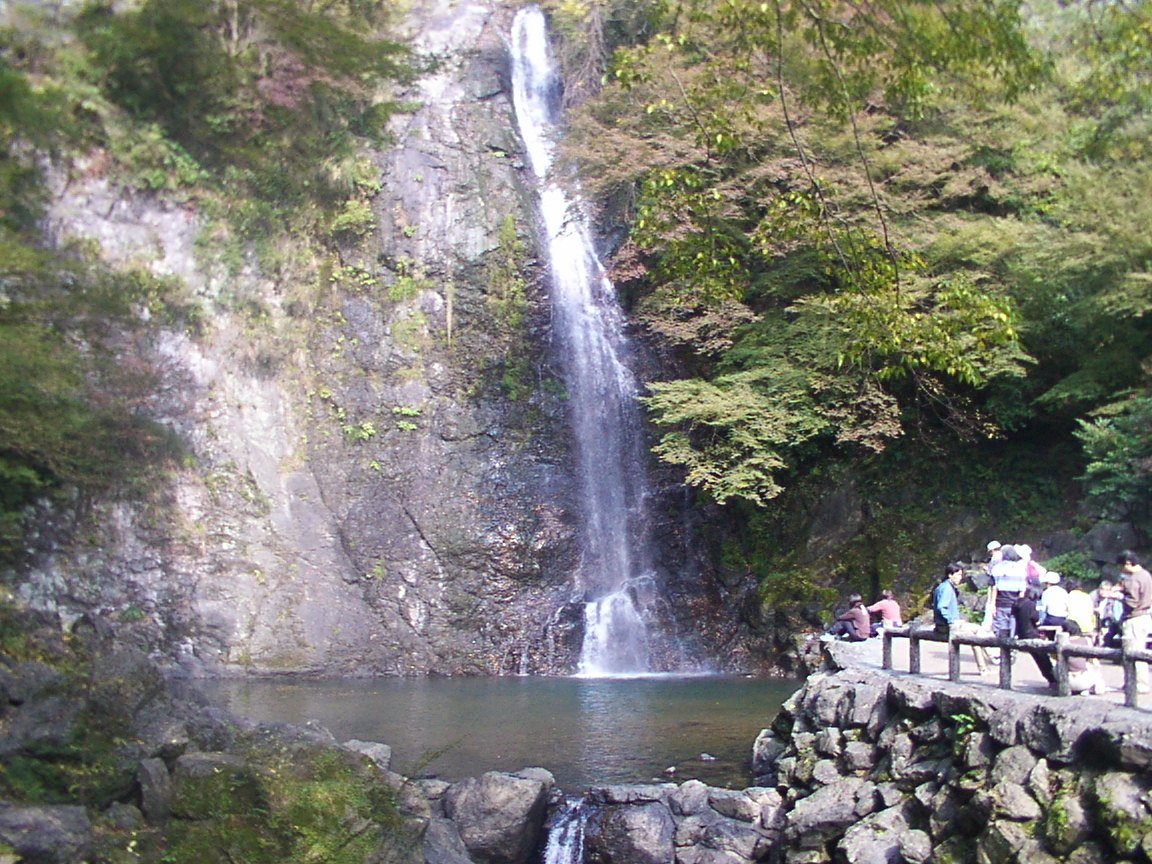
57. Minoo Falls

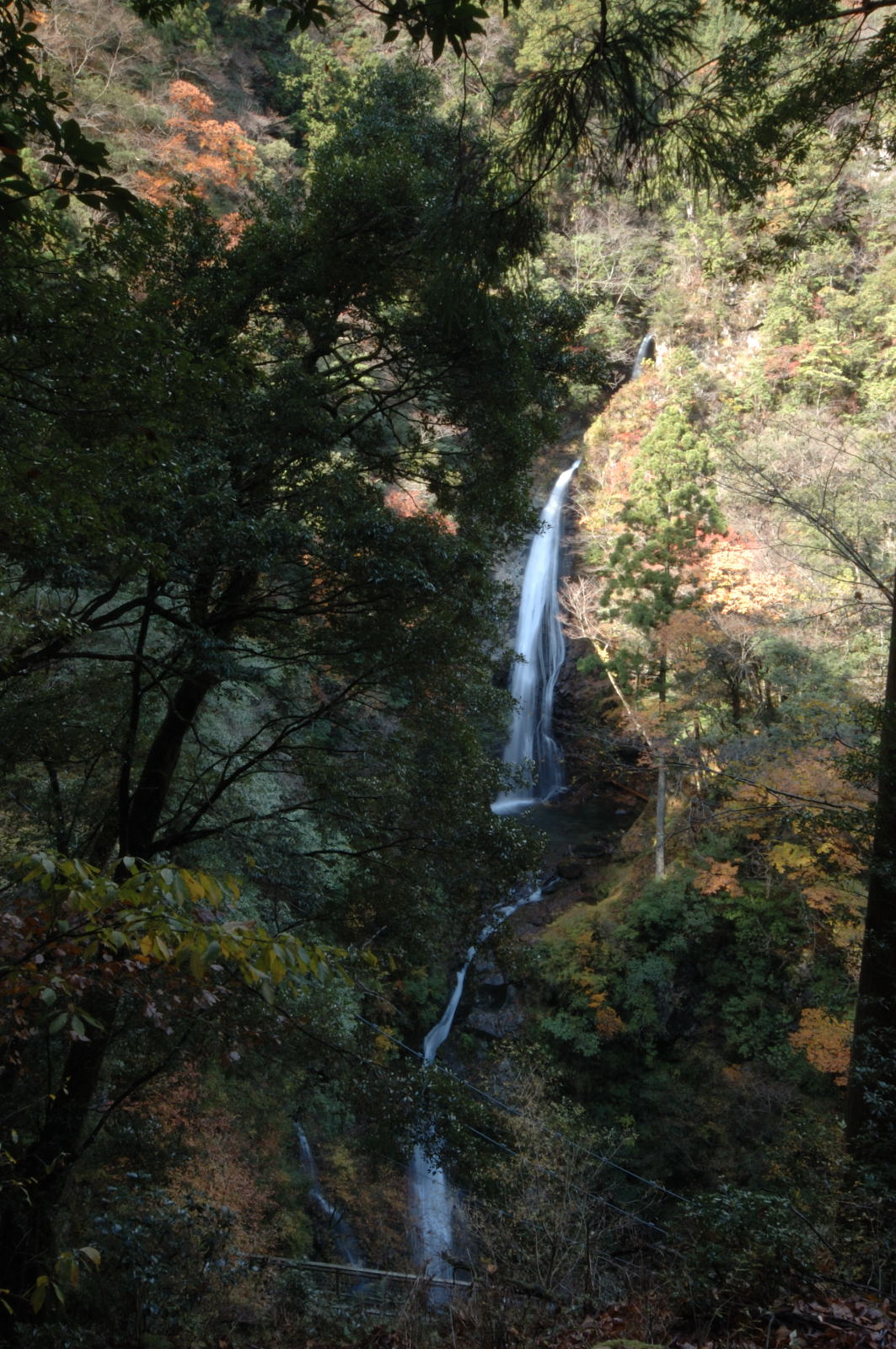
58. Harafudō Falls

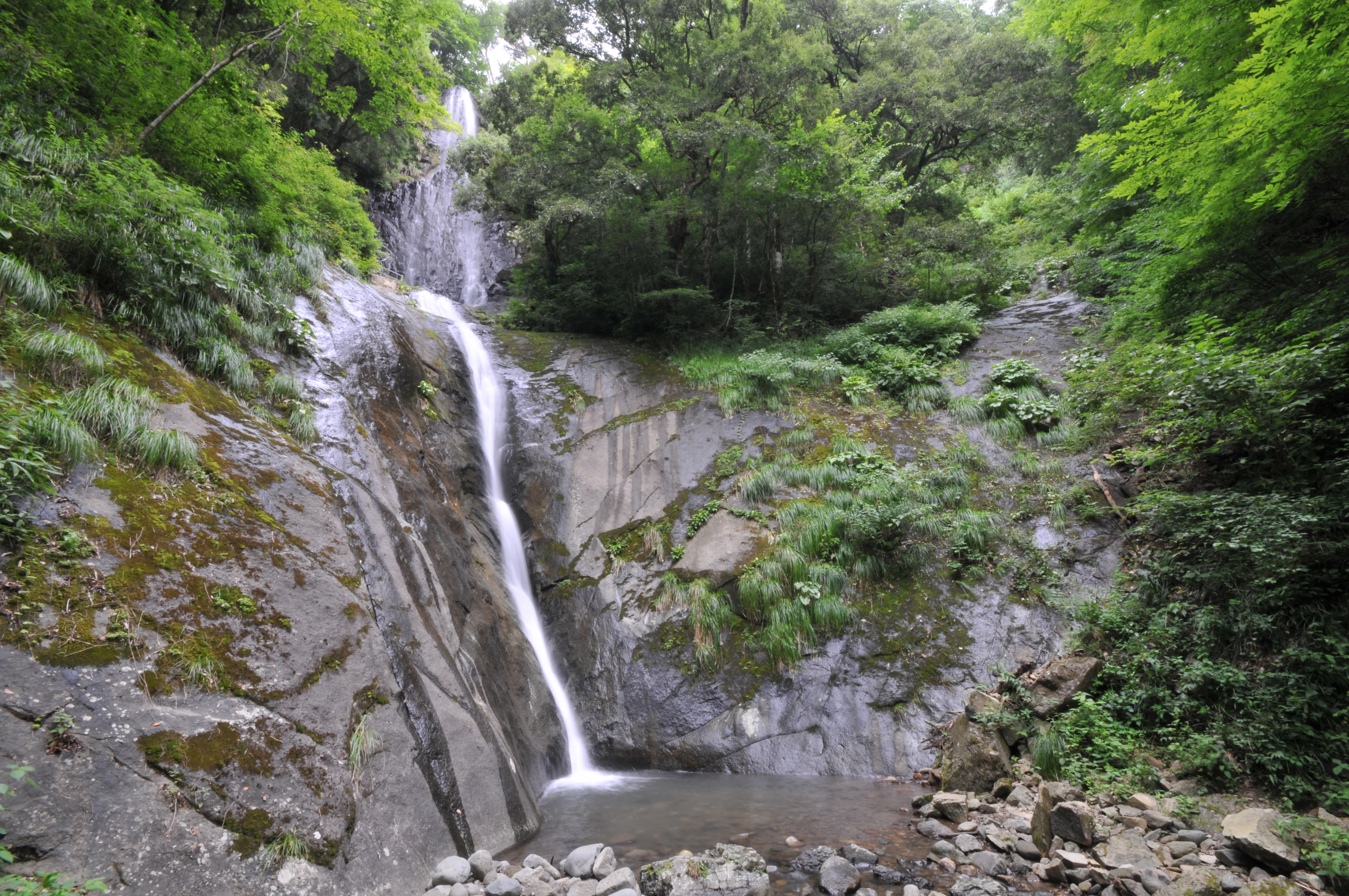
59. Saruo Falls

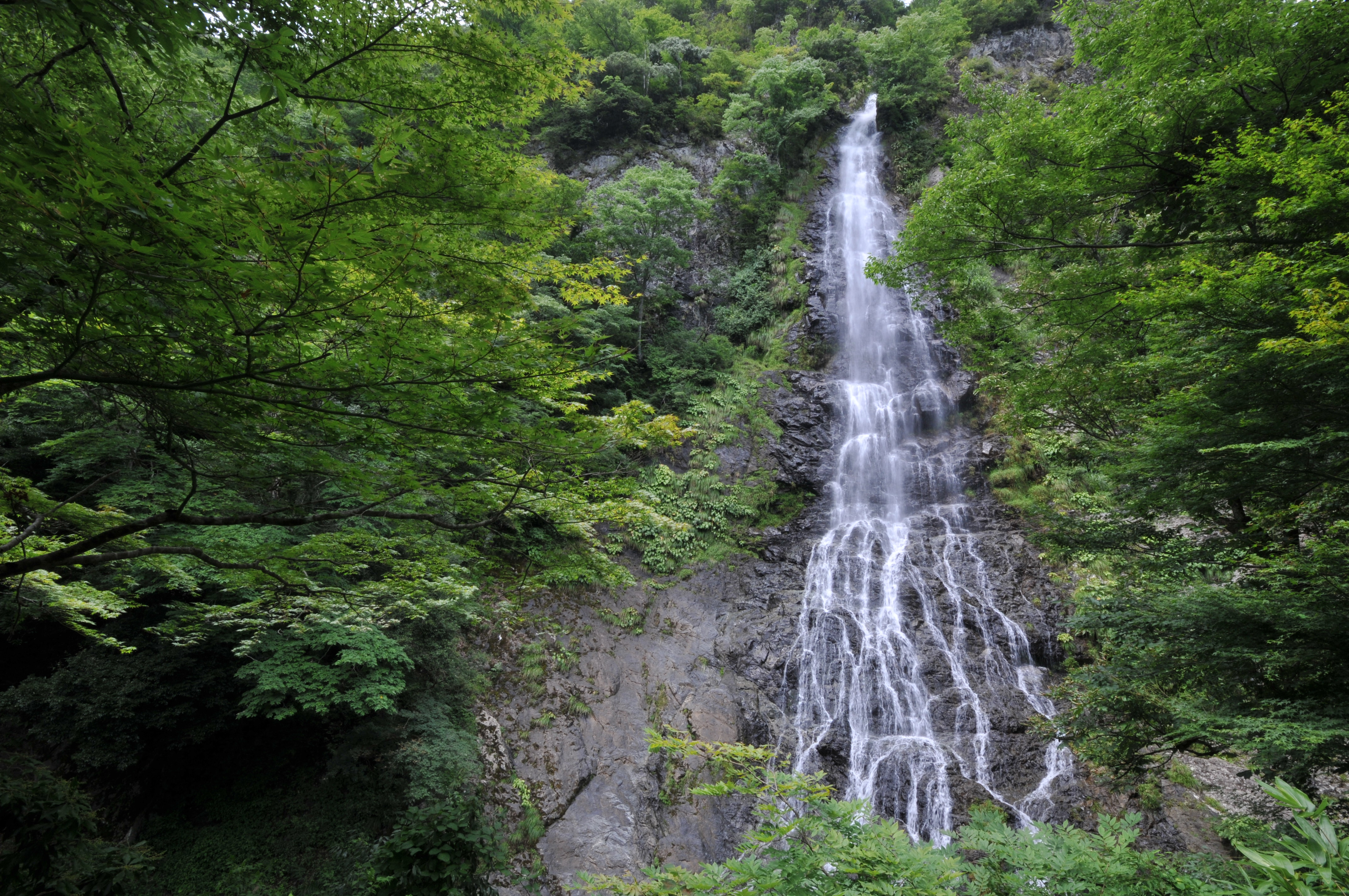
60. Tendaki Falls

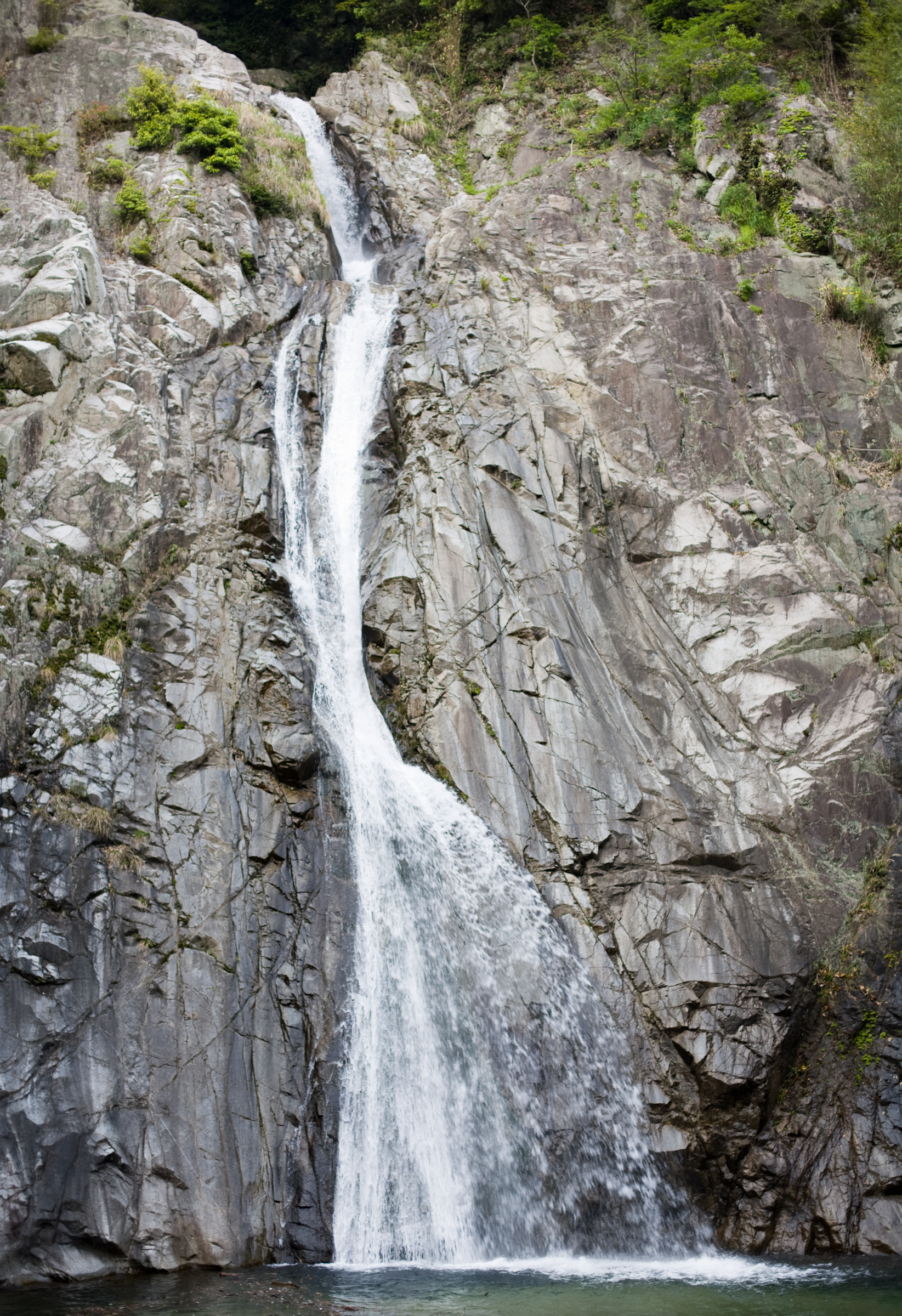
61. Nunobiki Falls

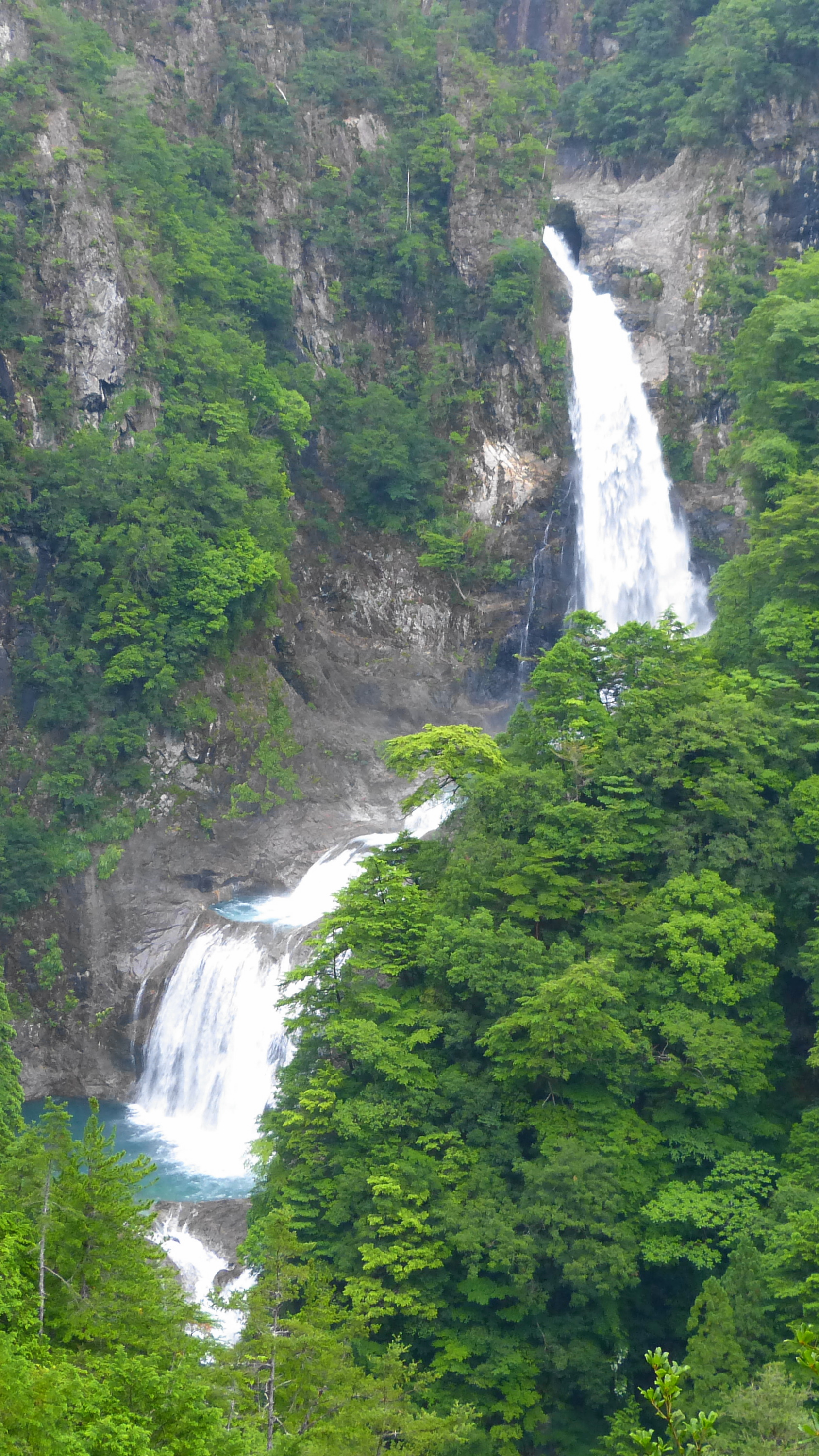
63. Fudōnanae Falls

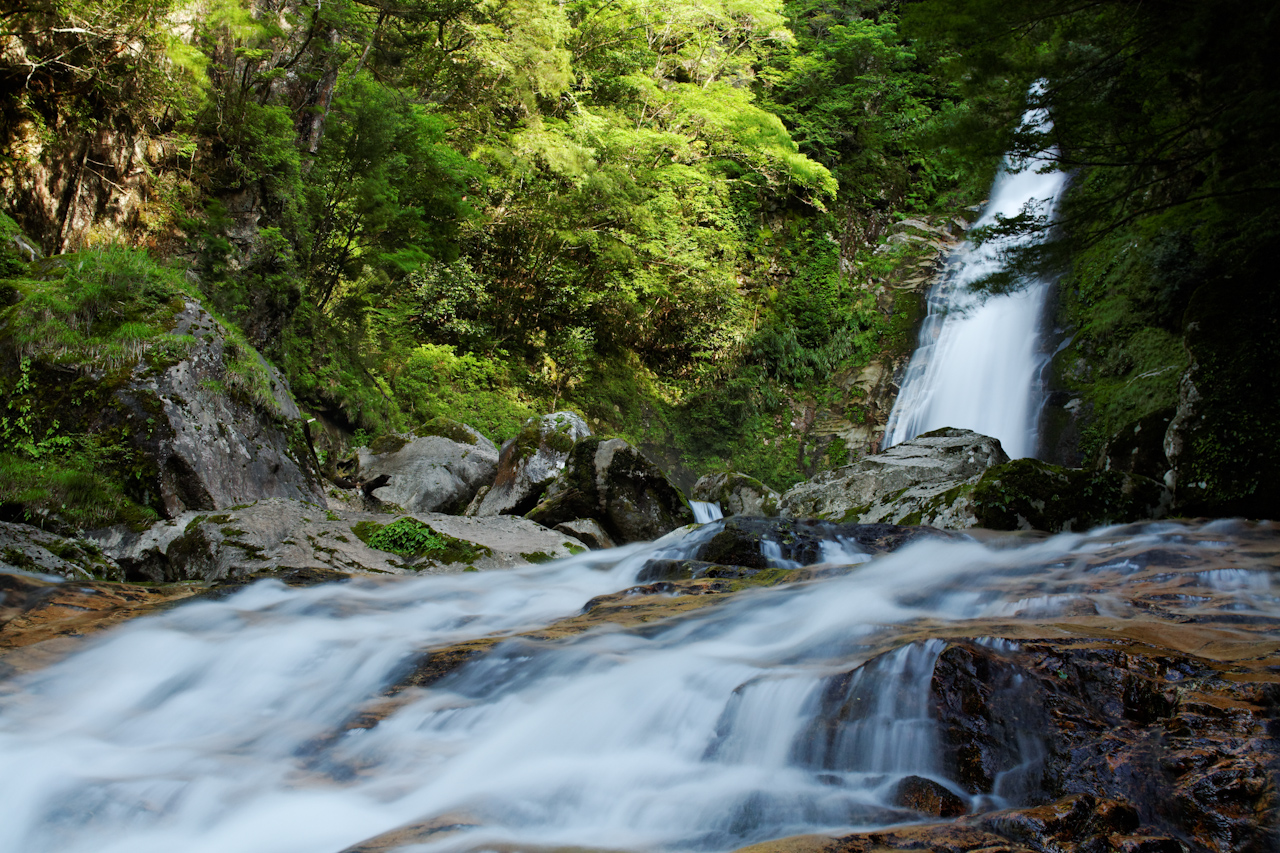
64. Sasa Falls

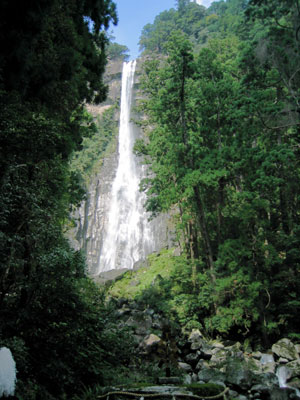
66. Nachi Falls

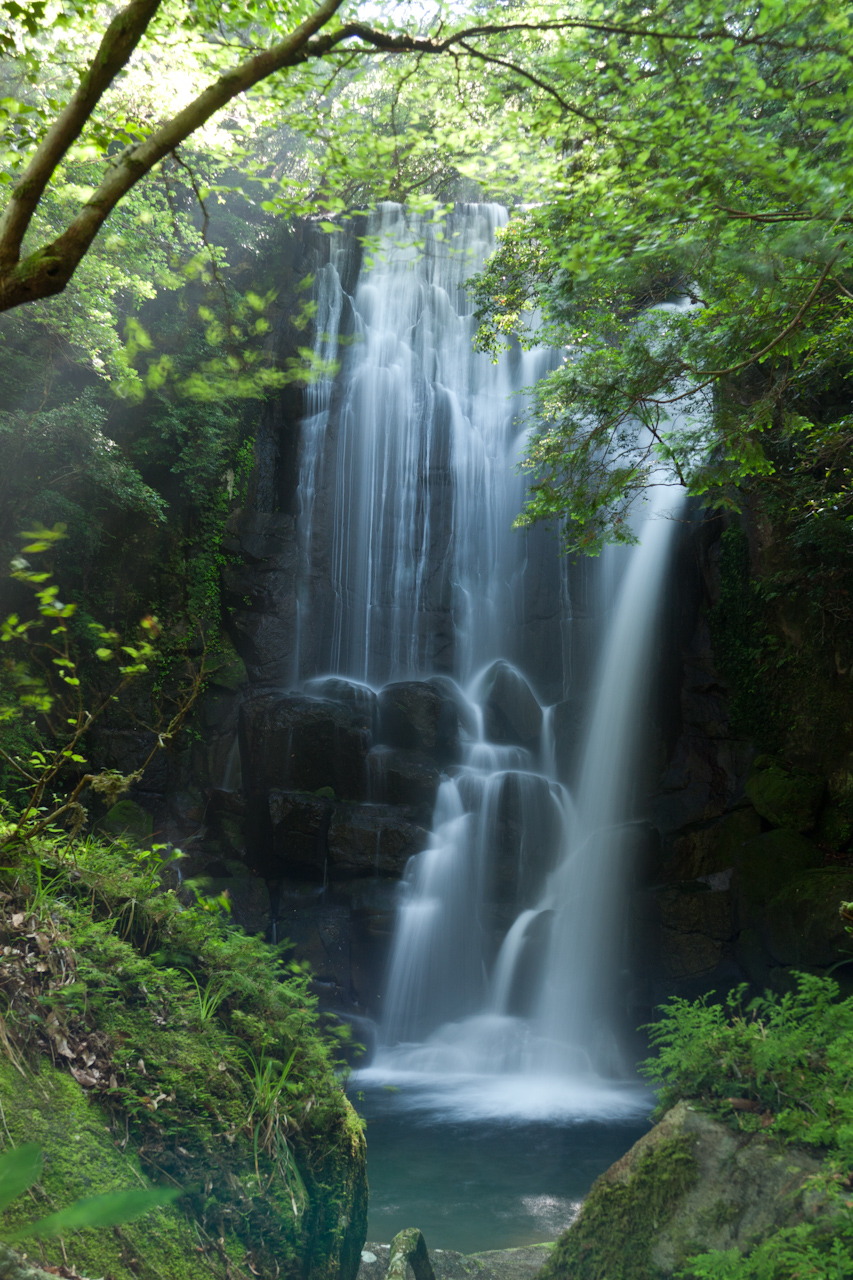
67. Kuwanoki Falls

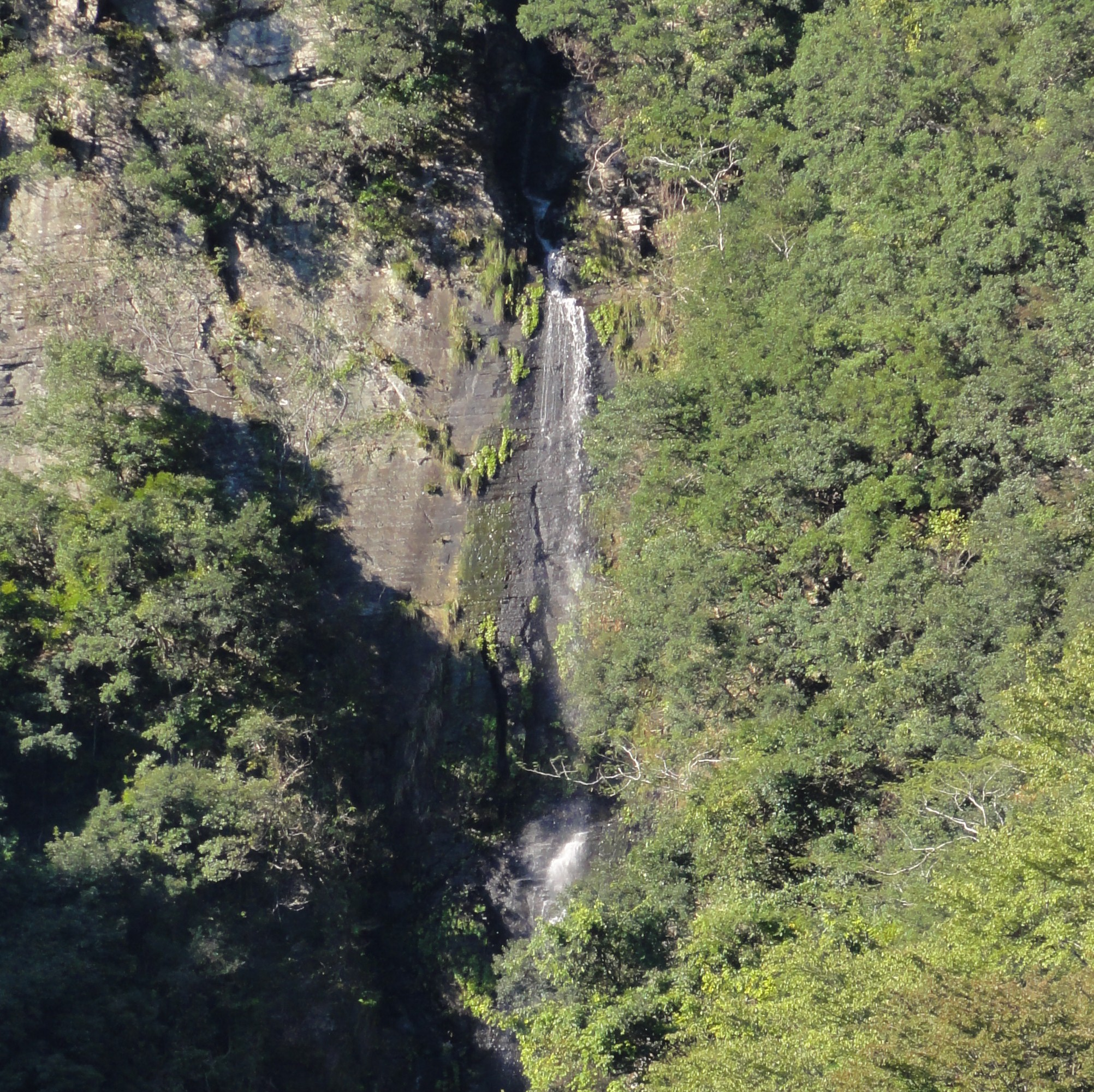
68. Haso Falls

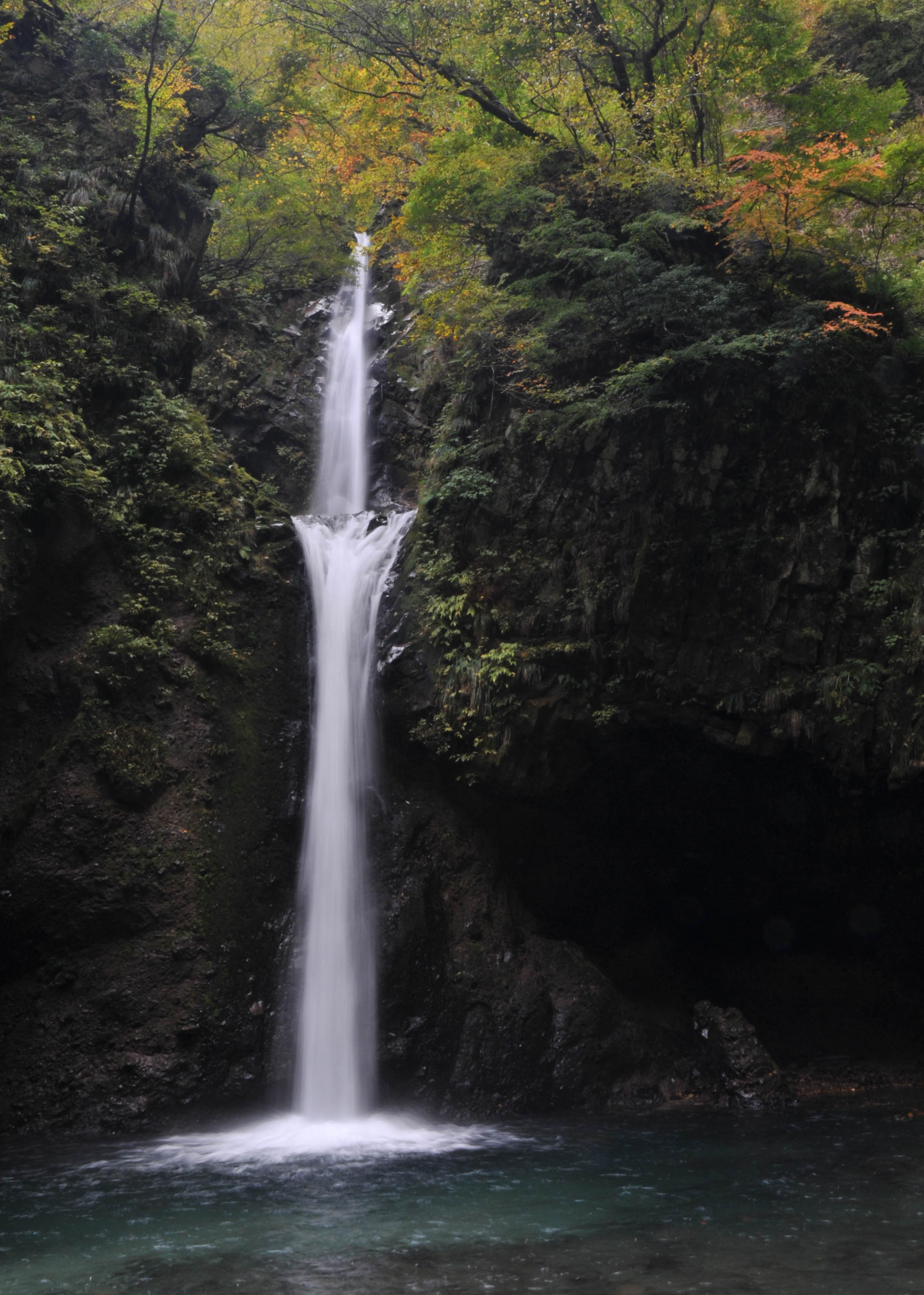
69. Daisen Fall

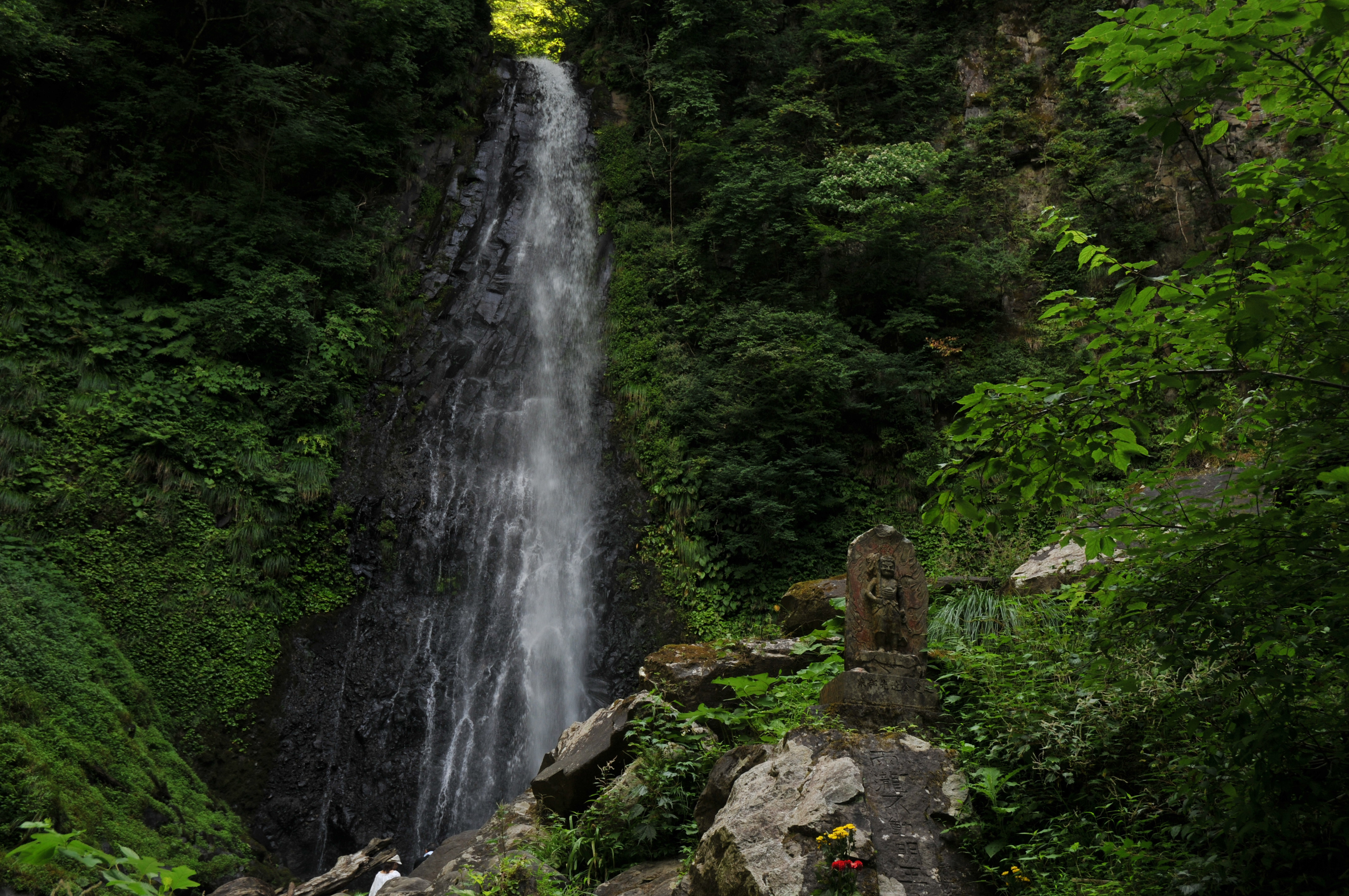
70. Amedaki Falls

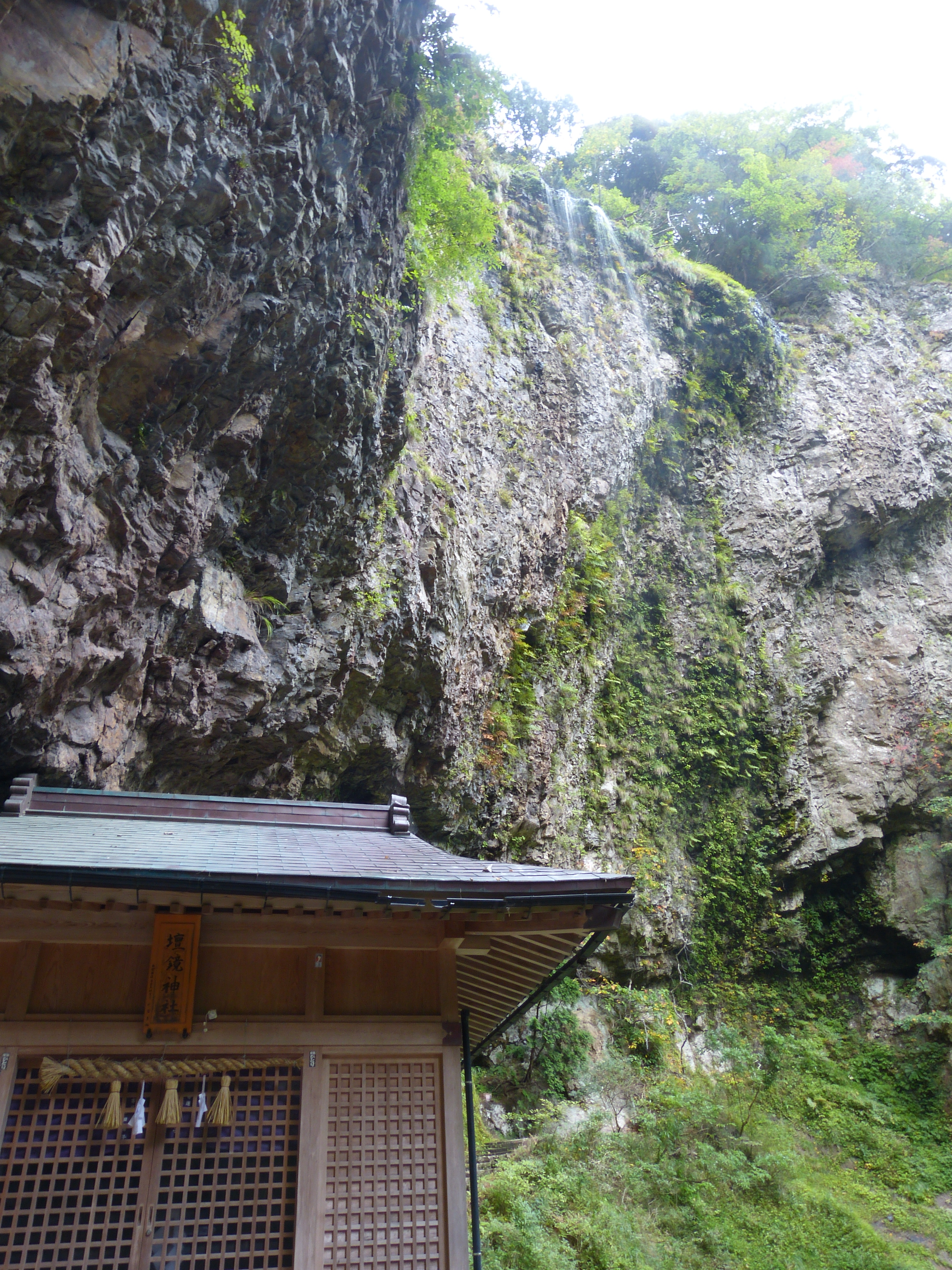
71. Dangyō Falls

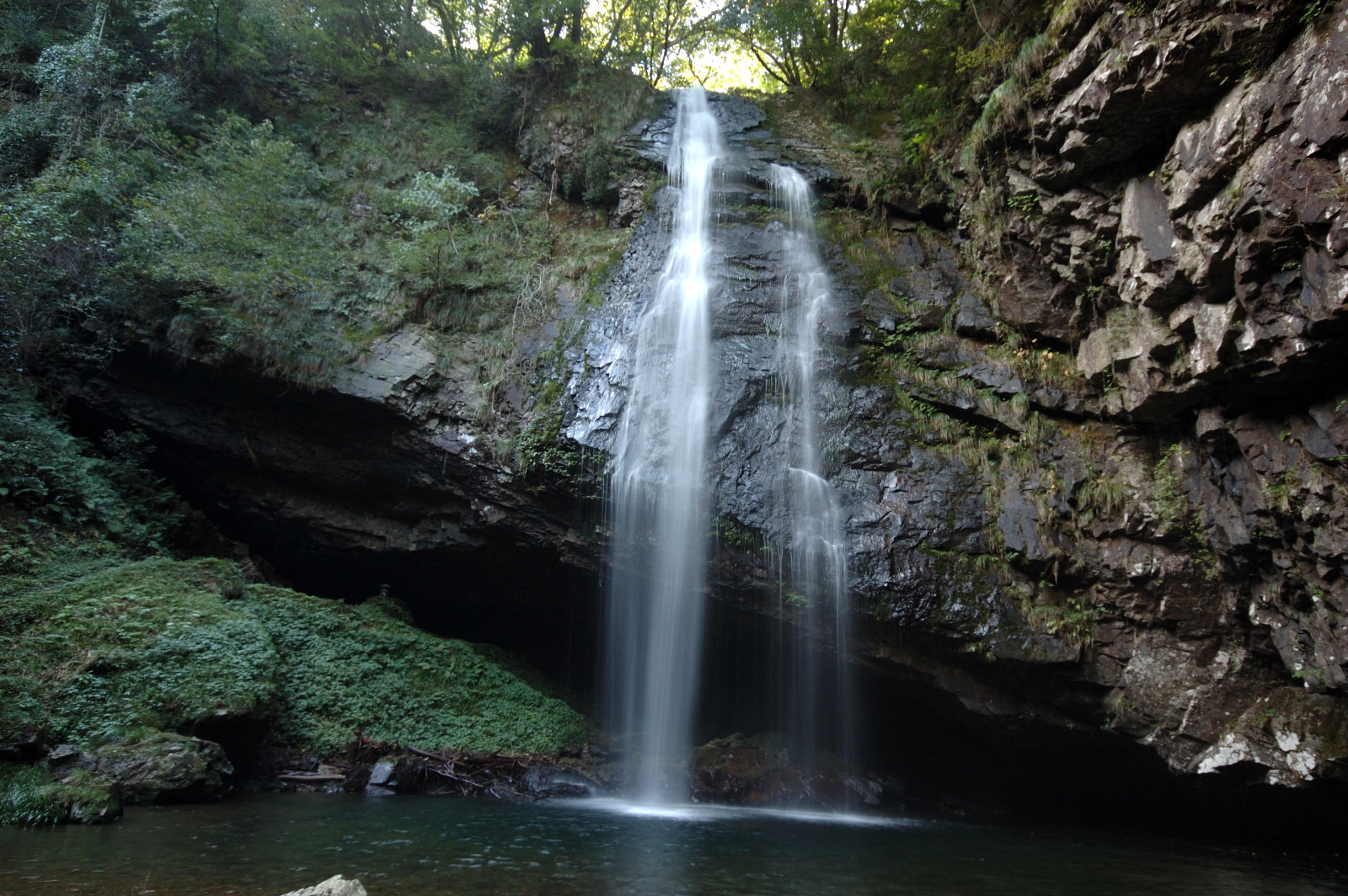
72. Ryūzuyae Falls

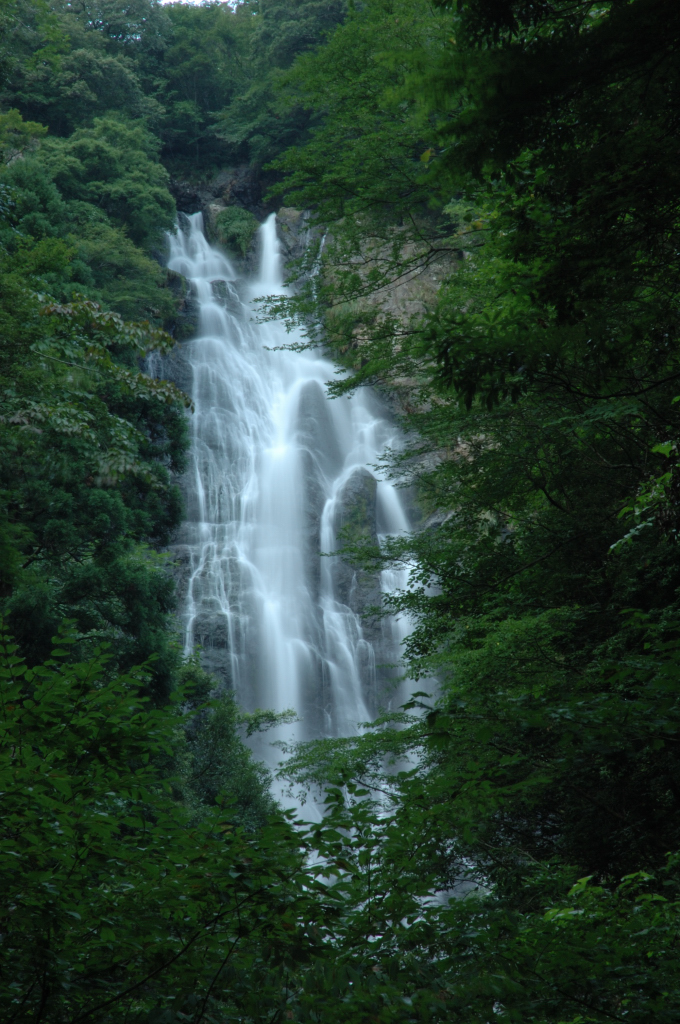
73. Kanba Falls

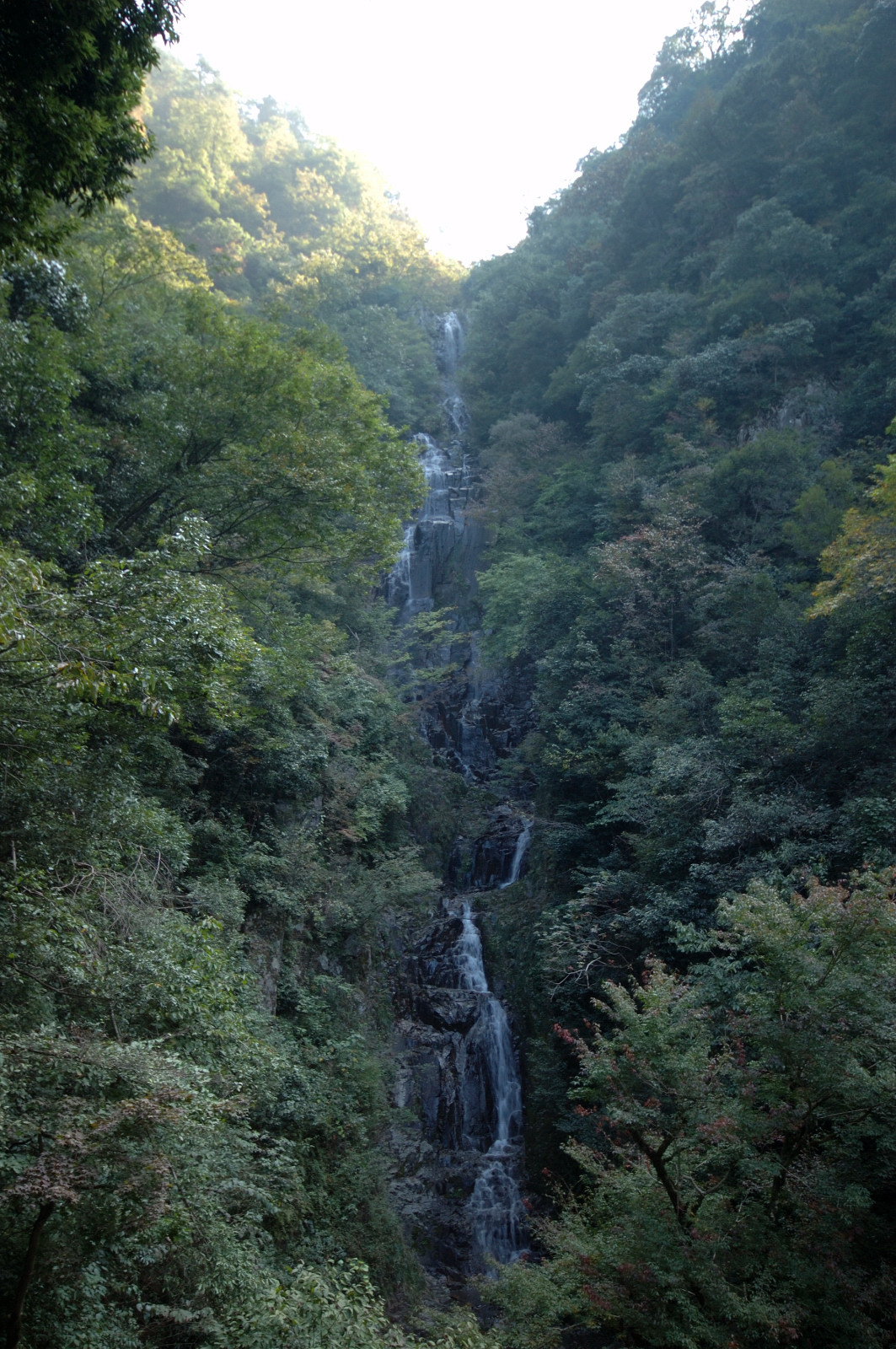
74. Jōsei Falls

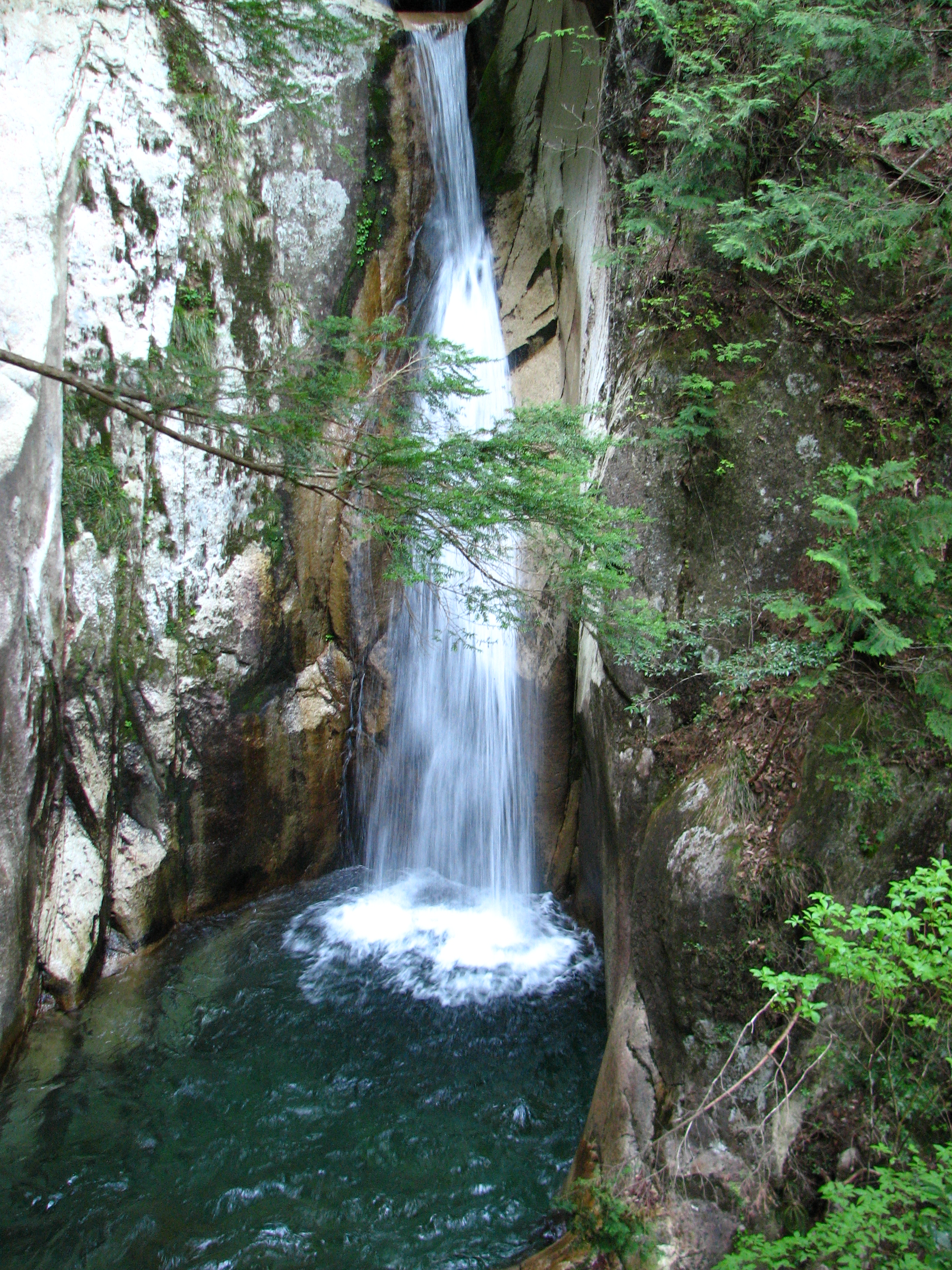
75. Jakuchikyō Goryū Falls

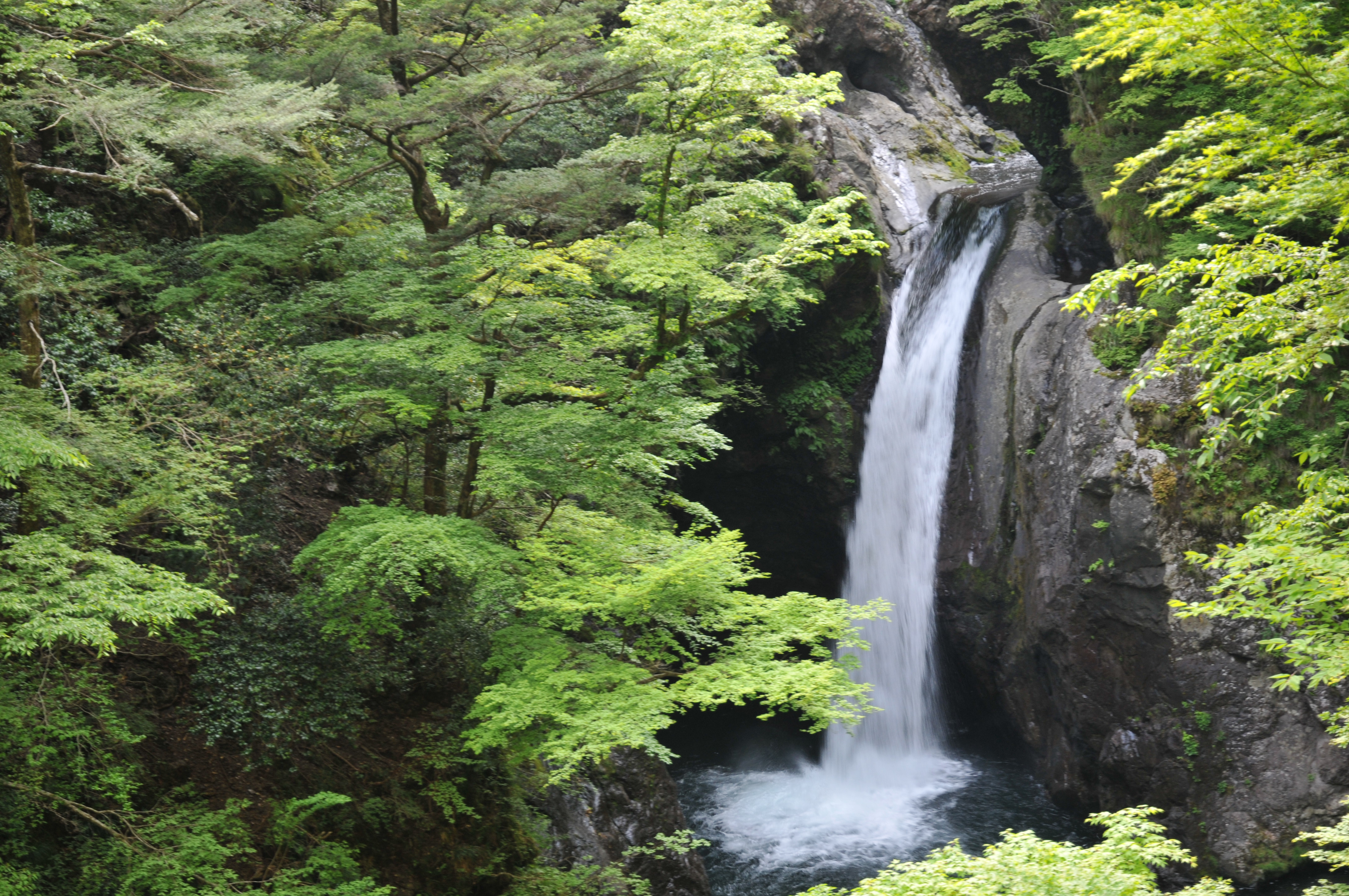
76. Ōgama Falls

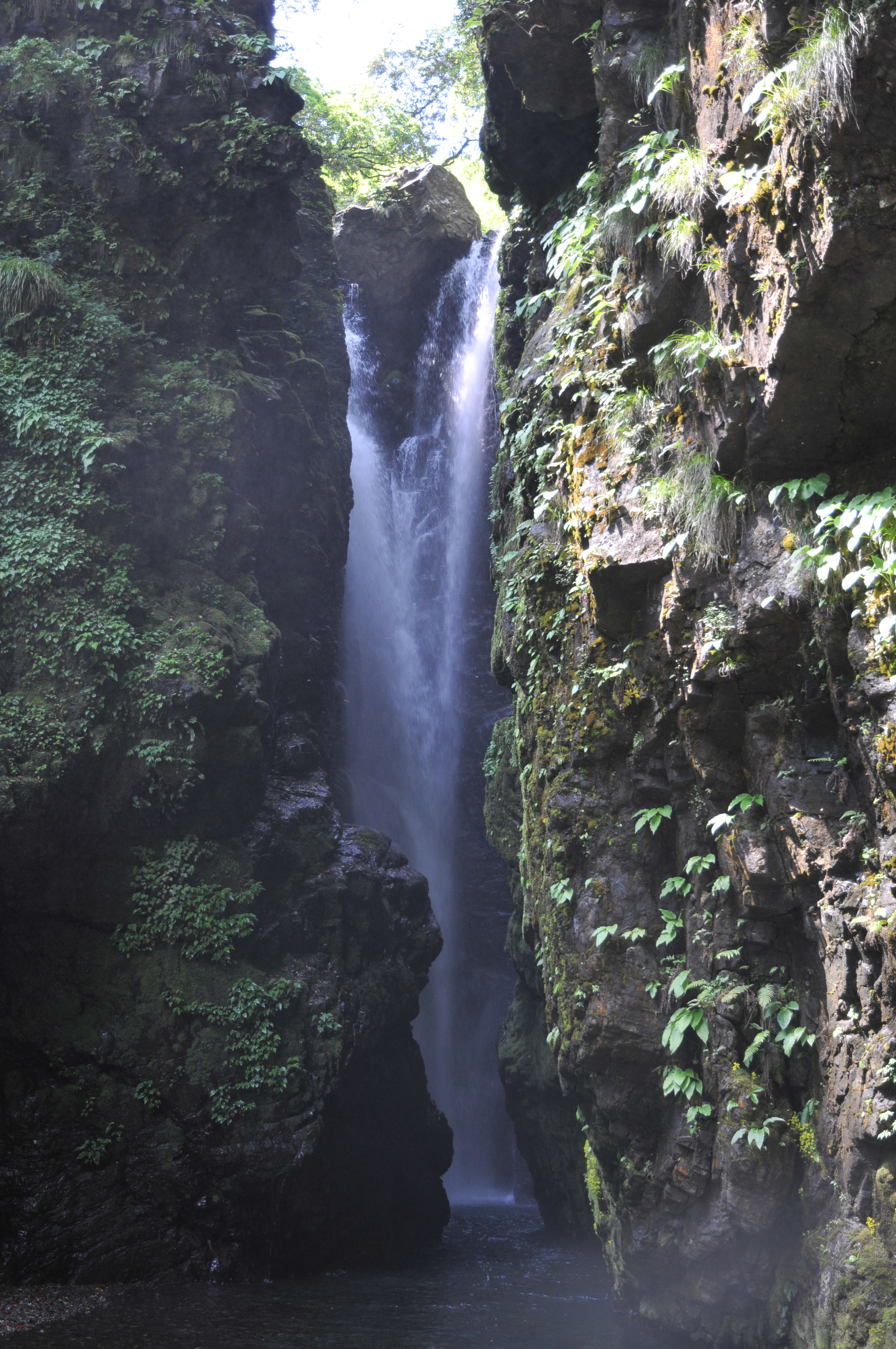
77. Todoroki Kujyūku Falls

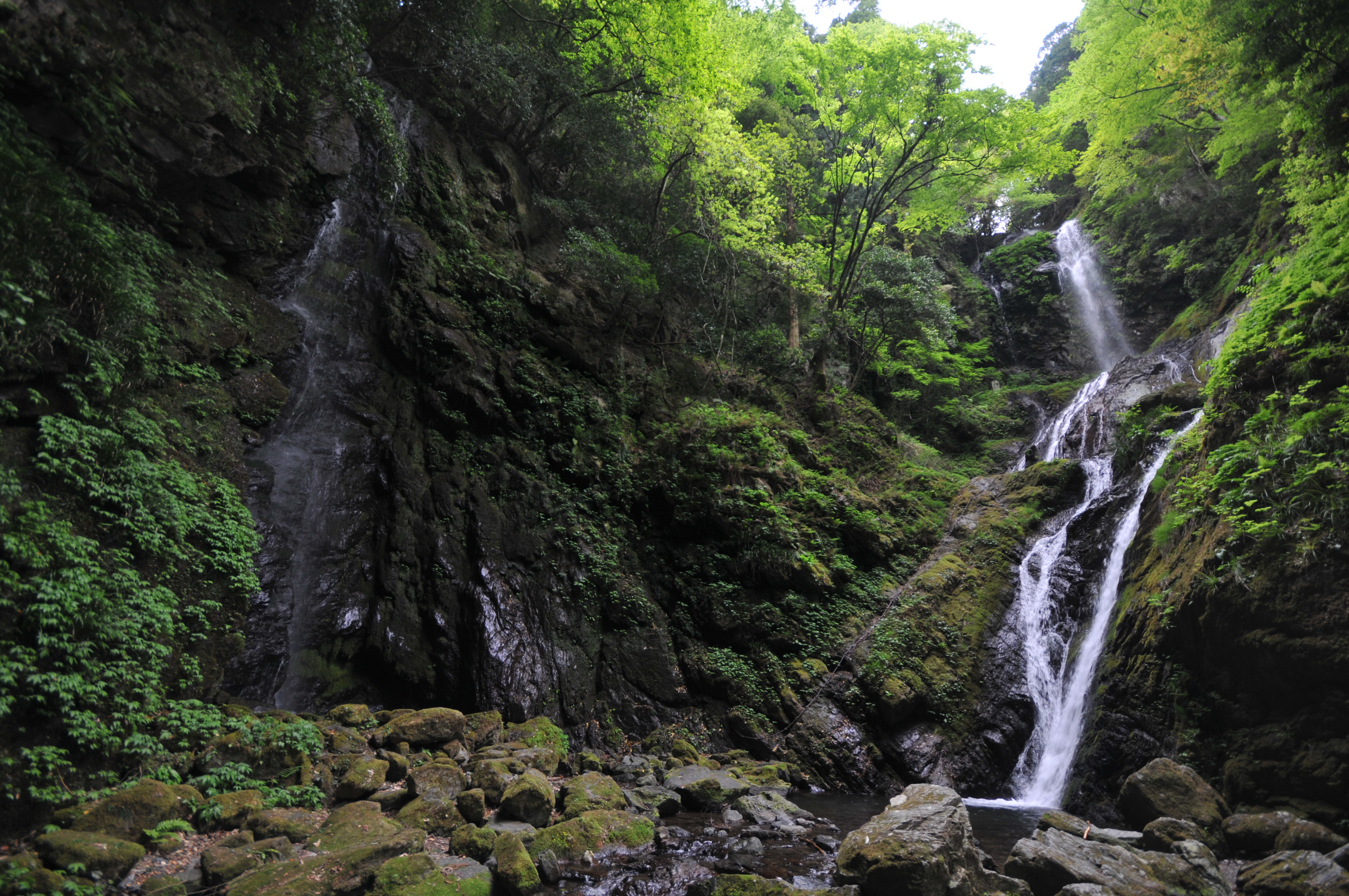
78. Amagoi Falls

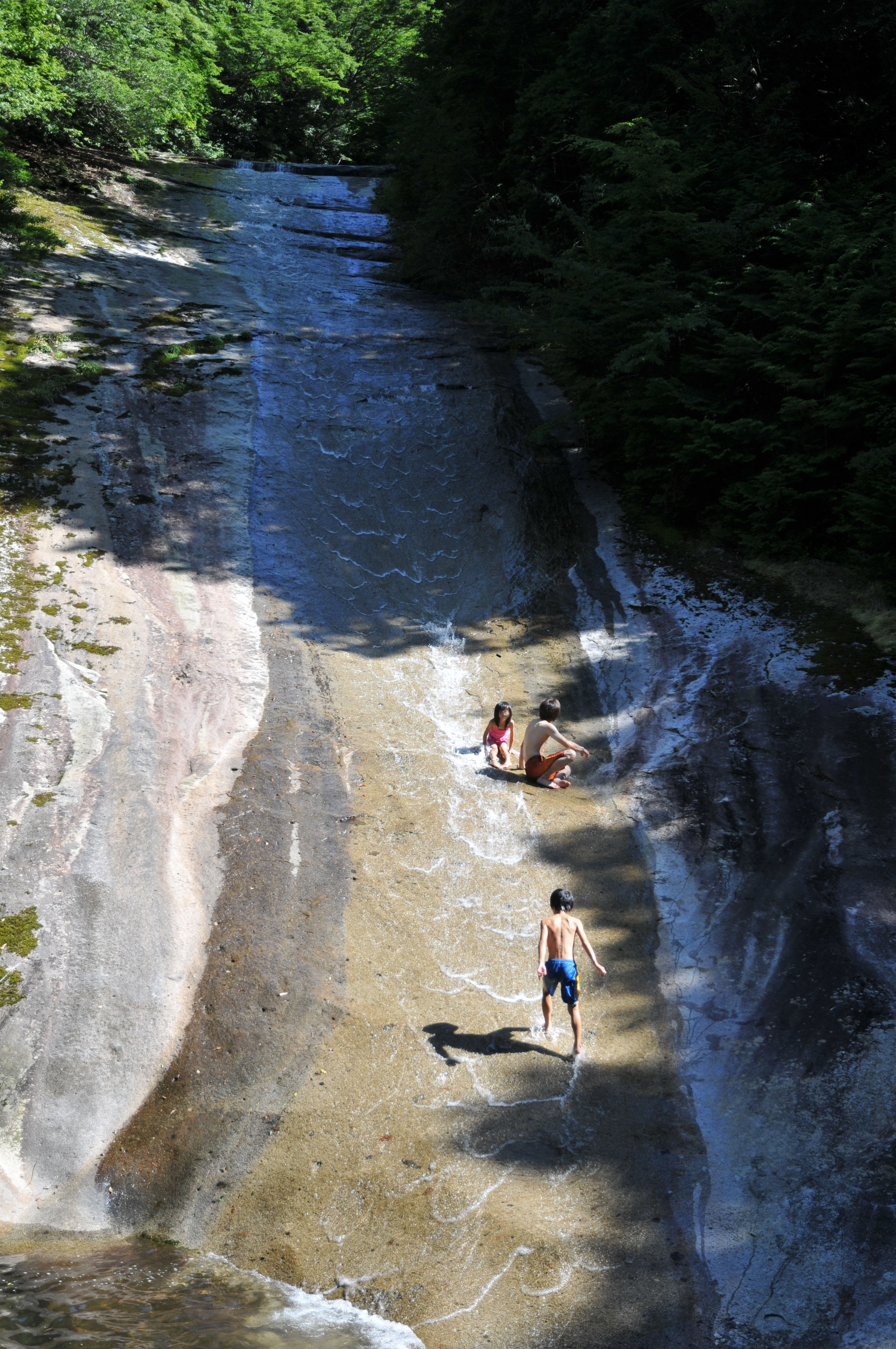
79. Yukiwa Falls

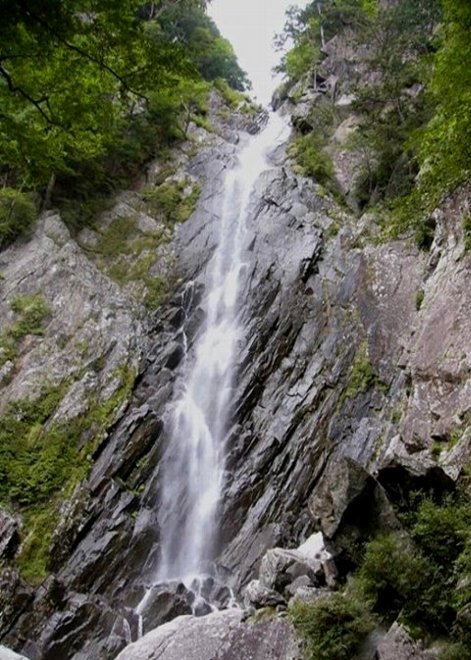
80. Goraikō Falls

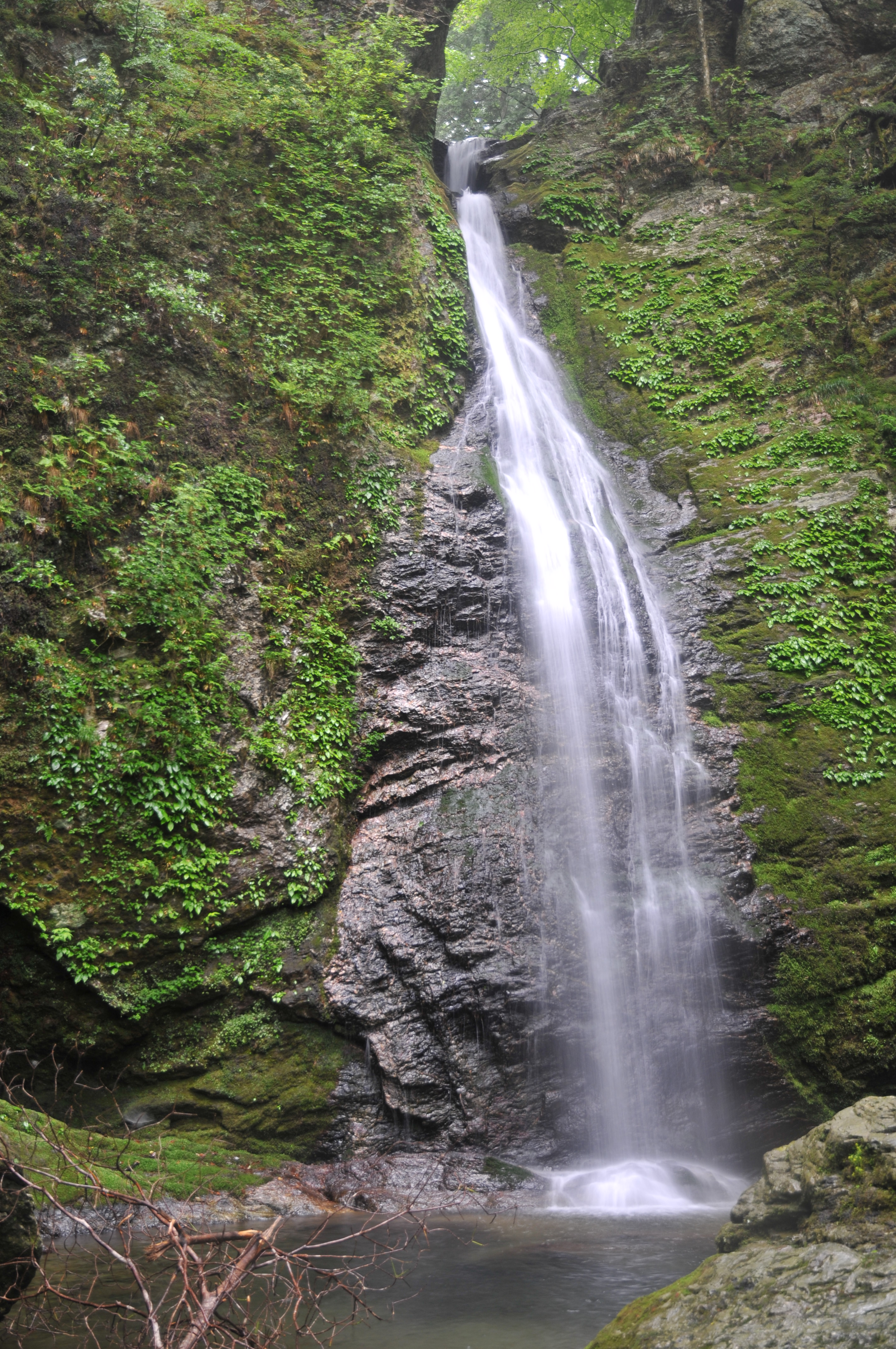
81. Ryūō Falls

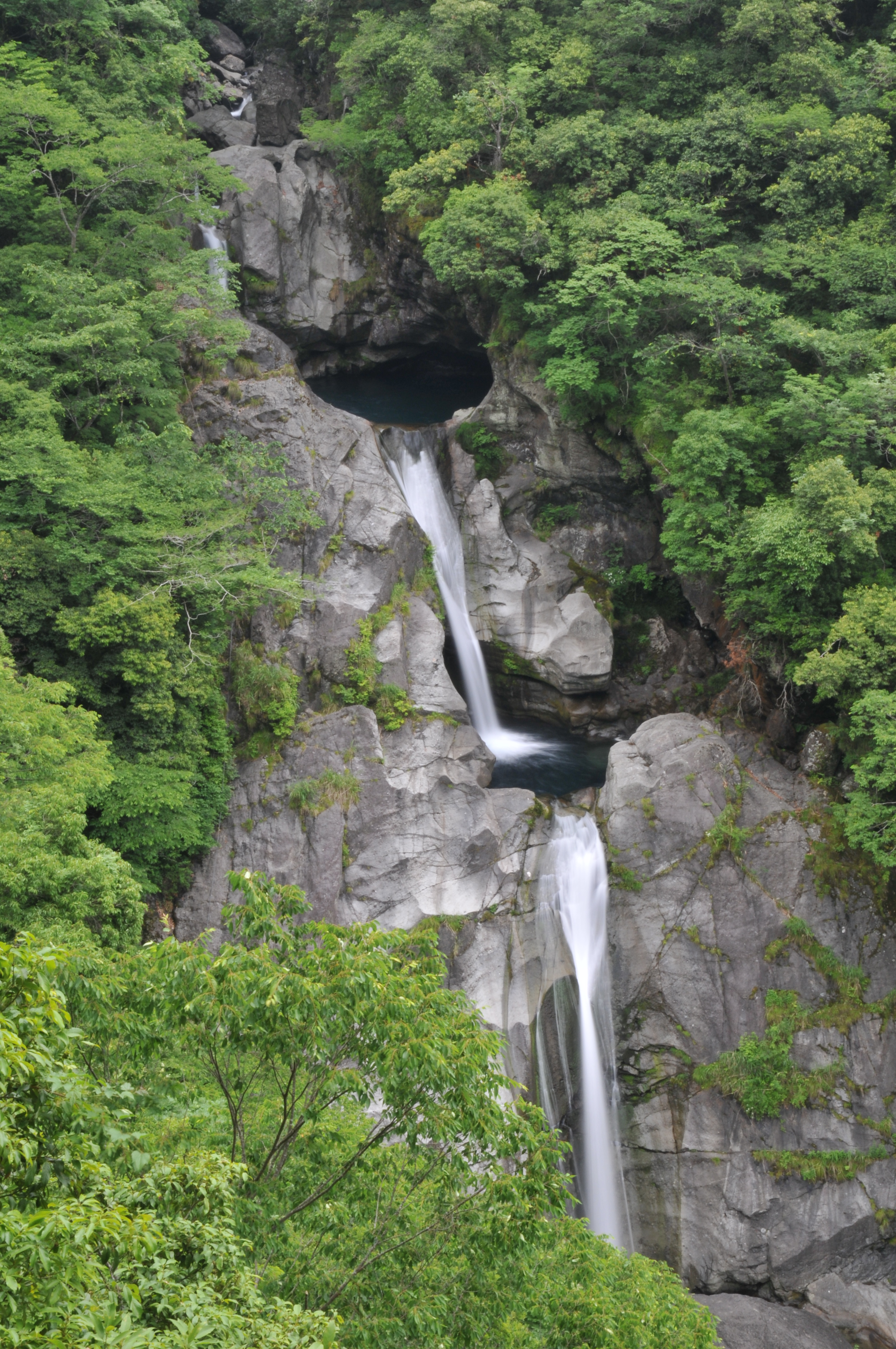
82. Todoro Falls

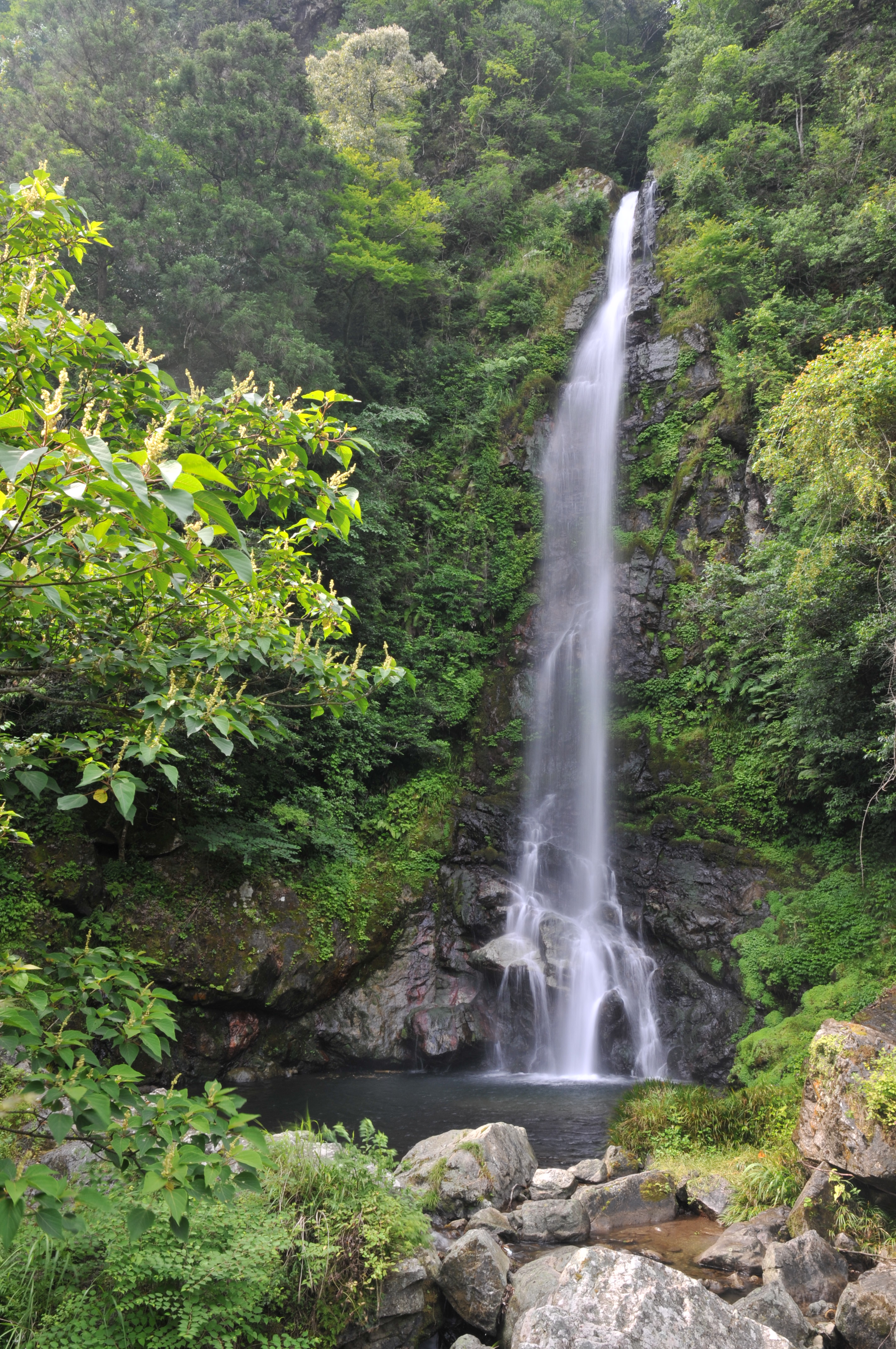
83. Ōtaru Falls

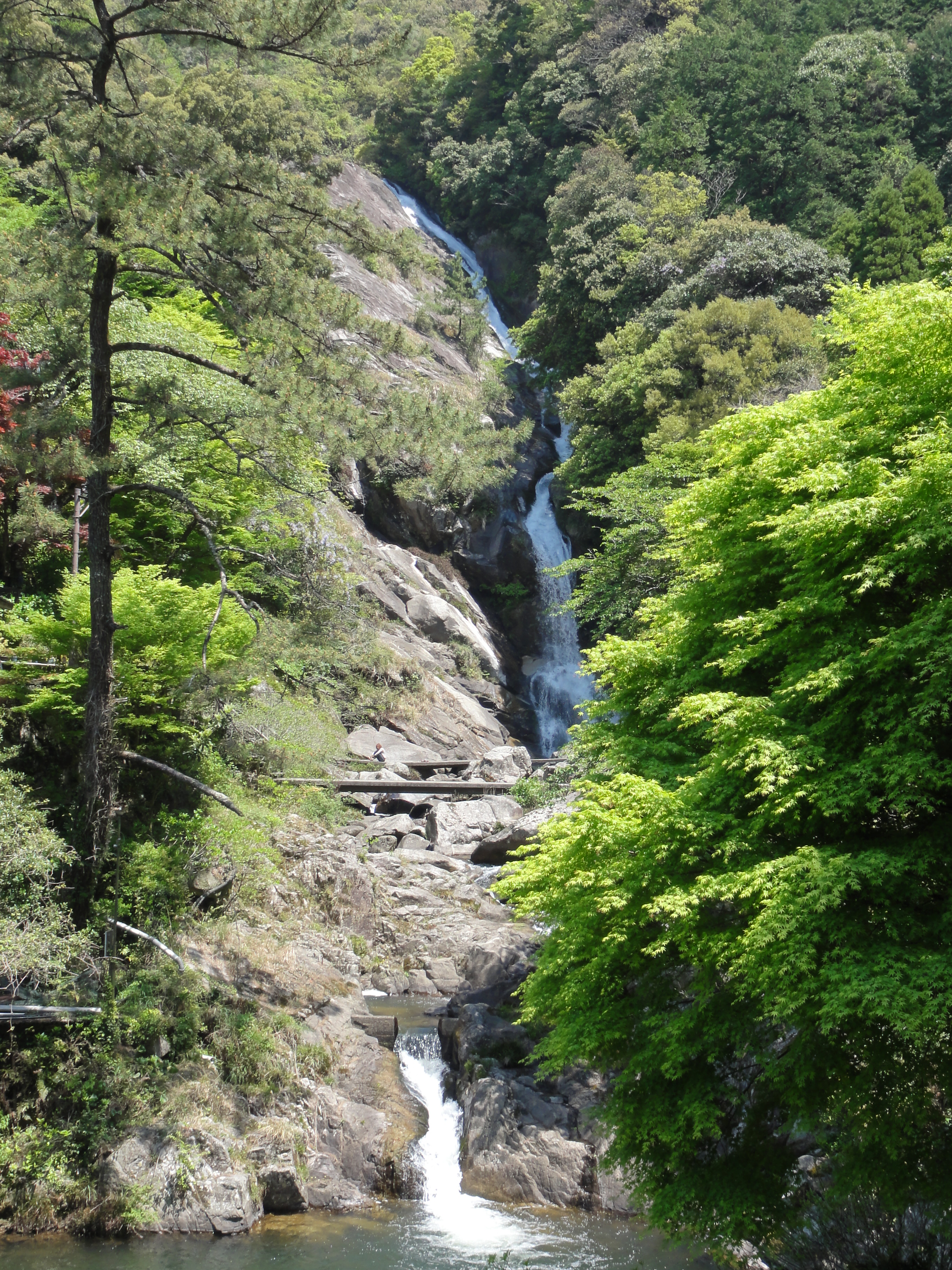
85. Mikaeri Falls

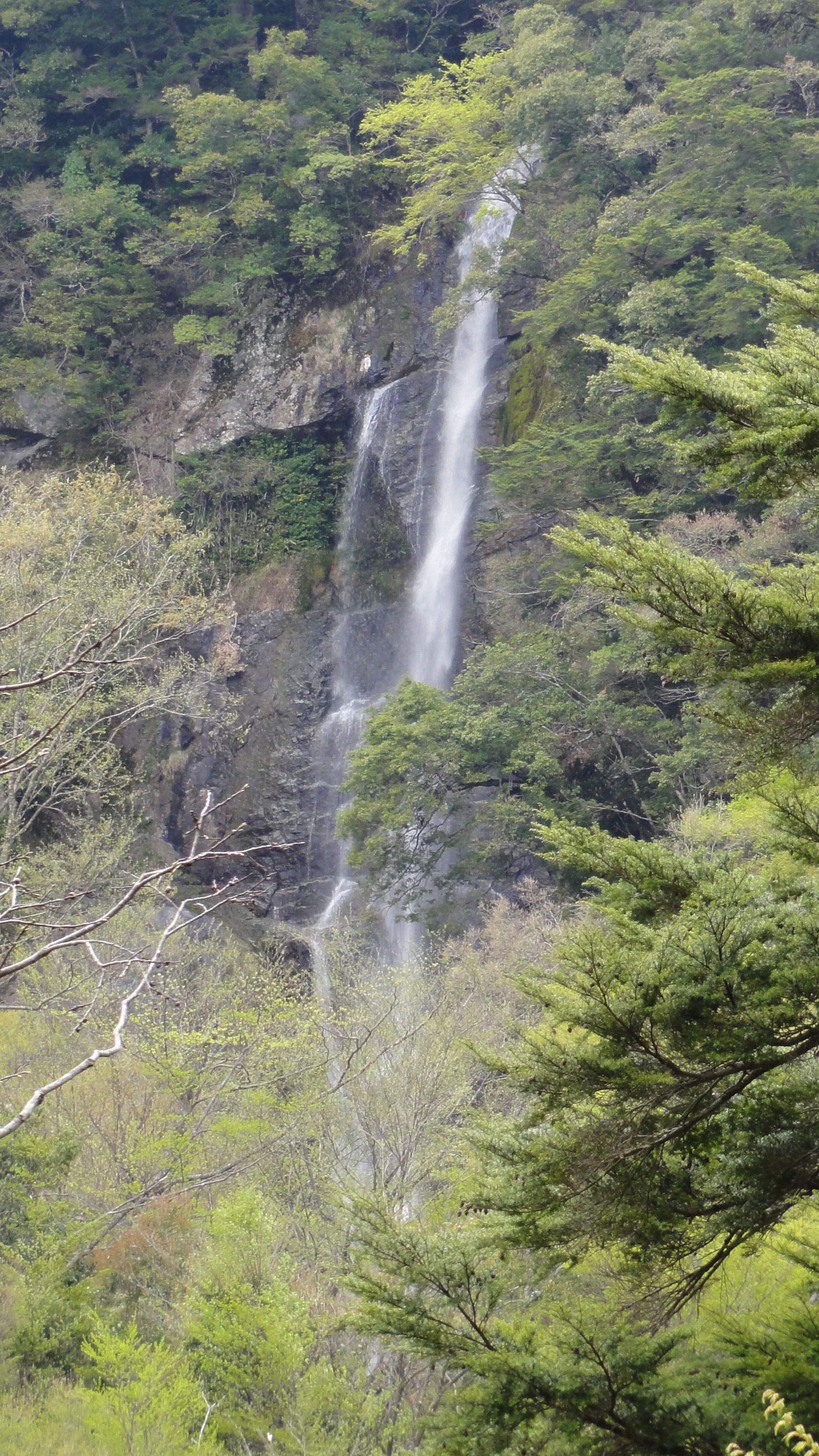
87. Sendantodoro Falls

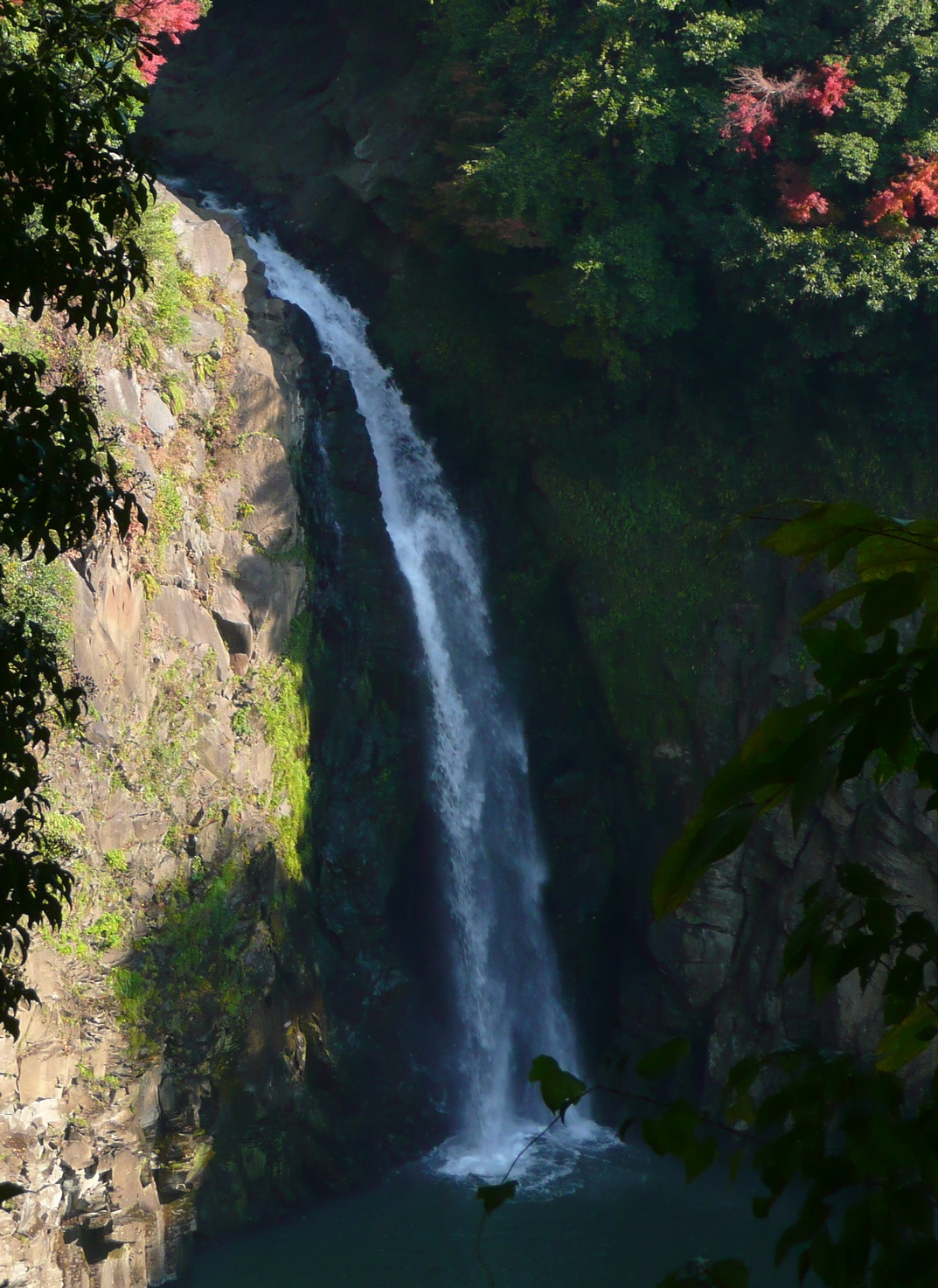
88. Sukaruga Falls

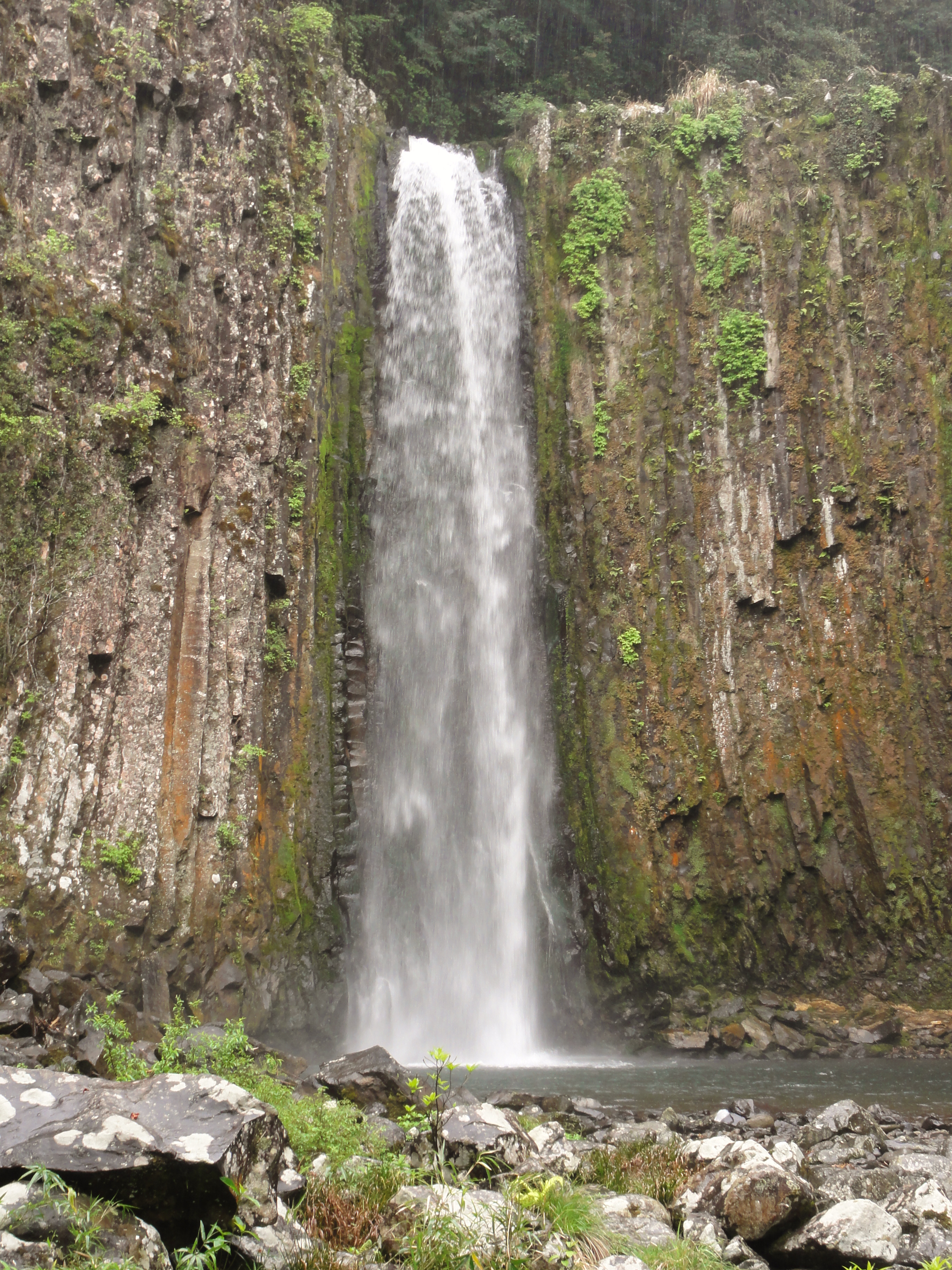
89. Kaname Falls

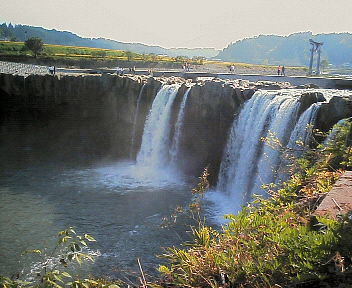
91. Harajiri Falls

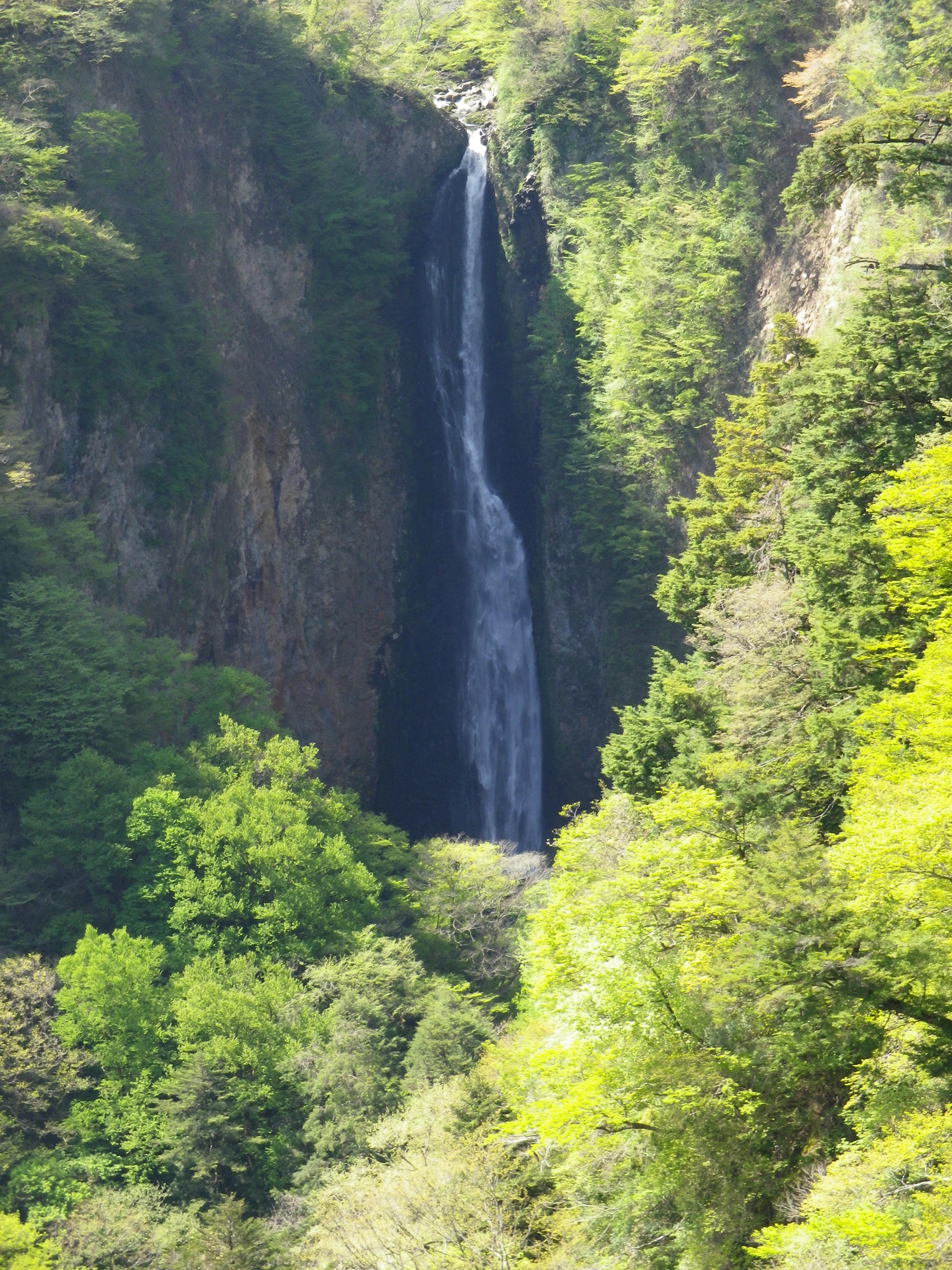
92. Shindō Falls

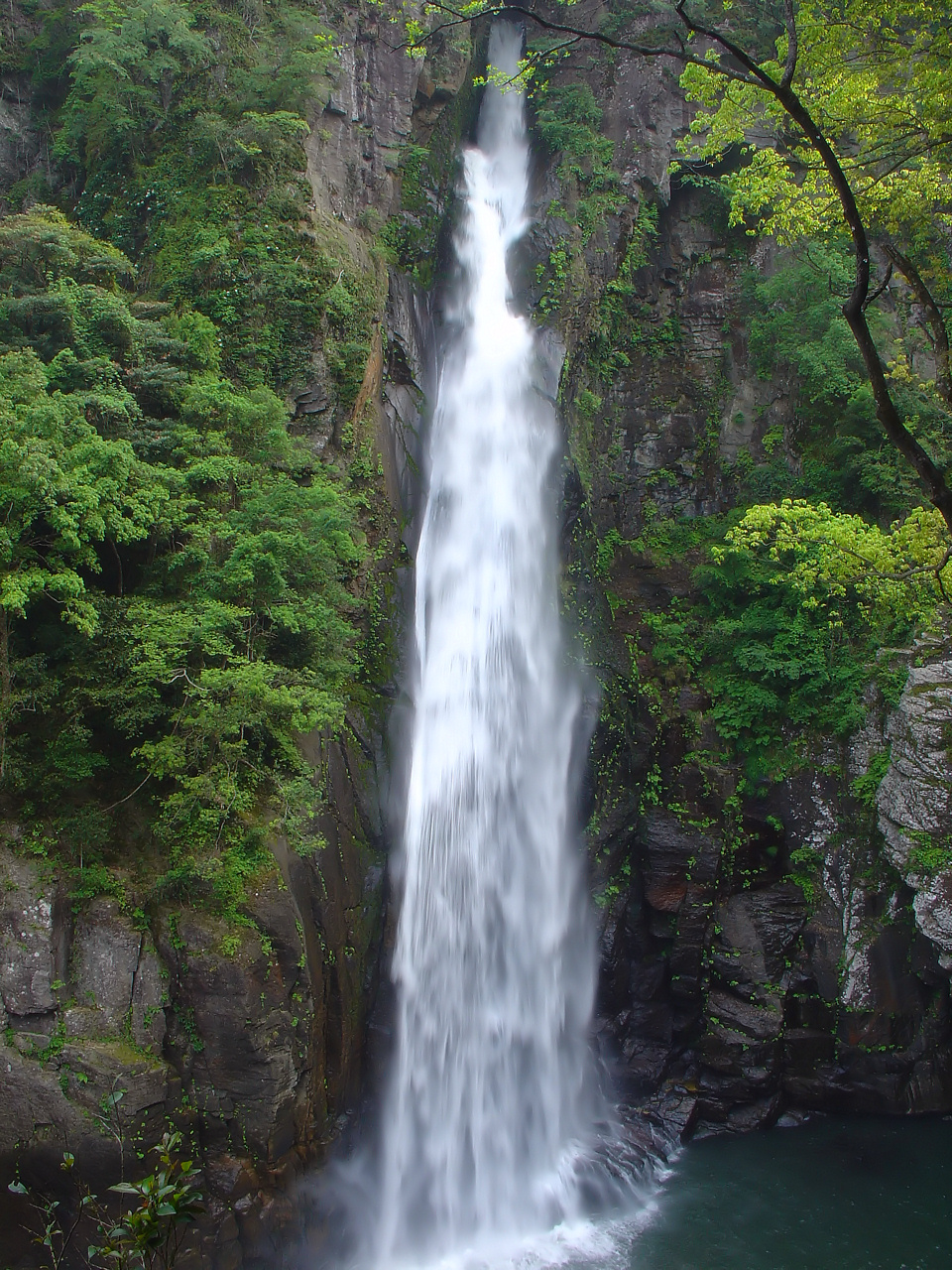
93. Nishishiiya Falls

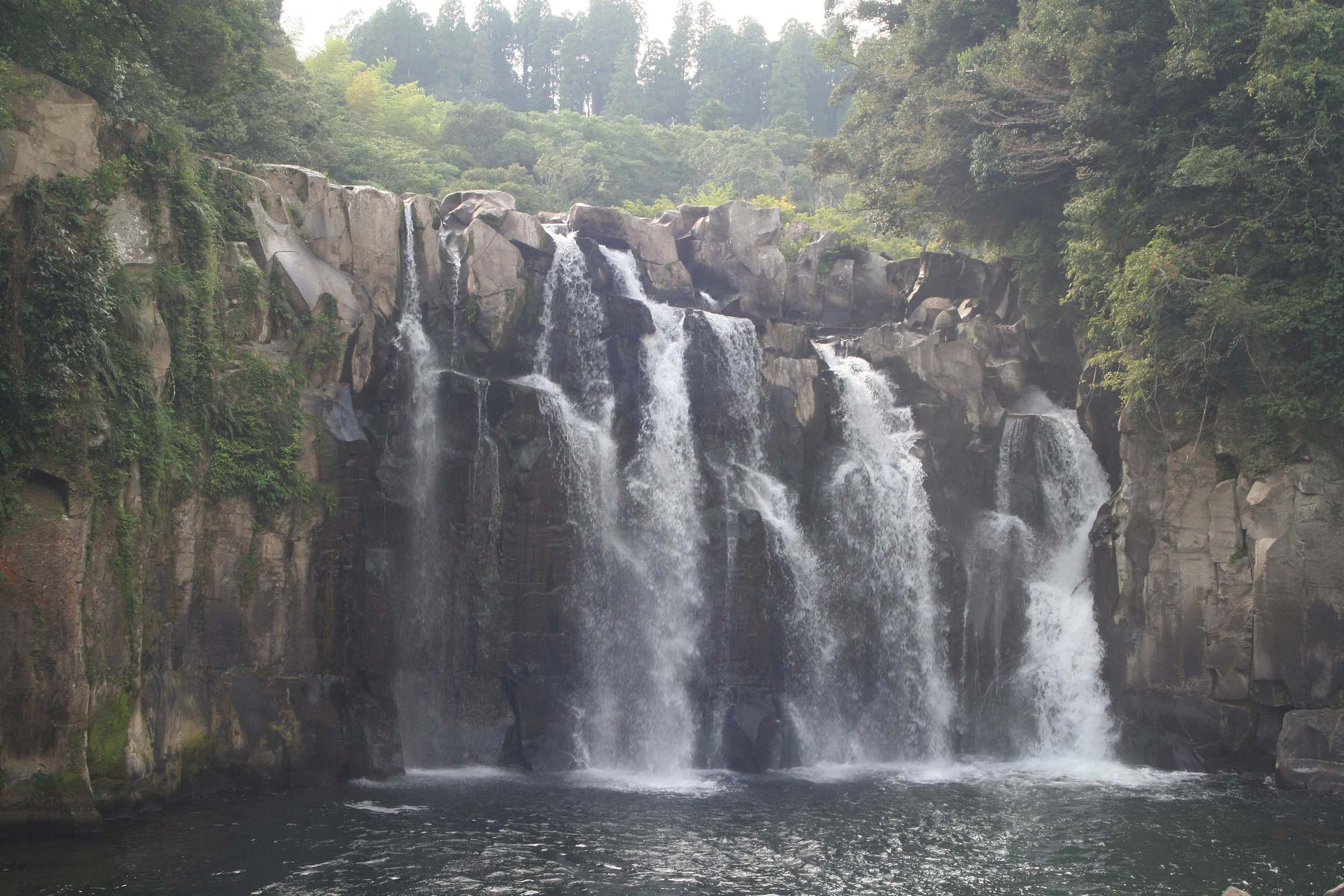
94. Sekinoo Falls

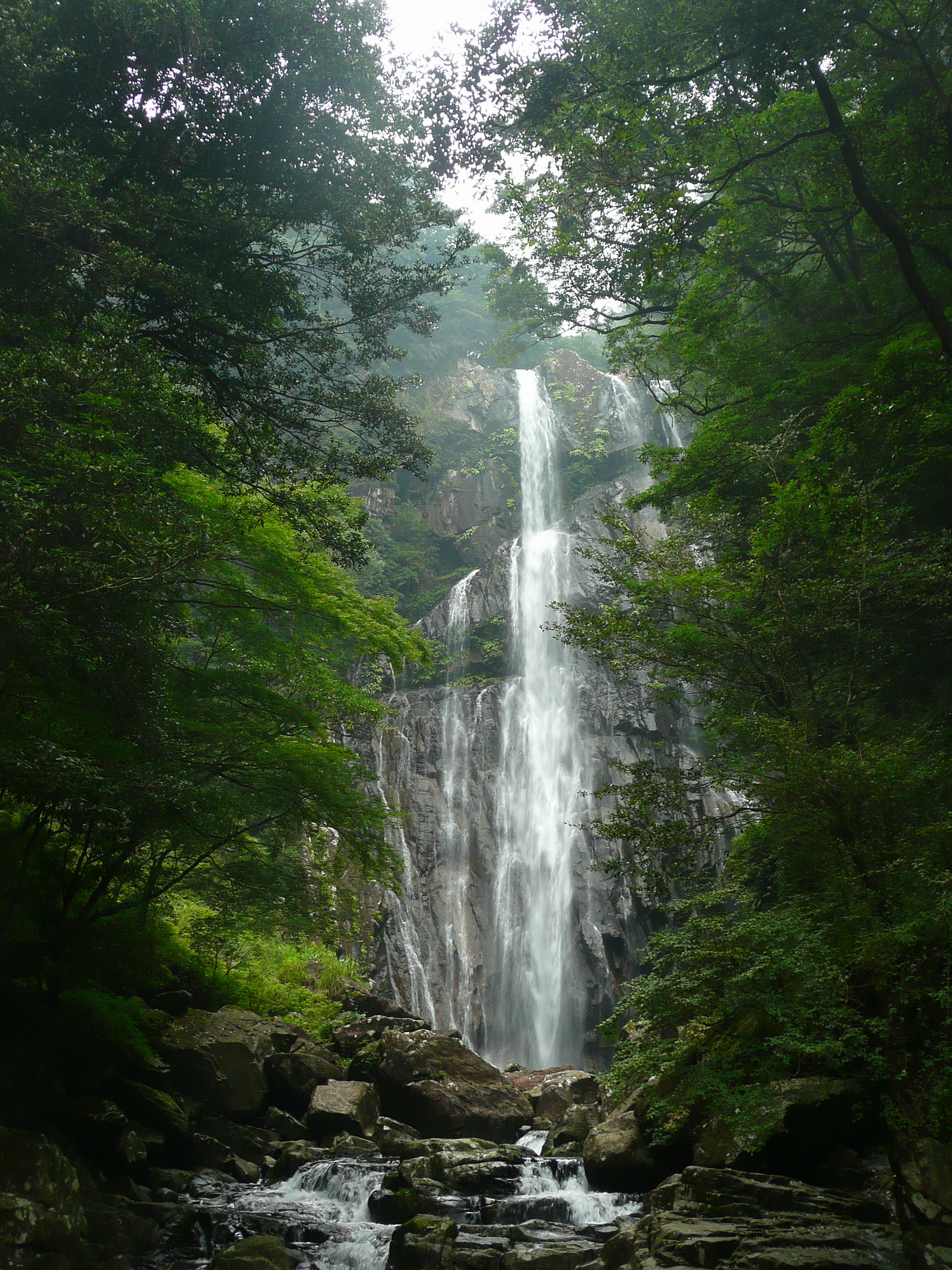
95. Yatogi Falls

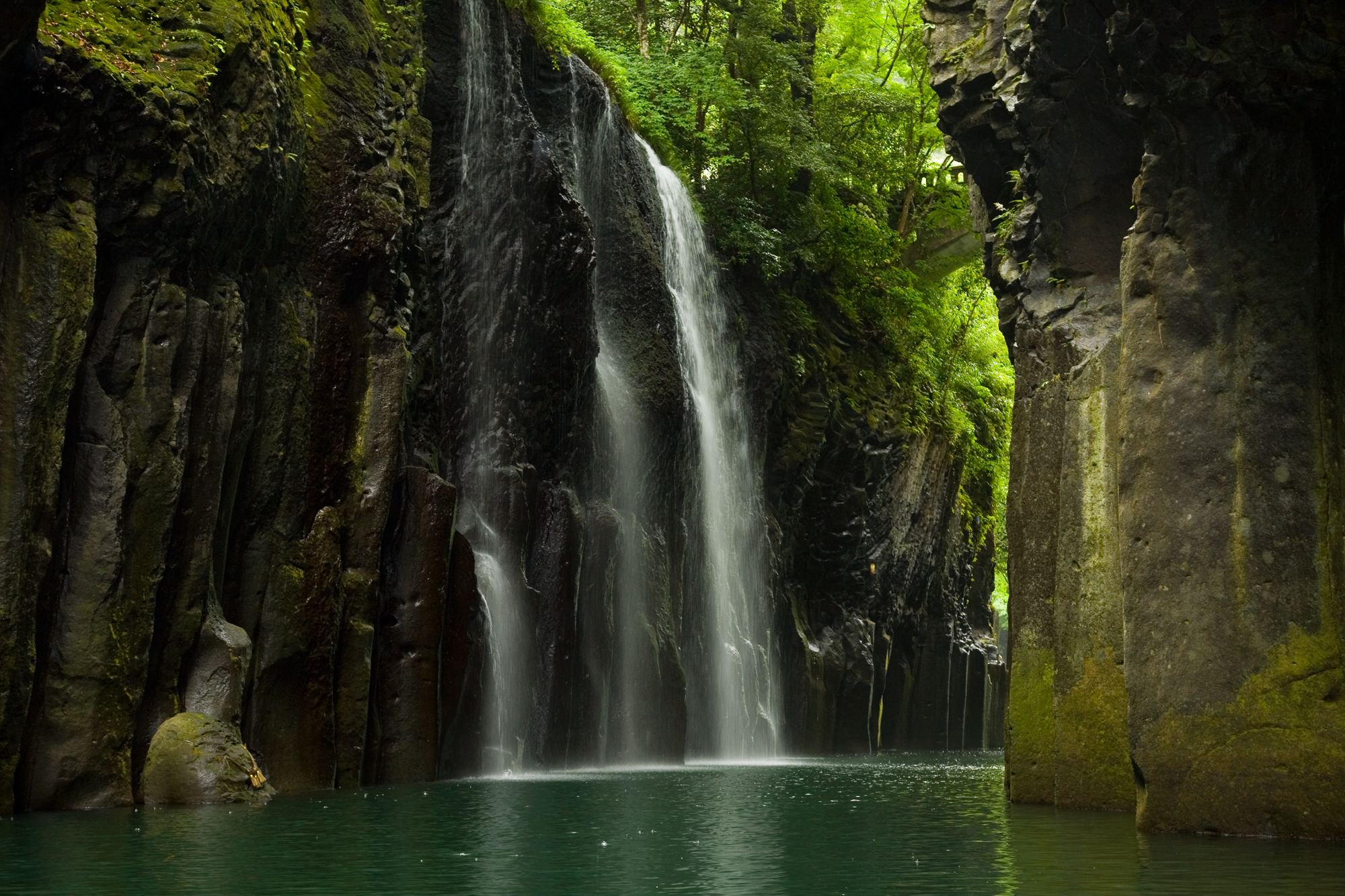
97. Manai Falls

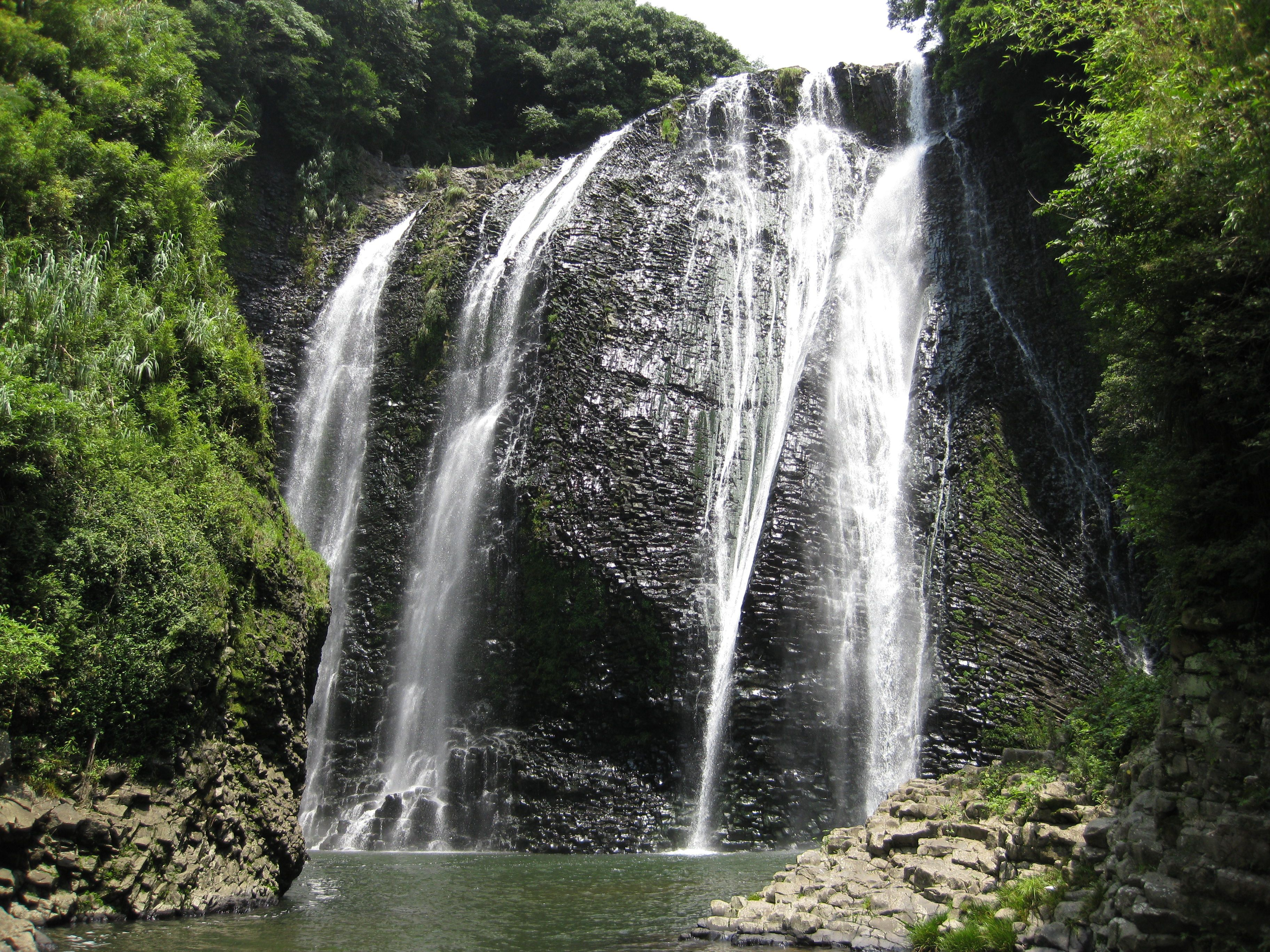
98. Ryūmon Falls

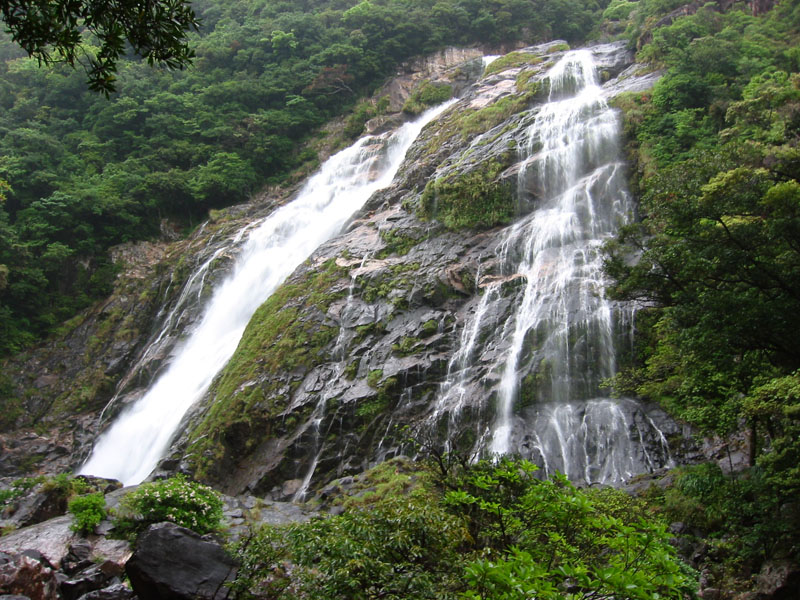
99. Ōko Falls

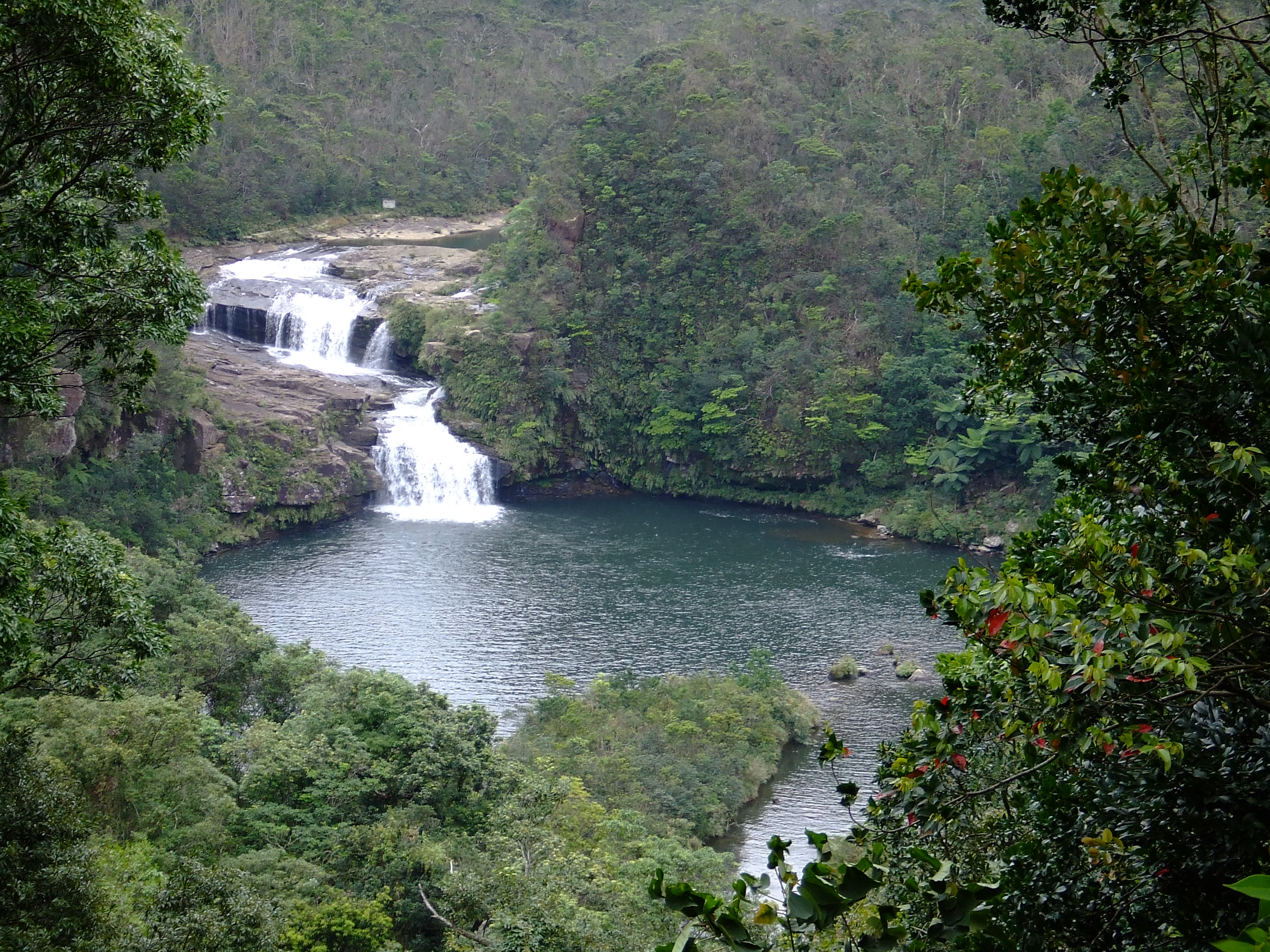
100. Mariyudu Falls

== See also ==
- List of waterfalls
