= Two People and One Person =

- Hell's Paradise episode
- A screenshot of the episode, featuring the characters Aza Chōbei and Aza Tōma
- Episode no.: Season 2 Episode 7
- Directed by: Ryōta Hoshikawa
- Written by: Akira Kindaichi
- Original air date: February 22, 2026
- Running time: 24 minutes

Episode chronology
← Previous "Hindering and Restoration"	Next → "Chrysanthemums and Peaches"

"Two People and One Person" (Japanese: 二人と一人, romanized: Futari to Hitori) is the twentieth overall episode of the anime television series Hell's Paradise, an adaptation of the manga series Hell's Paradise: Jigokuraku by Yuji Kaku. The series follows the shinobi Gabimaru, and executioner Yamada Asaemon Sagiri. Gabimaru was invited to participate in a journey to retrieve the elixir of life to receive a pardon from the shogunate. In the preceding episode, Gabimaru and his group enter the sacred mountain unaware of the Tensen spying on them. The fight commences in "Two People and One Person", primarily focusing on Hōrai, the location of the elixir of life.

The episode was produced by Twin Engine and Mappa, with Ryōta Hoshikawa as episode director, Yuka Kuroda as storyboard and animation director, and Akira Kindaichi as writer. "Two People and One Person" has received generally favorable reviews. Critics praised the episode's primary focus on one central location.

== Plot ==
In "Two People and One Person", swordsman and death-row criminal Tamiya Gantetsusai, executioner Yamada Asaemon Fuchi, and bandit Aza Tōma confront Lord Tensen members Ju Fa and Tao Fa, alongside Aza Chōbei. Chōbei informs Tōma that Lord Tensen consented to grant them immortality and encourages him to join their faction. They then confront Ju Fa, who is furious after witnessing their attack on Tao Fa. Tao Fa removes her outer clothing as she gets ready to fight Gantetsusai and Fuchi, to which both men respond by praising her figure.

Tao Fa charges at Gantetsusai, delivering a punch aimed at his stomach, sending him crashing into a nearby pillar with a kick. She notices Fuchi and invites him to join her in performing Bōchū Jutsu. Fuchi politely declines and severes her hand, explaining he is interested in examining her organs. Despite being severely injured from the kick, Gantetsusai manages to pull himself up.

== Voice cast ==
Gabimaru (画眉丸) / Gabimaru the Hollow (がらんの画眉丸, Garan no Gabimaru)

Voiced by: Chiaki Kobayashi (Japanese); Alejandro Saab (English)

Sagiri / Yamada Asaemon Sagiri (Japanese: 山田浅ェ門 佐切)

Voiced by: Yumiri Hanamori (Japanese); Marisa Duran (English)

Yuzuriha (Japanese: 杠) / Yuzuriha of Keishu (傾主の杠, Keishu no Yuzuriha)

Voiced by: Rie Takahashi (Japanese); Jill Harris (English)

Aza Tōma (亜左 桐馬)

Voiced by: Kensho Ono (Japanese); Matt Shipman (English)

Aza Chōbei (亜左 弔兵衛)

Voiced by: Ryōhei Kimura (Japanese); Nazeeh Tarsha (English)

Lord Tensen (てんせん, Tensen-sama)

Voiced by: Junichi Suwabe (Japanese); Ian Sinclair (Yang Form) (English)
Voiced by: Yūko Kaida (Japanese); Michelle Rojas (Yin Form) (English)

Tamiya Gantetsusai (民谷 巌鉄斎)

Voiced by: Tetsu Inada (Japanese); Phil Parsons (English)

== Production and broadcast ==
"Two People and One Person" was produced by animation studio Twin Engine and Mappa. It is the seventh episode of Hell's Paradise second season and the 20th of the series overall. The episode was directed by Ryōta Hoshikawa, while its script was written by Akira Kindaichi, and its storyboard drawn by Yuka Kuroda. (Note: Production staff information is taken from the ending credits of each episode.) "Two People and One Person" was broadcast on TV Tokyo and its affiliates on February 22, 2026.

== Reception ==
"Two People and One Person" has received generally favorable acclaim. In their review of the episode, Bolts writing for Anime News Network, noted the series had been a "gorgeous-looking anime with fluid action", but felt the episode "took things to another level", explaining "How everyone moved, dodged, and took advantage of their position was inspired. I also loved how the camera was used to showcase the action from different angles." In her review of "Two People and One Person", Allyson Johnson of But Why Tho? said the episode led to a "fantastic, brutalist battle between [them] and Tao Fa, as they both struggle to find new ways to attack them." InBetweenDraft's Kayla Chu stated "The animators lock in with "Two People and One Person" by keeping to one central location and focusing on one fight. Additionally, a lot of true personalities reveal themselves. This is as close to a perfect episode as one can get." Writing for The Geekiary, Farid-ul-Haq said "[I] enjoyed how the creatives had such characters grasp the severity of the situation. They needed to understand Tao, in their own manner, if they were to survive against Tao Fa. Being a visual learner, Fuchi decided to use the destruction of the environment to detect Tao. And later he decided to use himself so Gantetsusai could see the aftermath of being hit by Tao attacks."
