= Hell's Paradise season 1 =

First season of Hell's Paradise

Hell's Paradise
- Season 1
- Key visual for the season
- No. of episodes: 13

Release
- Original network: TV Tokyo
- Original release: April 1 – July 1, 2023

Season chronology
- Next → Season 2

The first season of Hell's Paradise, an anime television series based on the manga series Hell's Paradise: Jigokuraku by Yuji Kaku, premiered on TV Tokyo and its TX Network affiliates on April 1, 2023, and concluded on July 1, 2023. The season was produced by Twin Engine and MAPPA and directed by Kaori Makita, with Akira Kindaichi writing the scripts, Akitsugu Hisagi designing the characters, and Yoshiaki Dewa composing the music. The story follows the ninja Gabimaru and executioner Yamada Asaemon Sagiri as they search for the elixir of life. The season adapts the manga's "Island" and "Lord Tensen" story arcs, which are covered in the first five volumes (chapters 1–59).

Crunchyroll streamed the season internationally outside of Asia, while Netflix streamed it in Asia-Pacific (excluding Mainland China, Australia, and New Zealand).

== Episodes ==
No. overall	No. in season	Title	Directed by (Note: Production staff information is taken from the ending credits of each episode.)	Storyboarded by	Chief animation directed by	Original release date
1	1	"The Death Row Convict and the Executioner"; Transliteration: "Shizaijin to Shikkōnin" (Japanese: 死罪人と執行人)	Kaori Makita	Kaori Makita	Akitsugu Hisagi	April 1, 2023
A shinobi named Gabimaru foils attempted executions by beheading and burning and curses his inability to die. He explains to his interrogator that he underwent Iwagakure village shinobi training such that he developed a superhuman body and became an efficient killer. He says he was married to the clan chief's daughter, but after he asked the chief for permission to leave, he was betrayed to the authorities. After more fruitless attempts to execute him, Gabimaru faces his interrogator who is revealed to be Yamada Asaemon Sagiri, a Yamada clan sword-tester and executioner. Sensing her skill as a calm and efficient executioner, Gabimaru experiences fear and fights back, especially after Sagiri asserts that he is still deeply in love with his wife. Sagiri abruptly offers a full pardon and government protection for himself and his wife in exchange for fulfilling a death-defying mission. He must go to Shinsenkyo, a legendary land rumored to hold the Elixir of Immortality and retrieve the elixir in competition with other death row criminals. The promise of a peaceful life with his beloved wife prompts Gabimaru to agree unhesitatingly.
2	2	"Screening and Choosing"; Transliteration: "Senbetsu to Sentaku" (Japanese: 選別と選択)	Yasuhiro Geshi	Kazuki Akane	Akitsugu Hisagi & Ryōta Arima	April 8, 2023
Sagiri recalls her early training as an executioner and the difficulty she has had overcoming her fear and hesitation. The over 30 blindfolded condemned criminals who have volunteered for the mission are given their instructions by the 11th Sei-i Taishogun, Nariyoshi Tokugawa. They are shown an officer who returned from an earlier expedition but is no longer human, with flowers blooming from his body. They will be each be accompanied by a Yamada Asaemon; however, they are told to reduce their numbers which causes a killing spree. While the shogun delights in the carnage before him Gabimaru addresses him, saying there must be a better way to make the selection. The shogun's head guard offers a place on the mission to anyone who kills Gabimaru who is then reluctantly forced to fight for his life, brutally killing his attackers with his tied-up hands. As the names of the ten prisoners selected to go on the mission are read out, including Gabimaru, Sagiri realizes that her problem is not overcoming her fear of killing, but accepting the burden of responsibility for the lives she takes.
3	3	"Weakness and Strength"; Transliteration: "Yowasa to Tsuyosa" (Japanese: 弱さと強さ)	Kayona Yamada	Soji Ninomiya	Akitsugu Hisagi & Ryōta Arima	April 15, 2023
Gabimaru becomes convinced that the elixir of immortality, Tokijiku no Kagunomi, truly exists after witnessing the chief of Iwagakure survive multiple fatal wounds. Upon arriving at the island's shore with Sagiri, he suggests that the elixir may not originate from the island itself. Their arrival is immediately disrupted by an attack from the condemned criminal Twisted Keiun, a weapons specialist accompanied by Yamada Asaemon Kisho. Despite being restrained at Sagiri's insistence, Gabimaru effortlessly endures Keiun's assault and brutally kills him using Keiun's own weapons. As Kisho departs with Keiun's severed head, he informs Sagiri that the criminals have already begun killing one another and predicts that most will soon be dead – after which the Iwagakure will likely be deployed instead. Left alone, Gabimaru attempts to kill Sagiri to pursue the elixir freely but finds himself unable to strike the final blow. Both come to realize that Gabimaru is not hollow; his lingering emotions and love for his wife are his true strength, not a weakness. Elsewhere, the criminal Tamiya Gantetsusai is stung by a human-faced butterfly, forcing him to sever his own arm as it withers and blooms into flowers. Soon after, both he and Gabimaru are confronted by grotesque monsters, as bizarre creatures begin closing in around them.
4	4	"Hell and Paradise"; Transliteration: "Jigoku to Gokuraku" (Japanese: 地獄と極楽)	Tetsuya Wakano	Tetsuya Wakano	Akitsugu Hisagi, Ryōta Arima & Datto-kun	April 22, 2023
Gantetsusai tells his Yamada Asaemon Fuchi why he was sentenced to death, and sets out to eliminate the other criminals to simplify his search for the elixir. Meanwhile, Gabimaru and Sagiri who are being menaced by various huge fantastical creatures with Buddha-like features. When one attacks and injures Gabimaru, he realizes that they are surrounded and confronted by numerous opponents with unknown abilities. He throws caution to the wind and acting only on instinct for survival, attacks them. He destroys most of them, uncharacteristically protecting Sagiri in the process, until Yamada Asaemon Genji arrives and assists, accompanied by Yamada Asaemon Senta with the ninja criminal Yuzuriha. Yuzuriha offers to work with Gabimaru in exchange for information she gathered on the creatures by experimenting on Moro Makiya the Apostate before she killed him, leaving Genji without his charge. As they talk, Sagiri loses consciousness and collapses. Meanwhile, Aza Chōbei and his younger brother Yamada Asaemon Toma face a similar group of monsters. Aza is feels he is in control of the situation until he is wounded and Toma is captured. He then cuts the monsters to pieces a berserker rage.
5	5	"The Samurai and the Woman"; Transliteration: "Samurai to Onna" (Japanese: 侍と女)	Shū Watanabe	Shigeyuki Miya	Akitsugu Hisagi & Ryōta Arima	April 29, 2023
Sagiri wakes up to find the group has moved away from the human-faced butterflies, whose poisonous scales caused her to faint. Gabimaru explains that while scouting alone, he discovered many plants on the island were once samurai sent by the shogunate, transformed into vegetation. Senta also shares information he gathered since arriving. Genji suggests replacing Sagiri as Gabimaru's guard, claiming she lacks combat skill, but she firmly refuses. Elsewhere, Yamada Asaemon Tenza attempts to escape the island by boat with the criminal Nurugai, the last of the Sanka people. Their path is blocked by a graveyard of wrecked samurai ships. Attacked by monsters, they flee across the debris and encounter Kisho, still alive but grotesquely altered, with flowers sprouting from his body. Nurugai, burdened by guilt, gives up, but Tenza refuses to abandon hope and fights on. Later, Tenza realizes Nurugai is a young woman, and they decide to circle the island for escape. Gabimaru reassures Sagiri, rejecting Genji's demand that she abandon the sword for domestic life. Suddenly, Rokurota, the Giant of Bizen, appears and tears a large piece out of Genji's body.
6	6	"Heart and Reason"; Transliteration: "Kokoro to Kotowari" (Japanese: 心と理(ことわり))	Yasuhiro Geshi	Yasuhiro Geshi	Akitsugu Hisagi & Ryōta Arima	May 6, 2023
Genji is gravely wounded when the monstrous Rokurota attacks, and as Sagiri tries to help him, he urges her to flee. Gabimaru intervenes just in time, saving Sagiri and engaging Rokurota, but he quickly realizes the giant has no obvious weaknesses. As Genji lies dying, he acknowledges that Sagiri has found balance between emotion and reason, strength and compassion, and entrusts her with his sword. Using it, Sagiri manages to sever one of Rokurota's fingers. Despite fighting together, she and Gabimaru are still overwhelmed by his sheer power. Forced to escalate the battle, Gabimaru activates his Ninpo Ascetic Blaze Mode, launching flames that engulf the surrounding jungle. The resulting fire and smoke deprive Rokurota of oxygen, causing him to collapse to his knees. Seizing the opportunity, Sagiri delivers the final blow and decapitates him. However, the spreading flames attract other giant monsters on the island, forcing Gabimaru and Sagiri to flee the burning area. Realizing the growing danger of the island, they agree that finding the elixir quickly is the only way to save lives and escape. They later reunite with Senta and the ninja Yuzuriha at a village, while elsewhere, Chōbei Aza and his brother Tōma encounter two strange, androgynous lovers in the jungle.
7	7	"Flowers and Offerings"; Transliteration: "Hana to Nie" (Japanese: 花と贄)	Kento Shintani	Risako Yoshida	Akitsugu Hisagi & Ryōta Arima	May 13, 2023
Chobei and Toma are confronted by the two Tensen who see as humans as interlopers. Gabimaru's group encounters a young girl, but when he pursues her he finds that she has powerful abilities and is protected by a large wooden being. After they are both defeated by Gabimaru and Yuzuriha, the being offers to take them to a village. At the village, the wooden being Hoko and his young companion, Mei, offer them fruit and he tells them that they call the place Kotaku on the island of Shinsenkyo. The island is divided into three regions, the shore and forest is called "Eishu", the village is in "Hojo", and the elixir "Tan" is located in the central region of mists called "Horai" which is inhabited by the god-like Tensen who are immortal. Meanwhile, Chobei and Toma are easily defeated by the two lovers who are Tensen, and the brothers are dropped into a pit to be turned into flowers and become the source of Tan. At Sagiri's prompting, Gabimaru takes time to bathe and recalls his wife's advice to relax in order to be prepared for the battle ahead.
8	8	"Student and Master"; Transliteration: "Deshi to Shi" (Japanese: 弟子と師)	Fumito Yamada	Kaori Makita	Akitsugu Hisagi & Ryōta Arima	May 20, 2023
Tenza recalls his early life as a street urchin when he was taken in as a student by the master Yamada Asaemon Shion who recognized his potential. Tenza and Nurugai continue their circuit of the island, but are interrupted by an androgynous Tensen flame-colored hair which easily casts Tenza aside. Tenza uses his speed to slice at the Tensen, severing its head, but it regenerates itself and pursues them. They are saved momentarily by the blind but experienced Shion who again decapitates the Tensen. He explains that he killed the criminal Akaginu when she tried to seduce him, but then he could not find a current to lead him off the island. Suddenly, the Tensen strikes again, striking Shion in the throat and when Tenza attacks with his sword, he receives a fatal blow. In a last desperate effort to save Shion and Nurugai, Tenza attacks the Tensen with his bare hands giving his life so that they can escape.
9	9	"Gods and People"; Transliteration: "Kami to Hito" (Japanese: 神と人)	Ryūta Yamamoto	Jun Shishido	Akitsugu Hisagi & Ryōta Arima	June 3, 2023
Gabimaru becomes impatient and heads off alone towards Horai at the center of the island, passing immobile trees chanting sutras. He reaches a temple where he is confronted by the same Tensen who killed Tenza. Gabimaru uses all his skills and techniques against the Tensen but it quickly regenerates itself, so in desperation he launches multiple rapid attacks which eventually succeed. As the Tensen expires, it is consumed by flowers which form a large half-plant and half-human monster. The monster attacks and grabs Gabimaru who recalling his training, uses his remaining energy to deal the strongest attack he can, creating a reprieve and is then rescued by Mei. Hoko offers to take Sagiri and the others to Horai and look for Mei. Meanwhile, the seven Tensen: Shangdi Samantabhadra, Dadi Aksho, Jiujun Amoghavajra, Sagacious Dasheng Ratna, Yuanjun Tathata, Gonggong Manjusri and Deified Dijun Cundi, gather to review the situation and partake of the elixir. Hoko offers to take the others to find Mei and Gabimaru, and explains that all humans who inhabited the island were eventually transformed into plants. As Gabimaru recovers consciousness he is met by Tamiya Gantetsusai and Yamada Asaemon Fuchi.
10	10	"Yin and Yang"; Transliteration: "In to Yō" (Japanese: 陰と陽)	Tarō Kubo & Yūki Nishihata	Tetsuya Wakano	Akitsugu Hisagi & Ryōta Arima	June 10, 2023
In his present condition, Gabimaru is too weak to battle Gantetsusai and Fuchi, and after he describes the Tensen and their powers they agree to collaborate. Meanwhile, Senta concludes that the island is not the real Shinsenkyo, and the mixed-up deities are not real gods, similar to the construct of Moro Makiya, the founder of a new religion who is plotting to overthrow the shogun, thus theorizing that someone created the island. Gabimaru questions Mei about the Tensen and she mentions they possess Tao while at the same time Hoko tells his group about Tao and how it is like the flow of qi, a combination of yin and yang and centered on the lower dantian, below the naval. Elsewhere, while Nurugai presses Shion to teach her how to use a sword they come under attack from a group of mindless monsters. Meanwhile, Chobei slowly drags Tomi from the pit of grasping flowers where they are met by a Doshi, a sentient monster unlike the mindless Soshin, who has been sent to investigate the human interlopers. Chobei attacks the Doshi while Tomi slashes at an approaching group of Soshin, however the Doshi strikes Chobei a deadly blow.
11	11	"Weak and Strong"; Transliteration: "Yowai to Tsuyoi" (Japanese: 弱イと強イ)	Yasuhiro Geshi	Shigeyuki Miya	Akitsugu Hisagi & Ryōta Arima	June 17, 2023
Even though Chobei was dealt a fatal blow, he recovers to attack the Doshi again. This time he seems to have acquired some regenerative ability after being in the pit of flowers and is also able to detect the Tao within the Doshi and defeat it. Elsewhere, as Gabimaru and Gantetsusai fight the Soshin, Mei repeats the words, strong and weak. Suddenly, a half-human, half-insect Doshi appears to capture Mei whom he wants to return to the Horai. Gabimaru uncharacteristically acts to protect her but he and Gantetsusai come under attack from swarms of insects. Fuchi understands what Mei is saying and explains to Gabimaru that Tao is a balance weakness and strength, so to see the Tao emanating from the Doshi, he must acknowledge his weaker side. Gabimaru struggles to do so, but he begins to see the Tao flowing around the two Doshi and is able to defeat them. Meanwhile, Hoko leads Sagiri and the others to the gates of the Horai where a Tensen with magenta hair summarily removes Hoko's wooden head.
12	12	"Umbrella and Ink"; Transliteration: "Kasa to Sumi" (Japanese: 傘と墨)	Teruyuki Ōmine	Jun Shishido	Akitsugu Hisagi & Ryōta Arima	June 24, 2023
The Tensen is revealed to be the peony Jiujun Amoghavajra and says that Tan is not an elixir, because if humans consume it they turn into plants. In lightning fast movements, Yuzuriha slashes Amoghavajra to pieces, and then tries to poison it, but the Tensen regenerates itself each time. Eventually, Sagiri, Senta and Yuzuriha utilize their own knowledge and experience of Tao to jointly attack and defeat the Tensen although it leaves them injured and exhausted. Some time later, as Senta proposes that they find a way to save the other members of the expedition, the Tensen becomes a giant flower and fires a dart-like projectile at Yuzuriha. Senta throws himself in front of her and is hit instead. He begins sprouting flowers and imagines that he is painting a picture of a dancing Yuzuriha holding a parasol. The monster then fires a series of darts at the two women which are intercepted by Shion who suddenly appears to save them.
13	13	"Dreams and Reality"; Transliteration: "Yume to Utsutsu" (Japanese: 夢と現(うつつ))	Kaori Makita & Yasuhiro Geshi	Jun Shishido & Teruyuki Ōmine	Akitsugu Hisagi & Ryōta Arima	July 1, 2023
Shion explains to Sagiri that he is using his awareness of Tao to counteract the power of the Tensen, however he is unable to defeat it himself and is wounded by its darts. Nurugai cuts the sprouting flowers from Senta, temporarily reviving him, then Sagiri and Nurugai both attack the Tensen from the front enabling Shion to attack from behind. They are unsuccessful until Senta suggests they attack its ovule which is the vulnerable point of the plant-like Tensen. The badly wounded Shion manages to then strike a killing blow with his sword, and Yuzuriha consoles Senta as he dies from his injuries. Sagiri proposes the Yamada Asaemon and criminals must cooperate if they are to leave the island alive. As they discuss their next steps, both Shion and Yuzuriha question Sagiri's relationship with Gabimaru, and speculate that what motivates him, his desire to reunite with his wife, may be a deception. Meanwhile, Gabimaru awakens after collapsing from exhaustion and finds that he cannot remember the name or face of his wife.

== Music ==
Cover for Hell's Paradise: Jigokuraku (Original Soundtrack)

The music for the series was composed by Yoshiaki Dewa. The opening theme song is "Work", performed by Ringo Sheena and Millennium Parade, while the ending theme song is "Kamihitoe" (紙一重; lit. 'A Fine Line'), performed by Uru.

Hell's Paradise: Jigokuraku Original Soundtrack (TVアニメ「地獄楽」Original Soundtrack, TV Anime "Jigokuraku" Original Saundotorakku) is the soundtrack to the 2023 TV anime series Hell's Paradise. It was composed by Yoshiaki Dewa, and released on July 19, 2023, by Fabtone Records and Fujipacific Music.

=== Track listing ===
No.	Title	Writer(s)	Length
1.	"Hell's Paradise"	Yoshiaki Dewa	3:46
2.	"The Empty Heart"	Dewa	2:45
3.	"Ringing Condolence"	Dewa	2:10
4.	"The Tempting Garden"	Dewa	1:57
5.	"The Gods Bloom"	Dewa	2:57
6.	"Blackout"	Dewa	1:44
7.	"What're In Murders?"	Dewa	1:58
8.	"Evil Spirits and Monsters"	Dewa	2:32
9.	"The Paradise"	Dewa	2:02
10.	"The Defective Angels"	Dewa	2:33
11.	"Librating Scale"	Dewa	2:02
12.	"Mercy Falls Like Flowers"	Dewa	2:33
13.	"The Empty Vessel"	Dewa	2:18
14.	"Open Fire"	Dewa	2:48
15.	"Be My Nourishment"	Dewa	2:23
16.	"You Reap What You Sow."	Dewa	2:06
17.	"Phantom Butterfly"	Dewa	2:18
18.	"An Ephemeral Dream"	Dewa	2:24
19.	"Kalma Effects"	Dewa	1:58
20.	"Sprouting Madness"	Dewa	2:02
21.	"Celebrating Curse"	Dewa	1:53
22.	"En Garde"	Dewa	2:01
23.	"After Lamentation"	Dewa	2:05
24.	"Hermitage"	Dewa	2:24
25.	"Slippery"	Dewa	1:12
26.	"Ahhhhhhh......."	Dewa	1:23
27.	"Villains"	Dewa	2:20
28.	"Phantom Light"	Dewa	2:28
29.	"Blur of Blade"	Dewa	2:03
30.	"Spiderweb"	Dewa	1:49
31.	"Wild Uproar"	Dewa	2:07
32.	"SHINOBI"	Dewa	1:27
33.	"The Prison"	Dewa	2:11
34.	"Cemetary of Bravery"	Dewa	1:45
35.	"Torsion"	Dewa	2:06
36.	"Introduction, Development, and Development"	Dewa	1:47
37.	"The Deep Moon"	Dewa	2:53
38.	"Dialogue on the Deathbed"	Dewa	1:47
39.	"Advance in the Gorge"	Dewa	2:06
40.	"Deadly Enemies"	Dewa	2:09
41.	"ITADAKIMASU"	Dewa	2:45
42.	"Your Hearts Will Bloom Someday"	Dewa	3:59
43.	"An Animals' Trail"	Dewa	1:52
44.	"Gratia"	Dewa	3:15
45.	"Invictus"	Dewa	3:00

== Reception ==
Panos Kotzathanasis from Asian Movie Pulse gave the first season a score of 7.5 out of 10, writing "Probably the most popular new shonen anime this year so far, Hell's Paradise follows the rules of the samurai / ninja category, but also functions as a homage from a number of other famous titles, which, in combination with a series of other aspects, makes it quite unique." Writing for But Why Tho?, Kate Sánchez wrote "... a series that emotionally hits above its action-packed weight class and leaves a lasting impression." Also writing that "On the animation front, Hell's Paradise is gorgeous. The beauty of the series comes from MAPPA's ability to give as much attention and care to the grotesque elements of the series, like the creatures and gods, that let it highlight the beautiful designs too."

== Home media release ==
=== Japanese ===
Twin Engine (Japan – Region 2/A)
Vol.	Episodes	Front cover character(s)	Back cover character(s)	Release date	Ref.
1	1–6	Gabimaru and Yamada Asaemon Sagiri	Aza Tōma and Aza Chōbei	October 4, 2023	
2	7–13	Shion, Yamada Asaemon Tenza and Nurugai	Yamada Asaemon Senta and Yuzuriha	October 25, 2023	

=== English ===
Crunchyroll, LLC (North America – Region 1/A)
Season	Episodes	Release date	Ref.
1	1–13	August 27, 2024	
