= Hell's Paradise season 2 =

Second season of Hell's Paradise

Hell's Paradise
- Season 2
- Key visual for the season
- No. of episodes: 12

Release
- Original network: TV Tokyo
- Original release: January 11 – March 29, 2026

Season chronology
- ← Previous; Season 1

The second season of Hell's Paradise, an anime television series based on the manga series Hell's Paradise: Jigokuraku by Yuji Kaku, premiered on TV Tokyo and its TX Network affiliates on January 11, 2026, and concluded on March 29, 2026. Similar to the previous season, it was produced by Twin Engine and MAPPA with direction by Kaori Makita, scriptwriting by Akira Kindaichi, composition by Yoshiaki Dewa, character design by Akitsugu Hisagi. The story continues to follow the ninja Gabimaru and executioner Yamada Asaemon Sagiri as they search for the elixir of life. The opening theme song is "Kasuka na Hana" (かすかなはな; lit. 'Faint Flower'), performed by Tatsuya Kitani featuring Babymetal, while the ending theme song is "Personal", performed by Queen Bee. The season adapts the manga's "Lord Tensen" and "Hōrai" story arcs, covering the 6th to 9th volumes (chapters 60–89; additionally 94 from the 10th volume). Crunchyroll licensed the season for streaming outside of Asia as it aired.

== Development ==
Following the conclusion of the first season in July 2023, a second season would be announced. In an interview with Crunchyroll regarding his experience on the creation of the season, Kaku stated "When it comes to anime production, [...] a philosophy of mine is that the animation production staff team should be empowered. They should really find motivation in their own work within their own team." Going further into detail, "Rather than micromanaging, I want them to feel free to do their best because [I] believe that ultimately creates the best content." Most staff and cast reprised their roles from the first season.

== Reception ==
Mariló Delgado of Espinof in her review of the season had wrote "Although Hell's Paradise has returned with MAPPA putting on a spectacular show and proving that the wait was worthwhile [...] Things on the island remain tense, with rising tensions among the warriors and monstrous threats from Shinsenkyo[...] And in the middle of it all is Gabimaru, who ultimately just wants to go home and try to reclaim his life."

== Episodes ==
No. overall	No. in season	Title	Directed by (Note: Production staff information is taken from the ending credits of each episode.)	Storyboarded by	Chief animation directed by	Original release date
14	1	"Dawn and Confusion"; Transliteration: "Reimei to Konmei" (Japanese: 黎明と昏迷)	Kaori Makita	Kaori Makita	Akitsugu Hisagi & Rie Nishimura	January 11, 2026
As the only one so far to return from Shinsenkyo, Yamada Asaemon Jikka is questioned at the Ohashi Inn by the shogunate about the quest, but he glosses over the events and neglects to mention the head of a giant monster which was dredged up from the sea by an anchor. Yamada Asaemon Shugen is selected to go to the island to determine what happened to the other Yamada Asaemon and the officials reveal that they will also be sending Iwagakure shinobi. Meanwhile, in the Tensen's castle on the island, Sagiri wants to find Gabimaru and Mei-san, but Yuzuriha wants to leave. Gabimaru's group encounters Aza Chobei who attacks Gabimaru and although the fight is brutal, Chobei's body continually regenerates after Gabimaru's attacks, leading Mei to surmise that something is wrong with Gabimaru's tao. In a desperate final move to stop Chobei, Gabimaru ignites his body in an attempt to incinerate them both, explaining he has nothing to lose while Chobei still cares about his brother. Realizing that Gabimaru is right, Chobei enters a berserker rage, forcing his body into another frightening transformation to defeat Gabimaru.
15	2	"Reality and Fantasy"; Transliteration: "Utsutsu to Maboroshi" (Japanese: 現(うつつ)と幻)	Yūka Fujiwara, Hajime Ootani & Kaori Makita	Yuka Kuroda & Kaori Makita	Akitsugu Hisagi & Kuniyuki Itō	January 18, 2026
Following his monstrous transformation, Chobei loses sight of who and where he is, and launches a berserk assault towards Gabimaru, who tries to defend himself with his fire ninjutsu. Touma realizes that Chobei has always fought for him and attempts to bring him back to the conscious world, but he is wounded by Chobei in the attempt. The child Mei sees that Gabimaru cannot win and creates a sinkhole swallowing up Chobei and ending the conflict, while also transforming her into her woman form. Sagiri's group exits the Tensen castle, wondering if the island was created by human or divine hands, when they meet the other group returning with an unconscious Gabimaru. The surviving eight expeditioners exchange news of their dramatic adventures after only three days on the island. Gabimaru slowly regains consciousness, but he is still confused, so Sagiri uses her tao to help him recover and together, the group takes shelter in a cave. Meanwhile, Chobei survives and is threatened by a group of mindless Soshin. He easily destroys them all, but he is then confronted by Rien who asks if he was the one who killed Mu Dan.
16	3	"Immutability and Change"; Transliteration: "Fuhen to Henka" (Japanese: 不変と変化)	Kayona Yamada	Kayona Yamada	Rie Nishimura	January 25, 2026
Gabimaru realizes that just using Tao is not enough to defeat the Tensen and he challenges Gantetsusai, Tōma, Shion, and Nurugai to help him gain control of Tao. During the training session, he discovers that with proper focus and concentration, he can use a person's own Tao against them. Elsewhere, Rien realizes that Chobei has blended Tao with the Waitanhua flower to gain his enhanced recuperative powers and tests his abilities by pushing him to use his powers to the limit. Chobei kills Rein, but discovers that he had only fought a clone, and Rein easily renders him unconscious. When he awakes, Chobei sees Rien in female form and she explains that to complete her research, she intends to study him through Bōchū Jutsu. He agrees only if she tells him everything she knows about the island, where she reveals they plan to use the Tao from humans on the mainland to create the elixir of life. Meanwhile, Mei tells Sagiri and Yuzuriha that the island and the Tensen were created by a hermit named Shufu who was attempting to achieve immortality. She and Rien were the first Tensen created, but when Mei discovered Rien was killing humans for their Tao, she was attacked and transformed into a child. As Mei nearly dies due to overuse of Tao, Hoko sacrifices himself by offering his own Tao to heal her.
17	4	"The Samurai Code and Carnage"; Transliteration: "Shidō to Shura" (Japanese: 士道と修羅)	Yasuhiro Geshi	Yasuhiro Geshi	Akitsugu Hisagi, Kuniyuki Itō & Yuriky	February 1, 2026
A follow-up expedition is sent to the island comprising four Yamada Asaemons: the experienced Shugen, the young unranked Kiyomaru, the powerful female instructor Isuzu and Jikku. In addition, four Iwagakure ninjas and 50 ninja subordinates to serve them board the ship. However, each group has their own agenda: Shugen and the Yamada Asaemons to kill the criminals and the Iwagakure to execute the death sentence on Gabimaru. The expedition lands, and they are met on the shore by a group of Shoshin. Shugen offers to fight them all and defeats them bare-handed using his Tao, but he falls to pieces after seeing the dismembered body of Eizen. While he mourns, a Doshi directs a group of Monshin monsters to attack the interlopers. Together the Asaemons and ninjas cut them to pieces while Shugen alone defeats and tortures the Doshi for information. Meanwhile, the survivors now led by Shion are expecting the arrival of a second expedition, but are unsure of their motives. They resolve to find a way off the island together.
18	5	"Human and Sages"; Transliteration: "Hito to Sen'nin" (Japanese: 人と仙人)	Ai Yoshimura	Yasuhiro Geshi	Rie Nishimura & Hinae Saotome	February 9, 2026 (Note: Episode 18 aired at 12:33 a.m. JST, 48 minutes after the regular air time on TV Tokyo and effectively post-midnight.)
Mei provides information to the group about the Horai fortress which is modeled after China's Epang Palace. The only way they can leave the island is in Horai vessels which the sea monsters will not attack. She also informs them that the elixir is located in a laboratory within the Rentan Palace. Shion instructs Gabimaru and Yuzuriha to teach the others how to suppress and enhance their Tao for concealment and combat, then divides them into two teams, the Escape-Route Team and the Elixir Retrieval Team, based on their Tao attributes and chances of success. He also agrees to take Mei with them. The Elixir Team of Gabimaru and Yuzuriha infiltrates the fortress with Sagiri and Mei, and heads for the palace which contains the Banko, an enormous Waitanhua flower that extracts Tao from human sacrifices. As Gabimaru uses his Tao to survey the area in the darkness, he senses Ran, who appears before them. Ran explains that he knew of their intentions through his dissection of Toma who senses his brother's presence. Meanwhile, the Escape-Route Team has become separated. Ran tells Gabimaru that the Tensen sages intend to hold the Hekiji Fukusho ritual (Rite of Just Consumption), offering humans possessing high quality Tao produce Tan that does not turn recipients into plants. Gabimaru realizes their plan not to engage Tensen in combat has come undone.
19	6	"Hindering and Restoration"; Transliteration: "Sōkoku to Aioi" (Japanese: 相克と相生)	Masahiro Mukai	Hiroshi Hamasaki	Akitsugu Hisagi & Kuniyuki Itō	February 15, 2026
When Gabimaru realizes their plan to avoid fighting the Tensen has failed, he prepares to battle Ran with Yuzuriha and sends Sagiri and Mei to search for the elixir. However, Mei warns him that they are not in the Rentan Palace, as Ran has restructured the palace before their arrival. Gabimaru commits to fighting Ran, but his and Yuzuriha's attacks have little effect. Regrouping, Gabimaru tries a different strategy, softening his Tao to merge with Tan's much stronger Tao using techniques he synthesized from Nurugai, Yuzuriha, Shion, and Sagiri. With Ran focused on Gabimaru, Yuzuriha seizes the opportunity to slice Ran in half. As Yuzuriha moves in to finish the job, Ran's body begins to sprout flowers and shifts into his Kishikai state. Elsewhere, Rien sees that Ran is being pushed by his opponents, and he realizes that their Tao will enable the Tensen to perform the ritual and complete the Elixir of Life. Meanwhile, having transformed into his powerful Kishikai state, Ran has defeated Gabimaru and Yuzuriha, leaving them badly wounded and near death.
20	7	"Two People and One Person"; Transliteration: "Futari to Hitori" (Japanese: 二人と一人)	Ryōta Hoshikawa	Yuka Kuroda	Akitsugu Hisagi, Rie Nishimura & Hiroyuki Saita	February 22, 2026
At the Bochu Palace, Tamiya Gantetsusai, Aza Toma and Yamada Asaemon Fuchi face Aza Chobei, Ju Fa and Tao Fa. Chobei invites Toma to join him and the Tensen, and Toma approaches them, but suddenly he and Chobei jointly attack and cut Tao Fa to pieces. However, their victory is short-lived as the Tensen soon regenerate themselves. The Aza brothers attack Ju Fa almost as one person with their fully coordinated movements. Meanwhile, Tao Fa assumes her feminine form to disorientate Gantetsusai and Fuchi. She successfully attacks and wounds them with her superior control of Tao which is invisible to them, making her almost unbeatable. Their counter-attacks prove fruitless until Gantetsusai is partially blinded in one eye, enabling him to sense Tao Fa's Tao. Shockingly, he gouges out his good eye with his hook and, almost blind, he launches a solo attack on the Tensen.
21	8	"Chrysanthemum and Peach"; Transliteration: "Kiku to Momo" (Japanese: 菊と桃)	Hajime Ootani	Hajime Ootani	Akitsugu Hisagi & Kuniyuki Itō	March 1, 2026
With one eye missing and almost blinded in the other eye by his own blood, Gantetsusai can sense Tao Fa's Tao. He manages to cut Tao Fa, but it is only when Fuchi grabs the Tensen that his metal Tao attribute counteracts the wood attribute of Tao Fa, that Gantetsusai can slice through her tanden. A flashback shows the special bond between Ju Fa and Tao Fa as they trained, grew, and became adult Tensen, consuming other life forms, including human Hoko to sustain their Tao. Using this bond, the two Tensen combine into a single Kishikai winged plant-like monstrous entity, raining down mind-altering, dandelion-like florets. In desperation, Chobei uses his enhanced powers to attack the combined Tensen, but is unsuccessful, and Fuchi convinces Chobei and Gantetsusai they must work together to defeat the monster. In a post-credits scene, Shugen's group finds remnants of Yamada Asaemons, and vows to kill the "sages" and criminals. Using knowledge gained from the Doshi in interrogation, they take control of a group of Shoshin and ride them towards the Horai.
22	9	"Love and Karma"; Transliteration: "Ji to Gō" (Japanese: 慈と業)	Yasuhiro Geshi & Kayona Yamada	Daisuke Niitsuma & Junichi Yamamoto	Akitsugu Hisagi, Shinji Ito, Hiroyuki Saita & Yuriky	March 8, 2026
The combined Kishikai entity of Ju Fa and Tao Fa rains down deadly spores and tentacles on the intruders, but Chobei uses his own Tensen powers to repel the attack and defend Gantetsusai, Fuchi, and his brother Toma. Suddenly, combining their metal and earth Tao abilities, Toma grabs Fuchi who swings his sword to slice the Kishikai, which then undergoes another transformation into a defensive mode. Gantetsusai makes an almost suicidal attack on the Kishikai, taking even more damage to his body, but his Gatecleaver strike splits the Kishikai back into Ju Fa and Tao Fa. This enables Chobei, Fuchi and Toma to cut their separate tandens before they can recombine, finally destroying them. Meanwhile, in Rentan Palace Gui Fa explains to Sagiri that the Tensen's plan is to deliver a multitude of butterflies infected with a "starter" to the mainland (Wakoku), which will infect humans and turn them into Waitanhua flowers. They will then combine into Banko, the god-beast, to refine the perfect Tan that Rien seeks: humans being more useful than the Hoko on the island. At the same time, Shion, backed by Nurugai, has been fighting the androgynous Zhu Jin who killed Tenza, cutting the Tensen to pieces over a hundred times to exhaust its ability to regenerate, however, he is close to exhaustion and collapses himself.
23	10	"Master and Student"; Transliteration: "Shi to Deshi" (Japanese: 師と弟子)	Kaori Makita	Kaori Makita	Akitsugu Hisagi & Rie Nishimura	March 15, 2026
Both Shion and Zhu Jin, are close to their limits of endurance, but they continue to search for openings to defeat each other. Shion thinks back to his childhood when after being born blind, he travelled with his mother, earning money by challenging adults to strike him with a wooden sword while using his Tao to dodge their blows. Zhu Jin attempts to transform into its Kishikai form to convince Shion that it is still able to fight, but Shion sees through the subterfuge and pierces its tanden with his sword. Zhu Jin then uses tendrils to pierce Shion's body, but Shion holds his ground and sends a reluctant Nurugai to find the others of their group. Nurugai leaves, but returns and grabs Shion, telling him that his student Tenza willingly gave his life to save them both, and that Shion should not throw away his own life needlessly. Convinced by Nurugai's argument, they leave the dying Zhu Jin and prepare to join the remainder of their party.
24	11	"Ephemeralness and Fire"; Transliteration: "Hakanasa to Hi" (Japanese: 儚(はかなさ)と火)	Masahiro Mukai	Masahiro Mukai	Akitsugu Hisagi, Shinji Ito & Hiroyuki Saita	March 23, 2026 (Note: Episode 24 aired at 12:40 a.m. JST, 55 minutes after the regular air time on TV Tokyo and effectively post-midnight.)
The episode opens with Gabimaru and Yuzuriha badly injured following their battle with Ran, and Gabimaru recalls how important it is to return to his wife Yui. Using information he gained from Mei, he stabs Mu Dan's Kishikai stinger into his arm, enabling his body to regenerate through the powers of the Flower Tao. Despite recovering from his injuries, Gabimaru realizes that his Fire Tao is ineffective against Ran's Water Tao. He and tells Yuzuriha that they must rely on her Earth Tao to defeat him, and the two shinobi then unleash a range of ninjutsu techniques. This prolongs the battle until Ran's Tao is fully exhausted, causing his Kishikai from to crack and disintegrate. With Ran now reduced to a vulnerable human form, Gabimaru raises Yuzuriha into the air to avoid Ran's barrage of deadly spikes, enabling her to strike at Ran's tanden, causing the Tensen to disintegrate. Realizing she is mortally wounded, Yuzuriha instructs Gabimaru to leave her while she recovers her strength. She then quietly apologizes to her departed sister for her failure to survive and appears to succumb to her injuries. At the ritual circle, Ran's bottle bursts forth, indicating the defeat of all members of Lord Tensen, and Gui Fa prepares to report to Rien. Suddenly, the palace begins to shake as the Monshin, under the command of Shugen, breach the outer walls.
25	12	"Endings and Beginnings"; Transliteration: "Tsui to Hajime" (Japanese: 終と始)	Ai Yoshimura & Iho Ishikawa	Akitsugu Hisagi	Akitsugu Hisagi, Rie Nishimura & Yuriky	March 29, 2026
The dispersed survivors from the first expedition head separately to the sluice gates in an attempt to leave the island, knowing they need at least five to manage a boat. Shugen instructs the ninja to eliminate anyone they come across, with the exception of the Yamada Asaemon. However, the Iwagakure ninja have their own agenda, including a young female ninja who plans to assassinate Gabimaru and take his position as the next "Gabimaru the Hollow". At the sluice gates, Rien learns from Gui Fa that the Tensen have been defeated, the Rite of Just Consumption has failed, and that a new group of humans is approaching, so he orders the Doshi to counterattack while speeding up preparations to sail to the mainland. A battle then ensues between the ninja and the Doshi, with the first expedition survivors caught in the middle. Sagiri and Mei find themselves surrounded by both Doshi and Iwagakure shinobi, but a rejuvenated Yuzuriha surprisingly appears and saves them. As the fighting subsides, the ninja and Doshi effectively neutralize each other. However, the survivors are confronted by the new Asaemon who have orders to execute the criminals, not realizing that the first Asaemon and the criminals had to cooperate to survive. Meanwhile, Zhu Jin's severed head is carried by an underwater current to where it reaches and fuses with the Banko, bringing it to life.

== Home media release ==
=== Japanese ===
Twin Engine (Japan – Region 2/A)
Vol.	Episodes	Front cover character(s)	Back cover character(s)	Release date	Ref.
1	14–17	Gabimaru	Aza Chōbei	April 22, 2026	
2	18–21	Rien	Shugen	May 27, 2026	
3	22–25	Yuzuriha	Shion	June 24, 2026	
