= List of Hell's Paradise episodes =

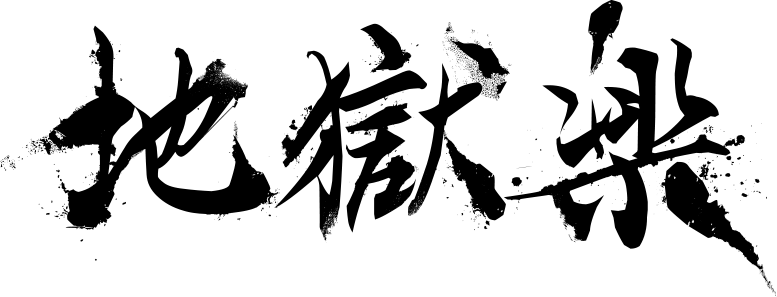

Hell's Paradise is an anime television series based on the manga series Hell's Paradise: Jigokuraku by Yuji Kaku. In November 2022, an anime adaptation of the manga was announced by Crunchyroll. The story follows ninja Gabimaru and executioner Yamada Asaemon Sagiri as they search for the elixir of life. The series is animated by MAPPA and produced by Twin Engine, with series direction by Kaori Makita. Akira Kindaichi wrote the scripts, Koji Hisaki designed the characters, and Yoshiaki Dewa composed the music. The first season consisted of 13 episodes and aired from April 1 to July 1, 2023, on TV Tokyo and its affiliates. Crunchyroll streamed the series internationally outside of Asia, while Netflix streamed the series in Asia-Pacific (excluding Mainland China, Australia, and New Zealand). It adapted the manga's "Island" and "Lord Tensen" story arcs.

Immediately following the conclusion of the first season, a second season was announced. The season is adapting the manga's "Lord Tensen" and "Hōrai" story arcs, and aired from January 11 to March 29, 2026, with most cast and staff from the first season reprising their roles.

== Series overview ==
Season	Episodes	Originally released	
Season	Episodes	First released	Last released
1	13	April 1, 2023	July 1, 2023
2	12	January 11, 2026	March 29, 2026

== Episodes ==
=== Season 1 (2023) ===
No. overall	No. in season	Title	Directed by (Note: Production staff information is taken from the ending credits of each episode.)	Storyboarded by	Chief animation directed by	Original release date
1	1	"The Death Row Convict and the Executioner"; Transliteration: "Shizaijin to Shikkōnin" (Japanese: 死罪人と執行人)	Kaori Makita	Kaori Makita	Akitsugu Hisagi	April 1, 2023
2	2	"Screening and Choosing"; Transliteration: "Senbetsu to Sentaku" (Japanese: 選別と選択)	Yasuhiro Geshi	Kazuki Akane	Akitsugu Hisagi & Ryōta Arima	April 8, 2023
3	3	"Weakness and Strength"; Transliteration: "Yowasa to Tsuyosa" (Japanese: 弱さと強さ)	Kayona Yamada	Soji Ninomiya	Akitsugu Hisagi & Ryōta Arima	April 15, 2023
4	4	"Hell and Paradise"; Transliteration: "Jigoku to Gokuraku" (Japanese: 地獄と極楽)	Tetsuya Wakano	Tetsuya Wakano	Akitsugu Hisagi, Ryōta Arima & Datto-kun	April 22, 2023
5	5	"The Samurai and the Woman"; Transliteration: "Samurai to Onna" (Japanese: 侍と女)	Shū Watanabe	Shigeyuki Miya	Akitsugu Hisagi & Ryōta Arima	April 29, 2023
6	6	"Heart and Reason"; Transliteration: "Kokoro to Kotowari" (Japanese: 心と理(ことわり))	Yasuhiro Geshi	Yasuhiro Geshi	Akitsugu Hisagi & Ryōta Arima	May 6, 2023
7	7	"Flowers and Offerings"; Transliteration: "Hana to Nie" (Japanese: 花と贄)	Kento Shintani	Risako Yoshida	Akitsugu Hisagi & Ryōta Arima	May 13, 2023
8	8	"Student and Master"; Transliteration: "Deshi to Shi" (Japanese: 弟子と師)	Fumito Yamada	Kaori Makita	Akitsugu Hisagi & Ryōta Arima	May 20, 2023
9	9	"Gods and People"; Transliteration: "Kami to Hito" (Japanese: 神と人)	Ryūta Yamamoto	Jun Shishido	Akitsugu Hisagi & Ryōta Arima	June 3, 2023
10	10	"Yin and Yang"; Transliteration: "In to Yō" (Japanese: 陰と陽)	Tarō Kubo & Yūki Nishihata	Tetsuya Wakano	Akitsugu Hisagi & Ryōta Arima	June 10, 2023
11	11	"Weak and Strong"; Transliteration: "Jakui to Tsuyoi" (Japanese: 弱イと強イ)	Yasuhiro Geshi	Shigeyuki Miya	Akitsugu Hisagi & Ryōta Arima	June 17, 2023
12	12	"Umbrella and Ink"; Transliteration: "Kasa to Sumi" (Japanese: 傘と墨)	Teruyuki Ōmine	Jun Shishido	Akitsugu Hisagi & Ryōta Arima	June 24, 2023
13	13	"Dreams and Reality"; Transliteration: "Yume to Utsutsu" (Japanese: 夢と現(うつつ))	Kaori Makita & Yasuhiro Geshi	Jun Shishido & Teruyuki Ōmine	Akitsugu Hisagi & Ryōta Arima	July 1, 2023

=== Season 2 (2026) ===
No. overall	No. in season	Title	Directed by	Storyboarded by	Chief animation directed by	Original release date
14	1	"Dawn and Confusion"; Transliteration: "Reimei to Konmei" (Japanese: 黎明と昏迷)	Kaori Makita	Kaori Makita	Akitsugu Hisagi & Rie Nishimura	January 11, 2026
15	2	"Reality and Fantasy"; Transliteration: "Utsutsu to Maboroshi" (Japanese: 現(うつつ)と幻)	Yūka Fujiwara, Hajime Ootani & Kaori Makita	Yuka Kuroda & Kaori Makita	Akitsugu Hisagi & Kuniyuki Itō	January 18, 2026
16	3	"Immutability and Change"; Transliteration: "Fuhen to Henka" (Japanese: 不変と変化)	Kayona Yamada	Kayona Yamada	Rie Nishimura	January 25, 2026
17	4	"The Samurai Code and Carnage"; Transliteration: "Shidō to Shura" (Japanese: 士道と修羅)	Yasuhiro Geshi	Yasuhiro Geshi	Akitsugu Hisagi, Kuniyuki Itō & Yuriky	February 1, 2026
18	5	"Human and Sages"; Transliteration: "Hito to Sen'nin" (Japanese: 人と仙人)	Ai Yoshimura	Yasuhiro Geshi	Rie Nishimura & Hinae Saotome	February 9, 2026 (Note: Episode 18 aired at 12:33 a.m. JST, 48 minutes after the regular air time on TV Tokyo and effectively post-midnight.)
19	6	"Hindering and Restoration"; Transliteration: "Sōkoku to Aioi" (Japanese: 相克と相生)	Masahiro Mukai	Hiroshi Hamasaki	Akitsugu Hisagi & Kuniyuki Itō	February 15, 2026
20	7	"Two People and One Person"; Transliteration: "Futari to Hitori" (Japanese: 二人と一人)	Ryōta Hoshikawa	Yuka Kuroda	Akitsugu Hisagi, Rie Nishimura & Hiroyuki Saita	February 22, 2026
21	8	"Chrysanthemum and Peach"; Transliteration: "Kiku to Momo" (Japanese: 菊と桃)	Hajime Ootani	Hajime Ootani	Akitsugu Hisagi & Kuniyuki Itō	March 1, 2026
22	9	"Love and Karma"; Transliteration: "Ji to Gō" (Japanese: 慈と業)	Yasuhiro Geshi & Kayona Yamada	Daisuke Niitsuma & Junichi Yamamoto	Akitsugu Hisagi, Shinji Ito, Hiroyuki Saita & Yuriky	March 8, 2026
23	10	"Master and Student"; Transliteration: "Shi to Deshi" (Japanese: 師と弟子)	Kaori Makita	Kaori Makita	Akitsugu Hisagi & Rie Nishimura	March 15, 2026
24	11	"Ephemeralness and Fire"; Transliteration: "Hakanasa to Hi" (Japanese: 儚(はかなさ)と火)	Masahiro Mukai	Masahiro Mukai	Akitsugu Hisagi, Shinji Ito & Hiroyuki Saita	March 23, 2026 (Note: Episode 24 aired at 12:40 a.m. JST, 55 minutes after the regular air time on TV Tokyo and effectively post-midnight.)
25	12	Transliteration: "Tsui to Hajime" (Japanese: 終と始)	TBA	TBA	TBA	March 29, 2026

== Home media release ==
=== Japanese ===
Twin Engine (Japan – Region 2/A)
Vol.	Episodes	Front cover character(s)	Back cover character(s)	Release date	Ref.
Season 1
1	1–6	Gabimaru and Yamada Asaemon Sagiri	Aza Tōma and Aza Chōbei	October 4, 2023	
2	7–13	Shion, Yamada Asaemon Tenza and Nurugai	Yamada Asaemon Senta and Yuzuriha	October 25, 2023	
Season 2
1	14–17	Gabimaru	Aza Chōbei	TBA	
2	18–21	TBA			
3	22–25	TBA			

=== English ===
==== Season 1 ====
Crunchyroll, LLC (North America – Region 1/A)
Season	Episodes	Release date	Ref.
1	1–13	August 27, 2024	
