= Hell's Paradise season 2 (soundtrack) =

Soundtrack album by Yoshiaki Dewa
- Released: February 27, 2026
- Length: 31:26
- Labels: Fujipacific; Milan
- Producer: Yoshiaki Dewa

Yoshiaki Dewa chronology
Hell's Paradise season 1 (soundtrack) (2023)	Hell's Paradise season 2 (soundtrack) (2026)

Hell's Paradise - Season 2 (Original Series Soundtrack) (TVアニメ『地獄楽』第二期オリジナル・サウンドトラック TV Anime Jigokuraku dainiki Prijinaru Saundotorakku) is the soundtrack to the second season of the 2023 TV anime series Hell's Paradise. It was composed by Yoshiaki Dewa, and released on February 27, 2026, by Fujipacific Music Inc., and Milan Records.

== Track listing ==
No.	Title	Length
1.	"Hell's Paradise II"	3:24
2.	"The Empty Shells"	1:49
3.	"Shenxian Thought"	1:38
4.	"Too Righteous"	2:36
5.	"The Silent Fangs"	2:10
6.	"KISHIKAI"	3:08
7.	"GOCHISOUSAMA"	2:08
8.	"OTEMAE"	1:52
9.	"The Convert Action"	2:47
10.	"YIN"	2:04
11.	"The Cauldron"	1:50
12.	"Discard the Scabbard."	2:21
13.	"Simplicity"	1:28
14.	"MUSUBI"	2:11
Total length:		31:26
