= List of Hell's Paradise: Jigokuraku characters =

Main cast of the series. From left to right: Yuzuriha, Chōbei, Gabimaru, Sagiri (first row), Shion (top right) and Tōma (back)

The Hell's Paradise: Jigokuraku manga series features an extensive cast of fictional characters created by Yuji Kaku. The manga was serialized in 127 chapters in Shueisha's Shōnen Jump+ app from January 2018 to January 2021, and was collected in 13 tankōbon volumes. The series was adapted as a 13-episode anime television series produced by Twin Engine, broadcast on TV Tokyo and its affiliates between April 1 and July 1, 2023. Crunchyroll streamed the adaptation internationally outside of Asia, while Netflix streamed it in Asia-Pacific.

The series takes place in the Edo period and follows shinobi Gabimaru, who can use special techniques and abilities in combat and the executioner Yamada Asaemon Sagiri as they search for the Elixir of Life.

== Concept and creation ==
Manga creator Yuji Kaku developed the characters of Hell's Paradise with the thought of how conflicted human relationships and modern ethics would function in the setting of Japan's Edo period. The character creation for Hell's Paradise stemmed from a simple, core framework: "several pairs of people whose interests aren't aligned [are] thrown into an enclosed space and forced to work together". With that concept in mind, Kaku thought of multiple ways to implement that idea, initially starting with lawyers defending a group of kids in a youth detention center. Ultimately, Kaku settled on having convicts and executioners trapped on an island. In an interview with Crunchyroll, Kaku stated, "Despite condemned criminals and executioners being difficult characters to empathize with, if they share our perspective, then we feel close to them."

Kaku realized themes had shifted more towards the Middle Way doctrine, with the paradoxes and conflict. Central characters were designed with backstories that made them relatable to modern audiences, despite being criminals and executioners, in order to make them feel "unique" within the historical time frame. Kaku deliberately made Gabimaru a married protagonist, which he saw as "unique" in shonen manga. He explained that he needed a strong, immediate motivation for his hero to fight to survive, making Gabimaru's wife his core driving force. In his explanation of how he approached the character designs, Kaku noted "Designing characters isn't unpleasant, and I try to express the character's personality through their design. Reality is different, but in manga, I think there's a firm connection between the inside and outside. [I] talked about that with Miura-sensei as well. I deliberately try give important characters strong designs." When asked "what do you think makes Gabimaru the protagonist of this story?" Kaku noted Gabimaru and Sagiri had the same values as people living in the 2020s. He incorporated multiple symbolisms into the characters, from Japanese mythology and folklore, to Taoism and Buddhism.

== Main characters ==
=== Gabimaru ===
Voiced by: Chiaki Kobayashi (Japanese); Alejandro Saab (English)
Portrayed by: Tsubasa Kizu

Gabimaru (画眉丸) is a ninja from Iwagakure village, where he was taken from his parents as a child by the village chief and trained to become a killer. He is known as "Gabimaru the Hollow" (がらんの画眉丸, Garan no Gabimaru) for him being the strongest in the village. He fell in love with his wife, the village chief's daughter who treated him with kindness. When he wanted to cut ties with the village and live a normal life with her, the chief arranged for him to be captured and sentenced to death.

=== Sagiri ===
Voiced by: Yumiri Hanamori (Japanese); Marisa Duran (English)
Portrayed by: Ayana Shiramoto

Sagiri (佐切) is a master swordswoman from the famed Yamada Asaemon family of executioners, where she is one of the only two female executioners in the clan. She recruits Gabimaru for the expedition after seeing his talent and strong will to live. Sagiri is ranked last (12th), in the Yamada Asaemon hierarchy.

== Vanguard Party ==
The Vanguard Party are the death-row criminals the Shogunate chose to embark on the journey to retrieve the Elixir of Life from Shinsenkyo with an assigned Yamada Asaemon executioner.

=== Yuzuriha ===
Voiced by: Rie Takahashi (Japanese); Jill Harris (English)
Portrayed by: Yūri Ōta

Yuzuriha (杠) is a self-centered female ninja whose known as "Yuzuriha of Keishu" (傾主の杠, Keishu no Yuzuriha).

=== Aza Chōbei ===
Voiced by: Ryōhei Kimura, Minami Hinata (young) (Japanese); Nazeeh Tarsha, Brittney Karbowski (young) (English)
Portrayed by: Yūnosuke Matsushima (first play), Hiroki Sana (second play)

Aza Chōbei (亜左 弔兵衛) is the reckless leader of a gang of bandits in Iyo Province, and Toma's older brother.

=== Tamiya Gantetsusai ===
Voiced by: Tetsu Inada, Yukihiro Nozuyama (young) (Japanese); Phil Parsons (English)
Portrayed by: Naoya Gо̄moto

Tamiya Gantetsusai (民谷 巌鉄斎) is a famous master swordsman on death row who is known as "Blade Dragon" (剣龍). Despite being somewhat lecherous and shallow, Gantetsusai's swordsmanship is unparalleled, as he can match many of the Yamada Asaemons in a duel. After the Shinsenkyo expedition, he is pardoned by the Shogunate and opens a kenjutsu dojo/medical clinic, the latter being a tribute to his executioner Fuchi.

=== Nurugai ===
Voiced by: Makoto Koichi (Japanese); Cassie Ewulu (English)
Portrayed by: Azusa Yoshihama

Nurugai (ヌルガイ) is the last of the Sanka people. Nurugai was put on death row after she accidentally lured Shogunate samurai to her village—as the Sanka were a symbol of rebellion against the Shogunate, despite living normally. Due to her physique and behavior, she is often mistaken for a boy.

=== Rokurōta ===
Voiced by: Hinata Tadokoro (Japanese); Ray Hurd (English)

Rokurōta (陸郎太) is a fearsomely large and strong criminal. Nicknamed "The Giant of Bizen" (備前の巨人, Bizen no Kyojin), Rokurōta is a mentally undeveloped man as he possesses the mind of a baby—as he is unable to speak and cry as such when he is hungry. He is feared for his immense strength, having killed many people with his bare hands, often with a single strike, including his parents, several villagers, and Yamada Asaemons Eizen and Genji. Following an intense fight with Gabimaru and Sagiri, Rokurōta gets beheaded by the latter.

== Yamada Asaemon ==
The Yamada Asaemon (山田浅ェ門) is a prestigious kenjutsu dojo in Edo. It trains sword testers to become fully-fledged executioners for the Shogunate. Once fully trained, each swordsman has their name preceded by the title "Yamada Asaemon".

=== Aza Tōma ===
Voiced by: Kensho Ono (Japanese); Matt Shipman (English)
Portrayed by: Rui Tabuchi

Tōma executioner assigned to Chōbei. He infiltrated the Yamada Asaemon in order to free Chōbei, who is his older brother and his real name is Aza Tōma (亜左 桐馬).

=== Fuchi ===
Voiced by: Aoi Ichikawa (Japanese); Justin Briner (English)
Portrayed by: Yū Miyazaki

Fuchi (付知) is the executioner assigned to Gantetsusai. He has a blond bob cut, a high level of medical knowledge, and is ranked 9th in the Yamada Asaemon hierarchy.

=== Shion ===
Voiced by: Chikahiro Kobayashi (Japanese); Reagan Murdock (English)
Portrayed by: Tarо̄ Nakamura

Shion (士遠) is the executioner assigned to Akaginu. He is blind and ranked 4th in the Yamada Asaemon hierarchy.

=== Senta ===
Voiced by: Daiki Yamashita (Japanese); Jordan Dash Cruz (English)
Portrayed by: Satoru Mori

Senta (仙汰) is the 5th ranked executioner assigned to Yuzuriha. He is studious, chubby, and wears glasses. He originally wanted to be an artist but was forced to train and become a Yamada Asaemon. He hated having to kill people, which is why he turned to the study of religions and he becomes captivated by Yuzuriha's freedom of spirit.

=== Shugen ===
Voiced by: Ryōta Suzuki, Ayumi Yamazaki (young) (Japanese); Landon McDonald, Reshel Mae (young) (English)
Portrayed by: Koji Kominami

Shugen (殊現) is the leader of the second team sent to acquire the elixir after the Shogunate becomes impatient with the first. He is ranked 2nd in the Yamada Asaemon hierarchy.

=== Jikka ===
Voiced by: Kōji Yusa (Japanese); SungWon Cho (English)
Portrayed by: Gaku Matsuda

Jikka (十禾) is the 3rd ranked Asaemon who's known to be the laziest of the clan, who joins the second expedition.

=== Isuzu ===
Voiced by: Sayaka Ōhara (Japanese); Kara Edwards (English)

Isuzu (威鈴) is Genji's little sister and an unranked Asaemon in the Yamada clan. She was chosen to join Shugen and Jikka as part of the second team sent to acquire the elixir.

=== Kiyomaru ===
Voiced by: Maaya Uchida (Japanese); Elizabeth Hohman (English)

Kiyomaru (清丸) is an unranked Asaemon child, who was chosen to join Shugen and Jikka as part of the second team sent to acquire the elixir.

=== Tenza ===
Voiced by: Yūsuke Kobayashi (Japanese); Ben Balmaceda (English)
Portrayed by: Yūta Iiyama

Tenza (典坐) is the executioner assigned to Nurugai. He is ranked 10th in the Yamada Asaemon hierarchy.

=== Genji ===
Voiced by: Volcano Ōta (Japanese); Gabe Kunda (English)

Genji (源嗣) is the 8th ranked executioner assigned to Moro Makiya.

=== Eizen ===
Voiced by: Makoto Furukawa (Japanese); Cody Savoie (English)

Eizen (衛善) is the 1st ranked executioner and the head of the Yamada Asaemon during the first expedition, assigned as Rokurōta's executioner.

=== Kishō ===
Voiced by: Shun'ichi Toki (Japanese); Bradley Gareth (English)

Kishō (期聖) is the 11th ranked executioner assigned to Warped Keiun.

== Shinsenkyo ==
Shinsenkyo (神仙郷, Shinsenkyō), also known as Kotaku (こたく), is an island located within the southwest seas that is far beyond the Ryukyu Kingdom. The island is inhabited by monsters and had been said to possess the legendary Elixir of Life, which had been sought out by humans for centuries.

=== Lord Tensen ===
Voiced by: Junichi Suwabe (Japanese); Ian Sinclair (Yang Form) (English)
Voiced by: Yūko Kaida (Japanese); Michelle Rojas (Yin Form) (English)
Portrayed by: Kensuke Takahashi (first play), Yoshihide Sasaki and Riona Tatemichi (second play)

The Tensen are powerful beings living in the Horai at the center of the island who have mastered the five levels of Tao, culminating in their ability to use qi to shift between yin and yang, female and male humanoid forms. Through the use of the elixir which they call Tan, their plant-like bodies are able to regenerate themselves, making them virtually immortal. They are served by Doshi, sentient half-human beings who are on the path to mastering Tao, and are a level above the mindless Soshin, who are monsters with the appearance of various deities and attack anyone who arrives on the island. Rien (蓮) is the leader of the group, while the other members are called Zhu Jin (朱槿), Mu Dan (牡丹), Ran (蘭), Gui Fa (桂花), Tao Fa (桃花) and Ju Fa (菊花).

=== Mei ===
Voiced by: Konomi Kohara (Japanese); Macy Anne Johnson (English)
Portrayed by: Rio Sawada and Aoba Kо̄jо̄

Mei (メイ) is a mysterious little girl with limited ability to speak who lives on the island. She has the powers of the Tensen but has been used by the yang Doshi as a yin sexual "training partner" against her will for centuries.

=== Hōko ===
Voiced by: Chō (Japanese); Jim Foronda (English)

Hōko (木人) is the last living member of the Hōko, a race of immortals that once inhabited Eishū, the outer layers of the island. Hōko's entire body was made up of tree bark due to the effects of the arborification taking over his former body.

== Iwagakure ==
Iwagakure, meaning Village Hidden in Stones (石隠の里, Iwagakure no Sato) was a well-known shinobi village in Japan until its termination by the shogun.

=== Iwagakure Chief ===
Voiced by: Mugihito (Japanese); Bill Jenkins (English)

The chief is the merciless leader of Iwagakure, as well as the father of Yui.

=== Yui ===
Voiced by: Mamiko Noto (Japanese); Skyler McIntosh (English)

Yui (結) is the eighth daughter of the Village Chief and Gabimaru's wife.

=== Shija ===
Voiced by: Ayumu Murase (Japanese); Hayden Daviau (English)

Shija (シジャ) is a Iwagakure shinobi chosen to potentially succeed Gabimaru in the alias Gabimaru and position as number one Iwagakure shinobi.

=== Ginkakubō ===
Ginkakubō (銀閣坊) is a jōnin-class shinobi of Iwagakure, who uses the Transformation Jutsu to impersonate others.

=== Kumokiri ===
Voiced by: Taito Ban (Japanese); Sean Letourneau (English)

Kumokiri (雲霧) is a jōnin-class shinobi of Iwagakure, who uses ninjutsu to manipulate his hair or nearby rocks.
