= Hell's Paradise (TV series) =

Japanese anime television series

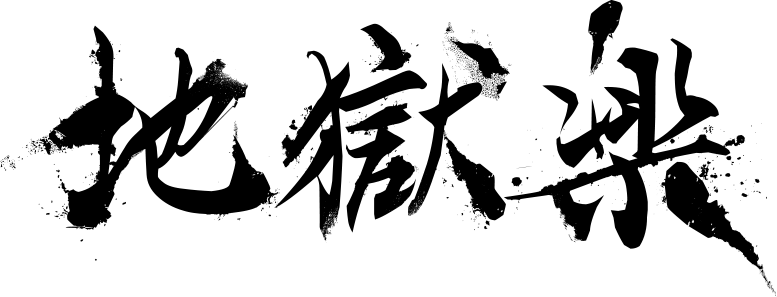
- Also known as: Hell's Paradise: Jigokuraku
- 地獄楽; Jigokuraku
- Genre: Action; Dark fantasy; Psychological thriller
- Based on: Hell's Paradise: Jigokuraku by Yuji Kaku
- Screenplay by: Akira Kindaichi
- Directed by: Kaori Makita
- Voices of: Chiaki Kobayashi; Yumiri Hanamori; Rie Takahashi; Ryōhei Kimura; Tetsu Inada; Makoto Koichi
- Music by: Yoshiaki Dewa
- Opening theme: List: "Work" by Ringo Sheena & Millennium Parade (S1); "Kasuka na Hana" by Tatsuya Kitani feat. Babymetal (S2)
- Ending theme: List: "Kamihitoe" by Uru (S1); "Personal" by Queen Bee (S2)
- Country of origin: Japan
- Original language: Japanese
- No. of seasons: 2
- No. of episodes: 25 (list of episodes)

Production
- Producers: Nozomi Ishii (S1); Kirito Iwashita (S2); Kenta Oda (S2)
- Cinematography: Hyo Gyu Park (S1); Chika Toda (S2)
- Animator: MAPPA
- Editor: Mutsumi Takemiya
- Running time: 24 minutes
- Production company: Twin Engine

Original release
- Network: TV Tokyo
- Release: April 1, 2023 – March 29, 2026

Hell's Paradise (Note: Japanese: 地獄楽, Hepburn: Jigokuraku) is a Japanese anime television series produced by Twin Engine, animated by MAPPA, and directed by Kaori Makita. It is based on the manga series Hell's Paradise: Jigokuraku by Yuji Kaku. The series stars voice actors Chiaki Kobayashi as Gabimaru along with Yumiri Hanamori, Rie Takahashi, Ryōhei Kimura, Tetsu Inada, and Makoto Koichi. It follows the infamous ninja Gabimaru and executioner Yamada Asaemon Sagiri as they search for the elixir of life, upon orders from the shogunate.

The first season premiered on TV Tokyo and its TX Network affiliates from April to July 2023, and garnered critical acclaim in both Japan and the West, with critics praising the elements set within the dystopian environment. A second season aired on the same network and affiliates from January to March 2026. Crunchyroll streams the series internationally outside of Asia, while Netflix streams it in most countries in the Asia-Pacific region.

Critics praised Hell's Paradise for its character-building, action, animation, visuals, and humor. Reviewers had also commented on characters' backstories.

== Plot ==
The story follows ninja Gabimaru being sentenced to execution, but nothing seems to kill him due to his superhuman-like body. Gabimaru believes his love for his wife is what subconsciously keeps him alive. Executioner Yamada Asaemon Sagiri offers him the chance to be pardoned of all crimes by the Shogunate if he finds the elixir of life on Shinsenkyo, a legendary realm recently discovered southwest of the Ryukyu Kingdom. After losing five expedition teams sent to the island, this time the Shogunate sends a group of death row convicts. The convicts are each given a Yamada Asaemon executioner, who they must return with in order to obtain the pardon.

== Series overview ==
Season	Episodes	Originally released	
Season	Episodes	First released	Last released
1	13	April 1, 2023	July 1, 2023
2	12	January 11, 2026	March 29, 2026

== Cast and characters ==
Character	Japanese	English
Gabimaru (画眉丸)	Chiaki Kobayashi	Alejandro Saab
Sagiri (佐切)	Yumiri Hanamori	Marisa Duran
Yuzuriha (杠)	Rie Takahashi	Jill Harris
Aza Chōbei (亜左 弔兵衛)	Ryōhei Kimura	Nazeeh Tarsha
Tamiya Gantetsusai (民谷 巌鉄斎)	Tetsu Inada	Phil Parsons
Nurugai (ヌルガイ)	Makoto Koichi	Cassie Ewulu
Rokurota (六呂田)	Hinata Tadokoro	Ray Hurd
Tōma (桐馬)	Kensho Ono	Matt Shipman
Fuchi (付知)	Aoi Ichikawa	Justin Briner
Shion (士遠)	Chikahiro Kobayashi	Reagan Murdock
Senta (仙汰)	Daiki Yamashita	Jordan Dash Cruz
Shugen (殊現)	Ryōta Suzuki	Landon McDonald
Jikka (ジッカ)	Kōji Yusa	SungWon Cho
Isuzu (威鈴)	Sayaka Ohara	Kara Edwards
Kiyomaru (清丸)	Maaya Uchida	Elizabeth Hohman
Tenza (典坐)	Yūsuke Kobayashi	Ben Balmaceda
Eizen (衛善)	Makoto Furukawa	Cody Savoie
Kishō (期聖)	Shun'ichi Toki	Bradley Gareth
Genji (源嗣)	Volcano Ōta	Gabe Kunda
Lord Tensen (てんせん様)	Junichi Suwabe (Yang form), Yūko Kaida (Yin form)	Ian Sinclair (Yang Form), Michelle Rojas (Yin Form)
Mei (メイ)	Konomi Kohara	Macy Anne Johnson
Hōko (木人)	Chō	Jim Foronda
Iwagakure Chief (石隠衆長 おさ)	Mugihito	Bill Jenkins
Yui (ユイ)	Mamiko Noto	Skyler McIntosh

== Release ==
=== Season 1 ===
In November 2022, Crunchyroll announced an anime adaptation based on the manga series Hell's Paradise: Jigokuraku by Yuji Kaku. The anime series is produced by Twin Engine and MAPPA and directed by Kaori Makita, with Akira Kindaichi writing the scripts, Koji Hisaki designing the characters, and Yoshiaki Dewa composing the music. The first season ran for 13 episodes and aired from April 1 to July 1, 2023, on TV Tokyo and its affiliates.

=== Season 2 ===
Immediately following the conclusion of the first season, a second season was announced. The season aired from January 11 to March 29, 2026, with the cast and staff from the first season reprising their roles.

=== International distribution ===
Crunchyroll streams the series internationally outside of Asia, while Netflix streams it in the Asia-Pacific region (excluding Mainland China, Australia, and New Zealand).

== Music ==
The music for the series is composed by Yoshiaki Dewa and the first original soundtrack album was released digitally on July 19, 2023. In February 2026, the original soundtrack for the second season was released through Fujipacific Music Inc., and Milan Records.

For the first season, the opening theme song is "Work", performed by Ringo Sheena and Millennium Parade, while the ending theme song is "Kamihitoe" (紙一重; lit. 'A Fine Line'), performed by Uru. For the second season, the opening theme song is "Kasuka na Hana" (かすかなはな; lit. 'Faint Flower'), performed by Tatsuya Kitani featuring Babymetal, while the ending theme song is "Personal", performed by Queen Bee.

== Reception ==
=== Critical reception ===
Digital Spy's Ali Griffiths described in his review of the series' premiere that the series makes up a group affectionately known as the "dark trio of shōnen" by anime fans along with Jujutsu Kaisen and Chainsaw Man (coincidentally, all animated by MAPPA) due to their similar tone and themes, especially compared with their peppier peers. Ali praised the show's character-building, action, animation, visuals, humor, and the handling of Gabimaru's versions of his story which tells about "how he's feeling and what he wishes he'd done differently". He felt that some fans might found that the opening episode of the series was a little slow, but stating that "the way it centers the backstory of its protagonist and immediately emphasises the relationship between Gabimaru and Sagiri is emblematic of the kind of character-first action show they're hoping it will be".

MrAJCosplay of Anime News Network reviewed the first three episodes of the series. While praising the anime for its colors, sound design and animation, he described Sagiri's character as 'strong' and was endeared by her ability to see right through Gabimaru's façade. He felt that "her decision regarding walking down the path of an executioner and characterization as a stickler for the rules wasn't the direction he expected the show to go". Her introduction in episodes two and three was considered to be a "little inconsistent", although he needs more time to root her. He also noting that Gabimaru was one of his favorite characters, while he found the character's backstory as "sweet" due to the subversion of his mentality.

Adi Tantimedh of Bleeding Cool in his review of the first two episodes gave them a 8/10, feeling that they had a "stylish opening chapter to a brutal, bloody journey of death and redemption as a ninja is forced to take a suicide mission to find the elixir of eternal life, melding the samurai saga with a supernatural thriller drawing from Japanese folklore". Den of Geek's Daniel Kurland rated the first episode 4 out of 5, writing "quite the bloody affair and is absolutely obsessed with death. That being said, this is far from a callous series. If anything Hell's Paradise doesn't criticize this brutal behavior, but rather emphasizes how there's a right and wrong way to slice off a head and bathe in blood".

=== Accolades ===
The series ranked third in the anime category of Yahoo! Japan Search Awards, based on the number of searches for a particular term compared to the year before. The series was nominated at the 8th Crunchyroll Anime Awards in eight categories: Best New Series, Best Fantasy, Best Art Direction (e-caesar), Best Character Design (Kouji Hisaki), Best Opening Sequence and Best Anime Song ("Work" by Ringo Sheena and Millennium Parade), Best Voice Artist Performance – English (Marisa Duran as Yamada Asaemon Sagiri), and Best Voice Artist Performance – French (Yoan Sover as Gabimaru). It was also nominated for eight categories, including Anime of the Year at the 10th Anime Trending Awards in the same year.

=== Awards and nominations ===
Year	Award	Category	Recipient	Result	Ref.
2023	Yahoo! Japan Search Awards	Anime Category	Hell's Paradise	3rd place	
2024	8th Crunchyroll Anime Awards	Best New Series	Hell's Paradise	Nominated	
2024	8th Crunchyroll Anime Awards	Best Fantasy	Hell's Paradise	Nominated	
2024	8th Crunchyroll Anime Awards	Best Art Direction	e-caesar	Nominated	
2024	8th Crunchyroll Anime Awards	Best Character Design	Kouji Hisaki	Nominated	
2024	8th Crunchyroll Anime Awards	Best Anime Song	"Work" by Ringo Sheena and Millennium Parade	Nominated	
2024	8th Crunchyroll Anime Awards	Best Opening Sequence	"Work" by Ringo Sheena and Millennium Parade	Nominated	
2024	8th Crunchyroll Anime Awards	Best Voice Artist Performance (English)	Marisa Duran as Yamada Asaemon Sagiri	Nominated	
2024	8th Crunchyroll Anime Awards	Best Voice Artist Performance (French)	Yoan Sover as Gabimaru	Nominated	
2024	10th Anime Trending Awards	Anime of The Year	Hell's Paradise	Nominated	
2024	10th Anime Trending Awards	Boy of the Year	Gabimaru	Nominated	
2024	10th Anime Trending Awards	Best in Character Design	Koji Hisaki	Nominated	
2024	10th Anime Trending Awards	Opening Theme Song of the Year	"Work" by Ringo Sheena and Millennium Parade	Nominated	
2024	10th Anime Trending Awards	Ending Theme Song of the Year	"Kamihitoe" by Uru	Nominated	
2024	10th Anime Trending Awards	Action or Adventure Anime of the Year	Hell's Paradise	Nominated	
2024	10th Anime Trending Awards	Supernatural Anime of the Year	Hell's Paradise	Nominated	
2024	10th Anime Trending Awards	Best Voice Acting Performance – Female	Yumiri Hanamori as Yamada Asaemon Sagiri	Nominated	
