= Kasuka na Hana =

2026 single by Tatsuya Kitani featuring Babymetal

Single by Tatsuya Kitani featuring Babymetal

from the album Pure
- Language: Japanese
- Released: January 11, 2026
- Length: 3:07
- Label: Echoes; Sony Japan
- Songwriter: Tatsuya Kitani
- Producer: Tatsuya Kitani

Tatsuya Kitani singles chronology
"Culture" (2025)	"Kasuka na Hana" (2026)	"Hidane" (2026)

Babymetal singles chronology
"Get No Satisfied" (2025)	"Kasuka na Hana" (2026)

Music video
- "Kasuka na Hana" on YouTube

"Kasuka na Hana" (かすかなはな; lit. 'faint flower') is a song by Japanese singer-songwriter Tatsuya Kitani featuring Japanese kawaii metal band Babymetal, released on January 11, 2026 through Echoes and Sony Music Records. It was used as the opening theme song for the second season of the Japanese anime series Hell's Paradise.

== Background and release ==
In December 2025, the Hell's Paradise stage event at Jump Festa 2026 released a trailer for the anime's upcoming second season, previewing the song. Kitani had expressed that the song was "inspired by the image of a flower that embodies both strength and fragility, firmly rooted in the soil while swaying in the wind. He said the song reflects admiration for people who accept uncertainty and continue to move forward while realizing themselves, describing such a way of living as modest, dignified and ideal." The song was released alongside the season on January 11, 2026.

== Charts ==
Chart performance for "Kasuka na Hana"
Chart (2026)	Peak position
Japan (Oricon)	17
Japan Anime Singles (Oricon)	5
Japan Digital Singles (Oricon)	5
Japan Hot 100 (Billboard)	47
Japan Hot Animation (Billboard Japan)	16
