= Tatsuya Kitani =

Japanese singer (born 1996)

- Also known as: Konnichiwa Tanita-san
- Born: 28 February 1996 (age 30)
- Genres: J-pop; alternative rock; funk; R&B; hip hop
- Occupations: Musician; singer; lyricist; composer; arranger; record producer
- Instruments: Vocals; bass guitar; guitar; saxophone
- Years active: 2011–present
- Labels: Karent; Emo, Alternative & Cool; Mastersix Foundation; Echoes
- Member of: Gemn
- Formerly of: Sajou no Hana
- Website: tatsuyakitani.com
- Education: University of Tokyo

Tatsuya Kitani (キタニタツヤ, Kitani Tatsuya; born 28 February 1996) is a Japanese musician, singer, lyricist, composer, and arranger. He is the bassist of the trio band Sajou no Hana. He was also active as a Vocaloid producer under the name of "Konnichiwa Tanita-san" (Hello Tanita-san). The affiliated office is Smile Company, and the affiliated label is Echoes under Sony Music Entertainment Japan. His official fan club is "Club Unreality".

== Biography ==
=== Band era ===
When he was in elementary school, he learned about rock from Asian Kung-Fu Generation, and then fell in love with Vola and the Oriental Machine and 8otto. After graduating from junior high school, he bought a bass and formed a cover band for Asian Kung-Fu Generation with his friends. After that, while producing original music with his band, he realized that he was good at composing and went independent. During that time, he became interested in Vocaloid as well.

In October 2011, he formed the band Hitsuji no Mure wa Warawanai (羊の群れは笑わない).

Later, he joined the Honeybee Light Music Club. He later formed a three-piece band "humanic", being in charge of bass and vocals; They were active until February 2013.

=== As Vocaloid producer, bassist, and composer ===
In May 2014, Kitani began releasing Vocaloid music under the name "Hello Tanita-san", posting his first song, "Kujira to Mercury", featuring Hatsune Miku on Nico Nico Douga. In July 2016, he released his first full-length album, "He's watching from the ceiling", on The Voc@loi M@ster.

In 2016, he began participating in the live performances of Vocaloid producer N-buna and Takeaki Wada as a support bassist. As a composer he belongs to Smile Company and other artists. After that, as a support bassist in the band "Yorushika" formed by n-buna in 2017, he has fully participated in recording and live performances from the beginning to the present.

=== Turned into a singer and formation of Sajou no Hana ===
On 30 March 2017, in commemoration of his Vocaloid song "The Trash Room Sinks into a Rust Color" becoming his first music video to achieve 100,000 views on Nico Nico Douga and being inducted into the site's Hall of Fame, he posted a self-cover under the name Tatsuya Kitani. This was the first time the name Tatsuya Kitani was used in his works, and since then his activities have become prominent as a singer-songwriter.

In the spring of 2018, he graduated from Graduate School of Humanities and Sociology, Faculty of Letters, University of Tokyo and formed the band Sajou no Hana. The band released their debut single "Hoshie" from Warner Bros. Home Entertainment in August, making a major debut. In the same year, on September 26, he released his first album as a singer-songwriter, "I Do (Not) Love You."

On February 16, 2019, he held his first one-man live, "I Do Love You" at Shimokitazawa Mosaic. 11–19 In the same year, on September 25, the album "Seven Girls' H(e)avens" was released.

=== After major debut ===
On August 26, 2020, he made his major debut. By December he announced that he would release a single for four consecutive months. The singles were "Shiromuku", "Cinnamon", "Tousougeki" and "Ghost".

In 2021, the opening theme for the Fuji Television Idaten-tatsu's OP was released on the first day of the airing and Tite Kubo's manga Bleach original art exhibition "Bleach Ex." Theme song "Rapport", Image song "Thanatophobia" In the same year June 12, under the name of Hello Tanita-san, he released an album "In the margin" containing past works as Vocaloid P.

After entering 2022, the tie-up continued, and the Fuji TV serial drama Gossip theme song "Tsumetai Uzu", "Planets". At the same time Asahi Super Dry x The First Take collaboration project tie-up song "chiharu feat. n-buna" from Yorushika was released. On May 25, he released his second major album "BIPOLAR". After that he made a collaboration with Harumaki Gohan in a song called "Moonlight". On November 23 he released a new EP "Scar" featuring Bleach tie-up songs as "Scar", "Thanatophobia" and "Rapport". On July 7, 2023, he released the lead track "Ao No Sumika" of his EP "Where Our Blue Is", which served as the opening theme song for the first 5 episodes in the second season of the anime Jujutsu Kaisen.

In February 2026, Kitani released "Kasuka na Hana", a collaboration with metal band Babymetal, as the opening theme song for the second season of the anime Hell's Paradise.

Kitani is scheduled to release his two studio albums, Dekai and Pure, simultaneously on November 4, 2026.

== Discography ==
- I Do (Not) Love You (2018)
- Seven Girls' H(e)avens (2019)
- Demagog (2020)
- Bipolar (2022)
- Roundabout (2024)
- Dekai (2026)
- Pure (2026)
