= Work (Millennium Parade and Ringo Sheena song) =

Single by Millennium Parade and Ringo Sheena
- A-side: "2045"
- Released: May 17, 2023
- Recorded: 2023
- Length: 3:21
- Label: Ariola Japan
- Songwriters: Yumiko Shiina; Daiki Tsuneta
- Producer: Millennium Parade

Millennium Parade singles chronology
"No Time to Cast Anchor" (2022)	"Work" / "2045" (2023)	"Goldenweek" (2024)

Ringo Sheena singles chronology
"Toogood" (2022)	"Work" / "2045" (2023)	"Je Suis Libre" (2023)

Audio sample
- Millennium Parade and Ringo Sheena – "Work": file; help

Music video
- "Work" on YouTube

"Work" (stylized as "W●RK") is a song by Japanese band Millenium Parade and Japanese singer Ringo Sheena, released on May 17, 2023, through Ariola Japan as the first opening theme for the Hell's Paradise: Jigokuraku (2023) anime television series. The song had peaked at number 5 on Japan's Oricon chart.

== Background and release ==
The song first aired on February 26, 2023. It was later released digitally on April 1 and was later released physically on May 17, alongside "2045" as a double A-side single. "Work" is the opening song for the Hell's Paradise: Jigokuraku anime, performed as a duet by Millennium Parade, the musical project of Daiki Tsuneta, and Ringo Sheena. It serves as the first collaboration between the two.

== Composition ==
The song's TV version spans for a duration of one minute and 30 seconds, whereas the full version lasts for three minutes and 21 seconds. "Work" reflects on the struggles and contradictions of life and work, criticizing the mundane routine of society while urging listeners to break free, explore themselves, and confront both personal flaws and societal norms. It blends introspection with commentary on modern labor, conformity, and existential questions, challenging the idea of a "correct" path in life and celebrating individuality and survival through adversity. In the music video, the opening visuals of the song for Hell's Paradise juxtapose intense motion and stark imagery of characters fighting for survival, symbolizing the constant struggle between life and death, a central theme of the series. Characters shown in combat, movement, and transformation visually mirror the song's existential lyrics about testing oneself and confronting life's challenges. These visuals reinforce the anime's story—death‑row convicts fighting monstrous threats to obtain the elixir of life.

== Music video ==
The music video for "Work" was directed by Yuichi Kodama with the help of Ryuken Sato and Naoki Kaneko, and was produced by Mamoru Inagaki with Mizuki Ohno. The video features both singers in the city, later panning to them on a stage.

== Track listing ==
Digital download and streaming – promotional single
No.	Title	Writer(s)	Producer(s)	Length
1.	"Work"	Ringo Sheena; Daiki Tsuneta	Millennium Parade	3:21

CD single
No.	Title	Writer(s)	Producer(s)	Length
1.	"Work"	Ringo Sheena; Daiki Tsuneta	Daiki Tsuneta	3:21
2.	"2045"	Sheena; Tsuneta	Tsuneta	3:41
Total length:				7:02

- Limited CD+Blu-ray – Millennium Parade Live 2021 "The Millennium Parade", October 4, 2021 Tokyo Garden Theater
1. "Nehan"
2. "Fly with Me"
3. "Bon Dance"
4. "Snip"
5. "Veil"
6. "Www"
7. "Stay!!!"
8. "Philip"
9. "Dark"
10. "Slumberland"
11. "Trepanation"
12. "Plankton"
13. "Lost and Found"
14. "Fireworks and Flying Sparks"
15. "Familia"
16. "U"
17. "Matsuri no Ato"
18. "2992"
19. "Call Me"

== Personnel ==
- Daiki Tsuneta – vocals, guitar, programming
- Ringo Sheena – vocals
- Melraw – horn arrangement
- Jun Miyakawa – synths, organ
- Ayatake Ezaki – synths
- Kazuki Arai – bass
- Yu Seki – drums
- Yu Sasaki – mixing, recording engineer
- Randy Merrill – mastering
- Uni Inoue – recording engineer (Ringo Sheena vocals)

== Reception ==
The song was regarded by Anime Corner as one of the "Top Anime Opening Picks" in Spring 2023. In 2024, the song would be nominated as Best Opening Sequence and Best Anime Song at the 8th Crunchyroll Anime Awards.

=== Accolades ===
Year	Award	Category	Result	Ref.
2024	8th Crunchyroll Anime Awards	Best Anime Song	Nominated	
2024	8th Crunchyroll Anime Awards	Best Opening Sequence	Nominated	

== Charts ==
Chart performance for "Work"
Chart (2023)	Peak position
Japan Hot 100 (Billboard)	26
Japan (Oricon)	5
