= Personal (Queen Bee song) =

Single by Queen Bee
- Language: Japanese
- Released: January 14, 2026
- Length: 4:35
- Label: Ziyoou; Sony Music Associated
- Producer: Queen Bee

Queen Bee singles chronology
"High Flame" (2025)	"Personal" (2026)

Music video
- "Personal" on YouTube

"Personal" is a song by Japanese rock band Queen Bee, released on January 14, 2026, through Ziyoou Records and Sony Music Associated Records. It serves as the ending theme song for the second season of the Japanese anime series Hell's Paradise. A music video directed by Sayaka Nakane premiered alongside the song's release.

== Background ==
The song was originally revealed in a trailer for the second season of the anime television series Hell's Paradise (2023). It was released digitally on January 14, 2026, alongside a music video directed by Sayaka Nakane. The CD single version of the song was scheduled for release in Japan on February 11.

== Reception ==
Debopriyaa Dutta writing for Polygon felt the song "takes an intimate look at the Yui-Gabimaru dynamic, and how Yui’s existence spurs Gabimaru to resist death, even when he’s riddled with existential angst."
