= Ayashimon =

Japanese manga series

- First tankōbon volume cover, featuring Maruo (bottom) and Urara (top)

アヤシモン
- Genre: Supernatural, yakuza
- Manga
- Written by: Yuji Kaku
- Published by: Shueisha
- English publisher: NA: Viz Media
- Imprint: Jump Comics
- Magazine: Weekly Shōnen Jump
- Original run: November 15, 2021 – May 30, 2022
- Volumes: 3
- icon

Ayashimon (アヤシモン) is a Japanese manga series written and illustrated by Yuji Kaku. It was serialized in Shueisha's shōnen manga magazine Weekly Shōnen Jump from November 2021 to May 2022.

== Plot ==
Maruo Kaido (海堂 マルオ, Kaidō Maruo) is an unusually strong boy and an avid manga fan who dreams to be a "manga hero". Repeating the special training that appears in manga that he has read since early age, Maruo became able to break rocks at the age of seven. One day, he meets Urara (ウララ), an oni ayashimon—a kind of yōkai able to shapeshift into humans—chased by an ayashimon yakuza gang. After Maruo easily defeats the gang, Urara, impressed by his strength and by the fact that he is a simple human and not an ayashimon, recruits him as the first member of her yakuza group. Maruo, hesitant at first, accepts her offer, realizing that he can experience life as a manga protagonist following the path of a yakuza.

== Publication ==
Written and illustrated by Yuji Kaku, Ayashimon was serialized in Shueisha's shōnen manga magazine Weekly Shōnen Jump from November 15, 2021, to May 30, 2022. The first collected tankōbon volume was published on March 4, 2022.

The manga was simultaneously published in English by Viz Media and Shueisha's Manga Plus online platform.

=== Volumes ===
No.	Original release date	Original ISBN	English release date	English ISBN
1	March 4, 2022	978-4-08-882329-4	March 7, 2023	978-1-9747-3667-6
1. "I'll Play With You, Punk" (遊んでやるよ、どチンピラ, Asonde Yaru-yo, Dochinpira); 2. "This Monster Battle Stuff Is Intense!" (さすがバケモンバトル！, Sasuga Bakemon Batoru!); 3. "I Only Ever Take the Juiciest Bits" (食べたいトコしか食べない主義でね, Tabetai Toko Shika Tabenai Shugide ne); 4. "I'm So Scared I Can't Help But Run" (怖くて怖くて逃げちまう, Kowakute Kowakute Nigechimau); 5. "A Rare Breed of Human" (稀なる人間, Mare Naru Ningen); 6. "Do Not Say His Name" (俺の前でその名を呼ぶなよ, Ore no Mae de Sono Na o Yobu na Yo); 7. "You'll Make a Pretty Piece" (こりゃいい作品になりそうだ, Korya Ī Sakuhin ni Narisō da)
2	June 3, 2022	978-4-08-883141-1	June 6, 2023	978-1-9747-3858-8
8. "Don't Tell Me It's In Bad Taste" (趣味が悪いとか言わないでね, Shumi ga Warui Toka Iwanaide ne); 9. "Over My Dead Body" (ぶっ殺されても渡さねえ, Bukkoro Sarete mo Watasa nē); 10. "He Did Not" (違います, Chigaimasu); 11. "Aren't We Family?" (〝親子〞だろ, "Oyako" Daro); 12. "Big Wings" (でっけえ翼, Dekkē Tsubasa); 13. "I Refuse to Lose Again" (もう絶対に負けたくねえ, Mō Zettai ni Maketaku nē); 14. "What About You" (テメーはどうだ, Temē wa Dōda); 15. "Always Having a Blast" (どんな時でも楽しそうだ, Don'na Toki Demo Tanoshi-sōda); 16. "Only You" (アンタだけなんだ, Anta Dake Nanda)
3	August 4, 2022	978-4-08-883199-2	August 1, 2023	978-1-9747-3858-8
17. "Welcome" (ようこそ, Yōkoso); 18. "Who Are You" (誰なんだお前らは, Darena Nda Omaera); 19. "Until Your Chestnuts Are Out of the Fire, Buh-Bye" (拾えるまでグッバイ, Hiroeru Made Gubbai); 20. "Doesn't Begin to Describe It" (もはやぬるい, Mohaya Nurui); 21. "Sack" (おふぐり, O-Fuguri); 22. "Share the Same Fate" (一蓮托生だからね, Ichi ren Takushōdakara ne); 23. "Extinguisher" (消す者, Kesu Mono); 24. "I Can't Do It Alone" (一人じゃ無理だな, Hitori ja Murida na); 25. "The Urara Gang" (ウララ組, Urara Gumi)
