= Harumaki Gohan =

Japanese musician (born 1996)

Harumaki Gohan はるまきごはん
- Born: February 7, 1996 (age 30)
- Origin: Sapporo, Japan
- Genres: Alternative rock; J-pop; dream pop
- Instruments: piano
- Years active: 2014–present
- Label: Studio Gohan
- Website: harumakigohan.com

Harumaki Gohan (Japanese: はるまきごはん) is a Japanese Vocaloid music producer, illustrator, and animator. He debuted in February 2014 with the original song "WhiteNoise" and has since written songs, produced albums, and designed a video game.

== Artistry ==
=== Vocaloid music ===
Harumaki Gohan is known for producing both the Vocaloid music and the unique music videos (MVs) for his songs. They are, in combination, meant to evoke a worldview viewed by some as painful, emotional, or dreamy.

He initially handled all aspects of music and MV production by himself. However, since founding Studio Gohan in 2019, Harumaki Gohan has received help creating MVs for his songs.

In an interview with Real Sound, Harumaki Gohan expressed that illustrations, not music, come first in his creations.

=== Video games and anime ===
Harumaki Gohan helped design GenEi AP: Empty Heart, a video game based on the worldview and illustrations of his songs. The game released on April 9, 2022, and features a girl named Mikage who tries to find discs that her friend Spica wants to hear. By solving various puzzles on the map, Mikage can obtain discs and progress to the next stage. The game received Google Play's best of 2022 Indie Game award for Japan.

He composed the ending song "1%" for season 2 of the anime The Morose Mononokean as well as the opening theme song "Golden Ray" for the anime adaptation of video game Atelier Ryza: Ever Darkness & the Secret Hideout.

The mobile rhythm game Hatsune Miku: Colorful Stage! features three songs from Harumaki Gohan: "Melty Land Nightmare", a previous work, "Moonlight", a newly written song for the game composed along with fellow Vocaloid producer Tatsuya Kitani, and "Empurple", another newly written song.

== Discography ==
Title	Details	Peak chart position
BLUE ENDING NOVA	Released November 5, 2016	—
Sleep Sheep Sunroom	Released December 29, 2017	—
Neo Dream Traveler	Released December 26, 2018	25
Futari no	Released August 26, 2020	19
Envy Phantom	Released May 27, 2022	—
FAIRY TALE GALAXIES	Released October 29, 2024	—
