= Kamihitoe =

Single by Uru
- A-side: "Kokoroe"
- Released: April 15, 2023
- Recorded: 2023
- Length: 3:21
- Label: Sony
- Producer: Uru

Uru singles chronology
"Landmark" (2023)	"Kamihitoe" / "Kokoroe" (2023)	"Ambivalent" (2024)

Music video
- "Kamihitoe" on YouTube

Alternative cover
- Limited anime edition cover

"Kokoroe / Kamihitoe (A Fine Line)" is a single by Japanese singer Uru, released on April 15, 2023, as the ending theme to the anime television series Hell's Paradise: Jigokuraku (2023).

== Background ==
The song was originally released on April 15, 2023, later re-released on June 7, 2023, and peaked at number twelve on the Oricon single chart. The song was arranged as the ending theme to the anime television series Hell's Paradise: Jigokuraku (2023).

== Reception ==
The song was also ranked as the second Best Ending Theme Song in Spring 2023. Paul An'drey Pierre-Louis would comment on the song, writing "has a poignant message about resilience and perseverance, and Uru's beautiful vocals and moving lyrics really drive that message home." Meanwhile, for 2024, it was ranked number three in the Best Ending Theme Song category.

== Track listing ==
Compact disk (CD)

1. Kokoroe (心得)
2. Kamihitoe (紙一重)
3. Sore wo Ai to Yobu nara (それを愛と呼ぶなら) - From THE FIRST TAKE
4. Furiko (振り子) - From THE FIRST TAKE
5. Kokoroe -instrumental-
6. Kamihitoe -instrumental-

Limited Edition DVD

1. Soba ni Iru yo (そばにいるよ) MUSIC VIDEO
2. Koi (恋) MUSIC VIDEO
3. Datsu Karitekita Neko Syoukougun (脱・借りて来た猫症候群) MUSIC VIDEO

Anime Edition DVD

1. TVアニメ「地獄楽」Ending Movie＜Non Credit＞

== Charts ==
Chart performance for "Kamihitoe"
Chart	Peak position
Japan (Oricon)	12

== Personnel ==
- Uru – composition, lyrics
- Yo Tomi – arrangement (tracks 1–3)
- Munemoto Kouhei – arrangement (track 4)

== Accolades ==
Year	Award	Category	Result	Ref.
2024	10th Anime Trending Awards	Ending Theme Song of the Year	Nominated	

== Release history ==
Release dates and formats for Kamihitoe
Region	Date	Format(s)	Version	Label	Ref.
Various	June 7, 2023	Digital download; streaming; LP; CD	Original	Sony Japan	
