= Uru (singer) =

- Born: Japan
- Occupations: Singer; songwriter
- Years active: 2013–present
- Label: Sony Music Associated Records (2016–present)

Uru (ウル) is a Japanese singer-songwriter who is signed to SMAR. She keeps her personal information secret.

In 2020, she became one of five recipients of the Special Achievement Award at the 62nd Japan Record Awards.

== Discography ==
=== Album ===
Release date	Title	Peak position
Release date	Title	JPN
6 March 2019	Monochrome (モノクローム)	18
18 March 2020	Orion Blue (オリオンブルー)	5
1 February 2023	Contrast (コントラスト)	4
18 February 2026	Tone	5

=== Singles ===
Release date	Title	Peak position	Album
Release date	Title	JPN	Album
15 June 2016	"You in the Star" (星の中の君)	22	Monochrome
26 October 2016	"The Last Rain"	57	Monochrome
15 February 2017	"Freesia" (フリージア)	25	Monochrome
7 June 2017	"Poem of Happiness" (しあわせの詩)	47	Monochrome
8 November 2017	"Miracle" (奇蹟)	32	Monochrome
26 September 2018	"Remember"	26	Orion Blue
5 December 2018	"Prologue" (プロローグ)	11	Orion Blue
11 September 2019	"Wish" (願い)	19	Orion Blue
28 October 2020	"Break/Pendulum" (Break/振り子)	17	Contrast
10 February 2021	"First Love" (ファーストラヴ)	10	Contrast
25 August 2021	"Love Song"	19	Contrast
1 June 2022	"If You Call It Love" (それを愛と呼ぶなら)	12	Contrast
15 April 2023	"Kamihitoe" (紙一重)	12	tone
7 June 2023	"Kokoroe/Kamiichige" (心得/紙一重)		tone
14 February 2024	"Ambivalent" (アンビバレント)		tone
28 August 2025	"Never ends/Letter" (Never ends/手紙)		tone
26 November 2025	"Platform" (プラットフォーム)		tone

=== Promotional singles ===
Release date	Title
2020/2/9	"Anata ga iru koto de" (あなたがいることで)

== Awards ==
Year	Ceremony	Award	Nominated work	Result
2019	99th Television Drama Academy Awards	Theme Song Awards	Prologue	Won
