= Marisa Duran =

American voice actor

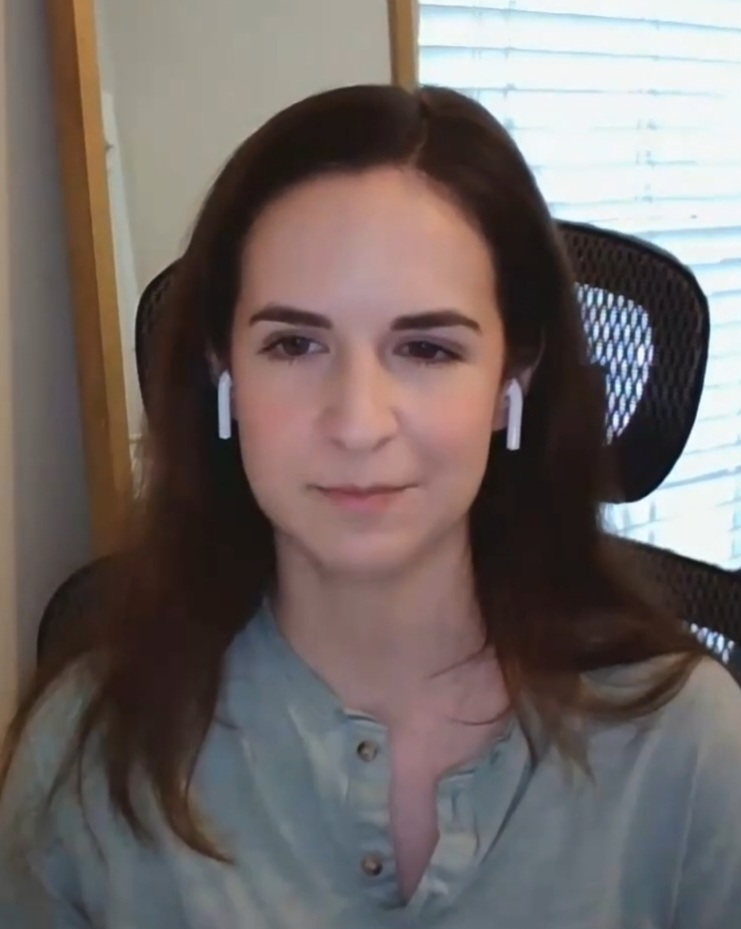
- Duran in 2024
- Education: Texas Christian University
- Occupation: Voice actor
- Years active: 2015–present
- Notable credits: Kyoko Hori in Horimiya; Sagiri in Hell's Paradise
- Website: www.marisa-duran.com

Marisa Duran is an American voice actor, known for their work on English dubs of anime.

== Career ==
Duran began their career in 2015 as background walla voices for anime dubs at Funimation. They cite the performances of Brittney Karbowski as Black Star in Soul Eater and Grey DeLisle as Azula in Avatar: The Last Airbender as inspiring their pursuit of voice acting. Karbowski's portrayal of a male character as a female voice actor, and DeLisle's deeper voice with a female role, helped Duran feel there's a place for them in acting.

During the COVID-19 pandemic, Duran invested in home recording equipment and began more aggressively pursuing auditions. This resulted in their first lead role, Hori in Horimiya in 2021. Voice director Caitlin Glass, who cast Duran as Hori, described them as "one of the more talented new voice actors I've come across in recent years."

Duran was nominated for the 2024 Crunchyroll Anime Award for Best Voice Artist Performance (English) (as Sagiri in Hell's Paradise).

== Personal life ==
Duran attended Texas Christian University. They are on the asexuality spectrum, non-binary, and use she/they pronouns.

== Filmography ==
=== Animated series ===
List of voice performances in animated series
Year	Title	Role	Notes	Ref.
2021	Horimiya	Kyoko Hori		
2021	Shadows House	Lou / Louise		
2021	Kageki Shojo!!	Chika and Chiaki's Mother		
2021	The World Ends with You: The Animation	Mitsuki Konishi		
2021	Love Live! Nijigasaki High School Idol Club	Kyoko		
2021	Banished from the Hero's Party	Megria		
2021	Restaurant to Another World	Julietta	Season 2	
2022	Aoashi	Hana Ichijo		
2022	Skeleton Knight in Another World	Rita		
2022	Classroom of the Elite	Saki Yamashita	Season 2	
2022	Remake Our Life!	Eiko Kawasegawa		
2022	Overlord IV	11th Seat of the Black Scripture		
2022	More Than a Married Couple, But Not Lovers	Manami		
2023	Tomo-chan Is a Girl!	Naoko Mifune		
2023	The Iceblade Sorcerer Shall Rule the World	Dina Sera		
2023	Vinland Saga	Lotta	Season 2, Crunchyroll dub.	
2023	Hell's Paradise	Sagiri	Also season 2	
2023	My Clueless First Friend	Yukiko Takada		
2023	Horimiya: The Missing Pieces	Kyoko Hori		
2023	Reborn as a Vending Machine, I Now Wander the Dungeon	Munami		
2023	Sugar Apple Fairy Tale	Bridget		
2023	I'm in Love with the Villainess	Misha		
2023	The Ancient Magus' Bride	Jasmine	Season 2 part 2	
2023	Frieren	Laufen		
2023	Shangri-La Frontier	Nu2meg / Megumi Natsume		
2023	Shy	Stigma		
2023	The 100 Girlfriends Who Really, Really, Really, Really, Really Love You	Velocci Rapko		
2024	Natsume's Book of Friends	Sasada	Seasons 4-6	
2024	Chillin' in Another World with Level 2 Super Cheat Powers	Byleri		
2024	Tying the Knot with an Amagami Sister	Makoto Takeda		
2025	The Ossan Newbie Adventurer	Angelica		
2025	I Left My A-Rank Party to Help My Former Students Reach the Dungeon Depths!	Silk Amberwood		
2025	Solo Leveling	Hanekawa	Season 2	
2025	Zenshu	Meg		
2025	With You, Our Love Will Make It Through	Ritsuka Kawashima		
2026	Agents of the Four Seasons: Dance of Spring	Sakura		
2026	The Daily Life of a Middle-Aged Online Shopper in Another World	Alstroemeria		
