= Phil Parsons (voice actor) =

American voice actor

- Occupation: Voice actor
- Years active: 1990–present

Phil Parsons is an American voice actor. He is known for voicing Nappa in the Funimation dub of the Dragon Ball series, Kenny Ackerman in Attack on Titan, Renji Yomo in Tokyo Ghoul, Leonard Burns in Fire Force, and Buccaneer in Fullmetal Alchemist: Brotherhood.

== Dubbing roles ==
=== Anime ===
- A Certain Magical Index III – Chimitsu Sunazara, Bellagi (ep18)
- Attack on Titan – Kenny Ackerman
- Baccano! – Berga Gandor
- Baki the Grappler – Kajima
- Black Clover - Roland
- Blood Blockade Battlefront – Klaus V. Reinherz
- Burst Angel – Tetsuzo
- Case Closed (FUNimation dub) – Cramden Yodlemiere, Xaltar, Kevin
- Chaos;Child – Wataru Sakuma
- Chrome Shelled Regios – Zidd
- Castle Town Dandelion - Souichirou Sakurada
- Darker than Black – Ukiyama
- Date A Live III - Roger Murdoch
- Dimension W – Douglas Marks (Eps. 7, 9–10, 12)
- Dragon Ball - Mutaito
- Dragon Ball Z – Nappa, Grand Supreme Kai
- Dragon Ball Z Kai - Nappa, Grand Supreme Kai
- Dragon Ball Super - Nappa, Sun, Bubibinman
- Dragon Ball Super: Broly - Nappa, Male Saiyan Staff A, Male Saiyan Courtier A
- Endride – King Delzaine
- Eureka Seven: AO – Mitsuo Arata (Naru's Father)
- Fairy Tail – Older Vanish Brother, (Eps. 3–4, 129) Belserion (Eps. 312)
- Fairy Tail: 100 Years Quest – Gajeel Redfox (Eps. 16+)
- Fire Force – Leonard Burns
- Fullmetal Alchemist series – Gen. Hakuro, Buccaneer
- Ga-Rei: Zero – Koji Iwahata
- Gunslinger Girl: Il Teatrino – Leonardo Conti
- High School DxD – Azazel (Seasons 2–4)
- Kiddy Grade – Noble Bishop
- Last Exile: Fam, the Silver Wing – Roland (Ep. 7, 9.5), Yashbal Anad (Ep. 6)
- Lupin the 3rd: The Pursuit of Harimao's Treasure – Sir Archer
- MF Ghost – Ren's Dad
- Nina the Starry Bride – Vogue
- Noragami: Aragoto – Kugaha
- One Piece – Zaba, Phillip, Jesus Burgess, Capote, Jabra
- Overlord – Nigun Grid Luin
- Phantom ~Requiem for the Phantom – Daisuke
- Rebuild of Evangelion – Shigeru Aoba
- Rent-A-Girlfriend – Mami's dad
- Rumbling Hearts – Mr. Suzumiya
- Senran Kagura – Dogen
- Shakugan no Shana – Ribesal (Season 3)
- Shangri-La – Nemoto
- Shiki – Yoshikazu Tanaka (1st voice), Hirosawa
- SoltyRei – John Kimberly (Ep. 8)
- Soul Eater – Flying Dutchman
- Speed Grapher – Fukushima
- To Be Hero X – Leo
- Tokyo Ghoul series – Renji Yomo
- Toriko – Bourbo
- Trinity Blood – Leon Garcia De Asturias
- Vexille – Saga
- Wistoria: Wand and Sword – Edward
- Yakuza Fiancé: Raise wa Tanin ga Ii – Gaku Miyama

== Filmography ==
=== Video games ===
- Borderlands: The Pre-Sequel! – Lost Legion Infantry #1
- Battleborn – Caldarius
- Dragon Ball Z: Budokai - Nappa
- Dragon Ball Z: Budokai 2 - Nappa
- Dragon Ball Z: Budokai 3 - Nappa
- Dragon Ball Z: Sagas - Nappa
- Dragon Ball Z: Budokai Tenkaichi - Nappa
- Dragon Ball Z: Budokai Tenkaichi 2 - Nappa
- Dragon Ball Z: Budokai Tenkaichi 3 - Nappa
- Dragon Ball Z: Burst Limit - Nappa
- Dragon Ball Z: Infinite World - Nappa
- Dragon Ball: Raging Blast - Nappa
- Dragon Ball Z: Tenkaichi Tag Team - Nappa
- Dragon Ball: Raging Blast 2 - Nappa
- Dragon Ball Z: Ultimate Tenkaichi - Nappa
- Dragon Ball Z: For Kinect - Nappa
- Dragon Ball Z: Battle of Z - Nappa
- Dragon Ball Xenoverse - Nappa
- Dragon Ball Xenoverse 2 - Nappa
- Dragon Ball FighterZ - Nappa
- Dragon Ball Legends - Nappa
- Dragon Ball Z: Kakarot - Nappa
- Smite – Apollo, Chiron
