= Gabimaru =

Fictional character from Hell's Paradise: Jigokuraku

- Hell's Paradise: Jigokuraku character
- Illustration of Gabimaru by Yuji Kaku
- First appearance: "Hell's Paradise: Jigokuraku Chapter 1"; January 22, 2018
- Created by: Yuji Kaku
- Portrayed by: Tsubasa Kizu
- Voiced by: Japanese; Chiaki Kobayashi; English; Alejandro Saab

In-universe information
- Full name: Saku (朔)
- Aliases: Gabimaru the Hollow; がらんの画眉丸
- Nickname: Gabi
- Gender: Male
- Occupation: Shinobi
- Nationality: Japanese

Saku (朔), often referred to as Gabimaru (Japanese: 画眉丸), is the main protagonist of the manga series Hell's Paradise: Jigokuraku, written and illustrated by Yuji Kaku. He is introduced as a shinobi raised in the village of Iwagakure and is later set up for execution by the village chief when he plans to leave his past as an assassin behind and live a peaceful life with his wife. The shogunate later recruits death row convicts to compete in acquiring the elixir of life from the Shinsenkyō island in exchange for a pardon for their past crimes. In addition to the anime series, Gabimaru appears as a playable character in multiple games outside of the Hell's Paradise: Jigokuraku series.

Kaku created Gabimaru with the mindset that he needed a strong and immediate motivation for his main character to fight to survive. In the Hell's Paradise anime adaptation, he is voiced by Chiaki Kobayashi in Japanese and Alejandro Saab in English. The character received generally positive acclaim from critics for his role in Hell's Paradise, for his character growth and his role as an anti-hero in his backstory.

== Creation and conception ==
Manga creator Yuji Kaku intended for the protagonist of his Hell's Paradise series to have a distinct driving force, expressing that a powerful immortal ninja was a cool concept. He conceptualized Gabimaru as a married character, which he saw as "unique" in shonen manga. In an interview with an Anime News Network writer, Kaku noted that "the main character really needs a strong motivation to survive. ... So I made his wife the driving force". Gabimaru's role in the story was meant to highlight aspects of his personality and growth. While writing, Kaku realized themes shifted more towards the Middle Way doctrine, with the paradoxes and conflict. Kaku stated he wanted to gradually develop Gabimaru's character—from a "hollow" and "bloodthirsty" assassin to a more "empathetic" person. He is often referred to by the mononym "Gabimaru", the short form of the title he inherited as the strongest shinobi of Iwagakure. In an interview with Crunchyroll, Kaku stated, "Despite condemned criminals and executioners being difficult characters to empathize with, if they share our perspective, then we feel close to them, and they stand out as unique characters in the Edo period, when people had totally different ideas about ethics and human rights." He also found it intriguing to portray a character that's not supposed to die is found in a near-death situation. In his explanation of how he approached character designs, Kaku expressed that "Designing characters isn't unpleasant, and I try to express the character's personality through their design. Reality is different, but in manga, I think there's a firm connection between the inside and outside. ... I deliberately try give important characters strong designs."

=== Casting ===
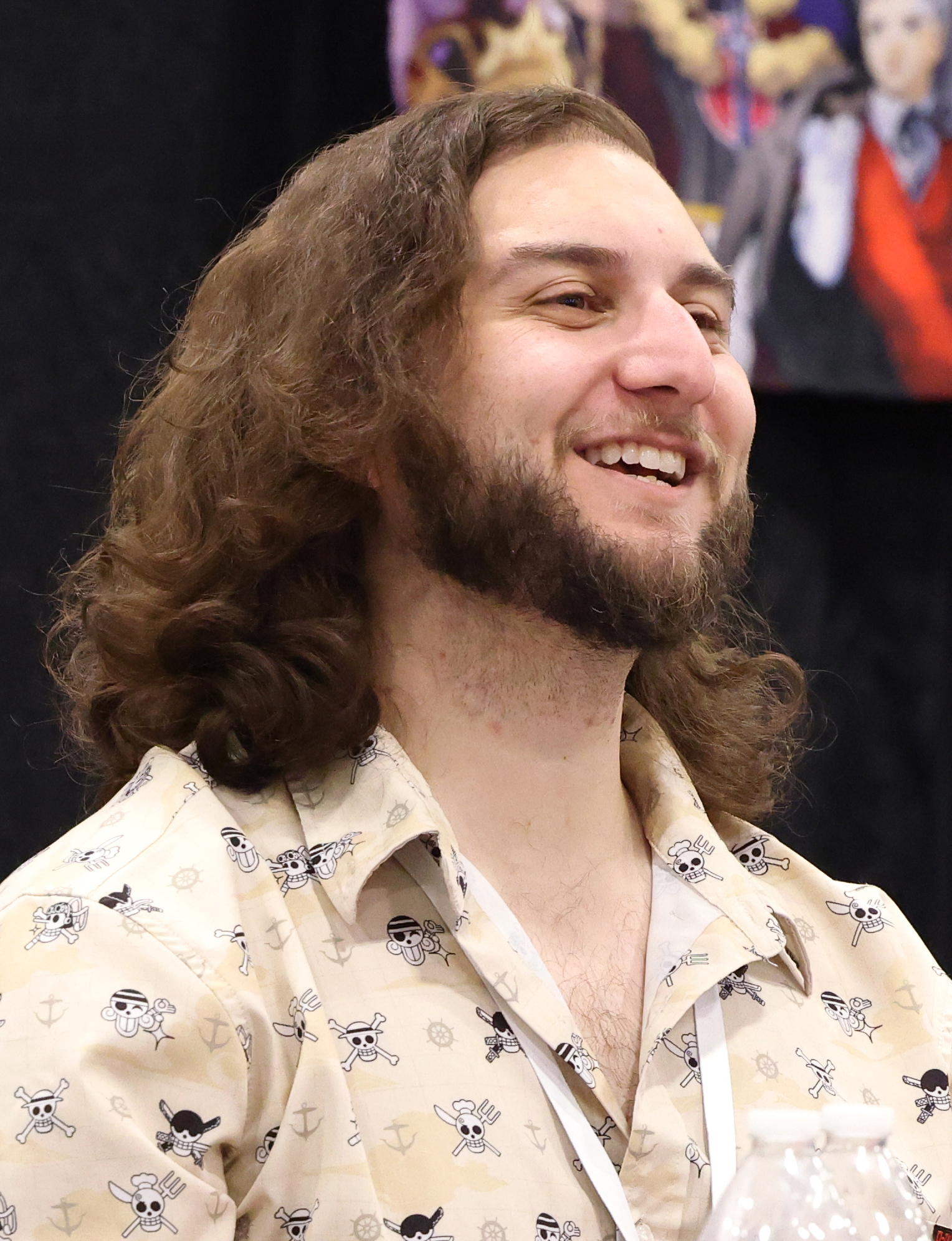
Alejandro Saab voices Gabimaru in the English dub of the anime adaptation.

In the Hell's Paradise anime adaptation, Gabimaru is voiced by Chiaki Kobayashi in Japanese, chosen by director Kaori Makita for his "calm" and "appealing" voice. In English, he is voiced by American voice actor Alejandro Saab. Makita mentioned that the casting of the voice actors for Gabimaru and Sagiri were the most difficult part, "When reading the manga, every reader imagines a different voice for the characters. The character's personality and age are the clues [I] use when deciding who to cast. Sometimes the actual age of the character is really different from their personality and their physicality, but all of that is taken into consideration when casting."

In an interview with Den of Geek's writer Daniel Kurland, Saab stated "When it comes to Gabimaru, the fact that the whole reason that he's in any of this right now is to get back to his wife is something that [I] love. I mean, how can you not love a murderer with a heart of gold, right? He's not just someone who wants to be strong. He's someone who just wants to go home, which is something that I think everyone can relate to. ... He's always been told that he's hollow and that's all that he'll ever be. Expressing that emotion, rage, fears, and happiness is just everything. I adore it."

== Appearances ==
=== In Hell's Paradise ===
An only child of a jonin couple in the Edo period, he was originally given the name Saku by his mother, who believed the symbolism behind his name was "befitting" for a shinobi. He first appears in the manga as an abandoned orphan raised by the village chief of Iwagakure as an inheritor to the village's title for the strongest, "Gabimaru the Hollow". When he wished to cut ties with the village and live a normal life with his wife, the chief arranged for him to be captured and sentenced to death. As Yamada Asaemon Sagiri prepares to decapitate Gabimaru, he instinctively dodges at the last second and counterattacks. Sagiri invites him to participate in an expedition of the elixir of life's retrieval from the land of Shinsenkyō to receive a pardon for his crimes and return to his wife, the village chief's daughter. Gabimaru's ability, Ninpō: Hibōshi (忍法 火法師, Ninpō: Hi hōshi), allows him to set himself on fire by raising his body temperature to ignite the oil in his skin. His body undergoes significant changes due to the "Flower Tao", featuring sprouting flowers and dark markings across his left eye from overuse of his power, which he ultimately manages to stabilize. Throughout Gabimaru's journey, his demeanor gradually develops from cold and emotionless to empathetic and humane.

=== In other media ===
The first stage play adaptation for Hell's Paradise: Jigokuraku was announced following the release of a visual on November 28, 2022. Tsubasa Kizu portrayed Gabimaru.

In the survival role-playing video game (RPG) Jigokuraku: Paradise Battle, Gabimaru appears as a playable character.

== Reception ==
=== Popularity ===
Gabimaru was well-received by the series' readers and critics. He was nominated for Boy of the Year at the 10th Anime Trending Awards. While Yoan Sover's performance as Gabimaru was one of the nominees for Best Voice Artist Performance (French) at the 8th Crunchyroll Anime Awards.

=== Critical response ===
Critical response to Gabimaru's role was generally favorable. Polygon's writer Isaac Rouse said Gabimaru was "hardened by years of brutal training, Gabimaru survives every form of execution attempted, from beheading to burning at the stake." While Kayla Chu of InBetweenDrafts in her review of the first episode of Hell's Paradise said he was "the standout", also saying that "His merciless nature when killing others in these moments prove that killing is second nature to him and that part of him is certainly hollow when killing." While Daniel Kurland from Den of Geek wrote that Hell's Paradise began at a point where Gabimaru was already past the point of exhaustion, saying "It's an ambitious foundation for the show's main character, but after only one episode there's already a distinct quality to Gabimaru that inspires the viewer to want to see what happens to him rather than jump over to the next ultra-violent assassin series."

=== Awards and nominations ===
Year	Award	Category	Recipient	Result	Ref.
2024	8th Crunchyroll Anime Awards	Best Voice Artist Performance (French)	Yoan Sover as Gabimaru	Nominated	
2024	10th Anime Trending Awards	Boy of the Year	Gabimaru	Nominated	
