= Sagiri (character) =

Fictional character from Hell's Paradise: Jigokuraku

- Hell's Paradise: Jigokuraku character
- Illustration of Sagiri by Yuji Kaku
- First appearance: "Hell's Paradise: Jigokuraku Chapter 1"; January 22, 2018
- Last appearance: "Hell's Paradise: Jigokuraku Chapter 127"; January 25, 2021
- Created by: Yuji Kaku
- Portrayed by: Ayana Shiramoto
- Voiced by: Japanese; Yumiri Hanamori; English; Marisa Duran

In-universe information
- Full name: Yamada Asaemon Sagiri
- Nickname: Sagi
- Gender: Female
- Nationality: Japanese

Yamada Asaemon Sagiri (Japanese: 山田浅ェ門 佐切), often known as simply Sagiri (佐切), is a fictional character of Yuji Kaku's manga series Hell's Paradise: Jigokuraku. After the shogun calls for death row convicts to acquire the Elixir of Life from an island believed to be Shinsenkyo in exchange for a pardon of their past crimes, executioner Sagiri recruits Gabimaru to be a part of the expedition team and is put in charge of acting as his monitor until the mission is complete.

== Creation and concept ==
When creating Hell's Paradise: Jigokuraku, Yuji Kaku intended to give Sagiri the same values as people living in the 2020s, in order for her to stand out in the Edo period setting. He created details and backstories for every character in the manga, regardless of whether or not they were actually included in the story, explaining, "Character development is really fun for me. It's something that I genuinely enjoy." While writing, Kaku realized the themes shifted more towards the Middle Way, with the paradoxes and conflict. He felt that it should be Sagiri who deals with those, noting "so for me, Sagiri became the protagonist of the latter half".

In an interview with Manga Plus, Kaku's editor Hideaki Sakakibara, revealed an early concept art of Sagiri. The version was "similar" to her final design but had a dark collar, no mourning bell, a slightly different designed hakama, and two swords. When performing her job as an executioner, Sagiri generally displays a stoic and serious demeanor, as she possesses a "strong" sense of duty when approaching tasks. Koji Hisaki adapted Sagiri's design for the Hell's Paradise anime adaptation.

=== Casting ===
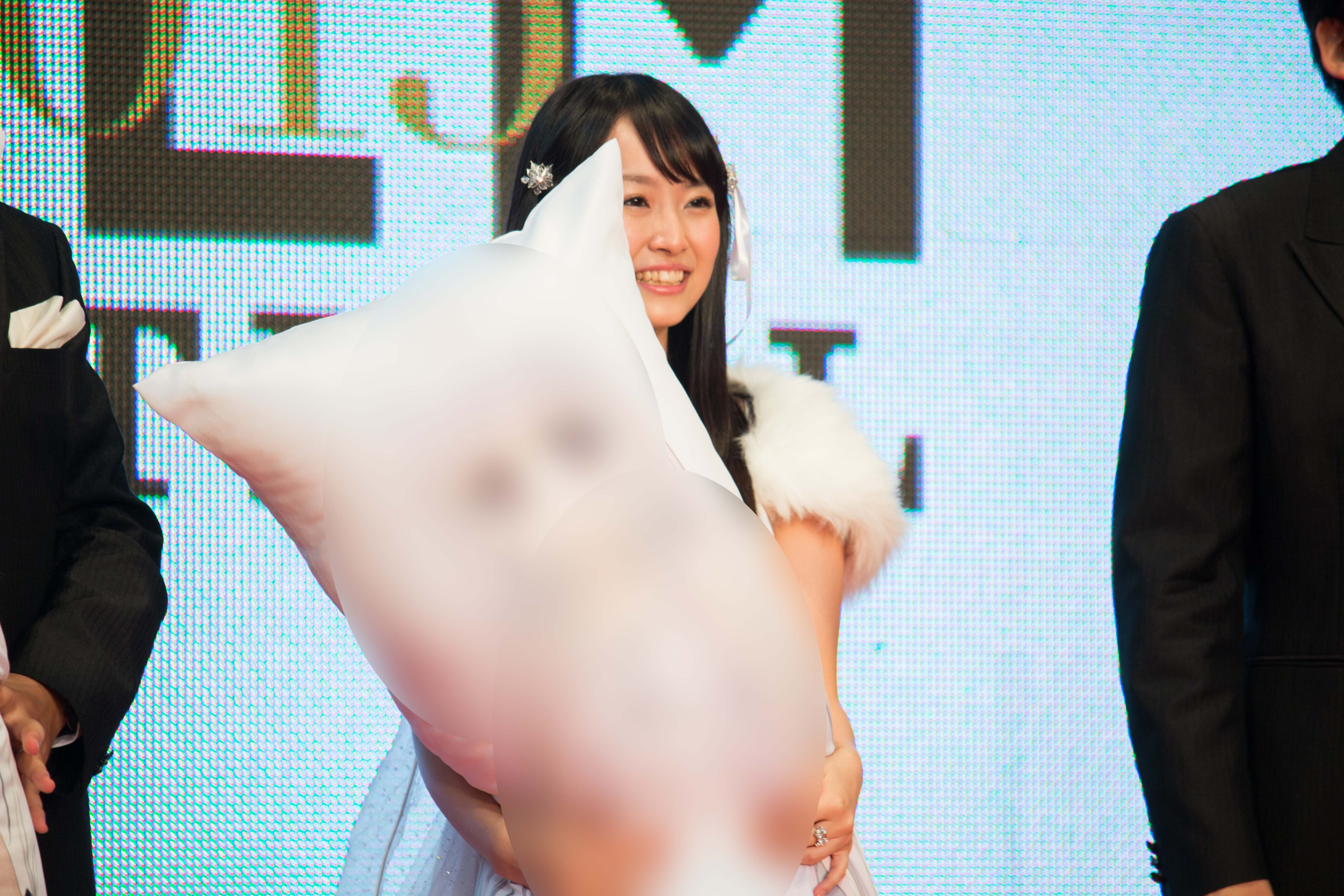
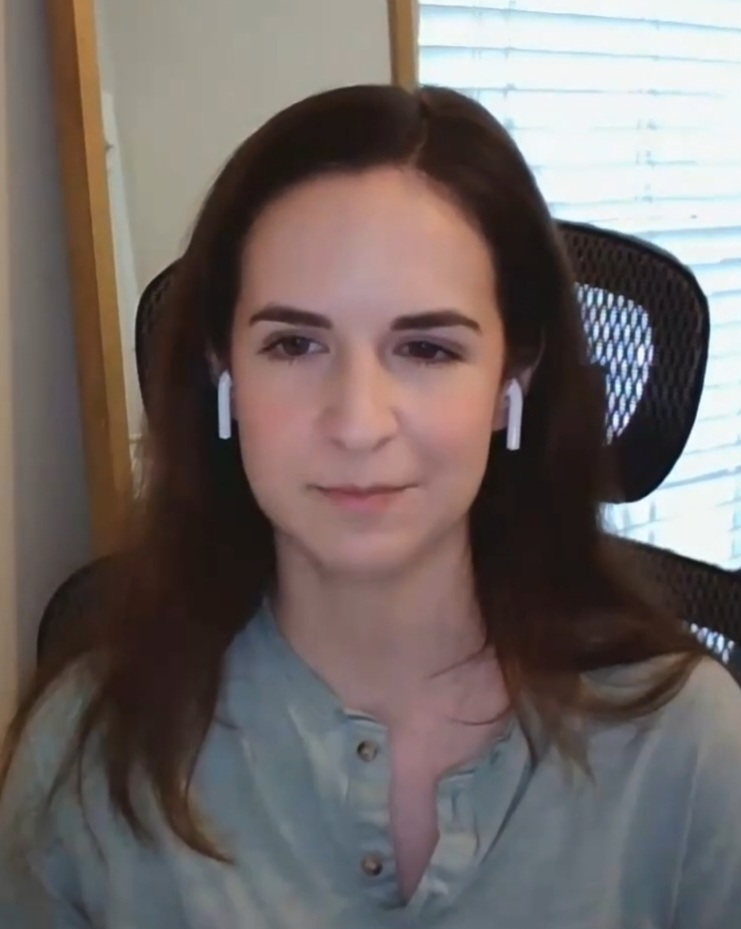
Yumiri Hanamori (left) and Marisa Duran (right) voiced Sagiri in the original Japanese version and English dub, respectively.

Kaori Makita, director for Hell's Paradise noted casting voice actors for Gabimaru and Sagiri was the most difficult part, mentioning "When reading the manga, every reader imagines a different voice for the characters. The character's personality and age are the clues I use when deciding who to cast. Sometimes the actual age of the character is really different from their personality and their physicality, but all of that is taken into consideration when casting." Yamada Asaemon Sagiri is voiced by Yumiri Hanamori in Japanese. Makita also wrote "Sagiri is someone who is a little bit shaken or unsure of herself on the inside, and Hanamori-san was able to convey that in her performance. She was able to show [through her audition performance] that Sagiri was someone who is lost but still confident with a strong core. When I saw that in her, that's when I decided Hanamori-san was the person I had to choose for Sagiri."

Marisa Duran voices her in English. In an interview with Crunchyroll, Duran said "There is so much of Sagiri that I relate to. It's been really cool to imbue this character with aspects of my own life and my own experiences. There are gender stereotypes and gender norms and she's subverting those expectations. And I think it's really neat that the story comes back down to love, whether it's love of one's partner, one's village, one's community or one's profession. I think in Sagiri's case, it's love of oneself, figuring out who you are, what your purpose is outside of what society is telling you."

== Appearances ==
=== In Hell's Paradise ===
Sagiri is the 12th rank Asaemon of the Yamada clan, as well as the daughter to the former's leader, Yamada Asaemon Kichiji. After realizing at a young age that it was unavoidable for a clan member to not associate themselves with death, she made the decision to become a part of the clan's trade as an executioner. After the recent discovery of the legendary island known as Shinsenkyō, Sagiri and the other ranked Yamada Asaemons become tasked by the shogun to recruit death row convicts for the latest expedition team to retrieve the Elixir of Life from the island, with the reward for the criminals being an official pardon for their crimes. She is assigned the infamous Iwagakure shinobi known as Gabimaru the Hollow and heads to his prison.

== Reception ==
=== Popularity ===
Yamada Asaemon Sagiri was well received by the series' readers and critics. Yumiri Hanamori's performance as Sagiri was nominated for Best Voice Acting Performance – Female at the 10th Anime Trending Awards. Marisa Duran's performance of the character was one of the nominees for Best Voice Artist Performance (English) at the 8th Crunchyroll Anime Awards.

=== Awards and nominations ===
Year	Award	Category	Recipient	Result	Ref.
2024	8th Crunchyroll Anime Awards	Best Voice Artist Performance (English)	Marisa Duran as Yamada Asaemon Sagiri	Nominated	
2024	10th Anime Trending Awards	Best Voice Acting Performance – Female	Yumiri Hanamori as Yamada Asaemon Sagiri	Nominated	
