= Hell's Paradise: Jigokuraku =

Japanese manga series

- First tankōbon volume cover, featuring Gabimaru

地獄楽 (Jigokuraku)
- Genre: Action; Dark fantasy; Psychological thriller
- Manga
- Written by: Yuji Kaku
- Published by: Shueisha
- English publisher: NA: Viz Media
- Imprint: Jump Comics+
- Magazine: Shōnen Jump+
- Original run: January 22, 2018 – January 25, 2021
- Volumes: 13
- Anime television series
- Hell's Paradise (2023–present)
- Video games
- Jigokuraku: Paradise Battle (2025)
- icon

Hell's Paradise: Jigokuraku (Note: Japanese: 地獄楽, Hepburn: Jigokuraku) is a Japanese web manga series written and illustrated by Yuji Kaku. Set in the Edo period of Japan, the series follows the journey of ninja Gabimaru and executioner Yamada Asaemon Sagiri as they search for the elixir of immortality. Kaku wrote the series with the mindset of creating a setting including multiple pairs of people with unaligned interests thrown into an enclosed space and forced to work together. It was serialized on Shueisha's manga platform Shōnen Jump+ from January 2018 to January 2021. The series consists of 127 chapters collected in 13 tankōbon volumes. Shueisha simultaneously published the manga in English on its Manga Plus online platform, while Viz Media licensed it for digital and print release in North America.

A 13-episode anime television series adaptation, titled Hell's Paradise, produced by MAPPA and directed by Kaori Makita, was broadcast on TV Tokyo and its affiliates from April to July 2023. A second season aired from January to March 2026.

By August 2018, Hell's Paradise: Jigokuraku had become the most popular series on Shōnen Jump+. The series has been well received by critics, who have praised its action and characters. By December 2022, the manga had over 4 million copies in circulation.

== Synopsis ==
=== Setting ===
Hell's Paradise: Jigokuraku is set in Japan's Edo period. The shogunate sought the elixir of immortality, which was reportedly found on the island of Shinsenkyo. His agents gather a group of 10 death row criminals who will each be supervised by a Yamada Asaemon executioner, authorised to kill them if they attempt to escape. The story follows Gabimaru the Hollow, a ninja from Iwagakure, his assigned monitor, Yamada Asaemon Sagiri, and the others as they arrive on the island where they encounter all manner of strange and deadly characters, beasts and plants. These were all created by the hermit Shufu (Jofuku), who sought the secrets of immortality based on the Shinsen thought. Through his experiments, the hermit produced Lord Tensen and a group of almost immortal androgynous Tensen by combining human and flower Tao (Taoist energy) through an internal process called naitanho. He aimed to produce the elixir (Tan) by the external process known as gaitanho. Also inhabiting the island are several sentient Doshi, monster-like beings serve as students, servants, and military force to Lord Tensen, the almost mindless Shoshin created through the combination of humans and animals to eliminate human interlopers. The human-like Hoko were created to be the observers and producers of food. Plants on the island are predatory and may pose a threat to any interloper.

=== Premise ===
The series initially focuses on the execution of Gabimaru, which ultimately fails as nothing was able to kill him due to his superhuman-like body. He believes that his love for his wife is subconsciously keeping him alive, executioner Yamada Asaemon Sagiri offers him the chance to be pardoned of all crimes by the Shogunate if he finds the elixir of life on Kotaku (こたく), more commonly known as Shinsenkyo (神仙郷, Shinsenkyō), a legendary realm discovered southwest of the Ryukyu Kingdom. After losing five expedition teams sent to the island, the Shogunate sends a group of death row convicts, known as the Vanguard Party. The convicts are each given a Yamada Asaemon executioner, who they must return with in order to obtain the pardon.

== Production ==
=== Concept and creation ===
Yuji Kaku originated Hell's Paradise: Jigokuraku from a framework that had "several pairs of people whose interests aren't aligned [being] thrown into an enclosed space and forced to work together." The story was initially about children sent to a youth detention center with lawyers fighting for them. However, through discussions with his editor, they dropped the setting and added different characters to the same framework, which was kept because Kaku has always liked the way human relationships change and wanted to write a story about that. He felt a setting based in Shinsenkyo would work with any type of story and would be easy to write, explaining that it would be more interesting if a character "who isn't supposed to die" finds themselves in a near-death situation.

The storyboards for the first three chapters of the manga were brought to the Shōnen Jump+ editorial staff in 2017. A big fan of Kaku's art since Fantasma in Jump Square, Hideaki Sakakibara enthusiastically volunteered to take on the series and became its second editor with chapters two and three. He believed that Hell's Paradise was the "mainstream battle fantasy" series that Shōnen Jump+ was lacking and could become a print best-seller. Sakakibara was initially concerned with the "multi-protagonist story" of the prisoners, executioners, and the island's creatures. Although he thought having the Battle Royale-style story in a manga would be interesting, he worried it would cause a badly paced story where they would have to split up the pages between characters and be unable to show the main characters' actions as much. However, he credits Kaku's genius at quickly and simply introducing characters and his drawing talent for making it all work.

=== Development ===
Kaku and Sakakibara planned out what happened in the story in sets of 10 chapters, or a whole volume. At first, Kaku wrote the story with Gabimaru as the protagonist and with a focus on his growth. But while writing, he realized the themes had shifted towards the Middle Way, with the paradoxes and conflict, he felt that Sagiri should deal with those, "so for me, Sagiri became the protagonist of the latter half". Sakakibara gave Kaku free rein as far as illustrations were concerned. He said that from the first chapter the series has had "extreme" illustrations, which resulted in popularity among readers, but made it hard for new readers to get into. Sakakibara said it was easy to communicate things to him as he was quick to figure out what he meant, with Kaku having been a former manga editor himself. However, Kaku admitted this caused him to unconsciously hold back creatively by thinking objectively like an editor. As his first serial on a digital platform, Kaku said he was conscious of how speech bubbles and text needed to be larger for smartphones and drew double-page spreads so that looking at one page at a time did not feel strange.

Kaku created details and backstories for every character in Hell's Paradise: Jigokuraku, regardless of whether or not they were actually included in the series. He intended for Gabimaru, with his extreme attachment to love, and Sagiri, with her concerns about being a woman, to have the same values as someone living in the 2020s, saying, "Despite condemned criminals and executioners being difficult characters to empathize with, if they share our perspective, then we feel close to them, and they stand out as unique characters" in the Edo period, when people had totally different ideas about ethics and human rights. When Kaku first described the character Shion to Sakakibara, the editor imagined him like Kazuo Kiriyama from Battle Royale. But after talking it over, Shion became the kind teacher he is in the manga, while the crazy personality was given to Shugen instead. Yukinobu Tatsu, the author of Dandadan, was one of Kaku's assistants on the manga.

== Media ==
=== Manga ===
Written and illustrated by Yuji Kaku, Hell's Paradise: Jigokuraku began weekly serialization on the Shōnen Jump+ application and website on January 22, 2018. The series ended with the 127th chapter on January 25, 2021. The chapters were collected and published in 13 tankōbon volumes by Shueisha between April 4, 2018, and April 30, 2021. Shueisha simultaneously published the series in English for free on the Manga Plus app and website. Special chapters were published in Weekly Shōnen Jump on August 6, 2018, and June 10, 2019. A special one-shot, titled "Forest of Misfortune" (勿怪の森, Mokke no Mori), was published on Shōnen Jump+ on April 8, 2023.

Jigokuraku: Saikyō no Nukenin Gaman no Gabimaru (じごくらく 〜最強の抜け忍 がまんの画眉丸〜), a comedic spin-off manga created by Ōhashi, began serialization on Shōnen Jump+ on January 20, 2020. It ended with the 21st chapter on June 29, 2020. The chapters were collected and published into a single tankōbon volume on September 4, 2020.

Viz Media began publishing the manga in English digitally on its website on May 17, 2018. The 13 volumes were published in print from March 17, 2020, to March 15, 2022. They also released a box set containing all 13 volumes plus an additional book that contains the "Forest of Misfortune" story on October 28, 2025. The series has been published digitally in vertical scrolling format on the Webtoon online platform since October 21, 2024.

==== Volumes ====
No.	Original release date	Original ISBN	English release date	English ISBN
1	April 4, 2018	978-4-08-881471-1	March 17, 2020	978-1-9747-1320-2
Chapters 1–6
Gabimaru is sentenced to be executed due to his crimes after being betrayed by his companion. There have been many attempts to kill Gabimaru to no effect. Gabimaru recalls he was a shinobi who was married to the chief's daughter. A swordswoman executor name Sagiri is hired to execute him. At the last moment, Gabimaru realizes he does not want to die, and Sagiri deduces that he still loves his wife. Sagiri tells Gabimaru that the shogun have written a pardon for him that will absolve him of any crime and gain protection as long as he and Sagiri travel with others to an island to find the elixir of immortality. While waiting instructions, all the criminals will be assigned escorts, and if the prisoners rebel then they will be executed. Gabimaru meets Aza Chobei, Tamiya Gantetsusai, Yuzuriha, Nurugai, Akagino, Moro Masaya, Hourubou, Keiun the Quarreler and Rokurota after dispelling most of the criminals as they head off to the island.
2	June 4, 2018	978-4-08-881502-2	May 19, 2020	978-1-9747-1321-9
Chapters 7–16
3	August 3, 2018	978-4-08-881546-6	July 21, 2020	978-1-9747-1322-6
Chapters 17–26
4	November 2, 2018	978-4-08-881601-2	September 15, 2020	978-1-9747-1323-3
Chapters 27–36
5	March 4, 2019	978-4-08-881697-5	November 17, 2020	978-1-9747-1324-0
Chapters 37–46
6	June 4, 2019	978-4-08-881803-0	January 19, 2021	978-1-9747-1325-7
Chapters 47–56
7	September 4, 2019	978-4-08-882056-9	March 16, 2021	978-1-9747-1877-1
Chapters 57–66
8	December 4, 2019	978-4-08-882148-1	May 18, 2021	978-1-9747-1878-8
Chapters 67–76
9	March 4, 2020	978-4-08-882230-3	July 20, 2021	978-1-97-471530-5
Chapters 77–86
10	June 4, 2020	978-4-08-882338-6	September 21, 2021	978-1-9747-2099-6
Chapters 87–96
11	September 4, 2020	978-4-08-882407-9	November 16, 2021	978-1-9747-2282-2
Chapters 97–106
12	December 4, 2020	978-4-08-882523-6	January 18, 2022	978-1-9747-2464-2
Chapters 107–116
13	April 30, 2021	978-4-08-882583-0	March 15, 2022	978-1-9747-2851-0
Chapters 117–127

=== Anime ===
An anime television series adaptation, produced by MAPPA and directed by Kaori Makita, and aired from April 1 to July 1, 2023, on TV Tokyo and other networks.

Crunchyroll streamed the series worldwide outside of Asia, while Netflix has streamed the series in Asia Pacific (excluding Mainland China, Australia, New Zealand).

A second season, adapting the manga's "Lord Tensen" and "Hōrai" story arcs, was announced after the airing of the thirteenth episode. It aired from January 11 to March 29, 2026, with the cast and staff from the first season reprising their roles.

=== Video games ===
Jigokuraku: Paradise Battle, a free-to-play role-playing survival video game for smartphones and personal computers, was released in November 2025. Produced by Good Smile Company, staff from the anime helped with the game, including Akira Kindaichi supervising the scenario and Yoshiaki Dewa composing the music. Gabimaru is also a playable character in the July 2022 Nintendo Switch video game Captain Velvet Meteor: The Jump+ Dimensions.

=== Other media ===
A novel adaptation, Jigokuraku: Utakata no Yume (地獄楽 うたかたの夢), was written by Sakaku Hishikawa and published on September 4, 2019. A second novel, Jigokuraku: Namima no Tsuioku (地獄楽 波間の追憶), followed on April 4, 2023. Shueisha published Jigokuraku: Kaitai Shinsho (地獄楽 解体新書) on April 30, 2021. The "fan book" includes character profiles, concept art, new manga stories, and an interview with Tatsuki Fujimoto.

An exhibition of Kaku's manuscripts and illustrations from the series was held at Tokyo Manga Salon Trigger from November 3–9, 2018. Another exhibition was held at Tower Records in Shibuya from August 29 to September 22, 2020, where collaborative goods designed just for the event were sold.

A stage play adaptation ran at Hulic Hall in Tokyo from February 16 to 26, 2023. A second play, titled Hell's Paradise -Final Chapter-, ran at Theatre 1010 in Tokyo and at the TT Hall of the Cool Japan Park in Osaka from February 15 to 25, 2024.

== Reception ==
=== Sales ===
In August 2018, Hell's Paradise: Jigokuraku was cited as the most popular series on Shōnen Jump+. Over 1 million copies of the series were in circulation by June 2019, a number that grew to 2.5 million by August 2020, and more than 3.6 million by April 2021. By December 2022, the manga had over 4 million copies in circulation. By January 2024, it had over 6.5 million copies in circulation.

The second volume of the series sold 16,328 copies during its first week of release. The fourth and fifth volumes sold 20,139 and 45,912 copies, respectively, in their first weeks. The thirteenth and final volume of the series sold 39,759 copies in its first week.

=== Critical reception ===
Weekly news magazine Publishers Weekly wrote the first volume was "mysterious" and discussed Kaku's illustrations, comparing them to the likes of manga artist Junji Ito, which in their opinion gave the series an "unsettling" and "gruesome" charm. Comic Book Bin's Leroy Douresseaux gave the first volume a score of 9 out of 10, writing that it was "best first volumes of a manga tankōbon graphic novel that [he] had ever read. He stated that Kaku enthralls readers with the mysteries of the island while his illustrations are "like taking some of the most shocking art from the legendary EC Comics' horror titles and multiplying it by the power of 10." Kiara Halls of Comic Book Resources called the first volume a "great, emotional bloodbath" that provides "bloody, classic shonen action with uncommonly sincere emotional depth." She explained that while establishing the relationship between Sagiri and Gabimaru forms the crux of the volume, it's an uncommon one as their bond is "of mutual respect formed by an emotional connection", not of dominance or lust. That coupled with "solid, detailed art and supernatural intrigue", had Halls call the series a potential breakout hit.

Reviewing the first volume for Anime News Network, both Rebecca Silverman and Faye Hopper gave it 3.5 stars out of 5. They praised Sagiri and Gabimaru's relationship, with Hopper stating the way their struggles mirror and allow each other to empathize and grow despite their opposed roles is executed with "thoughtfulness and real power, and imbues a gritty, gory seinen with heart." Silverman felt that despite containing elements derivative of other works, Hell's Paradise: Jigokuraku manages to turn them into "a story worth paying attention to" and is entertaining. Hopper wrote that while the violent manga is not for everyone, it has terrific, macabre art, a solid hook, and rich characters, and she admires it for showing how "casual, uncritical brutality hurts the soul, and that revulsion to it is normal and should be accepted."

In his review of the second volume, Ian Wolf of Anime UK News gave it a rating of 6/10, highlighting the fight sequences and Kaku's artwork as standout features, and noted that the story expands on character backgrounds through flashbacks, further developing the world and escalating the peril for the cast. Crunchyroll's editor Amílcar Trejo Mosquera considered the series to be part of Shōnen Jump's "Dark Trio", alongside Jujutsu Kaisen and Chainsaw Man.

=== Accolades ===
With 16,510 votes, Hell's Paradise: Jigokuraku came in at eleventh place in the Web Manga category of the 2018 Next Manga Awards, organized by Niconico and Da Vinci magazine. The series ranked fourth on Honya Club's Nationwide Bookstore Employees' Recommended Comics of 2018 list, compiled by surveying 1,100 professional bookstore employees in Japan. In the 2019 edition of Kono Manga ga Sugoi!, which surveys people in the manga and publishing industry, Hell's Paradise: Jigokuraku was one of the three series tied for sixteenth place on its list of the best manga series for male readers.
