= Yuji Kaku =

Japanese manga artist

Yuji Kaku 賀来ゆうじ
- Area: Manga artist
- Notable works: Hell's Paradise: Jigokuraku
- Collaborators: Tatsuki Fujimoto
- Relatives: Takeshi Tsuruno (cousin)

Yuji Kaku (Japanese: 賀来ゆうじ, Hepburn: Kaku Yūji) is a Japanese manga artist. Originally an editor, Kaku began working as manga artist in 2009 with Memory Customs, a one-shot published in Jump Square. In 2013, he launched his first series, Fantasma. After working as an assistant to Tatsuki Fujimoto, Kaku launched his second series, Hell's Paradise: Jigokuraku, in Shōnen Jump+, which quickly became the most popular manga on the platform. It was adapted into an anime in 2023.

== Biography ==
As a child, Kaku often spent time painting and practicing swordplay with his cousin, Takeshi Tsuruno. Tsuruno feels this swordplay experience would influence Kaku's later works. Kaku entered the manga industry in 2007, when he began working as an editor for Weekly Shōnen Champion. After leaving Akita Shoten in 2008, Kaku wrote a one-shot, titled Memory Customs, which was published in Jump Square in 2009. It later received an honorable mention in the Jump Square Comic Grand Prix. In 2013, Kaku began his first full series, Fantasma. It was serialized in Jump Square until the following year. From 2016 to 2018, Kaku worked as an assistant to Tatsuki Fujimoto with his work on Fire Punch.

In 2018, Kaku began serializing Hell's Paradise: Jigokuraku on the Shōnen Jump+ website, where it ran until 2021. The series quickly grew in popularity. By August 2018, it was the most popular series on Shōnen Jump+. In the same year, it also ranked eleventh in the Next Manga Award in the web manga category. In the 2019 edition of Kono Manga ga Sugoi!, the series was one of three series tied for 16th place on its list of the top manga series for male readers. An anime adaptation of the series has also been produced. In 2021, Kaku began serializing Ayashimon in Weekly Shōnen Jump, where it ran until 2022.

== Works ==
=== One-shots ===
- Memory Customs (おもいで税関, Omoide Zeikan) (2009) (published in Jump Square)
- Jailbreak Princess (脱獄姫, Datsugoku Hime) (2016) (published in Jump SQ. Crown)

=== Manga series ===
- Fantasma (ファンタズマ, Fantazuma) (2013–2014) (serialized in Jump Square)
- Hell's Paradise: Jigokuraku (地獄楽, Jigokuraku) (2018–2021) (serialized in Shōnen Jump+)
- Ayashimon (アヤシモン) (2021–2022) (serialized in Weekly Shōnen Jump)
