= List of places of scenic beauty of Japan (Kanagawa) =

This list is of the places of scenic beauty of Japan that are located within the Prefecture of Kanagawa.

== National Places of Scenic Beauty ==
As of 1 January 2021, six Places have been designated at a national level.

Site	Municipality	Comments	Image	Coordinates	Type	Ref.
Engaku-ji Gardens 円覚寺庭園; Engakuji teien	Kamakura	also a Historic Site		35°20′12″N 139°32′43″E	1, 8	
Kenchō-ji Gardens 建長寺庭園; Kenchōji teien	Kamakura	also a Historic Site		35°19′56″N 139°33′20″E	1, 8	
Sankei-en 三溪園; Sankei-en	Yokohama			35°25′00″N 139°39′34″E	1	
Yamate Park 山手公園; Yamate kōen	Yokohama			35°26′06″N 139°38′54″E	1	
Zuisen-ji Gardens 瑞泉寺庭園; Zuisenji teien	Kamakura			35°19′38″N 139°34′32″E	1	
Shinsenkyō 神仙郷; Shinsenkyō	Hakone			35°14′53″N 139°02′36″E		

== Prefectural Places of Scenic Beauty ==
As of 1 May 2020, three Places have been designated at a prefectural level.

Site	Municipality	Comments	Image	Coordinates	Type	Ref.
Tenjinjima, Kasajima, and Surrounding Waters 天神島、笠島及び周辺水域; Tenjinjima, Kasajima oyobi shūhen suiiki	Yokosuka	also a Prefectural Natural Monument		35°13′19″N 139°36′12″E		
Enoshima 江ノ島; Enoshima	Fujisawa	also a Prefectural Historic Site		35°17′59″N 139°28′49″E		
Shasui Falls 洒水の滝; Shasui-no-taki	Yamakita			35°21′09″N 139°03′41″E		

== Municipal Places of Scenic Beauty ==
As of 1 May 2020, five Places have been designated at a municipal level.

== Registered Places of Scenic Beauty ==
As of 1 January 2021, six Monuments have been registered (as opposed to designated) as Places of Scenic Beauty at a national level.

Place	Municipality	Comments	Image	Coordinates	Type	Ref.
Onshi Hakone Park 恩賜箱根公園; Onshi Hakone kōen	Hakone			35°11′46″N 139°01′35″E		
Gōra Park 強羅公園; Gōra kōen	Hakone			35°14′55″N 139°02′42″E		
Shinsenkyō 神仙郷; Shinsenkyō	Hakone			35°14′53″N 139°02′36″E		
Nihon Ōdōri 日本大通り; Nihon ōdōri	Yokohama			35°26′47″N 139°38′33″E		
Yamashita Park 山下公園; Yamashita kōen	Yokohama			35°26′44″N 139°39′00″E		
Yokohama Park 横浜公園; Yokohama kōen	Yokohama			35°26′37″N 139°38′25″E		

== See also ==
- Cultural Properties of Japan
- List of parks and gardens of Kanagawa Prefecture
- List of Historic Sites of Japan (Kanagawa)
