= List of Black Rock Shooter episodes =

Black Rock Shooter is the name of both a 2010 original video animation (OVA) and a 2012 anime television series, based on the character created by illustrator Huke. Produced by Ordet, the series, which both feature their own story lines, focus on two worlds, the human world involving the life of a girl named Mato Kuroi and her friendship with Yomi Takanashi, and the other world, where a mysterious girl known as Black Rock Shooter fights fierce battles. The OVA is directed and written by Shinobu Yoshioka, with Nagaru Tanigawa co-writing, Yūsuke Matsuo designing the characters based on Huke's original concepts and ryo composing the music, and was first announced in August 2009, with a pilot edition released on DVD and Blu-ray Disc (BD) on September 30, 2009. The full 50-minute OVA was bundled with various magazines from July 24, 2010, before receiving a retail release on DVD and BD on December 17, 2010. The ending theme for the OVA is "Braveheart" by The Gomband.

The anime television series aired on Fuji TV's Noitamina block between February 2 and March 22, 2012. It is directed by Shinobu Yoshioka, with Hiroyuki Imaishi directing the CG sequences, Mari Okada writing the scripts, Yūsuke Yoshigaki designing the characters based on Huke's original concepts and Hideharu Mori composing the music. The series was released on DVD and BD on June 22, 2012, in a box set containing the original soundtrack and an Insane Black Rock Shooter Figma figurine. The opening theme is "Black Rock Shooter" (ブラック★ロックシューダー, Burakku Rokku Shūtā) by Supercell sung by Hatsune Miku, while the ending theme is "Bokura no Ashiato" (僕らのあしあと, Our Footsteps) by Supercell sung by Koeda.

On September 16, 2021, a new anime television series titled Black Rock Shooter: Dawn Fall was announced. It is produced by Bibury Animation Studios and Bibury Animation CG and directed by Tensho, with scripts written by Makoto Fukami in cooperation with Ryō Yoshigami. Character designs are provided by Masayuki Nonaka and Yō Nakagawa, both of whom also serving as chief animation directors. It aired from April 3 to June 19, 2022, on Tokyo MX and other networks. The opening theme is "Aseed" by Zaq, while the ending theme is "Before the Nightmare" by Kanako Takatsuki. Disney licensed the anime as one of its first in a move to release more Asian-produced content on its streaming platform Disney+.

== Series overview ==
Season	Episodes	Originally released	
Season	Episodes	First released	Last released
OVA		July 24, 2010	
1	8	February 2, 2012	March 22, 2012
2	12	April 3, 2022	June 19, 2022

== Episode list ==
=== Black Rock Shooter (2010) ===
No.	Title	Directed by (Note: Information is taken from the ending credits of each episode.)	Written by	Original release date
OVA	"Black★Rock Shooter"; Transliteration: "Burakku★Rokku Shūtā" (Japanese: ブラック★ロックシューター)	Shinobu Yoshioka	Nagaru Tanigawa, Shinobu Yoshioka	July 24, 2010
Mato Kuroi makes friends with a girl named Yomi Takanashi who recently moved to the town. Mato quickly joins the basketball club, which incites Yomi to join the volleyball club since both clubs practice at the same time in the gymnasium. The two spend much time together over the following year, and during one outing Mato gives Yomi the same phone charm she has. In their second year of junior high, they end up in different classes, reducing the amount of time they can spend together. Furthermore, Yomi starts to become jealous of Mato hanging around her basketball club manager and classmate, Yū Kōtari. When Yomi seemingly disappears, Mato becomes concerned when she does not show up at school the next day or respond to her text messages. Mato becomes further depressed when she receives word that Yomi has been reported missing and is asked about her whereabouts by two detectives. One day, Mato receives a blank text message from Yomi and goes to her favorite spot in town where she finds the phone charm she gave her. The charm starts to glow and transports her to a strange world where she meets Black Rock Shooter, a mysterious girl with a blazing blue eye. She then merges with Black Rock Shooter and duels an evil being called Dead Master, which is the embodiment of Yomi's jealousy. During their fight, the possessed Yomi almost falls to her death, but Black Rock Shooter saves and embraces her, causing her body to be freed from Dead Master. Yomi and Mato return to their normal lives, but Yū begins to act strangely, implying the same fate that befell Yomi will happen to her as well.

=== Black Rock Shooter (2012) ===
No. overall	No. in season	Title (Note: Each of the episodes are named after lyrics from the eponymous song by Supercell. English titles taken from UK DVD release by Manga Entertainment.)	Directed by	Storyboarded by	Original release date
1	1	"How Much More Do I Have to Scream?"; Transliteration: "Ato Dore Dake Sakebeba Ii no Darō" (Japanese: あとどれだけ叫べばいいのだろう)	Shinobu Yoshioka, Hiroyuki Imaishi	Shinobu Yoshioka, Hiroyuki Imaishi	February 2, 2012
In another world, the eponymous Black Rock Shooter battles a mysterious, red-eyed opponent. Meanwhile, in the human world, Mato enters middle school and takes an interest in her classmate, Yomi. The two quickly become friends due to their common fondness for a book from their childhood. After inviting Mato to her house, Yomi becomes worried when Kagari Izuriha, a wheelchair-user who wants to keep Yomi to herself, arrives and acts with hostility towards Mato, causing her to become frightened. Meanwhile, in the other world, Black Rock Shooter follows a green trail to a wasteland filled with broken toys where she is attacked by a girl resembling Kagari named Chariot. After speaking with the student counselor, Saya Irino, Mato renews her determination to become good friends with Yomi and invites her to go to a festival with her. In the meantime, before Black Rock Shooter can prepare a counterattack against Chariot, she is stopped by a girl covered in chains named Dead Master.
2	2	"Dawn Envelopes the Sky"; Transliteration: "Yoake o Idaku Sora" (Japanese: 夜明けを抱く空)	Yoshikazu Ui, Hiroyuki Imaishi	Moto Horinouchi, Hiroyuki Imaishi	February 9, 2012
As Black Rock Shooter continues her struggle against Chariot and Dead Master, Mato waits at the festival for Yomi, but she never arrives, since Kagari wouldn't allow her to leave. That night, Mato dreams of the fight between Black Rock Shooter and Dead Master, who has a heart carved into her chest. Chariot turns on Dead Master and captures her with Black Rock Shooter in pursuit. Mato discovers Yomi has the same scar the next day. After consulting with Saya, who explains dreams serve as bonds between friends, Mato goes to Yomi's house, but Kagari stops Yomi from seeing her by throwing herself down the stairs. As Kagari is admitted into hospital with a broken wrist, Yomi's mother explains to Mato that Kagari was hit by a car while running after Yomi. Although nothing was wrong with her legs, Kagari used it as an excuse to become more dependent on Yomi. Determined in her belief that Yomi shouldn't suffer for that, Mato pleads to go home with Yomi, calling her by her first name, helping Yomi realize her true feelings, which are to be earnest friends with both Mato and Kagari. After Dead Master manages to break free from her chains, she is captured by a woman named Black Gold Saw. As Chariot launches an attack against Black Rock Shooter in the confusion, she is killed, which causes Kagari to shortly outburst before calming down, seemingly returning to normal.
3	3	"Tears Held Back Threaten to Spill Over"; Transliteration: "Koraeta Namida ga Afuresō na no" (Japanese: こらえた涙があふれそうなの)	Toshiya Shinohara, Hiroyuki Imaishi	Toshiya Shinohara, Hiroyuki Imaishi	February 16, 2012
As Mato prepares to go to training camp with her basketball club, Yomi starts to become jealous of Mato's childhood friend, Yū. Mato has more dreams involving Black Gold Saw during camp, and at the same time, Saya takes an interest in Yomi. Upon returning to school, the basketball coach, Arata Kohata, discovers a love letter she wrote for a boy she liked had been posted for all to see. Although she holds back tears in front of the crowd, she comes to realize those laughing behind her back when she is taunted by Saya. In the other world, Black Rock Shooter attacks Black Gold Saw's hideout, killing her minions, one of which resemble Arata. Simultaneously in the human word, Arata experiences a sudden pain in her head and falls unconscious in front of Mato.
4	4	"The World I Once Dreamt of Closes"; Transliteration: "Itsuka Yumemita Sekai ga Tojiru" (Japanese: いつか夢見た世界が閉じる)	Hiroshi Kobayashi, Hiroyuki Imaishi	Hiroshi Kobayashi	February 23, 2012
In the other world, another being named Strength is seen throwing Chariot's corpse off a cliff. Meanwhile, Kagari starts going to school and starts making friends which, on top of Mato's duties with her club, causes Yomi to feel unwanted. As Kagari asks Mato for some advice on how to cheer up Yomi, they stumble upon Yomi arguing with Kagari's friends, saying something she soon regrets and locking herself in her room, ignoring Kagari's visits. The next day, the boy Arata confessed to the other day tries to apologize to her, but she has no memory of him. Meanwhile, Yomi falls further into depression when she receives a text from Yū. Believing Kagari to be the only one who would need her, Yomi snaps when Kagari mentions that she has no memory of ever needing her. This has an effect on the other world, as Dead Master emerges with a darker personality and stands off against Black Rock Shooter.
5	5	"Black★Rock Shooter"; Transliteration: "Burakku★Rokku Shūtā" (Japanese: ブラック★ロックシューター)	Tatsumi Fujii, Akira Amemiya	Yumi Kamakura, Akira Amemiya	March 1, 2012
As Black Rock Shooter fights against a huge undead army under Dead Master's control, Yomi behaves strangely at school, cutting her hair in class, causing Mato to become concerned, even lashing out at Kagari. As Yū becomes cautious of Saya's actions, Mato sees the battle between Black Rock Shooter and Dead Master in her sleep. As Mato visits Saya the next day, Saya tries to strangle her, leaving her confounded. After seeing the painting Yomi drew of her, Mato comes to realize that is because of her that Yomi is suffering. She soon discovers that no-one in the basketball club remembers Yū, soon finding her own memories of her to be false; there is even a vacant lot where Yū's house is supposed to be. Yū then appears before her, telling her that the other world in her dreams is real. She explains how the people in the other world represent the sorrow upon their real-world counterparts, and if they are killed, the person forgets about their attachments that caused them that grief, meaning if Dead Master is killed, Yomi would forget all about her. Offering Mato the chance to save Yomi without resorting to fighting, Yū puts her into a deep sleep, sending her mind into that of Black Rock Shooter, only to find she had just killed Dead Master. The shock of this causes Black Rock Shooter's blazing blue eye to become purple.
6	6	"Hope That Time There Shouldn't Have Been Any"; Transliteration: "Aru Hazu mo Nai Ano Toki no Kibō" (Japanese: あるはずもないあの時の希望)	Tsurutarō Ōzu, Akira Amemiya	Tsurutarō Ōzu, Akira Amemiya	March 8, 2012
As Mato breaks down from what she had just done, Black Rock Shooter transforms into a more psychotic and armored form known as Insane Black Rock Shooter and stands against Black Gold Saw. As Black Rock Shooter rips off her own arm to fight against Black Gold Saw, Mato passes out from the pain, preventing Yū from calling her back to her body. She brings her to Saya, who wanted to prevent Black Rock Shooter from causing destruction in the other world but can't bring herself to kill Mato in order to do so. Instead, Saya has Yū transport her mind to Black Gold Saw's so she can try to talk with Mato. Saya talks about how she befriended Yū, who had been constantly bullied at both home and school. One night, when Yū's house caught fire, Saya wrongly assumed Yū was responsible and felt guilty. When Saya found her the next day, she asked Saya to protect her and awakened her connection to Black Gold Saw. Back in the present, Strength steps in to fight Black Rock Shooter in Black Gold Saw's place, allowing Saya to return. As Strength overwhelms Black Rock Shooter in battle, Yomi returns to school with no apparent memory of Mato.
7	7	"Make a Wish on a Star Racing Through the Darkness"; Transliteration: "Yami o Kakeru Hoshi ni Negai o" (Japanese: 闇を駆ける星に願いを)	Shinpei Ezaki, Hiroyuki Imaishi	Shinpei Ezaki, Akira Amemiya, Hiroyuki Imaishi	March 15, 2012
As Saya finds she is no longer able to connect with Black Gold Saw, Yū sends her own mind to that of Strength's to try and talk to Mato, who finally regains consciousness and attempts to hold back Black Rock Shooter. However, Mato starts to hesitate when she realizes how she had been running away from her own feelings. Just then, Strength starts to speak and goes berserk on Black Rock Shooter, revealing she is actually the real Yū. Strength, the Yū that Mato knew, explains how she gained emotions when Yū, who was filled with an extraordinary amount of sorrow, was able to contact her, stopping her from dying at the hands of Black Rock Shooter. Finding a world of fighting better than the world she lived in, Yū decided to switch places with Strength so that she would have to face reality instead. Meanwhile, as word reaches school that Mato had not returned home, Yomi feels a pain in her heart and remembers her friendship with her, which in turn causes Dead Master to reawaken.
8	8	"Let's Go Beyond This World"; Transliteration: "Sekai o Koete" (Japanese: 世界を超えて)	Shinobu Yoshioka, Hiroyuki Imaishi	Shinobu Yoshioka, Hiroyuki Imaishi	March 22, 2012
As Strength prepares to sacrifice herself in order to stop Yū, Mato becomes determined to stop Black Rock Shooter from killing her. She ends up inside a blue world, where she herself is Black Rock Shooter, standing against Insane Black Rock Shooter. As Kagari and Arata also recover their painful memories, the revived people of the other world combine their strengths to give Mato the power to defeat Insane Black Rock Shooter, uniting the world as one. Upon regaining herself, Mato finds Strength in a weakened state, who assures Yū that she'll be able to make friends in the real world and gives her thanks to Mato before disappearing into the wind. Afterwards, Yū returns to her original body whilst Mato, having regained consciousness, reunites with Yomi. As life returns to normal, Arata starts dating the boy she confessed to, Mato, Yomi, Kagari and Yū all become friends together whilst Strength is resurrected, alongside Black Rock Shooter. The episode ends with Black Rock Shooter saying she will continue fighting.

=== Black Rock Shooter: Dawn Fall (2022) ===
No. overall	No. in season	Title	Directed by	Written by	Storyboarded by	Original release date
9	1	"The Good, The Bad & The Mechanics"	Tenshō	Makoto Fukami	Tenshō	April 3, 2022 (Note: This episode was pre-screened on February 25, 2022.)
In a post-apocalyptic wasteland, Empress/Black Rock Shooter, Dead Master, and Strength battle robots, but are defeated. A woman, Lunatic, gloats that they failed. Twenty years later in 2062, humanity still has a resistance against the machines. In an underground laboratory, Black Rock Shooter breaks free from a pod, remembering nothing except Lighthouse No. 8. She finds clothes and a gun and meets a brother-sister team of scavengers, Norito and Miya. A robot attacks them, but she smashes it with her bare hands. On the surface, more robots attack, but a talking motorcycle, Black Trike, that calls her Empress activates and offers its services, so they ride it to safety. Learning of Empress' return, Lunatic meets Sukuruma Stars Smiley and they assemble their troops. Empress and the siblings meet the army and the Colonel recognizes her, but is disappointed to learn she has amnesia. He explains an AI called Artemis declared war on humanity and is building a space elevator to bring its troops from the Moon to Earth, so they must destroy it. More robots attack and he orders her to leave the siblings behind. She refuses and summons a cannon to blast the main robot, but it survives and the cannon disappears. Strength appears and smashes the robot, but then attacks her.
10	2	"Shooter Meets Hacker"	Tenshō	Makoto Fukami	Tenshō	April 10, 2022
Strength is infuriated when Empress does not recognize her and attacks while blaming her for all her pain. Empress summons her cannon, but it has no ammo, so she escapes on Black Trike, along with the siblings and the Colonel in his Humvee, the only survivor of his unit. They go to the siblings' hometown, where he explains Empress is also called Black Rock Shooter. She, Strength, and others were members of the Hemitheos Units, girls created for combat. She asks about Lighthouse No. 8, but they have never heard of it. A mechanic, Monica Kaburagi, offers to guide them to a military base in exchange for being allowed to examine Empress and Black Trike. Norito asks for help getting supplies from a hospital guarded by mechanical bees. The Colonel refuses, but relents when Empress agrees. Monica instructs her to absorb machines to recharge her cannon. Empress distracts the bees while the others get the supplies. She is almost killed while protecting Norito, but Strength saves her. Strength asks why she wastes time protecting weaklings. When she says they are worth saving, Strength angrily leaves on her own talking motorcycle. Empress, the Colonel, and Monica leave the siblings in their town and drive away. While making camp, Empress asks Black Trike about Lighthouse No. 8, but its files on it are locked. Suddenly, Smiley's troops approach and the Colonel says they are from the Educational Institution.
11	3	"Master Sniper"	Tenshō	Makoto Fukami	Kazuo Miyake	April 17, 2022
The Colonel explains the Educational Institution is a genocidal Artemis-worshiping cult. Empress saves a girl the troops are chasing. The girl, Momiji, says she is one of Smiley's escaped slaves, and a train with more slave girls is coming. In their base, Smiley's subordinate Charlotte watches as he rapes a slave to death. A minion informs him of Momiji's escape and he orders her found. As the group waits at the train tracks, Dead Master attacks them with a sniper rifle and destroys Empress' right arm before they take cover. Her arm slowly regenerates and Monica says it will heal faster if she absorbs some machines. They destroy the track to try to halt the train, but the robots escorting it repair the track. The group battles the robots and troops. Dead Master arrives on a motorcycle and gives them covering fire while also attacking Empress, saying she loves her and will be the one to kill her. They lose her and separate the car containing the slaves. Empress, Momiji, and the Colonel enter and try to unlock their cage, but Smiley remotely detonates a bomb. Empress detects it and pushes the Colonel out just as it explodes, killing everyone inside except Empress, who cries about her failure. Her arm finishes regenerating and the trio sadly drives away, with Dead Master following at a distance.
12	4	"Black falls down a hole"	Tenshō	Makoto Fukami	Kazuo Miyake	April 24, 2022
Angry about sacrificing his slaves for nothing, Smiley orders Charlotte to kill Empress; she leaves on a mini-jet. The trio meets an army unit and Captain Bolt says the space elevator will be complete in a month. He also tells Empress and Monica that the Colonel lost his wife and daughter to the Educational Institution ten years ago. As they head for the space elevator, Dead Master arrives and says she also has memory problems, but she knows this world is too wicked to be saved, so she will kill Empress and then herself to spare them the pain, while also seeing Monica as a love rival. She is about to attack when Charlotte arrives and bombs the convoy, killing many. A shocked Colonel realizes she is his daughter, but she completely ignores him and leaves her jet to beat up Empress. Dead Master attacks her, but Charlotte destroys her arm and leg and beats her up. Empress remembers telling Lunatic that she will never give up; she revives and destroys Charlotte's weapon with her cannon, causing her to flee. Empress hugs the slowly regenerating Dead Master and says she doesn't want her to die, then decides to take her with them. The Colonel is depressed for thinking Charlotte was dead all this time, so Empress proposes the convoy will take a detour to pursue her.
13	5	"Drink because you are happy"	Tenshō	Ryō Yoshigami	Tenshō	May 1, 2022
In a bar, Strength remembers being childhood friends with Empress, then being crucified by the machines, so she drinks until she vomits. Norito staggers in begging for help because the Educational Institution raided his town and abducted Miya. She refuses, but the EI's troops appear and attack her. They destroy her weapons, forcing her and Norito to flee. Empress' group, aided by Dead Master, raid an EI base and learn from the computer that Miya is scheduled for a human sacrifice. Losing her weapons made Strength revert to a shy, child-like personality. Norito comforts her, but eventually betrays her to the EI's troops, saying they promised to release Miya if he did. However, when they attempt to execute her, he attacks them and allows her to partially recreate her weapons and escape. Strength rants that she knew humans could not be trusted, but decides to do the right thing. The EI's troops attempt to hang Norito, but Strength saves him, then Empress and Dead Master arrive and help her absorb a machine to repair her weapons and defeat them. Empress says they are headed to Smiley's base to rescue Miya and they ride off together with Strength deciding to stop drinking. Meanwhile, Smiley has just raped Miya.
14	6	"Collapse"	Yūichirō Aoki, Ken Takahashi	Makoto Fukami	Ken Takahashi	May 8, 2022
Smiley tells Miya that as the first slave to survive sex with him, she will be modified into a Hemitheos Unit to bear his children. Strength and Norito infiltrate the Educational Institution's mobile base while the others attack it as a distraction. Smiley takes on a monstrous form and battles Empress while Charlotte battles Dead Master. Lunatic puts Miya in a pod for modification, but complains that she needs Smiley's help. Strength and Norito find the corpses of previous slaves and then Lunatic, and Strength attacks after remembering being tortured by her. Captain Bolt sacrifices himself by ramming Smiley with his Humvee, allowing Empress to blast a hole in him with her cannon while Dead Master shoots down Charlotte's jet. Lunatic, who claims to be an avatar of Artemis, overpowers and strangles Strength, but when she realizes Smiley was defeated, she escapes with Charlotte. They free Miya and after learning what Smiley was trying to do, wonder why he did not try to impregnate Charlotte since she is a Hemitheos Unit. As the siblings leave, Black Trike says it was damaged and needs repairs. As everyone resumes course for the space elevator, Empress says she still wants to go to Lighthouse No. 8, their old home.
15	7	"Peacebuilding Force Memorial Library"	Kōsuke Hirota	Makoto Fukami	Kōsuke Murayama	May 15, 2022
In 2051, the Colonel plays baseball with Charlotte and promises to defeat the machines to give her a safe future. In the present, Black Trike breaks down, so the group salvages a scrapyard for parts. Empress finds a baseball, saddening the Colonel. The machines approach and Monica says the Peacebuilding Force Memorial Library has the parts they need, so they have Dead Master guard Black Trike and go to the library. They meet a friendly librarian droid, Andy. Monica asks Andy about the Colonel; his files say his wife Jessica worked on nanomachines before her death. Monica suddenly falls through the floor and meets a stray drone of the machine army. The Colonel destroys it, but Andy sadly says it was Thomas, his friend. Empress asks Andy why Artemis rebelled against humanity and he says it did after getting perfect scores on ethics tests like the trolley problem. She asks about Lighthouse No. 8 and he says it is a military base. They find the parts they need and the Colonel gives Andy the baseball as a parting gift. Black Trike is repaired and they resume their journey. Empress asks Strength and Dead Master about the trolley problem and their answers make her laugh. Charlotte enters the library and destroys Andy, saying she will destroy everything associated with Empress.
16	8	"Crossing Iron Oceans"	Yūichirō Aoki	Ryō Yoshigami	Tenshō	May 22, 2022
The space elevator will be complete in 14 days. A ship agrees to help the group cross the Iron Ocean, a polluted sea inhabited by mechanical animals. Monica is troubled that the captain is Isana, her ex-girlfriend who abandoned her. Isana privately reveals to the Colonel that she is ill from pollution exposure and may not have long to live. The crew warns them that firing a weapon will attract the machines. They find an island of junk and decide to salvage it to power up the girls. Empress and Strength find a huge robot's core, but are chased by a giant robot bug. Dead Master, who is afraid of bugs, panics and shoots it, causing all the machines to chase the ship. Isana volunteers to sacrifice herself by luring the machines away, but collapses from her illness, so Monica takes her on a motorboat to lure the machines, reaffirming their love and deciding to die together. Empress absorbs the core and is able to destroy the machines and save them both, but collapses with a fever. The ship reaches shore and they meet another army unit preparing to assault the space elevator. Isana is given payment and a deed to land in San Diego. She invites Monica to come with her, but she says she will see the mission through to the end.
17	9	"Half Mechanic"	Yūichirō Aoki	Ryō Yoshigami	Kōsuke Murayama	May 29, 2022
In the past, Smiley slept with Charlotte, but couldn't impregnate her. Jessica tried to rescue her, but was gunned down. In the present, Lunatic puts Smiley in a healing pod and tells Charlotte to kill Empress. The group arrives in Bogotá where the space elevator is, but goes to Lighthouse No. 8 to cure Empress' fever. Empress, Dead Master, and Strength remember the past. They were orphans in the lighthouse raised and trained by Jessica, and given their names from Tarot cards. They find the lighthouse in ruins and directions to a laboratory in an emerald mine. Inside, they find a recording from Jessica explaining she created Hemitheos Units to improve humanity and that she herself is one called Stella, apologizing to her husband, David, for keeping secrets. She made lighthouses all over the world to raise them, but they were all killed except for Empress, Dead Master, and Strength. Smiley captured her and Charlotte, and she begs Empress to save her daughter from Smiley's brainwashing. They put Empress in a pod to cure her fever. The Educational Institution's troops attack and everyone fights them. While defending the pod from Charlotte, David tries to remind her that he is her father, but she strangles him and says Smiley is her father. Empress emerges and knocks her away.
18	10	"Titanomachia"	Yūichirō Aoki	Ryō Yoshigami	Kōsuke Murayama	June 5, 2022
In the past, Lunatic impaled Empress and showed her Strength and Dead Master had been tortured into insanity. In the present, Lunatic blasts Strength and Dead Master with an orbital weapon, then leaves after sending Smiley, who captures and tortures them. Empress defeats Charlotte and Monica puts her in the pod to remove her brainwashing. As David joins the battle against the Educational Institution, Empress pursues Smiley and rescues her friends by activating her Overdrive Key, a mode that increases her physical abilities at the cost of incredible strain. Smiley decides to make Empress his bride and chases them. He beats Empress up, but all three of them remember the past; Empress used her Overdrive Key to escape Lunatic and free them, but had to enter the pod in the underground laboratory to recover. Now knowing that Empress never abandoned them, Strength and Dead Master help Empress completely obliterate Smiley with her cannon. Monica removes Charlotte from the pod, but she holds Monica hostage with a knife. They are almost crushed by a rock slide, but David saves them. They regroup and are overjoyed that Charlotte finally accepts David as her father. Later, some soldiers notice that the Iron Ocean is rising.
19	11	"The Moon Is a Harsh Mistress"	Yūichirō Aoki	Makoto Fukami	Tenshō, Shigeyuki Miya	June 12, 2022
Isana is apparently killed by a meteorite. The group finds the Iron Ocean has gathered around the space elevator and deduces it is being sucked up the elevator. As they prepare for the final battle, David does not want the weakened Charlotte to participate. Empress thanks him for everything and they share a drink. Monica leaves the group, saying she fulfilled her mission. Empress, Dead Master, and Strength vow to survive. They attack the space elevator's guards while Charlotte is driven away in a truck. Lunatic arrives, decimates the human army, and beats up Empress and David. Dead Master and Strength are surrounded by robots. Lunatic explains the Iron Ocean is used to fuel a nuclear reactor on the Moon which powers a magnetic device to attract meteorites. The process has already begun and meteorites are being launched to wipe out humanity. They ask why she is doing this and she says she is one with Artemis. Artemis was originally designed to terraform other planets, but after researching humanity and concepts like death, decided to terraform the Earth and wipe out native species to allow any alien life to settle there, no matter how long it takes. If the alien life is unsatisfactory, she will repeat the process.
20	12	"Black Rock Shooter"	Tenshō, Yūichirō Aoki	Makoto Fukami	Tenshō, Shigeyuki Miya	June 19, 2022
Lunatic asks Empress to join her, but Empress attacks while David runs for the space elevator. Norito and Miya meet Monica and persuade her to go back and help. Charlotte returns and helps her father, but David is mortally wounded. Norito and Monica save a heartbroken Charlotte from machines. When Black Trike is destroyed, an enraged Empress uses her Overdrive Key, but it is still not enough and Lunatic overwhelms her. Dead Master tries to save her and declares her love for Empress before Lunatic kills her, while Strength is killed by machines. With nothing left to lose, Empress unleashes her limiters and obliterates Lunatic and the space elevator with her cannon, then disintegrates. On the Moon, Artemis notes 70% of the population was killed, but her plans were delayed for about 200 years. Several years later, an elderly Monica, an adult Colonel Norito, and an unaging Charlotte and Miya who became a Hemitheos Unit, train child clones of Strength and Dead Master. Monica tells Charlotte and Miya to choose a Tarot card that suits them: Charlotte picks Temperance and Miya picks Wheel of Fortune. When they are ready, the crew except for Monica boards a spaceship with Black Trike's salvaged AI and launches a preemptive strike on the Moon. As they battle Artemis' defenses, they are overjoyed when Empress regenerates in space to fight by their side.
