= Black Rock Shooter =

Japanese media franchise

- Cover of the "Pilot Edition" DVD released by Good Smile Company, featuring the title character.

ブラック★ロックシューター (Burakku Rokku Shūtā)
- Genre: Drama; Fantasy; Supernatural action
- Created by: Huke
- Original video animation
- Directed by: Shinobu Yoshioka
- Produced by: Takanori Aki
- Written by: Nagaru Tanigawa; Shinobu Yoshioka
- Music by: Ryo
- Studio: Ordet
- Released: July 24, 2010
- Runtime: 50 minutes
- Video game

Petite Rock Shooter
- Developer: Imageepoch
- Genre: RPG
- Platform: Browser game
- Released: March 9, 2011
- Manga

Black Rock-chan
- Written by: Ringo
- Published by: Kadokawa Shoten
- Magazine: 4-Koma Nano Ace
- Original run: March 9, 2011 – February 9, 2012
- Volumes: 1
- Manga

Black Rock Shooter: Innocent Soul
- Written by: Sanami Suzuki
- Published by: Kadokawa Shoten
- Magazine: Young Ace
- Original run: June 4, 2011 – May 4, 2012
- Volumes: 3
- Manga

Black Rock Shooter: The Game
- Written by: TNSK
- Published by: Kadokawa Shoten
- Magazine: Comptiq
- Original run: August 10, 2011 – August 10, 2012
- Volumes: 2
- Anime television series
- Directed by: Shinobu Yoshioka; Hiroyuki Imaishi (CG Battle)
- Produced by: Hiroshi Nakamura; Hiroaki Matsuura
- Written by: Mari Okada
- Music by: Hideharu Mori
- Studio: Ordet; Sanzigen
- Licensed by: AUS: Siren Visual; NA: Discotek Media; UK: Manga Entertainment
- Original network: Fuji TV (Noitamina)
- Original run: February 2, 2012 – March 22, 2012
- Episodes: 8
- Video game

Petite Rock Shooter: Sexy Wakusei no Nazo o Oe
- Developer: Imageepoch
- Genre: Shoot 'em up
- Platform: iOS
- Released: September 2012
- Anime television series

Black Rock Shooter: Dawn Fall
- Directed by: Tensho
- Produced by: Megumi Suzuki; Tomoyuki Oowada; Ryouta Hasegawa; Bungo Kondou; Akihiro Sotokawa; Kento Yoshida; Cao Cong; Yoshirou Manabe
- Written by: Makoto Fukami (Note: Series composition and screenplay); Ryō Yoshigami (Note: Series composition assistant and screenplay)
- Music by: Yasunori Nishiki; Shingo Nishimura; Ren Tsukagoshi
- Studio: TMS Entertainment (production) (Note: Under the "Unlimited Produce by TMS" brand): Bibury Animation Studios; Bibury Animation CG; (animation)
- Licensed by: Disney Platform Distribution (streaming rights)
- Original network: Tokyo MX, SUN, KBS Kyoto, TV Aichi, BS11, Animax
- Original run: April 3, 2022 – June 19, 2022
- Episodes: 12
- Video game
- Black Rock Shooter: The Game
- icon

Black Rock Shooter (ブラック★ロックシューター, Burakku Rokku Shūtā), often stylized as Black★Rock Shooter, is a Japanese media franchise based on independent character illustrations created by artist Ryohei Fuke, also known as Huke. It revolves around its eponymous character, a mysterious black haired girl with a blazing blue eye. The original illustration inspired a song of the same name by Supercell featuring the Vocaloid Hatsune Miku, which gained popularity on the Nico Nico Douga website.

A 50-minute original video animation based on the franchise was produced by Yutaka Yamamoto's studio Ordet, written by Nagaru Tanigawa and Shinobu Yoshioka, and directed by Shinobu Yoshioka. A "Pilot Edition" was released on DVD and Blu-ray Disc in September 2009, before the full version was released on DVDs bundled with select magazines from July 24, 2010, subtitled in seven languages, followed by a retail release on December 17, 2010. An eight-episode anime television series, produced by Ordet and Sanzigen, aired on Fuji TV's Noitamina programming block between February and March 2012. A new anime television series titled Black Rock Shooter: Dawn Fall ran for 12 episodes aired from April to June 2022.

The franchise has also spawned several manga series and a video game for the PlayStation Portable titled Black Rock Shooter: The Game, each set in their own universe.

== Plot ==
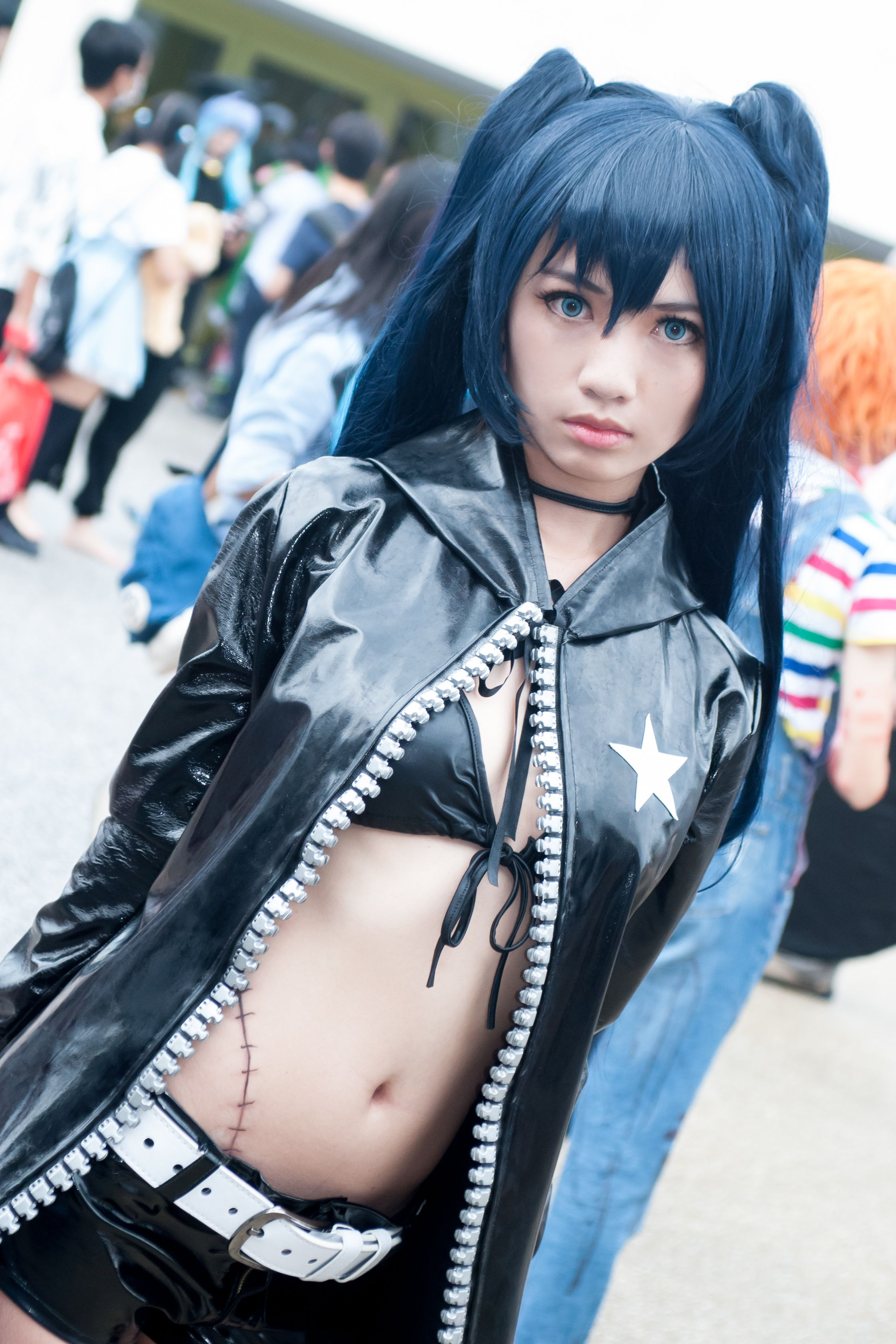
Cosplay of Black Rock Shooter at Fancy Frontier 28

While each piece of media takes place in its own universe, they each focus around Black Rock Shooter, a mysterious black haired girl who possesses a burning blue eye and a powerful cannon that can shoot rapid shots at high speed. Other characters also appear in more than one form of media.

The OVA focuses on a girl named Mato Kuroi, who befriends another girl, Yomi Takanashi, upon entering school. As the two start to drift apart, with Yomi becoming jealous of Mato's friendship with Yuu Kotari, Yomi suddenly disappears. As Mato searches for her, she is taken to a strange world where she meets the mysterious Black Rock Shooter, who merges with her and helps her search for Yomi, fighting off the evil Dead Master who possessed her. The first television series uses the same characters from the OVA in a similar but slightly different storyline. As Mato enters middle school and becomes friends with Yomi, she soon faces personal troubles and the influence caused by another world where Black Rock Shooter fights other girls.

The manga series, Black Rock Shooter: Innocent Soul, follows Black Rock Shooter and her serpent partner, Ron, as they venture the Hazama, a world between Heaven and Earth where stagnant souls that have had regrets become trapped. Left alone, these souls can become demons that can pull in other souls, so it is up to Rock to stop them so they may ascend to heaven. Black Rock-chan is a comedy series following the everyday life of a chibi-styled Black Rock Shooter named Rock-chan and her babysitter De-chan.

Black Rock Shooter: The Game takes place in the year 2051, where Black Rock Shooter, also known as Stella, is awoken from slumber and enters a futuristic battlefield where alien forces have invaded the Earth and have been terrorizing the planet for 19 years. She must fight off the aliens while also trying to regain her memories.

The anime Black Rock Shooter: Dawn Fall follows a plot similar to the game. Black Rock Shooter, also known as Empress, awakens from slumber in 2062 and learns an AI called Artemis rebelled against humanity and terrorized the planet with an army of machines. She must fend off the machines while also trying to regain her memories and fend off attacks from her former comrades, Strength and Dead Master.

== Production ==
=== Background ===
==== Original work and Supercell song ====
The origins of Black Rock Shooter date back to an original character illustration titled "Black Rock Shooter" by illustrator Ryohei Fuke, best known by his handle 'Huke', who posted it on his blog and the online artist community Pixiv on December 26, 2007. Ryo of Supercell was inspired by the illustration and created the song "Black Rock Shooter" based on that character using vocals from the Vocaloid singing synthesizer Hatsune Miku. Huke joined Supercell and provided the illustrations used in the music video of the song, which was later posted online on the video sharing website Nico Nico Douga on June 13, 2008, which as of August 2009 had over 2.2 million views. The song was later used as the opening theme for the 2012 anime television series. The song has also been included in Hatsune Miku: Project DIVA F as a playable song.

==== OVA and pilot ====
Produced by Yutaka Yamamoto's studio Ordet and directed by Shinobu Yoshioka, an original video animation (OVA) project based on "Black Rock Shooter" and its music video was announced on August 22, 2009. The screenplay was written by Nagaru Tanigawa and Shinobu Yoshioka, and character design was done by Yuusuke Matsuo. The music was composed by Ryo and the ending theme song is "Braveheart" performed by The Gomband.

A "Pilot Edition" of the anime was released on DVD and Blu-ray Disc (BD) on September 30, 2009, by Good Smile Company. The pilot contains three short animated videos showing the same scenes from the anime while playing different versions of the song "Black Rock Shooter", much like in anime music videos. The first video uses the instrumental track from the original version of "Black Rock Shooter", the second video uses the "2M Mix" remix of the song with vocals using Hatsune Miku Append, and the third video uses the instrumental version of the "2M Mix". The DVD/BD also came bundled with an image booklet and a CD containing the vocal and instrumental versions of the "2M Mix".

The full 50-minute version of Black Rock Shooter is subtitled in seven languages, and was released as a free DVD bundled with Hobby Japan magazine on July 24, 2010. The OVA also came with Gakken's Megami Magazine on July 30, 2010, Animedia magazine on August 10, 2010, and is also packaged with Figma and Nendoroid Black Rock Shooter figurines. A retail version was released on December 17, 2010, in special (BD+DVD) and regular (BD) editions. Both editions feature a 30-second test short stop motion video as a bonus featuring a remix of "Black Rock Shooter" by Joe Hahn, the DJ of Linkin Park, as well as its making-of video.

=== Anime adaptations ===
==== Black Rock Shooter ====
An eight-episode anime television series of Black Rock Shooter was produced by Ordet with CG production by Sanzigen, and was directed by Shinobu Yoshioka, with the script written by Mari Okada, animation direction and character design by Yusuke Yoshigaki and CG battle direction by Hiroyuki Imaishi. Fuji TV, Good Smile Company, Toho, Mages, Aniplex, Dentsu and Ultra Super Pictures were involved in the production. The opening theme is "Black Rock Shooter" (ブラック★ロックシューダー, Burakku Rokku Shūtā) by Supercell, sung by Hatsune Miku, while the ending theme music is "Bokura no Ashiato" (僕らのあしあと, Our Footsteps) by Supercell sung by Koeda.

==== Dawn Fall ====
On September 16, 2021, a new anime television series titled Black Rock Shooter: Dawn Fall was announced. It is produced by TMS Entertainment under its UNLIMITED PRODUCE by TMS label, animated by Bibury Animation Studios and Bibury Animation CG and directed by Tensho, with scripts written by Makoto Fukami in cooperation with Ryō Yoshigami. Character designs are provided by Masayuki Nonaka and Yō Nakagawa, both of whom also serving as chief animation directors. Disney licensed the anime as one of its first in a move to release more Asian-produced content on its streaming platform Disney+. The opening theme is "Aseed" by Zaq, while the ending theme is "Before the Nightmare" by Kanako Takatsuki.

== Release ==
Black Rock Shooter aired on Fuji TV's noitamina slot between February 2 and March 22, 2012, and was being streamed in eight languages a day after its initial broadcast. The series was released on DVD and BD on June 22, 2012, in a box set containing the original soundtrack and an Insane Black Rock Shooter Figma figurine. The television series is licensed in Australia and New Zealand by Siren Visual. Manga Entertainment released the series in the United Kingdom as a subtitle-only DVD boxset on May 13, 2013. Discotek Media licensed the anime in North America and released it with an English dub on July 27, 2021.

Black Rock Shooter: Dawn Fall aired from April 3 to June 19, 2022, on Tokyo MX and other networks. The international release dates on Disney+ vary between regions, beginning from April 30, 2022, in Indonesia, Malaysia, and Thailand; May 25, 2022, in Australia, Hong Kong, New Zealand, Taiwan, and Singapore. On October 18, 2022, the series was released on Hulu in America and Disney+ in Canada.

=== Reception ===
Black Rock Shooter—the first season—was awarded for technical achievement in broadcast animation at the 65th Motion Picture and Television Engineering Society of Japan Awards in 2012.

== Spin-off media ==
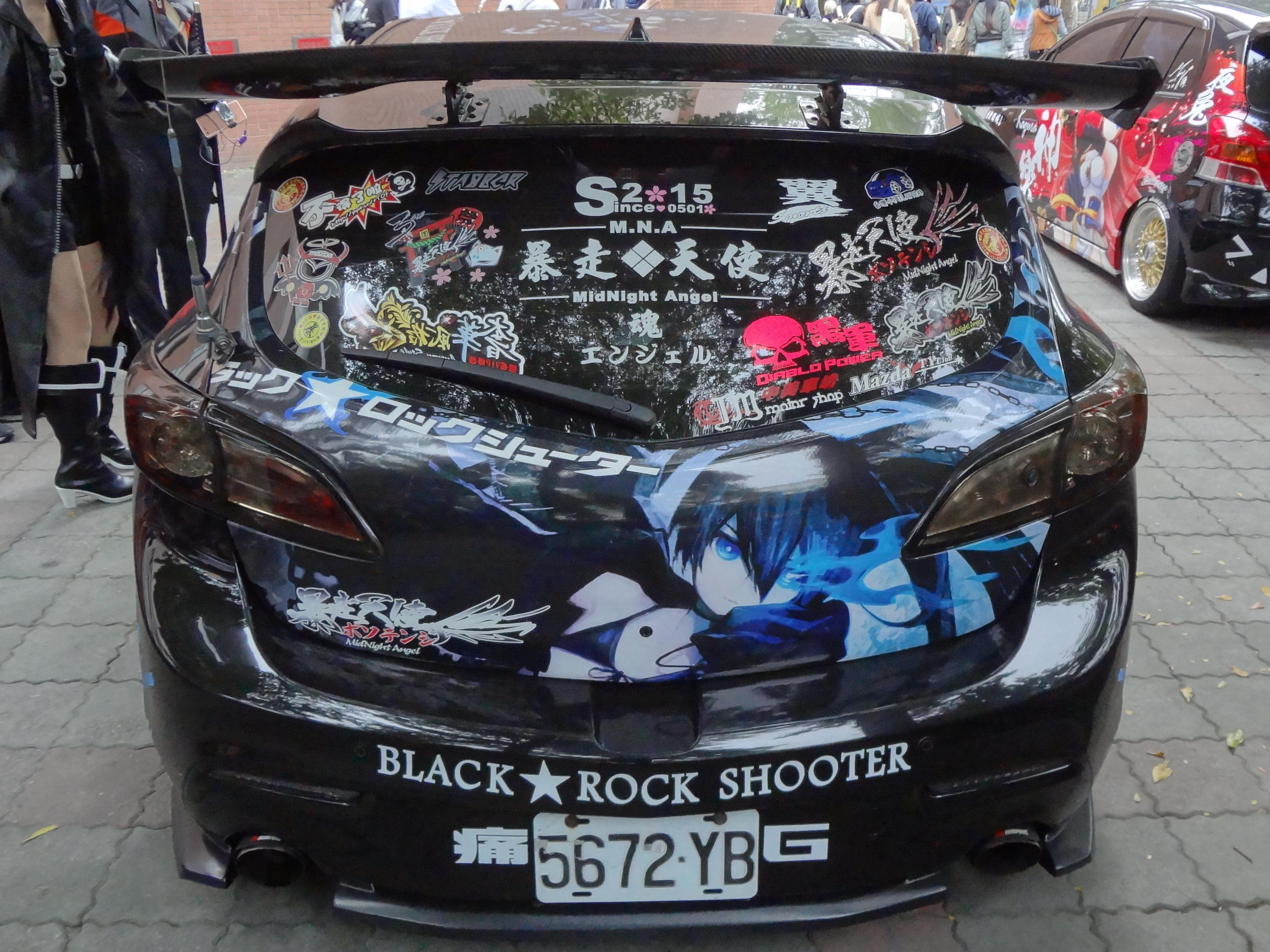
The titular character of the series on an itasha in 2018

=== Video games ===
A role-playing video game, titled Black Rock Shooter: The Game (ブラック★ロックシューター THE GAME), was developed by Imageepoch for the PlayStation Portable and was released on August 25, 2011. Set in a different universe to the OVA, it features animated cut scenes by Ufotable. The opening theme for the game is "No Scared" by One Ok Rock. A limited edition Premium Box of the game was released, bundled with a Figma figurine of the game's antagonist, White Rock Shooter. The game was published digitally by NIS America via the PlayStation Store in North America on April 23, 2013, and in Europe on April 24, 2013.

A browser game titled Petite Rock Shooter (ぷちっと★ロックシューター, Puchitto Rokku Shūtā) was released on Nico Nico Douga on March 9, 2011, featuring illustrations by CHAN×CO. Imageepooch are developing an iOS follow-up titled Petite Rock Shooter: Pursue the Mystery of the Sexy Planet! (ぷちっと★ロックシューター セクシー惑星の謎を追え！, Puchitto Rokku Shūtā: Sekushī Wakusei no Nazo o Oe) for release in September 2012. Various Black Rock Shooter elements have been made available for the Japanese PlayStation Home. Characters from Black Rock Shooter also appear in the PSP game Nendoroid Generation, produced by Namco Bandai, Good Smile Company and Banpresto, based on the Nendoroid series of figures. The game was released on February 23, 2012.

On September 27, 2024, Black Rock Shooter was added as playable character in the action RPG game Punishing: Gray Raven.

=== Manga ===
A four-panel comic strip manga titled Black Rock-chan (ぶらっくろっくちゃん, Burakku Rokku-chan), illustrated by Ringo, was serialized in Kadokawa Shoten's 4-Koma Nano Ace magazine from the April 2011 and March 2012 issues. The series features super-deformed versions of Black Rock Shooter and Dead Master, respectively, named Rock-chan and De-chan. A single tankōbon volume of Black Rock-chan was released on February 4, 2012. Another manga by Sanami Suzuki, titled Black Rock Shooter: Innocent Soul (ブラック★ロックシューター -イノセントソウル-, Burakku Rokku Shūtā: Inosento Souru), was serialized in Kadokawa Shoten's Young Ace magazine from the July 2011 and June 2012 issues. Three volumes were published for Innocent Soul from November 4, 2011, and June 4, 2012. A manga adaptation of Black Rock Shooter: The Game illustrated by TNSK was serialized from September 2011 and September 2012 issues of Kadokawa Shoten's Comptiq. The first volume of The Game was released on February 10, 2012, and the second and last on September 26, 2012.
