= Black Rock Shooter: The Game =

2011 video game

- Japanese box art featuring White Rock Shooter, Black Rock Shooter and Nana Gray
- Developer: Imageepoch
- Publishers: JP: Imageepoch; WW: NIS America
- Writer: Kazushige Nojima
- Composer: Manabu Namiki
- Series: Black Rock Shooter
- Platform: PlayStation Portable
- Release: JP: August 25, 2011; US: April 23, 2013; EU: April 25, 2013
- Genre: Action RPG
- Mode: Single-player

Black Rock Shooter: The Game (ブラック★ロックシューター THE GAME, Burakku ★ Rokku Shūtā Za Gēmu) is an action role-playing game developed by Imageepoch for the PlayStation Portable. It is based on the Black Rock Shooter franchise created by Huke. The game was released in Japan on August 25, 2011. NIS America published the game digitally on the PlayStation Store in the United States and Europe in April 2013, respectively.

== Gameplay ==
Black Rock Shooter: The Game is an action RPG in which players take on the role of the eponymous Black Rock Shooter (BRS for short). The game is divided up into several missions in which the player must clear objectives to progress.

On the main overworld, BRS can explore the available areas and look for certain items. Battle begins when the player comes into contact with an enemy on the overworld.

During battle, BRS can aim and shoot with her rock cannon at enemies, block against attacks and sidestep to avoid them completely. If the player fires the rock cannon or uses the sidestep too much in a short time, the system will overheat, leaving the player vulnerable to attack until it cools down.

Throughout the game, players can earn abilities that can be equipped to BRS and used in battle, each with their own cooldown periods. These include offensive attacks such as a powerful blast, a sniper rifle, or support abilities that can increase BRS's stats such as her attack or defense. Certain sections will also see BRS ride a motorcycle, in which she can attack enemies on either side of her or use weapons to fire in front of enemies.

== Plot ==
In the year 2032, Earth suddenly comes under attack from a group of aliens, turning the planet into a warzone. Nineteen years later in 2051, the last twelve humans alive awaken Black Rock Shooter to help battle against the aliens. However, there is more to BRS' existence than being a mere weapon.

== Development and release ==
Black Rock Shooter: The Game was first announced on August 15, 2010 and was released on August 25, 2011. It features animated cut scenes by Ufotable. The game's opening theme is "No Scared" by One Ok Rock.

A limited edition Premium Box of the game was released in Japan, bundled with a Figma figurine of the game's antagonist, White Rock Shooter. The game was published in the United States and Europe by NIS America in April 2013 respectively via the PlayStation Store. The game is not available in Canada, Mexico and other European countries for legal reasons.

A manga adaptation of the game illustrated by TNSK was serialized between September 2011 and September 2012 issues of Kadokawa Shoten's Comptiq. The first volume of The Game was published on February 10, 2012, with the second volume released on September 26, 2012.

== Reception ==
Reception

Aggregate score
Aggregator	Score
Metacritic	66/100

Review scores
Publication	Score
Famitsu	33/40
Game Informer	7.25/10
Hardcore Gamer	3/5
PlayStation Official Magazine – UK	4/10
Pocket Gamer	3/5
RPGamer	2/5
RPGFan	67%
The Digital Fix	5/10

Black Rock Shooter: The Game received "average" reviews according to the review aggregation website Metacritic. In Japan, Famitsu gave it scores of one nine and three eights for a total of 33 out of 40.
