= Mount Ōno =

Mountain in Japan

- 大野山
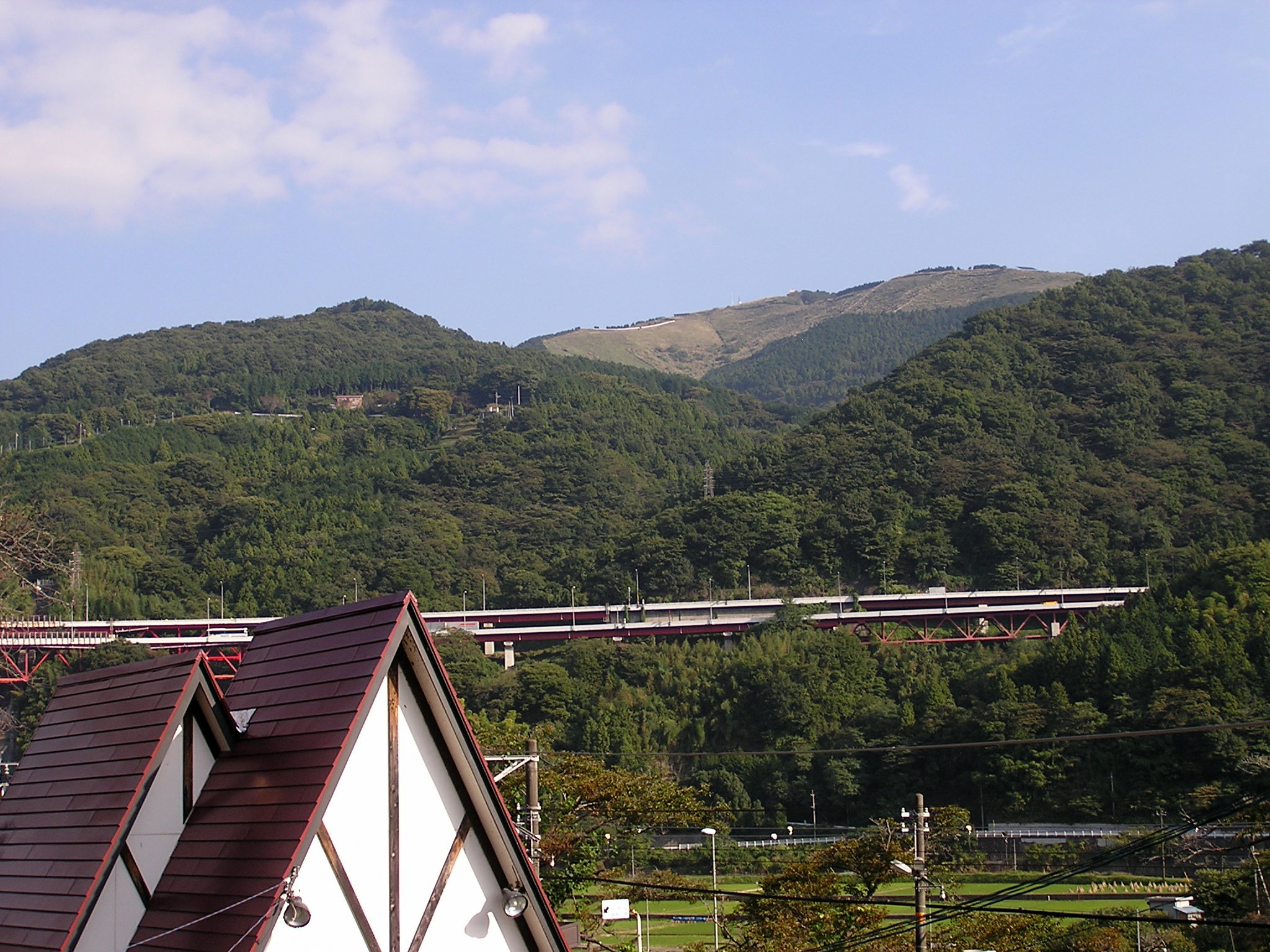

Highest point
- Elevation: 723.1 m (2,372 ft)
- Coordinates: 35°23′10″N 139°2′56″E

Geography
- Location: Yamakita, Kanagawa, Japan
- Parent range: Tanzawa Mountains

Mount Ōno (大野山, Ōnoyama) is a mountain located in Yamakita, Kanagawa.

It belongs to Tanzawa-Ōyama Quasi-National Park. The area around the mountaintop had been used as a Kanagawa Prefectural Onoyama dairy cow breeding ranch (completed in 1968), but it was abolished as a prefectural ranch on March 31, 2016.

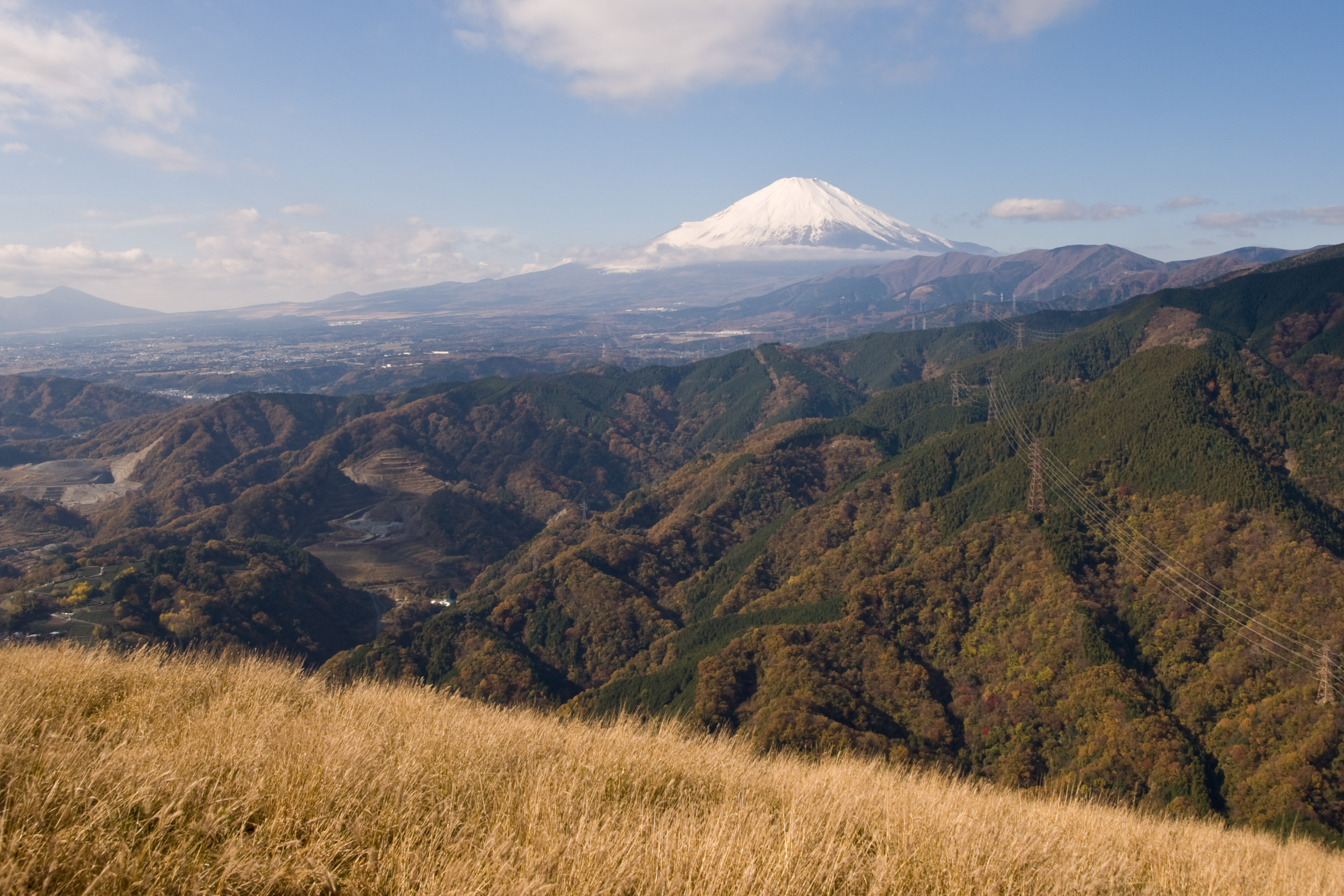
Mt. Fuji from Mt. Ono
