= Nendoroid =

Line of plastic figures

Nendoroid series
- Logo
- Introduced: February 2006
- Produced by: Good Smile Company
- Distributed by: Good Smile Company
- Series creator: Tsuyoshi Oda (Oda-P)
- Specifications: Painted ABS&PVC non-scale articulated figures. Approximately 100mm in height.

The Nendoroid (ねんどろいど, Nendoroido) series is a brand of plastic figures created by the Japanese Good Smile Company since 2006. They typically depict characters from anime, manga or video games and are designed with a large head and smaller body to give them a cute appearance. Their faces and other body parts are exchangeable, giving them a range of different expressions and poses. The Nendoroid brand spans a variety of different products: the original 10 cm figures, smaller Nendoroid Petite figures, additional display tools known as the Nendoroid More series as well as plushies and play sets. Several video games have also been released based on Nendoroid designs.

== History and reception ==
The first character to be sold as a Nendoroid was Nendoroid Neco Arc from the Tsukihime game, which was released at Wonder Festival 2006. The original creator of the series was Tsuyoshi Oda (also known as Oda-P), however the series is now worked on by a number of people who work under the collective name Nendoron. The name Nendoroid originated from this alias, although it may also be partially derived from the Japanese word for clay, nendo (粘土), because the prototypes for each figure are sometimes made of synthetic plastics and other soft materials similar to clay. The reason for this collective name was that too many people worked simultaneously on a single Nendoroid, making it difficult to credit them all. The planning and production of a single figure is done by over ten people on the Good Smile Company team.

By March 2009, the Nendoroid series had sold over 1 million units and the Nendoroid Petite series had sold over 3 million units. The series expanded quickly, and by July 2010 there were over 100 different Nendoroids. In May 2013, Good Smile Company released its 300th product in the base series, Hatsune Miku 2.0, which was an advanced version of the previous best-selling Nendoroid Hatsune Miku. The box design and method of connecting face plates was also improved from this release onward.

== Products ==
Nendoroid figure of Haruhi Suzumiya with interchangeable body parts and facial expressions

The Nendoroid (ねんどろいど) series of figures are made from ABS and PVC. They are designed in a chibi style, also known as "super deformed", with a large head and smaller body to give them a cute appearance. The figures are used as both collector's items and toys. Their faces and other body parts are exchangeable, giving them a range of different possible expressions and poses. More than 5000 face plates are available. Nendoroid figures have mostly been based on female characters from anime, manga or video games series such as Puella Magi Madoka Magica, Magical Girl Lyrical Nanoha, Steins;Gate, K-ON!, Haruhi Suzumiya, Cardcaptor Sakura, Fate/stay night, Vocaloid, etc. However, in recent years, the line has begun including characters from various Disney properties, as well as the Star Wars franchise and American superhero movies like Iron Man 3, Wonder Woman, Thor: Ragnarok, Justice League, Black Panther and Avengers: Infinity War. In 2021, a Nendoroid of Thomas the Tank Engine was produced for the franchise's 75th anniversary. As of July 2022, more than 21 million Nendoroids have been shipped around the globe.

Nendoroid (ねんどろいど) is the primary series where each figure is approximately 10 cm in height and includes a special Nendoroid stand to display the figure. Most also come with alternate arms and legs allowing for different poses, and expression parts that can be swapped out to display a different emotion. The legs, arms and neck are all articulated allowing some degree of movement. Certain Nendoroid figures known as the Edition series have additional articulated joints. Nendoroids often also include optional parts such as weapons, items, or other key elements from the series they come from. The expressions and other parts can also be swapped between Nendoroids, allowing collectors to mix and match parts from different characters. Nendoroids have no set price, but as of 2022 the average is between 4000 and 8000 Japanese yen. While most official Nendoroids are released by Good Smile Company, there are certain characters that are released by FREEing, Phat! Company and other companies. They are however always distributed by Good Smile Company.

The Nendoroid Petite (ねんどろいどぷち) series is very similar to the primary series, but the figures are roughly half the size at approximately 6.5 cm each. They also include a small stand to display the figure. Nendoroid Petites are sold either as complete sets or in blind boxes that have a single random character. Like their larger counterparts, the facial expressions and other optional parts can be swapped between other Nendoroid Petite characters. As of 2013, singles sell for 600 Japanese yen, while the larger sets differ depending on the number of characters in the set.

The Nendoroid More (ねんどろいどもあ) series was designed as a project by the new university graduates that joined Good Smile Company in 2012. The idea behind the series was to create an easier and more enjoyable way to display Nendoroid figures. The series includes clips and suction cup stands that can each hold a single Nendoroid figure, as well as decorative parts that can be attached to figures and stands.

The Nendoroid Playsets (ねんどろいどプレイセット) are small dioramic rooms that are designed as a display area for Nendoroids. They are produced and manufactured by Phat! Company.

The Nendoroid Plus (ねんどろいどプラス) series refers to other goods that are based on the Nendoroid designs, however are not actually ABS&PVC figures. These include rubber straps, plushies and charms. They are often released by companies other than Good Smile Company.

Nendoroid Surprise (ねんどろいどさぷらいず) is a line of collectible figures within the Nendoroid series, featuring blind capsule packaging. Each capsule contains one Nendoroid Surprise figure, which stands at approximately 7 cm in height, slightly smaller than standard Nendoroid figures.

Nendoroid Basic (ねんどろいど べーしっく) is a simplified line within the Nendoroid series. Unlike standard Nendoroids, these figures do not include interchangeable face plates or additional parts, a design choice that reduces production costs and shortens manufacturing times. Basic figures can still be customized with accessories from other Nendoroid models.

== Video games ==
An RPG based on Nendoroid figure series titled Nendoroid Generation (ねんどろいど じぇねれ～しょん, Nendoroido Jenerēshon), was developed by Bandai Namco Games, Good Smile Company and Banpresto for PlayStation Portable. The game features Nendoroid versions of characters from Steins;Gate, Black Rock Shooter, Haruhi Suzumiya, Magical Girl Lyrical Nanoha, Zero no Tsukaima, Dog Days, Fate/stay night, and Touhou Project, as well as Good Smile Company's mascot character, Gumako. The game was released in Japan on February 23, 2012.

Hatsune Miku and Future Stars: Project Mirai is a music game for the Nintendo 3DS released on March 8, 2012. The game features the Vocaloid character, Hatsune Miku, with her appearance based on the Nendoroid design. A sequel to the game titled Hatsune Miku: Project Mirai 2 was released on November 28, 2013. The upcoming game Hatsune Miku: Starry Party also features Nendoroid designs for Vocaloid characters.
