= Jigokuraku: Paradise Battle =

2025 role-playing video game

- Developer: Good Smile Company
- Writer: Akira Kindaichi
- Composer: Yoshiaki Dewa
- Series: Hell's Paradise: Jigokuraku
- Platforms: Windows; iOS; Android
- Release: November 4, 2025
- Genres: Role-playing, survival
- Mode: Multiplayer

Jigokuraku: Paradise Battle (Note: Japanese: 地獄楽 パラダイスバトル, Hepburn: Jigokuraku Paradaisu Batoru) is a 2025 free-to-play role-playing survival video game developed and published by the Japanese figurine company Good Smile Company. It was originally released for Windows and mobile devices in Japan in November 2025. The game is based on the 2023 anime television series adaptation of Yuji Kaku's manga series, Hell's Paradise: Jigokuraku. It is also expected to release on Steam in July 2026.

The game features an anime-style open-world environment and a turn-based battle system that utilises character-switching. Staff from the Hell's Paradise anime television series helped with the game, including Yoshiaki Dewa composing the music and Akira Kindaichi supervising the scenario. Partially due to the popularity of Hell's Paradise, the game was widely anticipated before its launch. It would be received generally positively by critics.

== Gameplay ==
Jigokuraku: Paradise Battle is a free-to-play survival role-playing game that utilises a turn-based battle system. Players explore an anime-style open-world version of the mystical Shinsenkyō island, forming teams of "Condemned Sentries" and "Executioners" to fight bizarre creatures and immortal beings. The gameplay centers on turn-based, character-switching action, featuring voiced stories tied to a "Bond Rank" system and gacha mechanics for unlocking new characters. The story follows the anime's narrative, guiding characters like Gabimaru and Sagiri in their quest to locate the Elixir of Life. The game includes daily login bonuses, players are able to receive gacha tickets.

== Plot ==
Based on the anime series, the game is set in the Edo period, and follows the shinobi Gabimaru the Hollow and his assigned executioner, Yamada Asaemon Sagiri, as they explore the mystical island Shinsenkyō to find the Elixir of Life in exchange for a full pardon.

== Development ==
Development for the game was announced in 2024. Good Smile Company would start working on Jigokuraku: Paradise Battle with supervision by Japanese animation studio MAPPA. The scriptwriter for Hell's Paradise Akira Kindaichi would write the game's overall theme, with returning composer Yoshiaki Dewa handling composition alongside Zenta.

== Promotion and release ==
The game was announced in December 2024 at Jump Festa '25. Japanese anime production company Twin Engine would announce in September 2025 a survival role-playing game based on the Hell's Paradise: Jigokuraku manga series, would launch in early November 2025. Pre-registration was made available for the game in Japan. A trailer for the game published by Good Smile Company would be revealed. It was released by Good Smile Company worldwide for Windows, iOS and Android on November 4, 2025. The PC version on DMM Games contained cutscenes from the anime which would otherwise be classified as NSFW. During the game's pre-download period, it ranked at #1 in the App Store's free download rankings. A version of the game's english version titled Jigokuraku: Battle in Hell's Paradise was announced for an official release on Steam in July 2026.
