= Amnesia Labyrinth =

Japanese manga series

- English version of Amnesia Labyrinth as published by Seven Seas Entertainment

蜻蛉迷宮 (Kagerō Meikyū)
- Genre: Murder mystery
- Manga
- Written by: Nagaru Tanigawa
- Illustrated by: Natsumi Kohane
- Published by: ASCII Media Works
- English publisher: NA: Seven Seas Entertainment
- Magazine: Dengeki Bunko Magazine
- Original run: June 10, 2008 – December 18, 2009
- Volumes: 2

Amnesia Labyrinth (Japanese: 蜻蛉迷宮, Hepburn: Kagerō Meikyū) is a Japanese manga written by Nagaru Tanigawa and illustrated by Natsumi Kohane. It was serialized in ASCII Media Works's Dengeki Bunko Magazine beginning in June 2008. The individual chapters were collected into two tankōbon volumes, which were released on August 10, 2009, and December 18, 2009. The manga is licensed in North America by Seven Seas Entertainment, which released the two volumes on February 2, 2011, and June 7, 2011. It has also been licensed in Taiwan by Kadokawa Media.

== Plot ==
Soji Kushiki, a high school student, returns to his family's mansion after his twin brother Kazushi suddenly disappears, forcing him to take his place as heir. Although he is welcomed back by his sister-in-law Harumi, his biological sister Yoko, and his half-sister Saki, Soji feels increasingly uneasy within the oppressive and maze-like household, where their behavior toward him becomes strangely intense and unsettling.

After transferring to a new high school, Soji learns that a series of violent incidents have occurred, including a student being pushed in front of a train and others being attacked. He becomes involved in investigating the cases alongside his classmate Yukako Sasai, who suspects that the murders are connected. As Soji looks deeper into the incidents, he begins to notice disturbing coincidences between the crimes and his own return, leading him to suspect that someone within his family may be responsible.

== Reception ==
Manga Bookshelf's Katherine Dacey lists Amnesia Labyrinth as the fifth worst manga of 2011. Anime News Network's Carlo Santos commends the manga with its "deceptive leads and clues" and "calm, down-to-earth portrayal of home and school". However, he criticizes that Kohane's use of "careful shading, clean linework" serves to hide the "slightly off-kilter character designs and stiff facial expressions." A later review by Santos commends the manga for its logic puzzles and its use of "long silences, where the things unsaid between characters make it far more intriguing than any dialogue could have." With regards to the art, Santos commends Kohane for "using lots of hatched lines and ominous shading to create a different era where a supernatural back-story adds new layers to the series" but criticizes him for being inconsistent "when it comes to basic character design and anatomy".

Mania's Matthew Warner commends the manga's artwork with "the artwork provided looks fantastic, and is definitely one of the book's main draws. Character designs look solid and display emotion well (though there is one instance in which a character strips that looks a little off, for whatever reason). However, the real star is the backgrounds and environments throughout, which appear often and have something of a stylized, sketchy feel to them, and are usually quite complex." School Library Journal's Snow Wildsmith commends Kohane's sharp artwork "full of feral smiles and vulpine eyes." She recommends the manga to the fans of psychological manga such as After School Nightmare and Higurashi When They Cry. Dacey heavily pans the "source material; as writer Nagaru Tanigawa explains in the afterword to volume one, Amnesia Labyrinth was "based on a story that, while it didn't have enough to become a full-fledged novel, had been kicking around in my head for years." He admitted that he had to "dismantle" his original idea and "reinvent the characters"; small wonder that the published version was, by his own admission, filled with "lazy, phantom passages," vestiges of an earlier story idea."

== List of volumes ==
No.	Original release date	Original ISBN	English release date	English ISBN
1	10 August 2009	978-4-04-868067-7	01 February, 2011	978-1-934876-93-0
2	18 December 2009	978-4-04-868301-2	7 June 2011	978-1-934876-37-4
