= Hatsune Miku: Starry Party =

Upcoming video game

- Developers: Crypton Future Media; Good Smile Company
- Series: Hatsune Miku
- Platforms: Nintendo Switch 2; PC
- Release: 2027
- Genre: Party video game

Hatsune Miku: Starry Party is an upcoming party video game developed by Crypton Future Media and Good Smile Company. It is based on characters from the Vocaloid line of software. It is scheduled to be released on Nintendo Switch 2 and PC via Steam in 2027.

The game was first announced at the Hatsune Miku panel at the 2026 Anime Expo. It features characters from the Vocaloid line of voice synthesizer software such as Hatsune Miku, Kagamine Rin and Len, Megurine Luka, Meiko, and Kaito. The character designs in the game are based on the Nendoroid plastic figures produced by Good Smile Company. It will allow up to six players to play at once.
