= Rien (character) =

Fictional character from Hell's Paradise: Jigokuraku

- Hell's Paradise: Jigokuraku character
- Rien, as illustrated by Yuji Kaku
- First appearance: "Hell's Paradise: Jigokuraku Chapter 53 (2019)"
- Last appearance: "Hell's Paradise: Jigokuraku Chapter 121 (2020)"
- Created by: Yuji Kaku
- Voiced by: English: Michelle Rojas (Yin form) Ian Sinclair (Yang form); Japanese: Yūko Kaida (Yin form) Junichi Suwabe (Yang form)

In-universe information
- Alias: Shangdi Samantabhadra; Rien
- Race: Tensen
- Gender: Female
- Spouse: Jofuku (husband)

Shangdi Samantabhadra (Chinese: 尚迪·薩曼塔巴德拉, pinyin: Shàng dí·sà màn tǎ bā dé lā), often known as Rien (Japanese: 画眉丸), is a fictional character and the main antagonist of the manga and anime series Hell's Paradise: Jigokuraku, created by Yuji Kaku. She is the leader of Lord Tensen, a group of non-human beings that inhabit the Shinsenkyo island. Her main goal is to resurrect her dead husband. She was first introduced in the Lord Tensen story arc that covers the 3rd to 7th volumes of the manga.

== Conception and creation ==
Manga artist Yuji Kaku developed characters of Hell's Paradise with the thought of how conflicted human relationships and modern ethics would function in the setting of Japan's Edo period. Character creation for Hell's Paradise stemmed from a simple, core framework: "several pairs of people whose interests aren't aligned [are] thrown into an enclosed space and forced to work together". In an interview with Crunchyroll, Kaku stated, "Despite condemned criminals and executioners being difficult characters to empathize with, if they share our perspective, then we feel close to them." In his explanation of how he approached the character designs, Kaku wrote "Designing characters isn't unpleasant, and I try to express the character's personality through their design. Reality is different, but in manga, I think there's a firm connection between the inside and outside. [I] talked about that with Miura-sensei as well. I deliberately try give important characters strong designs."

=== Casting ===
In the Hell's Paradise anime adaptation, Rien is voiced by Yūko Kaida in Japanese in her Yin form and Junichi Suwabe in her Yang form. In English, she is voiced by Michelle Rojas in her Yin form and Ian Sinclair in her Yang form.

== Appearances ==
=== In Hell's Paradise ===
Rien made her appearance as a woman with short purple hair, a purple haori and purple-colored iris. She is often considered the leader of the Lord Tensen. She possesses pyrokinesis and the ability to revive corpses.

During her time as a young woman, she had purple hair arriving at her chin that hide her left side. She was seen wearing a white haori. It was then revealed that her current appearance is actually a puppet that she is able to control from her original body that is her original appearance centuries ago. She is also able shapeshift into different forms.

Rien makes an appearance in "Immutability and Change", the third episode of the second season of Hell's Paradise, in a battle with Aza Chōbei.
