= Takanori Aki =

Japanese corporate executive

- 安藝貴範
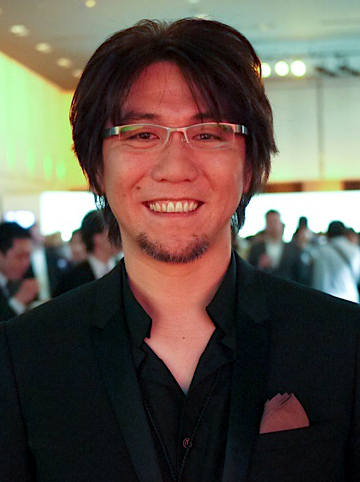
- 2 May 2011
- Born: January 26, 1971 (age 55); Sanuki, Kagawa Prefecture, Japan
- Other name: Aki-san
- Occupation: President of Good Smile Company

Takanori Aki (安藝 貴範, Aki Takanori; born 26 January 1971), also known as 'Aki-san', is the president and CEO of Good Smile Company. He was born in Sanuki, Kagawa Prefecture, Japan.

As the CEO of Good Smile Company he works to provide new content to fans of character figures and goods. He has also been involved in the production and planning of a number of anime series and films, which has led him to become one of the founding board members of the Ultra Super Pictures animation studio.

== Career ==
Takanori Aki was first employed at Konami, then worked in marketing at Banpresto before deciding to create his own company. In May 2001 he established Good Smile Company as a talent agency, which later became involved in the production and distribution of sculpted products with its sister company Max Factory, after meeting with MAX Watanabe. At that time the company was not going well as a talent agency, and thus soon moved entirely into making and distributing figures instead, which is now the main focus of his company, even though he admits to never having sculpted anything himself. He also created Good Smile Racing, a division of the main company created from his passion for fast cars, which supports racing teams and produces car accessories. Takanori has been to international events around the world as a guest speaker for the industry, including Anime Expo, and Anime Festival Asia.

== Anime production and planning ==
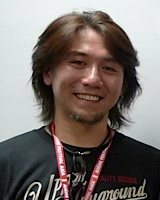
Aki in 14 November 2010

Aki is known for his work involving the Black Rock Shooter project, a project that expanded an illustration by huke into a series of figures as well as an animated series. He has also been credited in a number of other anime series for planning and production. Below is a list of series he has been involved in;

- Aiura: Planning
- Berserk: The Golden Age Arc I - The Egg of the King (movie): Executive Producer
- Black Rock Shooter (OAV): Producer, Production Direction
- Black Rock Shooter (TV): Executive Producer
- CANAAN: Executive Producer
- Croisée in a Foreign Labyrinth - The Animation: Planning
- D.C.III ~Da Capo III~: Executive Producer
- Dog Days: Executive Producer
- Dog Days': Executive Producer
- Gargantia on the Verdurous Planet: Planning
- Haganai: Planning
- Haganai NEXT: Planning
- Hanasaku Iroha - Blossoms for Tomorrow: Executive Producer
- Kimi ga Aruji de Shitsuji ga Ore de: Planning
- The Legend of Heroes: Trails in the Sky (Special): Executive Producer
- Senki Zesshō Symphogear: Executive Producer
- Senyuu.: Executive Producer (Good Smile)
- Tantei Opera Milky Holmes: Executive Producer
- Tari Tari: Executive Producer
- Tears to Tiara: Executive Producer

In 2012, Aki was one of the founding members of the holding company, Ultra Super Pictures. The company is an animation studio incorporating four smaller studios: Sanzigen, Ordet Films, Liden Films and TRIGGER. The companies providing capital for the company were Aki's Good Smile Company, its sister company Max Factory, Bushiroad, Nitroplus, and Pixiv.
