= Yamakita =

Yamakita 山北町
- Town
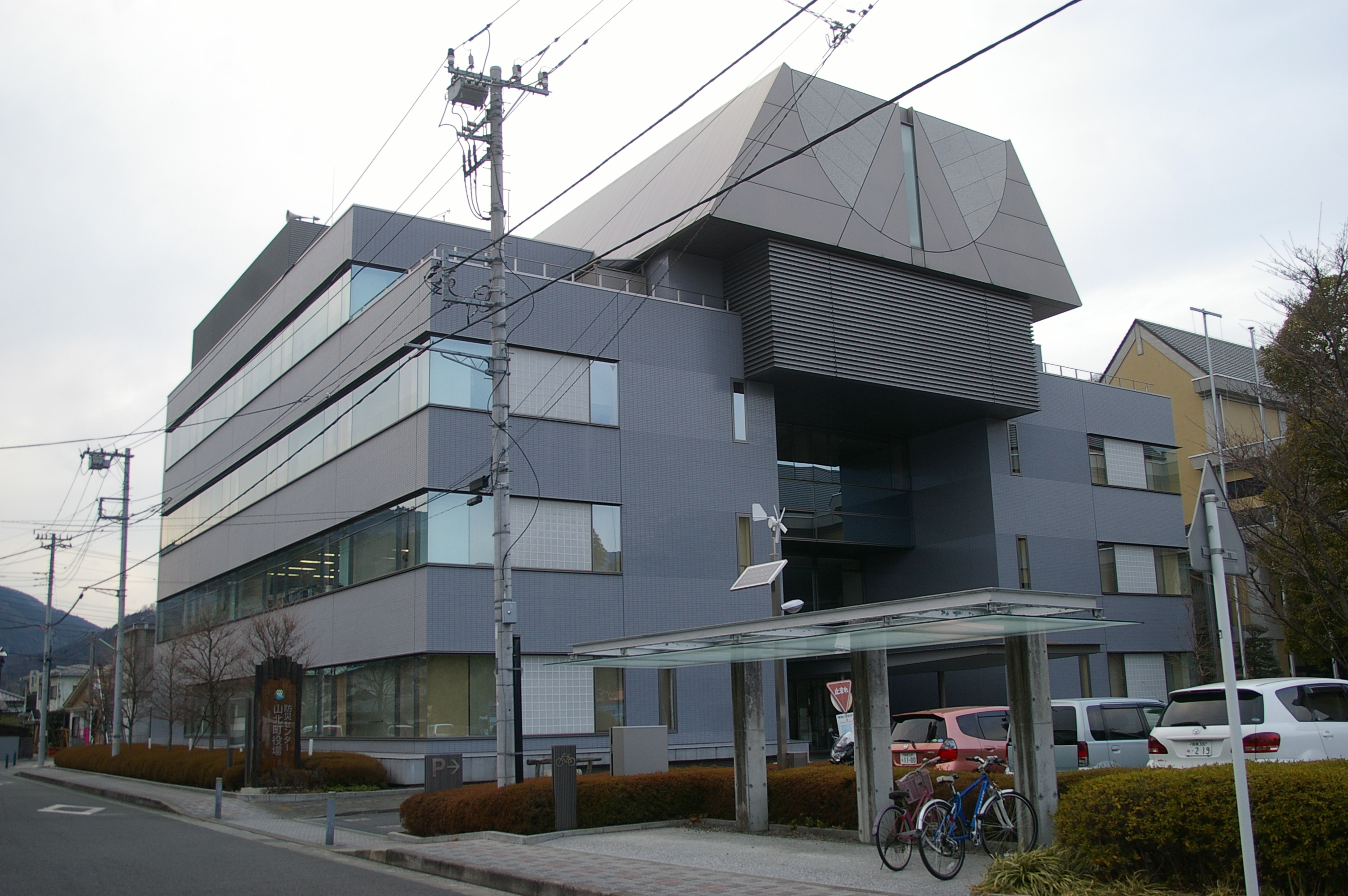
- Yamakita Town Hall

- Flag Seal

- Location of Yamakita in Kanagawa Prefecture

- Coordinates: 35°21′N 139°4′E
- Country: Japan
- Region: Kantō
- Prefecture: Kanagawa
- District: Ashigarakami

Area
  - Total: 224.70 km^{2} (86.76 sq mi)

Population (May 1, 2021)
  - Total: 9,878
  - Density: 43.96/km^{2} (113.9/sq mi)
- Time zone: UTC+9 (Japan Standard Time)
- City symbols
  - Tree: Japanese beech
  - Flower: Kerria
  - Bird: Copper pheasant
- Phone number: 046-75-1122
- Address: 1301-4 Yamakita, Yamakita-machi, Ashigarakami-gun, Kanagawa-ken 258-0195
- Website: Official website

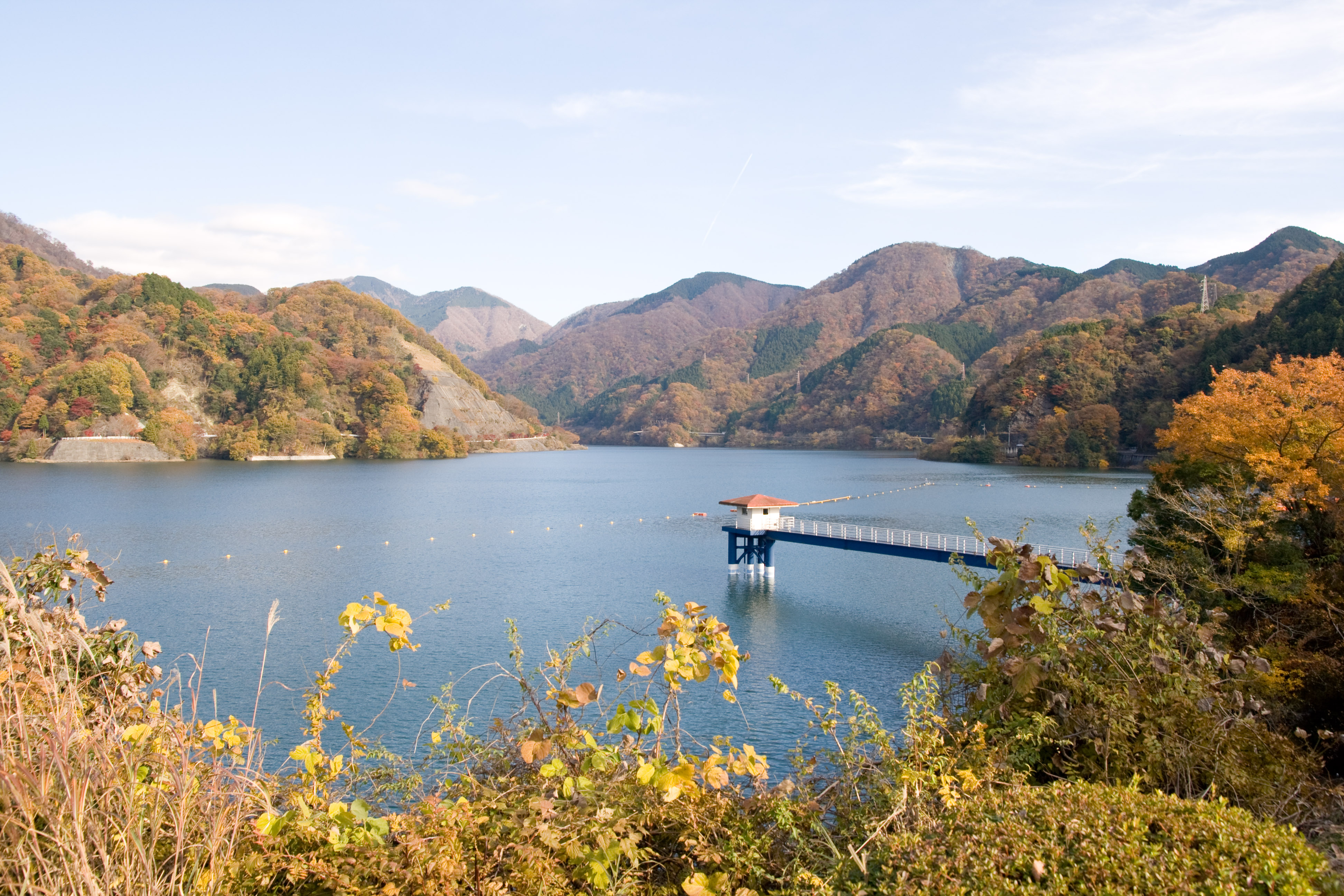
Lake Tanzawa

Yamakita (山北町, Yamakita-machi) is a town located in Kanagawa Prefecture, Japan. As of 1 October 2023, the town had an estimated population of 9,468 and a population density of 42,1 persons per km². The total area of the town is 224.70 square kilometres (86.76 sq mi).

== Geography ==
Yamakita is located in the mountainous western portion of Kanagawa Prefecture, bordering Shizuoka and Yamanashi Prefectures. Much of the town is within the boundaries of the Tanzawa-Ōyama Quasi-National Park. Yamakita is approximately 50 kilometers west of Yokohama. Lake Tanzawa is located in the center of the town.

=== Surrounding municipalities ===
Kanagawa Prefecture

- Hadano
- Kaisei
- Kiyokawa
- Matsuda
- Minamiashigara
- Nakai
- Sagamihara

Shizuoka Prefecture

- Oyama

Yamanashi Prefecture

- Dōshi, Yamanakako

=== Climate ===
Yamakita has a humid subtropical climate (Köppen Cfa) characterized by warm summers and cool winters with light to no snowfall. The average annual temperature in Yamakita is 11.6 °C. The average annual rainfall is 2042 mm with September as the wettest month. The temperatures are highest on average in August, at around 22.8 °C, and lowest in January, at around 0.4 °C.

== Demographics ==
Per Japanese census data, the population of Yamakita has declined since the postwar period.

Historical population
Year	Pop.	±%
1950	16,710	—
1960	15,839	−5.2%
1970	14,235	−10.1%
1980	13,803	−3.0%
1990	14,342	+3.9%
2000	13,605	−5.1%
2010	11,764	−13.5%
2020	9,791	−16.8%

== History ==
During the Edo period the area around Yamakita was part of Odawara Domain, along with most of western Sagami Province. After the cadastral reforms of the early Meiji period, Kawa village was one of several villages established within Ashigarakami district, Kanagawa Prefecture on April 1, 1889 with the creation of the modern municipalities system. In the Meiji era, the town prospered as a transportation hub with the opening of the Tokaido Main Line railway, but when the line changed its route due to the opening of the Tanna Tunnel, its role rapidly declined. Kawa village was elevated to town status on April 1, 1933 and renamed Yamakita. It merged with neighboring Kyowa, Shimizu and Miho villages on February 1, 1955 and further expanded by annexing the Hirayama area of former Kitaashigara village on April 1, 1955.

== Government ==
Yamakita has a mayor-council form of government with a directly elected mayor and a unicameral town council of 14 members. Yamakita, together with the other municipalities in Ashigarakami District and Minamiashigara city, collectively contributes one member to the Kanagawa Prefectural Assembly. In terms of national politics, the town is part of Kanagawa 17th district of the lower house of the Diet of Japan.

== Economy ==
The economy of Yamakita is based primarily on agriculture and forestry.

== Education ==
Yamakita has two public elementary schools and two public middle schools operated by the town government. The town has one public high school operated by the Kanagawa Prefectural Board of Education, and there is one private high school.

== Transportation ==
=== Railway ===
JR Tokai – Gotemba Line

- Higashi-Yamakita - Yamakita - Yaga

=== Highway ===
- Tōmei Expressway (Ōi-Matsuda interchange)
- National Route 246

== Local attractions ==
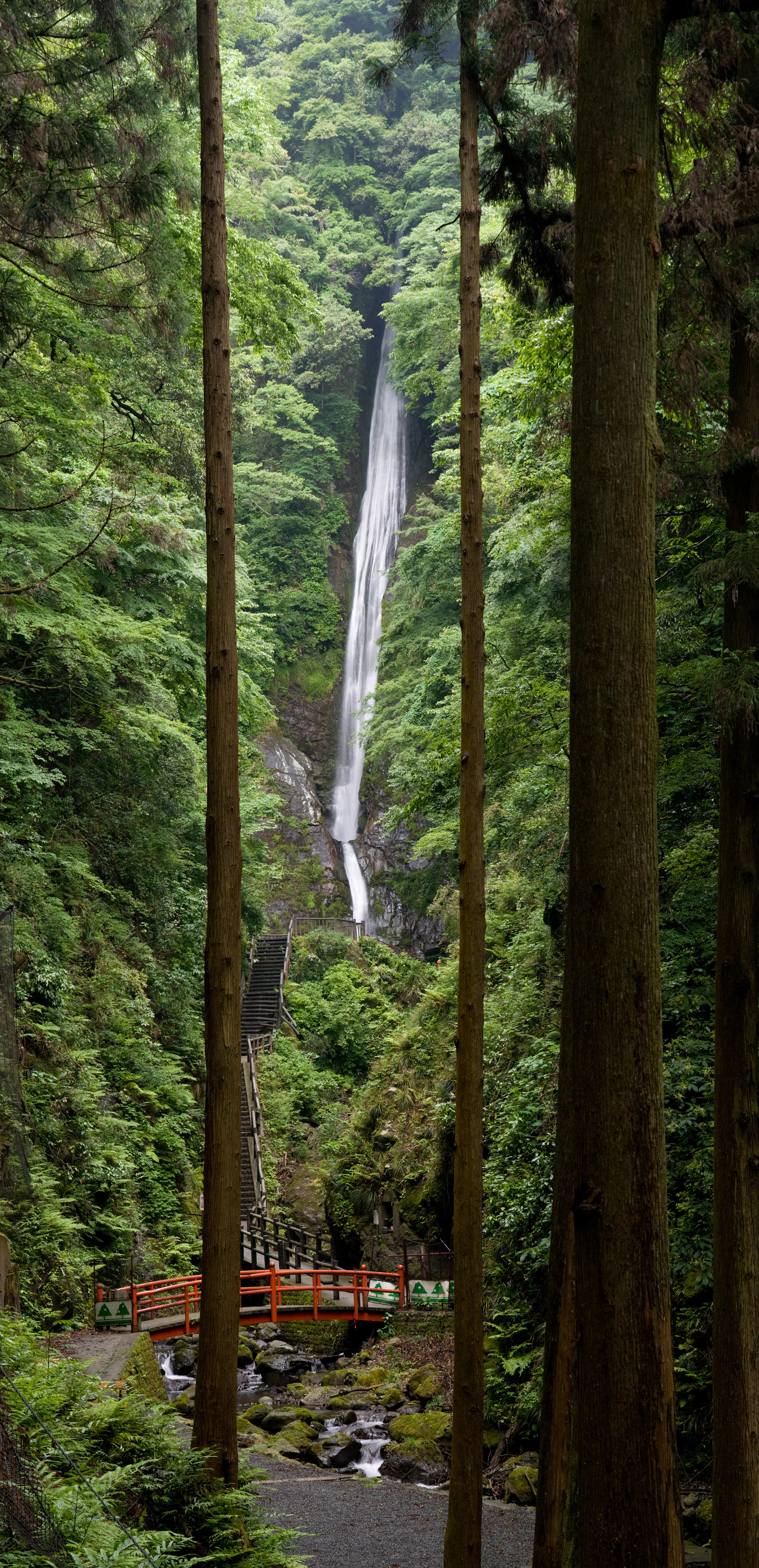
Shasui Waterfalls

- Mount Ōno
- Nakagawa Cedar
- Shasui Falls

=== Hot springs ===
- Nakagawa Hot Springs

=== Camping areas ===
- Lake Tanzawa Campsite
- Lake Tanzawa Lodge
- West Tanzawa Cottage Camp Ground
- West Tanzawa Nakagawa Lodge
- Yamakita Town Friendship Village

=== Parks ===
- Kawamura Castle ruins Historical Park
- Yamakita Railway Park

=== Festivals ===
- Lake Tanzawa Fireworks Festival
- West Tanzawa Autumn Momiji Festival
- Yamakita Cherry Blossom Festival (end of March ~ beginning of April)

=== Events ===
- Christmas in Lake Tanzawa
- Lake Tanzawa Canoe Marathon
- Lake Tanzawa Fishing Festival
- Lake Tanzawa Marathon

=== Sports ===
- Sakawa River Golf Club

== Notable people from Yamakita ==
- Yoshimi Ozaki, marathon runner
