= Shinsenkyo =

Fictional island in Hell's Paradise: Jigokuraku

Shinsenkyō
- Shinsenkyō, as depicted in the anime adaptation
- Created by: Yuji Kaku
- Based on: China; Mount Penglai

In-universe information
- Type: Island
- Ruled by: Rien
- Location: Southwest of Ryukyu Kingdom
- Characters: List
- Ideal: Tao

Shinsenkyō (Japanese: 神仙郷, lit. 'Divine Paradise'), also known as Kotaku (こたく), is a fictional island and the main setting of the manga series Hell's Paradise: Jigokuraku and its video game adaptation Jigokuraku: Paradise Battle. It is located southwest of the Ryukyu Kingdom. The island is inhabited by a group of monsters known as Lord Tensen and was said to possess the legendary Elixir of Life, which had been sought out by humans for centuries. Kotaku is the main setting throughout the series.

Following the events prompted by the Vanguard Party, the Tao of the island would be destroyed and left on the verge of dying. The creation and design of Shinsenkyo is based on Mount Penglai, a mystic land in Chinese mythology.

== Creation and setting ==
Shinsenkyo is the Chinese-inspired region in Hell's Paradise: Jigokuraku manga series. It is located southwest of the Ryukyu Kingdom. In the Q&A featured in the Jigokuraku Kaitai Shinsho official fanbook, Japanese manga artist Yuji Kaku had confirmed that he was inspired by English writer H. G. Wells' science fiction novel The Island of Doctor Moreau (1896). The island is known as the location of the elixir of life, in which the death row criminals must retrieve to obtain a pardon for their crimes by the shogunate. Shinsenkyo reflects many traditional Chinese cultural elements in its customs and traditions, which is evident from its inspiration by Mount Penglai, and the many interpretations of topics related to the philosophical concept Tao. Multiple monsters known as Lord Tensen are said to inhabit the island. Kaku created the inhabitants of the island with heavy influences from Chinese Taoist mythology, basing them off the sage group known as the Eight Immortals, who achieved immortality by mastering paradoxes. Kaku had adapted the group into gender-fluid beings that are composed of the Yin-yang balance. The name "Shinsenkyo" itself comes from a real sacred garden in Hakone, Japan, created by Mokichi Okada between 1944 and 1953 as a concept of paradise on earth. In English, Shinsenkyo (神仙郷) translates to "Divine Paradise". The island is also made up of three regions: Eishū, Hōjo, and Hōrai.

=== History ===
A thousand years ago, Chinese explorer Jofuku had found the island following his quest to retrieve the legendary elixir of life for Emperor Qin Shi Huang. He declared himself ruler and devoted his life to researching the secrets of immortality by experimenting with Tao, resulting in the creations of multiple abnormal creatures. People accompanying Jofuku were converted into the Hōko race.

After Jofuku's death from Arborification, his wife Rien committed to his revival by continuing his research and developing an elixir of life with the help of around several life-forms created with her own Tao. Together, they became the new rulers of Kotaku known as Lord Tensen. While devoting themselves to the ways of Tao in Hōrai, they guided the Hōko through the Sōshin using fabricated beliefs involving mortality in order to secretly observe their way of life, as well as use them as resources to replenish lost Tao in the midst of training. After 200 years, the Hōko reached the verge of extinction from prevalence of Arborification, the gradual transformation of living beings into stationary plants. This concerned members of Lord Tensen, who were worried about losing their main source of nourishment. This spawned the idea of luring in humans from the mainland to act as the source. The plan was successful as they managed to ambush the first group of humans who came to the island. Using the Waitanhua Flower, they can extract Tao from other life-forms.
