= Good Smile Company =

Japanese figure company

Good Smile Company, Inc.
- Native name: 株式会社グッドスマイルカンパニー
- Romanized name: Kabushiki gaisha Guddo Sumairu Kanpanī
- Type: Private
- Industry: Video games, hobby goods, figures
- Founded: May 1, 2001; 25 years ago
- Founder: Aki Takanori
- Headquarters: Akiba CO Building, 3-16-12 Sotokanda, Tokyo, Japan
- Products: Nendoroid, Figma
- Website: goodsmileus.com

Good Smile Company, Inc. (株式会社グッドスマイルカンパニー, Kabushiki-gaisha Guddo Sumairu Kanpanī; also known as GSC or Good Smile) is a Japanese video game developer and hobby product manufacturer headquartered in Chiyoda, Japan. It was formed in May 2001 as an event management and talent company by corporate executive Takanori Aki. The company's products include that of the Nendoroid and Figma product lines, as well as scale figures primarily in PVC. In addition to production and manufacturing, it is also known for its racing team, Good Smile Racing.

== History ==
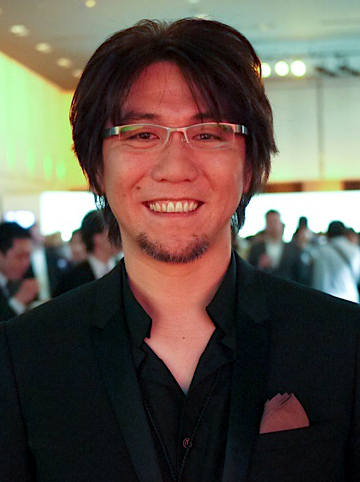
Corporate executive Aki Takanori founded the company in May 2001.

Good Smile Company was founded by Aki Takanori in May 2001 as an event management and talent company. The company began working with Max Factory on hobby related products which would soon become the main focus of the company. It is now primarily involved in the planning, production, manufacturing and sales of markets accessories, figures and toys.

The company's attempt to sue its former executives in 2020 was met with a counter-lawsuit, which notably alleged that Good Smile Company invested in 4chan. This claim was later confirmed in a partnership agreement that was obtained through the Freedom of Information Act, revealing that Good Smile Company invested $2.4 million and acquired a 30% share when Hiroyuki Nishimura purchased 4chan for $8 million in 2015. Following significant media coverage, the company would publish a statement that its relationship with 4chan was limited and severed in June 2022.

In August 2025, the company temporarily halted its US shipments due to tariffs imposed by the US government as well as the US cancelling tariff exemptions for packages worth less than US$800. In 2026, it was announced that Good Smile Company was collaborating with Crypton Future Media to develop the video game Hatsune Miku: Starry Party, which is scheduled to release in 2027.

== Products ==
Good Smile company has produced multiple video games, including Touhou LostWord, Smile of the Arsnotoria, Jigokuraku: Paradise Battle, Dark Auction, and Hatsune Miku: Starry Party, among others.

Good Smile Company sells a variety of products with a focus on PVC character figurines. Most products are based on characters from anime, manga, and video games. The Nendoroid line of figures feature stylized chibi designs, while Figma figures have higher levels articulation.

== Good Smile Racing ==
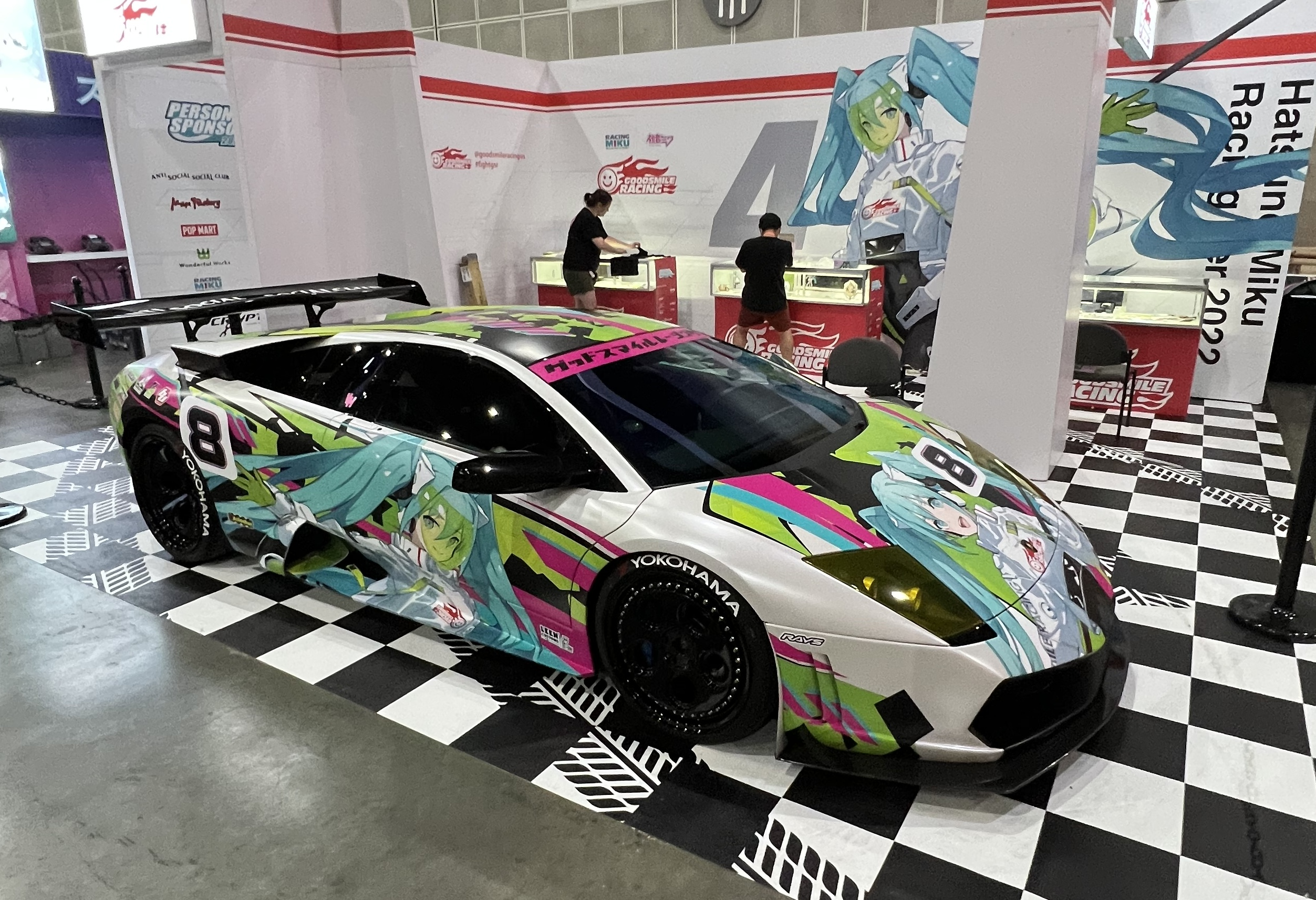
A Lamborghini Murciélago Good Smile Company itasha depicting Hatsune Miku

Takanori Aki began motorsport as a sponsor at 2007 Rally Japan. Good Smile debuted a racing company in Summer 2008, serving as a title sponsor for Studie GLAD Racing, a team managed by BMW, Studie AG, and GLAD Japan. Good Smile Racing is known for its itasha cars, particularly those featuring Hatsune Miku. Good Smile went from being a sponsor to managing the team in 2009 after Studie AG withdrew from Super GT.

Good Smile Racing collaborated with Cox Speed Incorporated for the 2010 season. Studie AG returned as a partner in 2011 and Ukyo Katayama became the team's sporting director. The team won its first race in 2011 at Sepang International Circuit and won its second victory three months later at Fuji Speedway. They ultimately won the GT300 Championship.

For the 2019 24 Hours of Spa, they partnered with Type-Moon (as Type-Moon Racing), TRIGGER, and German racing team Black Falcon to field three Mercedes-AMG GT GT3 cars with Hatsune Miku, Fate, and Promare liveries. Maro Engel drove the Promare-themed car to pole position and would eventually finish third alongside his teammates, while the Hatsune Miku-themed car would finish third in the Silver class.
