= Shasui Falls =

- 洒水の滝
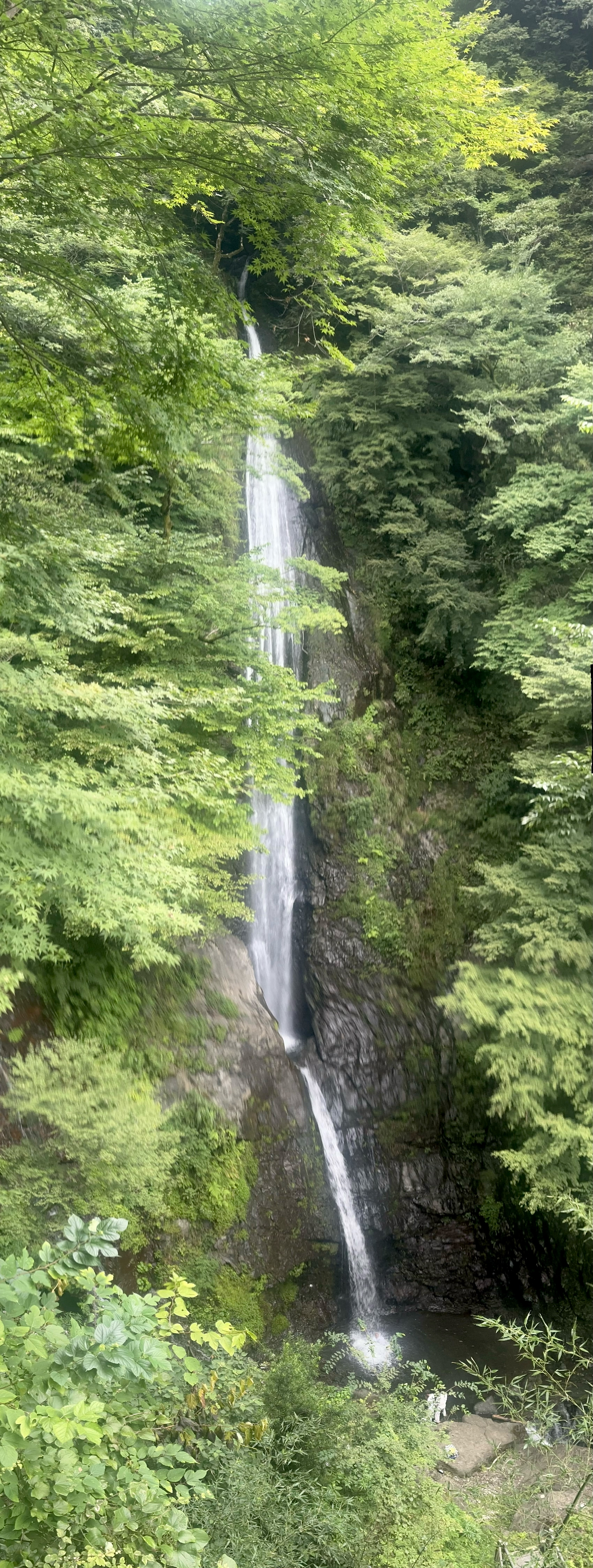
- in 2024

- Location within Japan
- Location: Yamakita, Kanagawa Prefecture, Japan
- Coordinates: 35°21′9″N 139°03′41″E
- Type: multiple fan
- Total height: 90 m (300 ft)
- Number of drops: 3
- Longest drop: 60 m (200 ft)

Shasui Falls (洒水の滝, Shasui-no-taki) is a waterfall on the Tanzawa River in Yamakita, Ashigarakami District, Kanagawa Prefecture, Japan.

The Shasui Falls is located in the precincts of Saishō-ji, a Buddhist temple, and has been used by yamabushi and Buddhist clergy for takegyo purification ceremonies, in which participants stand underneath the fall, allowing the water to strike their head and upper body.

The Shasui Falls drops in three separate plunges with a total height of 90 metres (300 ft). The upper falls has a height of 69 m (226 ft), the middle falls 16 m (52 ft), and the lower falls 29 m (95 ft). The falls are mentioned as the Shasui Falls (蛇水の滝) in the Shin-Sagamikuni Fudoki of 1841, but have been known since at least the late Heian period. During the early Kamakura period, the famed monk Mongaku is said to have spent one hundred days in meditation and austerities at this waterfall, and the temple of Saishō-ji has an image of Fudo Myoo called the "Waterfall Fudō", which it attributes to Mongaku.

The Shasui Falls is listed as one of "Japan's top 100 waterfalls", in a list published by the Japanese Ministry of the Environment in 1990. It is also one of the "50 scenic spots of Kanagawa Prefecture" in a 1979 listing published by the Kanagawa Prefecture Tourism Association.

== Gallery ==
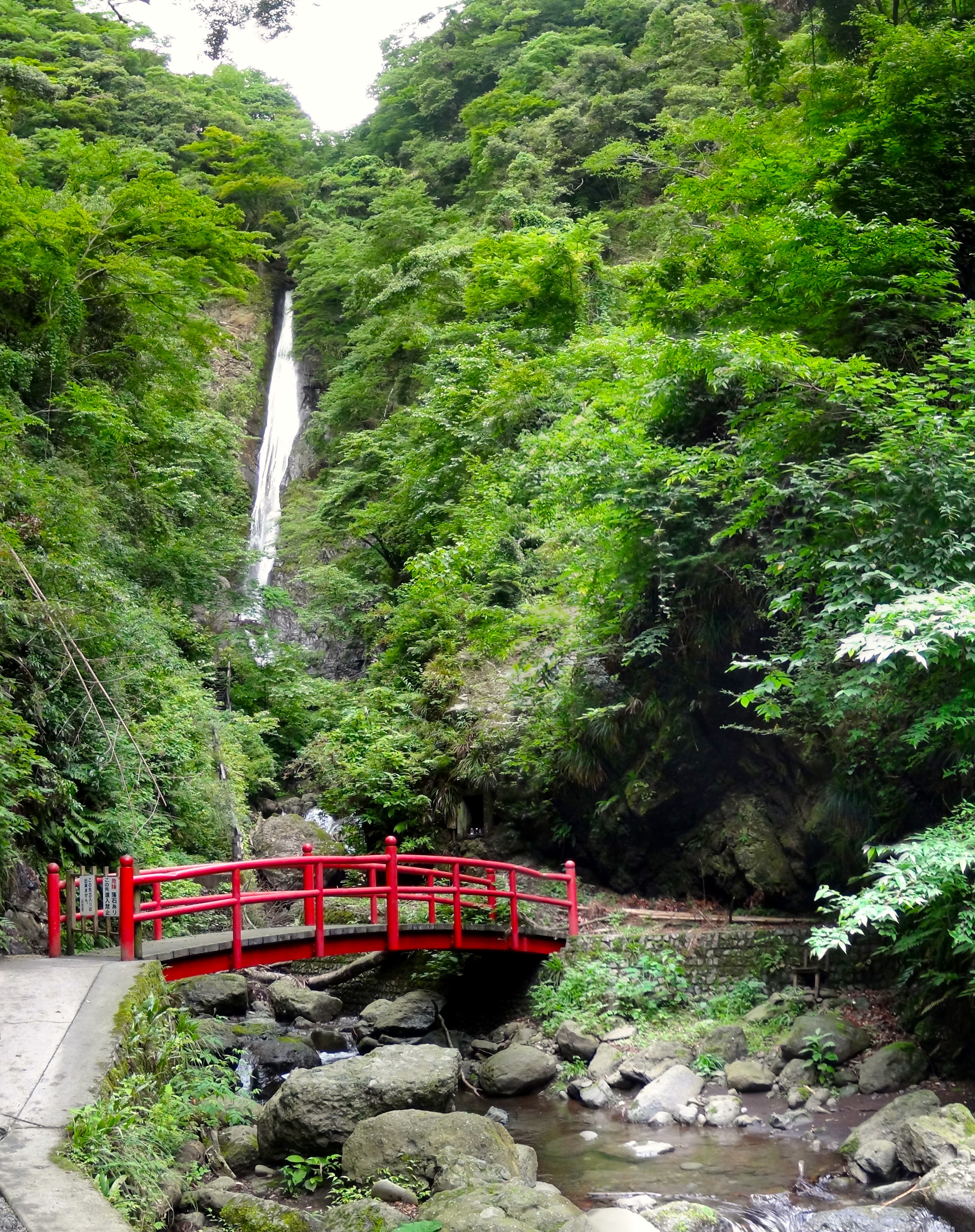
Closed gate on a bridge near the waterfalls, 2014

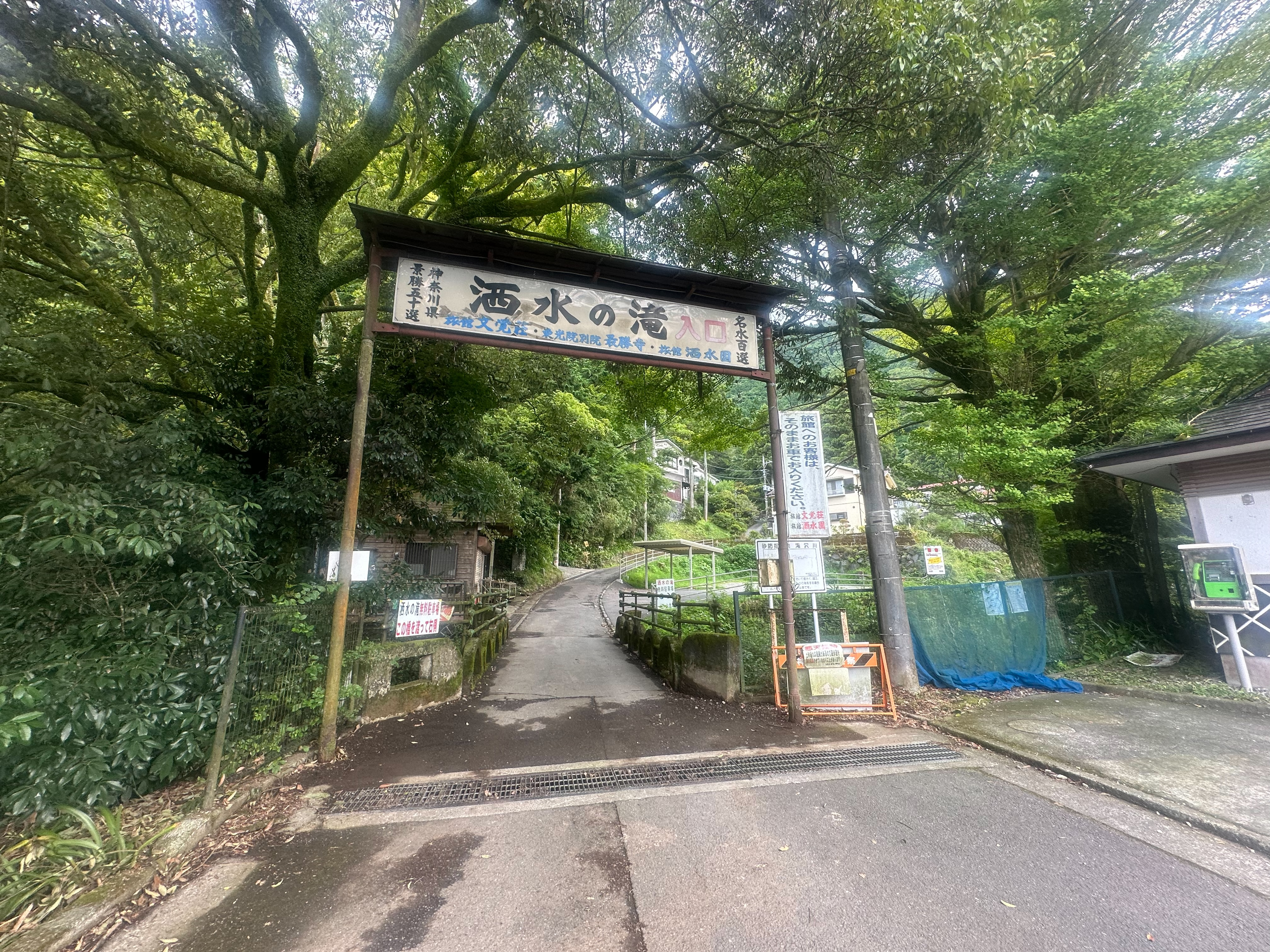
Entrance, 2024

Shasui Falls in summer
