= Nagaru Tanigawa =

Japanese author (born 1970)

- Born: December 19, 1970 (age 55); Nishinomiya, Japan
- Occupation: Author
- Known for: Haruhi Suzumiya

Nagaru Tanigawa (谷川 流, Tanigawa Nagaru; born December 19, 1970) is a Japanese author. He is a graduate of the law school at Kwansei Gakuin University. He is best known as the creator of the Haruhi Suzumiya light novel series, which was adapted into an anime television series and film, and for which he won the Grand Prize at the eighth annual Sneaker Awards. While Tanigawa was on hiatus from writing his light novel series, he wrote the manga series Amnesia Labyrinth, which was serialized in Dengeki Bunko Magazine.

== Career ==
Tanigawa was born in Nishinomiya City, Hyōgo Prefecture. He attended Hyōgo Prefectural Nishinomiya Kita High School before attending and graduating from Kwansei Gakuin University with a degree in law.

After graduating from university, he worked as a manager at a women's clothing store before making his official debut in March 2003 with the novel Dengeki!! Aegis 5 under Dengeki Bunko's Dengeki Moeoh magazine. On June 7 of the same year, the eighth Sneaker award-winning novel The Melancholy of Haruhi Suzumiya and Tanigawa's Escape from The School! were released on the same day. The Haruhi Suzumiya series has sold 8 million copies in Japan and has been sold in 15 countries around the world, with a total of 16.5 million novel and manga copies sold by May 2011.

In 2018, he was a member of the selection committee for the 24th Sneaker Awards.

== Personal life ==
Tanigawa attended art club and literature club in high school. In university, he was a member of the painting club.

After graduating from college, he worked at a women's clothing store as a manager, but quit to pursue a writing career. While receiving unemployment insurance, Tanigawa frequented the library to read as much as possible. Just as his savings were running out and he felt that he was "doomed", he was contacted by the editorial department of Dengeki Bunko, informing him that his novel The Melancholy of Haruhi Suzumiya had just won the grand prize of the annual Sneaker Awards.

Tanigawa says that his desire to become a writer was triggered by reading various novels from his childhood, and that he gradually developed a "circuit in his mind that he wanted to write." Even after the success of Haruhi Suzumiya, he is "not sure" whether he is truly a writer. In an interview with his editor, Tanigawa was described as a "very quiet and knowledgeable person who uses his 'CPU' and memory to select the knowledge stored in the large hard-disk in his head before outputting in a concise and precise manner."

He was present during the Great Hanshin earthquake. He is a Hanshin Tigers fan. He did not know of the existence of dōjin and eroge until the writing of The Melancholy of Haruhi Suzumiya. He enjoys playing mahjong and likes motorcycles. He uses a thumb-shift keyboard.

== Influences ==
Tanigawa has said that his work is influenced by the science fiction and young adult novels he read during junior high school. In particular, he cites Hideyuki Kikuchi, Baku Yumemakura, Ellery Queen, S. S. Van Dine, and Isaac Asimov as major influences.

In an interview with screenwriter Dai Satō, he said that he prefers Mamoru Oshii's anime film adaptations of Urusei Yatsura to the original manga, in particular enjoying Urusei Yatsura 2: Beautiful Dreamer.

== Works ==
=== Light novels ===
Haruhi Suzumiya (涼宮ハルヒ, Suzumiya Haruhi)

- The Melancholy of Haruhi Suzumiya (涼宮ハルヒの憂鬱, Suzumiya Haruhi no Yūutsu) — ISBN 4-04-429201-9
- The Sigh of Haruhi Suzumiya (涼宮ハルヒの溜息, Suzumiya Haruhi no Tameiki) — ISBN 4-04-429202-7
- The Boredom of Haruhi Suzumiya (涼宮ハルヒの退屈, Suzumiya Haruhi no Taikutsu) — ISBN 4-04-429203-5
- The Disappearance of Haruhi Suzumiya (涼宮ハルヒの消失, Suzumiya Haruhi no Shōshitsu) — ISBN 4-04-429204-3
- The Rampage of Haruhi Suzumiya (涼宮ハルヒの暴走, Suzumiya Haruhi no Bōsō) — ISBN 4-04-429205-1
- The Wavering of Haruhi Suzumiya (涼宮ハルヒの動揺, Suzumiya Haruhi no Dōyō) — ISBN 4-04-429206-X
- The Intrigues of Haruhi Suzumiya (涼宮ハルヒの陰謀, Suzumiya Haruhi no Inbō) — ISBN 4-04-429207-8
- The Indignation of Haruhi Suzumiya (涼宮ハルヒの憤慨, Suzumiya Haruhi no Fungai) — ISBN 4-04-429208-6
- The Dissociation of Haruhi Suzumiya (涼宮ハルヒの分裂, Suzumiya Haruhi no Bunretsu) — ISBN 978-4-04-429209-6
- The Surprise of Haruhi Suzumiya (First Part) (涼宮ハルヒの驚愕 (前), Suzumiya Haruhi no Kyōgaku (Zen)) — ISBN 978-4-04-429211-9 (regular edition), ISBN 978-4-04-429210-2 (limited edition)
- The Surprise of Haruhi Suzumiya (Last Part) (涼宮ハルヒの驚愕 (後), Suzumiya Haruhi no Kyōgaku (Go)) — ISBN 978-4-04-429212-6 (regular edition), ISBN 978-4-04-429210-2 (limited edition)
- The Intuition of Haruhi Suzumiya (涼宮ハルヒの直観, Suzumiya Haruhi no Chokkan) — ISBN 978-4-04-110792-8

Let's Leave the School (学校を出よう!, Gakkō o Deyō!)

- Escape from The School — ISBN 4-8402-2355-6
- I-My-Me — ISBN 4-8402-2433-1
- The Laughing Bootleg — ISBN 4-8402-2486-2
- Final Destination — ISBN 4-8402-2632-6
- Not Dead or Not Alive — ISBN 4-8402-2781-0
- Vampire Syndrome — ISBN 4-8402-2828-0

Dengeki Aegis 5

- Dengeki!! Aegis 5 (電撃!! イージス5) — ISBN 4-8402-2852-3
- Dengeki!! Aegis 5 Act.II (電撃!! イージス5 Act.II) — ISBN 4-8402-3173-7

The Closed Universe

- The Despairing Ones (絶望系 閉じられた世界, Zetsubōkei Tojirareta Sekai) — ISBN 4-8402-3021-8

The Guardian of My World

- Boku no Sekai o Mamoru Hito (僕のセカイをまもるヒト) — ISBN 4-8402-3206-7
- Boku no Sekai o Mamoru Hito 2 (僕のセカイをまもるヒト 2) — ISBN 4-8402-3444-2
- Boku no Sekai o Mamoru Hito ex (僕のセカイをまもるヒト ex) — ISBN 4-8402-3615-1

=== Manga ===
Amnesia Labyrinth

- Amnesia Labyrinth 1 (蜻蛉迷宮 1, Kagerō Meikyū 1) — ISBN 4-04-868067-6
- Amnesia Labyrinth 2 (蜻蛉迷宮 2, Kagerō Meikyū 2) — ISBN 4-04-868301-2

=== Collaborations ===
Bokusatsu Tenshi Dokuro-chan Desu

- Bokusatsu Tenshi Dokuro-chan Desu (撲殺天使ドクロちゃんです) — ISBN 4-8402-3443-4
