= Figma (toy) =

Japanese line of action figures

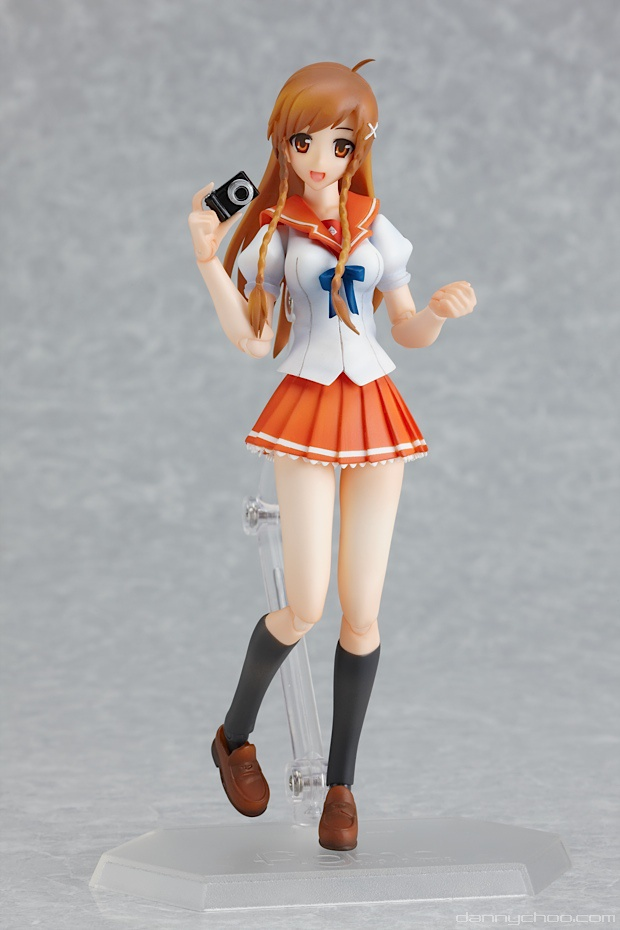
- Product type: Manga-style action figure
- Current owner: Max Factory
- Country: Japan
- Introduced: 2008; 18 years ago
- Website: maxfactory.jp

Figma (フィグマ) is a Japanese brand of an action figure line produced by Max Factory and distributed by Good Smile Company. The product series was created by Max Factory CEO Max Watanabe and Masaki Asai, as a "counter" to the Kaiyodo Revoltech figurines, with a focus on articulation. Each figma comes with various accessories such as exchangeable faceplates and hands, and other optional parts.

The line mainly features figures that are significant in pop culture in Japan, primarily characters from Japanese anime, manga, and video games, with the occasional Western character or real person such as Billy Herrington, who had significance in Japanese pop culture due to internet memes in the country.

The first Figma was a special edition Haruhi Suzumiya with the product code SP001 included with the limited edition release of the PS2 game, Suzumiya Haruhi no Tomadoi, released on January 31, 2008. The first regular release figma, Yuki Nagato from the series The Melancholy of Haruhi Suzumiya was released in February 2008.

The line is sold in Japan and has received coverage in publications including Famitsu and Dengeki Hobby.

== Specifications ==
The Figma series is an articulated series of figures made from ABS and PVC. Each figure includes an articulated stand. The height of the figures is around 13–16 cm, varying depending on the height of the character. Each figma usually comes with a number of different faceplates and hands. Some parts are compatible between different figma figures, making it possible to swap parts and create unique combinations. A flexible plastic is used in areas likely to hinder articulation, such as skirts or scarves.

== Figma products ==
A number of figma-related products and product lines exist, as described below.

=== Figma Series ===
The primary figma series is split into three different variants:

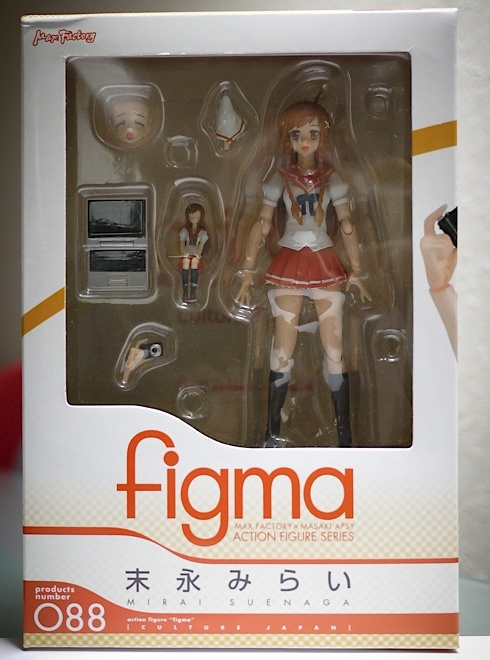
Figma Mirai Suenaga figure and box

- Normal edition figmas with three-digit product codes, such as 001.
- Special edition figmas with three-digit product codes preceded by SP, such as SP001, which are primarily releases produced under license as tie-ins with other companies. Some are bonus items for limited edition release video games, DVDs, or other products.
- Limited edition figmas with three-digit product codes preceded by EX, such as EX001, sold at events such as Wonder Festival, a semi-annual event hosted by Good Smile Company, sometimes released via mail-order or through online orders.

=== di:stage ===
The di:stage series is a series of display units and expansions for figma figures. The base unit is a 10 cm x 10 cm stage with multiple joints to create different background landscapes. The line has been discontinued, having seen no new releases since 2009.

=== ex:ride ===
The ex:ride series is a series of small vehicles such as motorbikes, in scale with figma figures.

=== figma vehicles ===
The figma vehicles branding was used only for the tanks and accessories of the anime Girls und Panzer, such as the Panzer IV Ausf. D (Type D). The tanks are not officially scaled, but are in scale to Figma figures, putting them at near to 1:12. The first vehicle, the Panzer IV Ausf. D "Finals" version, was released in October 2015.

=== figFIX ===
Lower-priced figures with no articulation in scale with and by the same sculptors as figma figures, to ensure consistency when displayed alongside the line. Some of their parts are compatible with figma.

=== figma Styles ===
A series of items for changing the fashion of figma figures, ranging from full figures where the intent is for the purchaser to swap the heads out (the figma Styles bodies come with generic heads), to figma-scaled fabric doll clothing.

=== figma Plus ===
Branding reserved for other products released with consistency with the figma line that do not fit into pre-existing lines, such as diorama-like sets or miniatures of game consoles.
