= Rendaiji Station =

Railway station in Shimoda, Shizuoka Prefecture, Japan

Rendaiji Station 蓮台寺駅
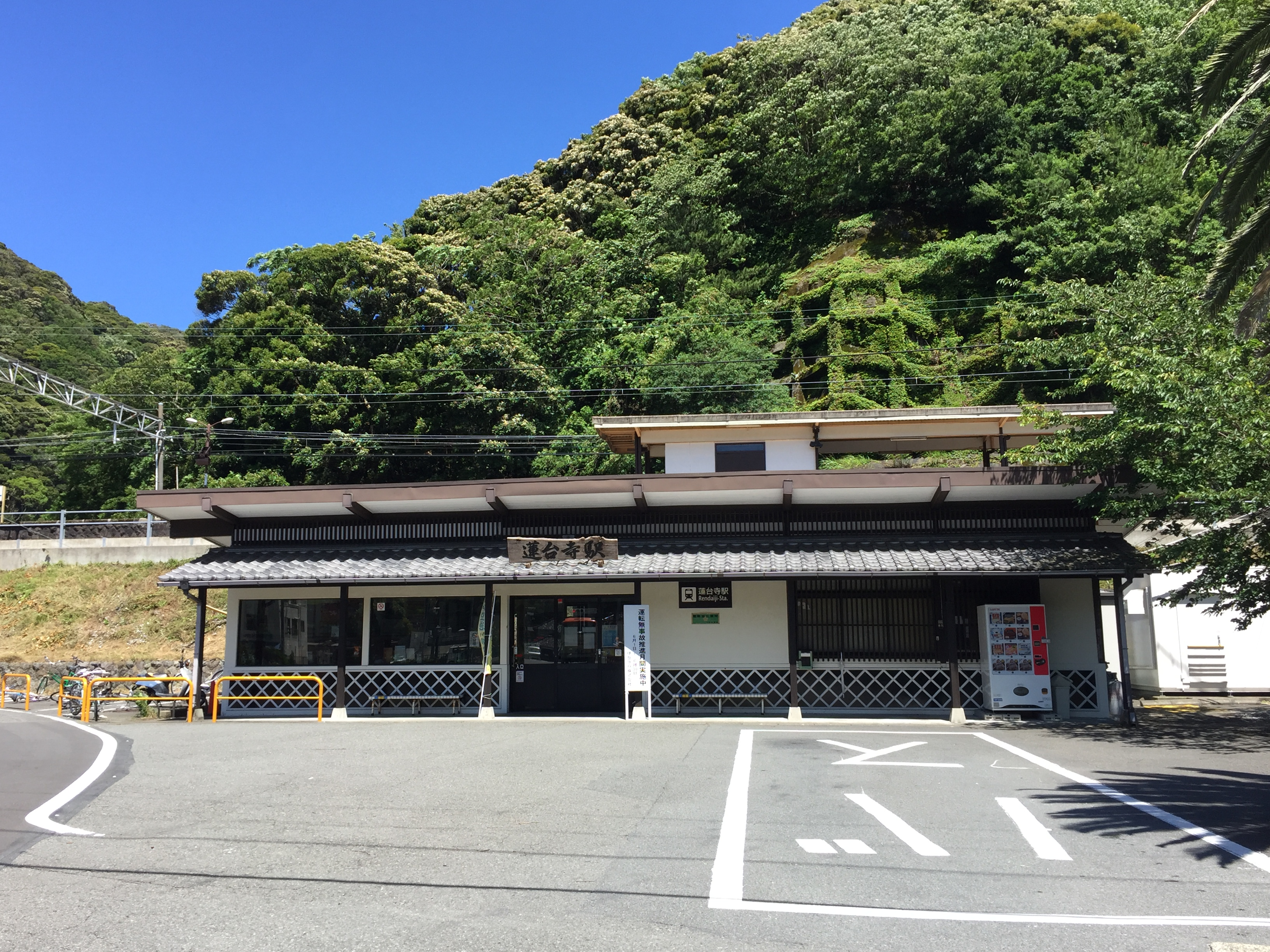
- Exterior of Rendaiji Station in June 2019

General information
- Location: Kawauchi 907-6, Shimoda-shi, Shizuoka-ken; Japan
- Coordinates: 34°41′59″N 138°56′28″E
- Operator: Izukyū Corporation
- Line: ■ Izu Kyūkō Line
- Distance: 43.4 kilometers from Itō
- Platforms: 1 island platform

Other information
- Status: Staffed
- Station code: IZ15

History
- Opened: December 10, 1961.

Passengers
- FY2017: 386 daily
Location
- Location within Shizuoka Prefecture Location within Japan

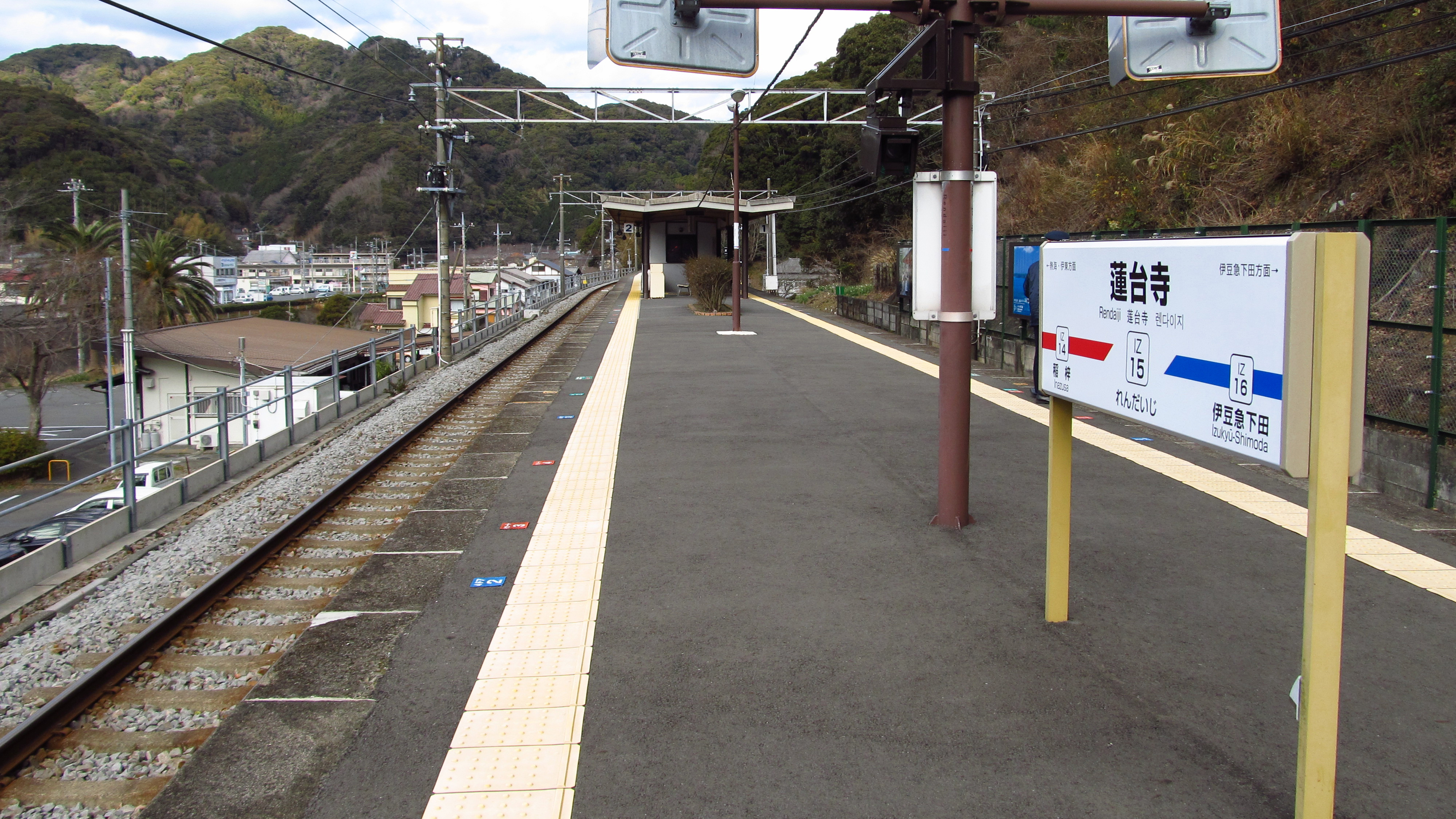
Platform

Rendaiji Station (蓮台寺駅, Rendaiji-eki) is a railway station in the city of Shimoda, Shizuoka Prefecture, Japan, operated by the privately owned Izu Kyūkō Line. The station code for Rendaiji Station is IZ15.

== Lines ==
Rendaiji Station is served by the Izu Kyūkō Line. It is located 43.4 kilometers from the official starting point of the line at Itō and 60.3 kilometers from Atami.

The Tokai bus line runs buses from Rendaiji Station on a route which has four stops, ending in Rendaiji.

== Station layout ==
The station has a single elevated island platform serving two tracks, and the station building is underneath the platforms and tracks. The station is unmanned. There is a parking lot at the station which charges ¥800 per day.

=== Platforms ===
1	■ Izu Kyūkō Line	Izukyū Shimoda
2	■ Izu Kyūkō Line	Itō ・ Izu-Atagawa・ Izu-Kōgen ・ Atami

== Adjacent stations ==
«	Service	»
Izu Kyūkō Line
Inazusa	Local	Izukyū Shimoda

== History ==
Rendaiji Station was opened on December 10, 1961.

== Passenger statistics ==
In fiscal 2017, the station was used by an average of 386 passengers daily (boarding passengers only).

== Surrounding area ==
- Inosawa Elementary School
- Inosawa Middle School
- Rendaiji onsen

== See also ==
- List of railway stations in Japan
