= Izu-Inatori Station =

Railway station in Higashiizu, Shizuoka Prefecture, Japan

Izu-Inatori Station 伊豆稲取駅
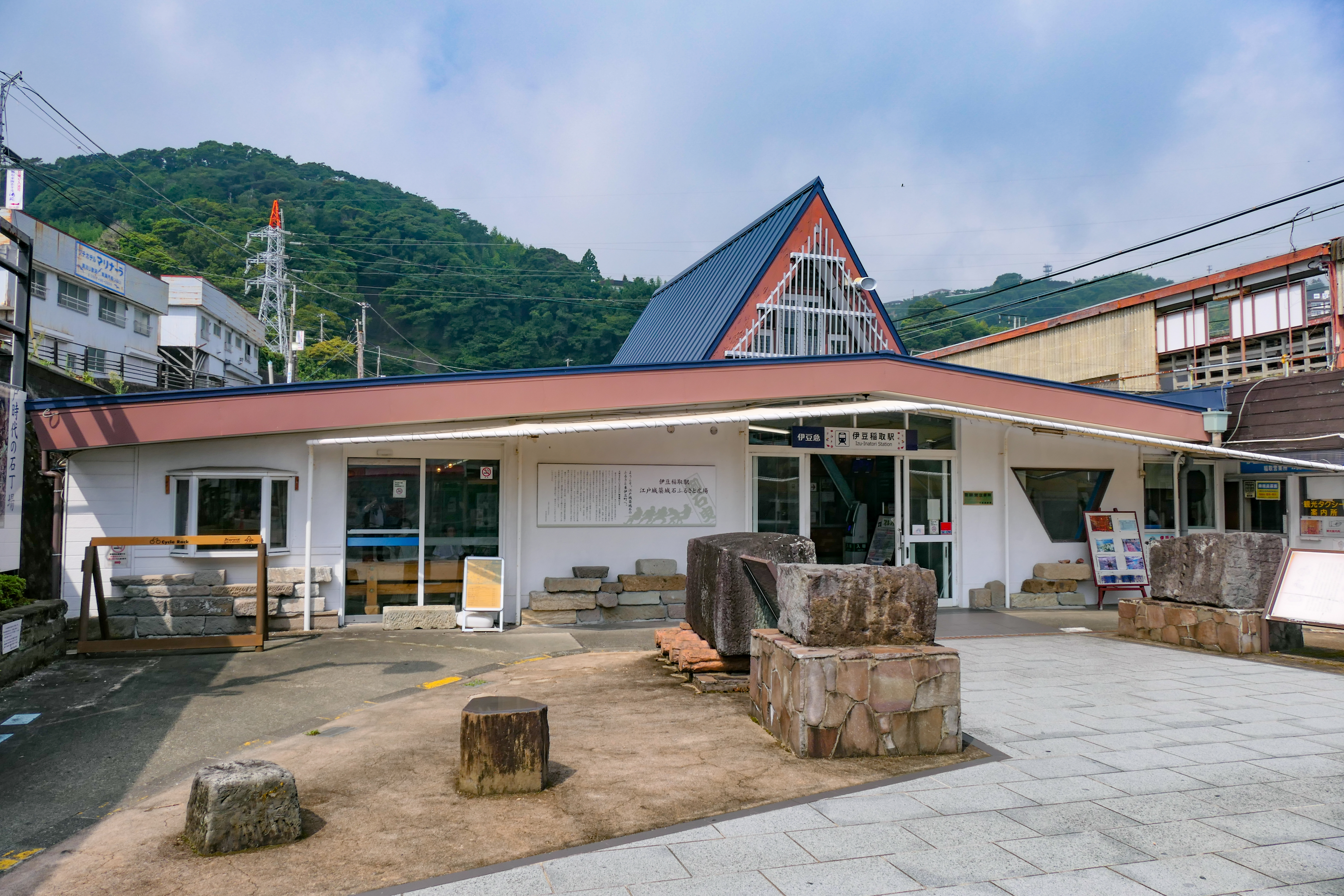
- Exterior of Izu-Inatori Station

General information
- Location: Inatori-aza, Deguchi, Higashiizu-cho, Kamo-gun, Shizuoka-ken 413-0411; Japan
- Coordinates: 34.774333°N 139.037097°E
- Operator: Izukyū Corporation
- Line: ■ Izu Kyūkō Line
- Distance: 30.3 kilometers from Itō
- Platforms: 2 side platforms

Other information
- Status: Staffed
- Station code: IZ11

History
- Opened: December 10, 1961.

Passengers
- FY2017: 795 daily
Location
- Location within Shizuoka Prefecture Location within Japan

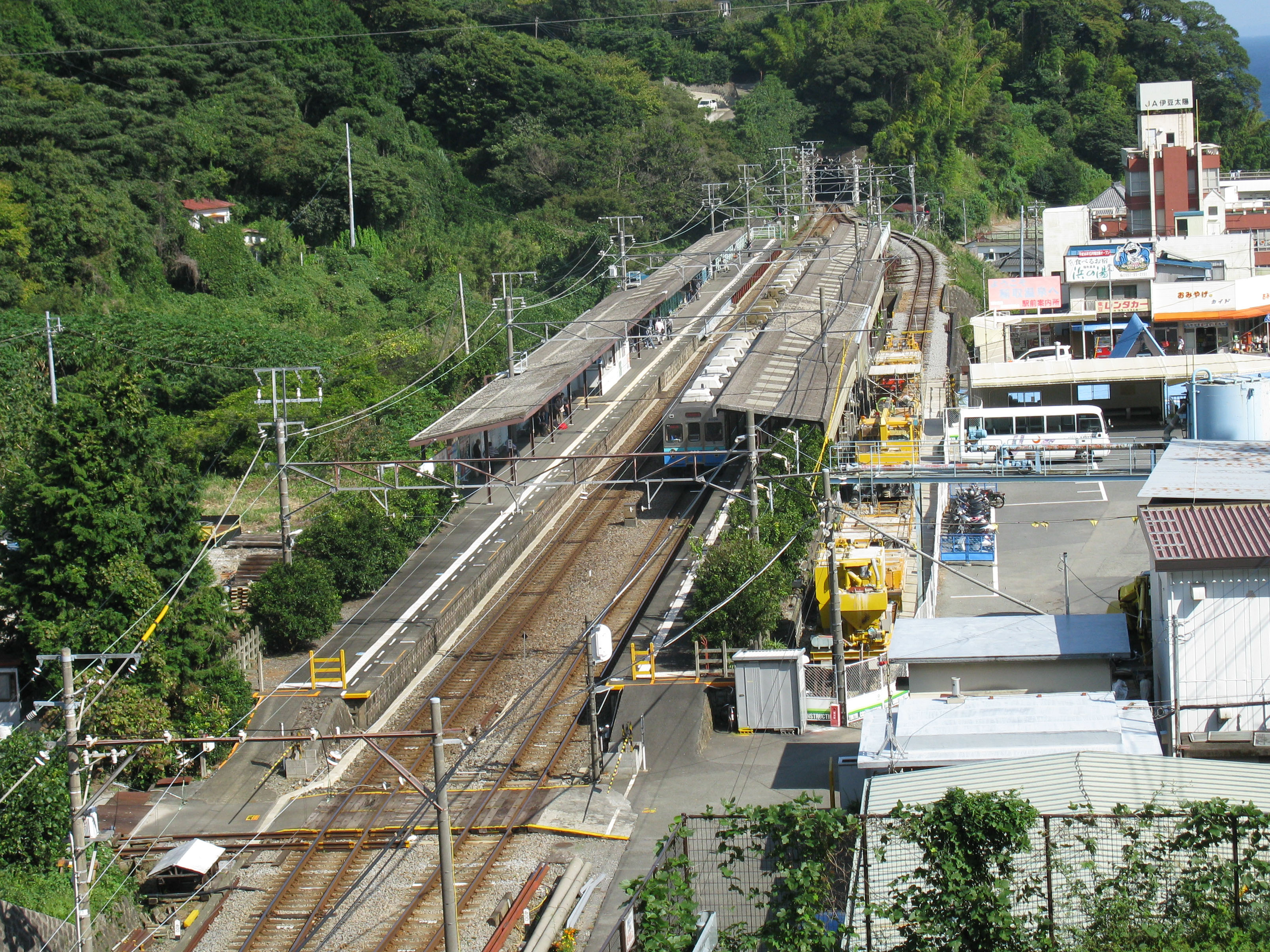
Overhead view of Izu-Inatori Station

Izu-Inatori Station (伊豆稲取駅, Izu-Inatori-eki) is a railway station in the town of Higashiizu, Shizuoka Prefecture, Japan, operated by the privately owned Izu Kyūkō Line.

== Lines ==
Izu-Inatori Station is served by the Izu Kyūkō Line, and is located 30.3 kilometers from the official starting point of the line at Itō and is 47.2 kilometers from Atami.

== Station layout ==
Izu-Inatori Station has two elevated opposing side platforms serving two tracks on an embankment. The platforms are connected by a level crossing, and the station building is at a lower level to one side. The station is staffed.

=== Platforms ===
1	■ Izu Kyūkō Line	Kawazu ・ Izukyū Shimoda
2	■ Izu Kyūkō Line	Itō ・ Izu-Atagawa・ Izu-Kōgen ・ Atami・ Yokohama・ Tokyo

== Adjacent stations ==
«	Service	»
Izu Kyūkō Line
Izu-Atagawa	Limited Express	Kawazu
Katase-Shirata	Local	Imaihama-Kaigan

== History ==
Izu-Inatori Station was opened on December 10, 1961.

== Passenger statistics ==
In the fiscal year of 2017, the station was used by an average of 795 passengers daily (boarding passengers only).

== Surrounding area ==
- Inatori Onsen
- Inatori High School

== See also ==
- List of railway stations in Japan
