= Izu-Hokkawa Station =

Railway station in Higashiizu, Shizuoka Prefecture, Japan

Izu Hokkawa Station 伊豆北川駅
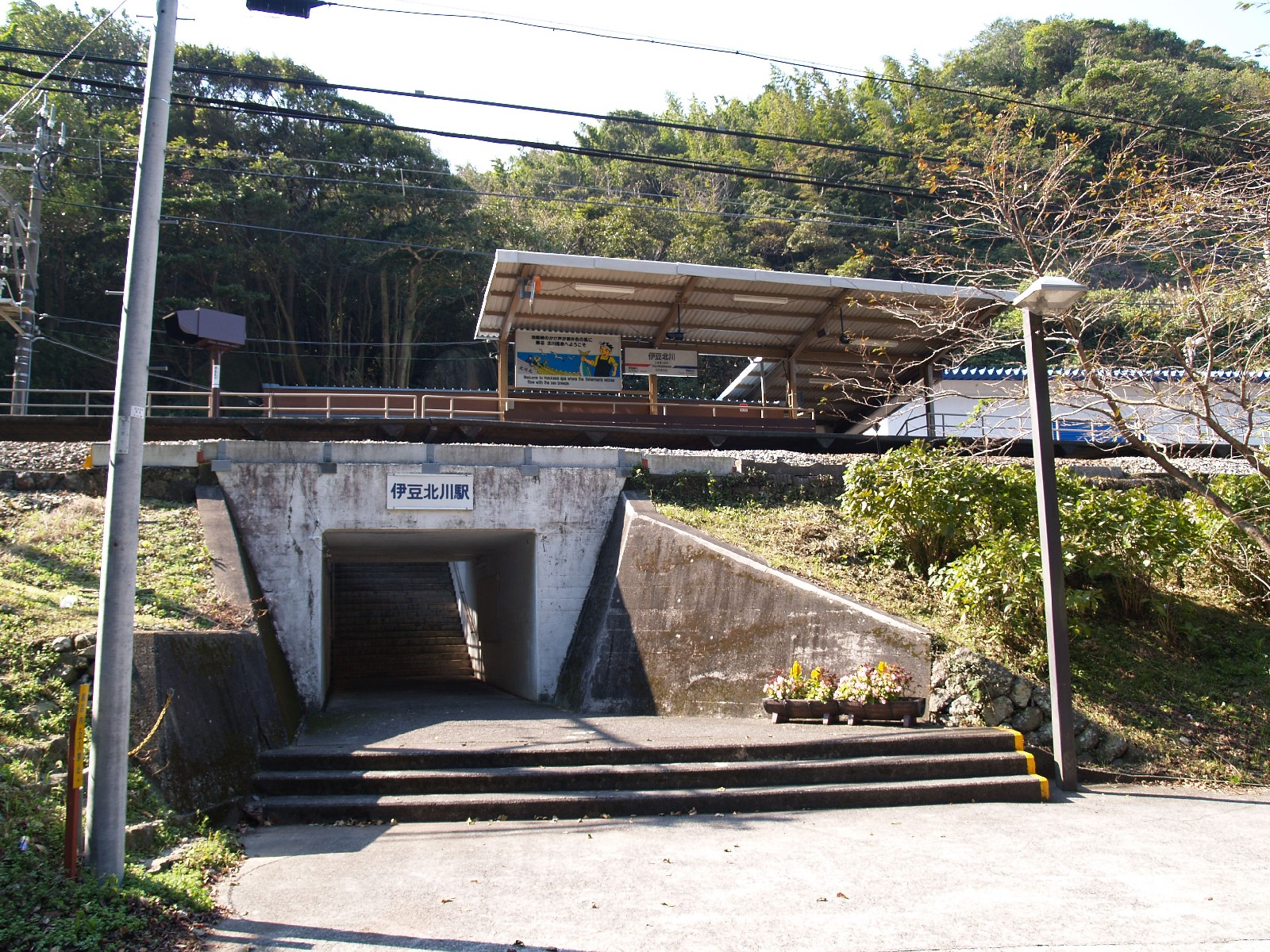
- Exterior of Izu-Hokkawa Station in November 2008

General information
- Location: Naramoto, Higashiizu-cho, Kamo-gun, Shizuoka-ken 413-0302; Japan
- Coordinates: 34°49′37″N 139°4′33″E
- Operator: Izukyū Corporation
- Line: ■ Izu Kyūkō Line
- Distance: 22.9 kilometers from Itō
- Platforms: 1 side platform

Other information
- Status: Unstaffed
- Station code: IZ08

History
- Opened: December 10, 1961

Passengers
- FY2017: 31 daily
Location
- Location within Shizuoka Prefecture Location within Japan

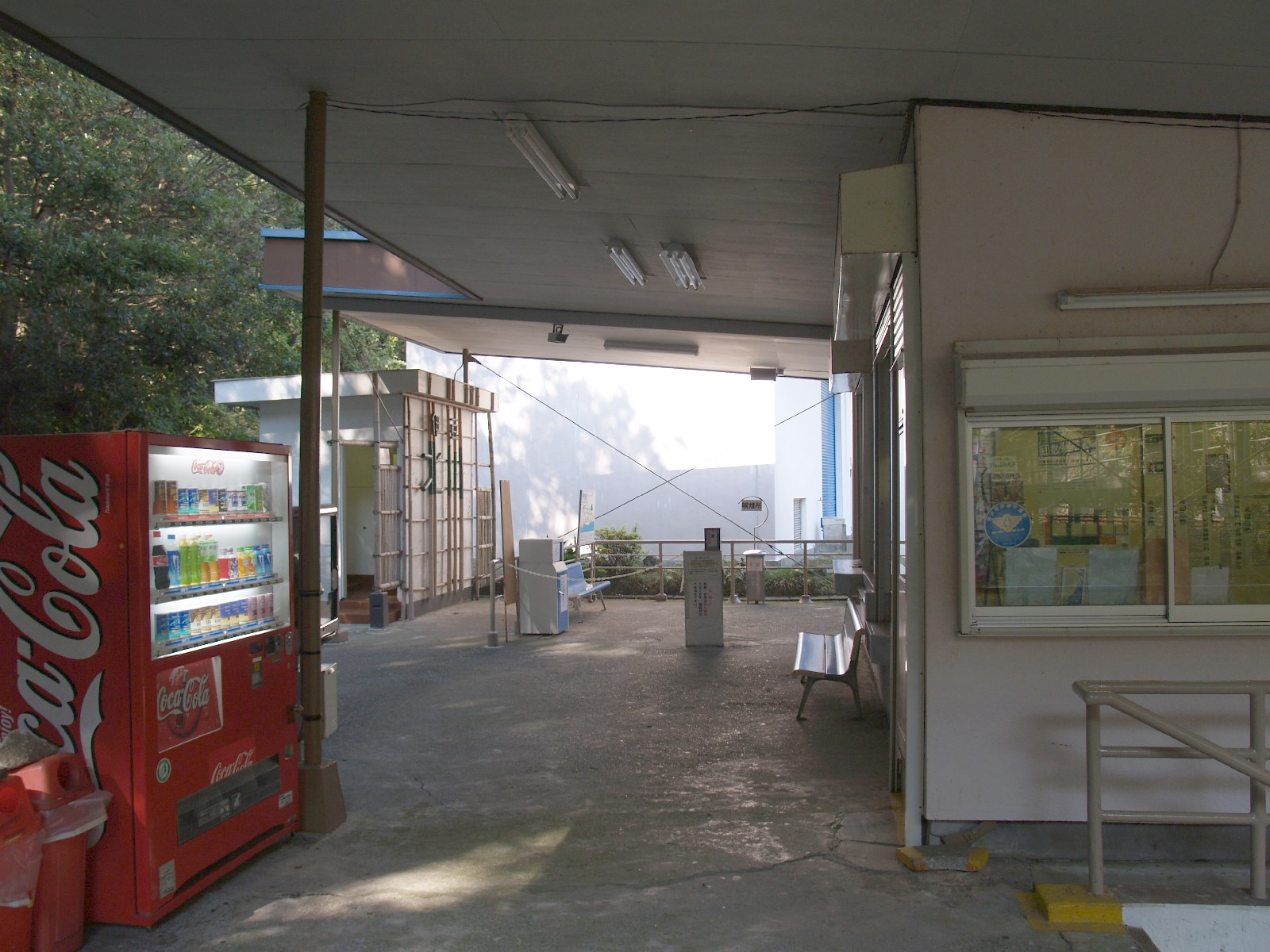
Inside the station

Izu-Hokkawa Station (伊豆北川駅, Izu-Hokkawa-eki) is a railway station in the town of Higashiizu, Shizuoka Prefecture, Japan, operated by the privately owned Izu Kyūkō Line.

== Lines ==
Izu-Hokkawa Station is served by the Izu Kyūkō Line and is located 22.9 kilometers (14.2 mi) from the official starting point of the line at Itō and 39.8 kilometers (24.7 mi) from Atami.

== Station layout ==
Izu-Hokkawa Station has a single elevated side platform. The station building is located below the side platform. The station is not attended.

== Adjacent stations ==
«	Service	»
Izu Kyūkō Line
Izu-Ōkawa	Local	Izu-Atagawa

== History ==
Izu-Hokkawa Station was opened on December 10, 1961.

On February 5th 2025, Izukyū Corporation unveiled a 39-character promotional sub-name for it. The station's new sub-name translates to, "The station where you eat Hokkawa ajizushi (horse mackerel sushi), take an open-air Kuroneiwa bath by the waves, and encounter the Moon Road," the last part referring to the path of light reflected by the moon on the ocean surface.

== Passenger statistics ==
In the fiscal year of 2017, the station was used by an average of 31 passengers daily (counting only boarding passengers).

== Surrounding area ==
- Hokkawa Onsen

== See also ==
- List of railway stations in Japan
