= Imaihama-Kaigan Station =

Railway station in Kawazu, Shizuoka Prefecture, Japan

Imaihama-Kaigan Station 今井浜海岸駅
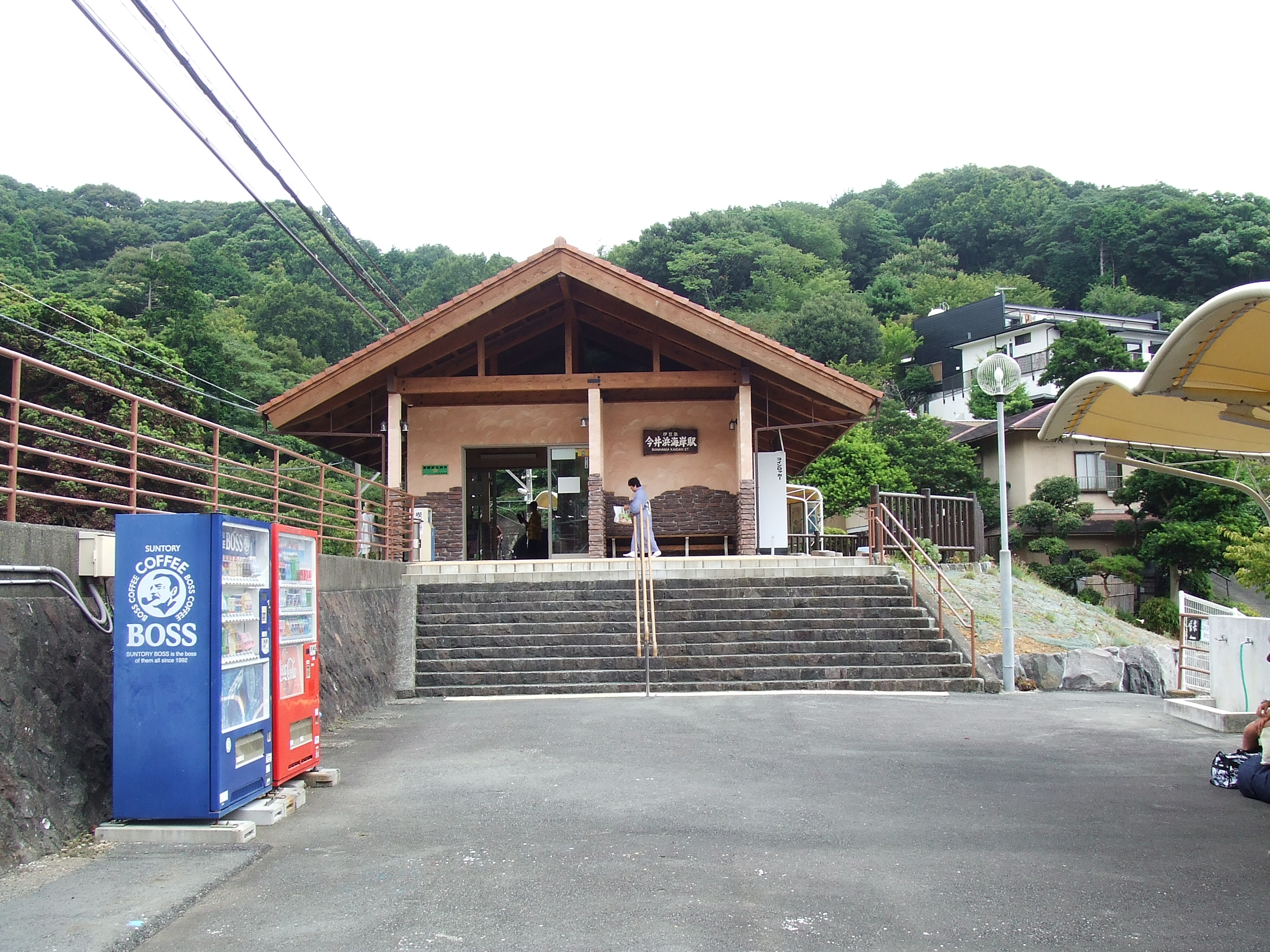
- Exterior of Imaihama-Kaigan Station in August 2008

General information
- Location: Kawazu-machi, Kamo-gun, Shizuoka-ken; Japan
- Coordinates: 34°45′14″N 139°0′17″E
- Operator: Izukyū Corporation
- Line: ■ Izu Kyūkō Line
- Distance: 34.2 kilometers from Itō
- Platforms: 1 side platform

Other information
- Status: Staffed
- Station code: IZ12

History
- Opened: December 10, 1961.

Passengers
- FY2017: 132 daily
Location
- Location within Shizuoka Prefecture Location within Japan

Imaihama-Kaigan Station (今井浜海岸駅, Imaihama-Kaigan-eki) is a railway station in the town of Kawazu, Shizuoka Prefecture, Japan, operated by the privately owned Izu Kyūkō Line .

== Lines ==
Imaihama-Kaigan Station is served by the Izu Kyūkō Line, and is located 34.2 kilometers from the official starting point of the line at Itō and 51.1 kilometers from Atami.

== Station layout ==
The station has one side platform sandwiched between two tunnels. The platform length is equivalent in length to eight train cars access to trains is limited only to the middle seven cars. The station building is a log cabin style building, using wood from the surrounding forests.

== Adjacent stations ==
«	Service	»
Izu Kyūkō Line
Izu-Inatori	Local	Kawazu

== History ==
Imaihama-Kaigan Station was opened on December 10, 1961, initially as a temporary stop only open during the summer months due to its proximity to nearby swimming beaches. It became a permanent station on March 1, 1969. A new station building was completed in July 2006.

== Passenger statistics ==
In fiscal 2017, the station was used by an average of 132 passengers daily. As of 2020, this number has gone down to 86 passengers per day.

== Surrounding area ==
- Japan National Route 135

== See also ==
- List of railway stations in Japan
