= Kawazu Station =

Railway station in Kawazu, Shizuoka Prefecture, Japan

Kawazu Station 河津駅
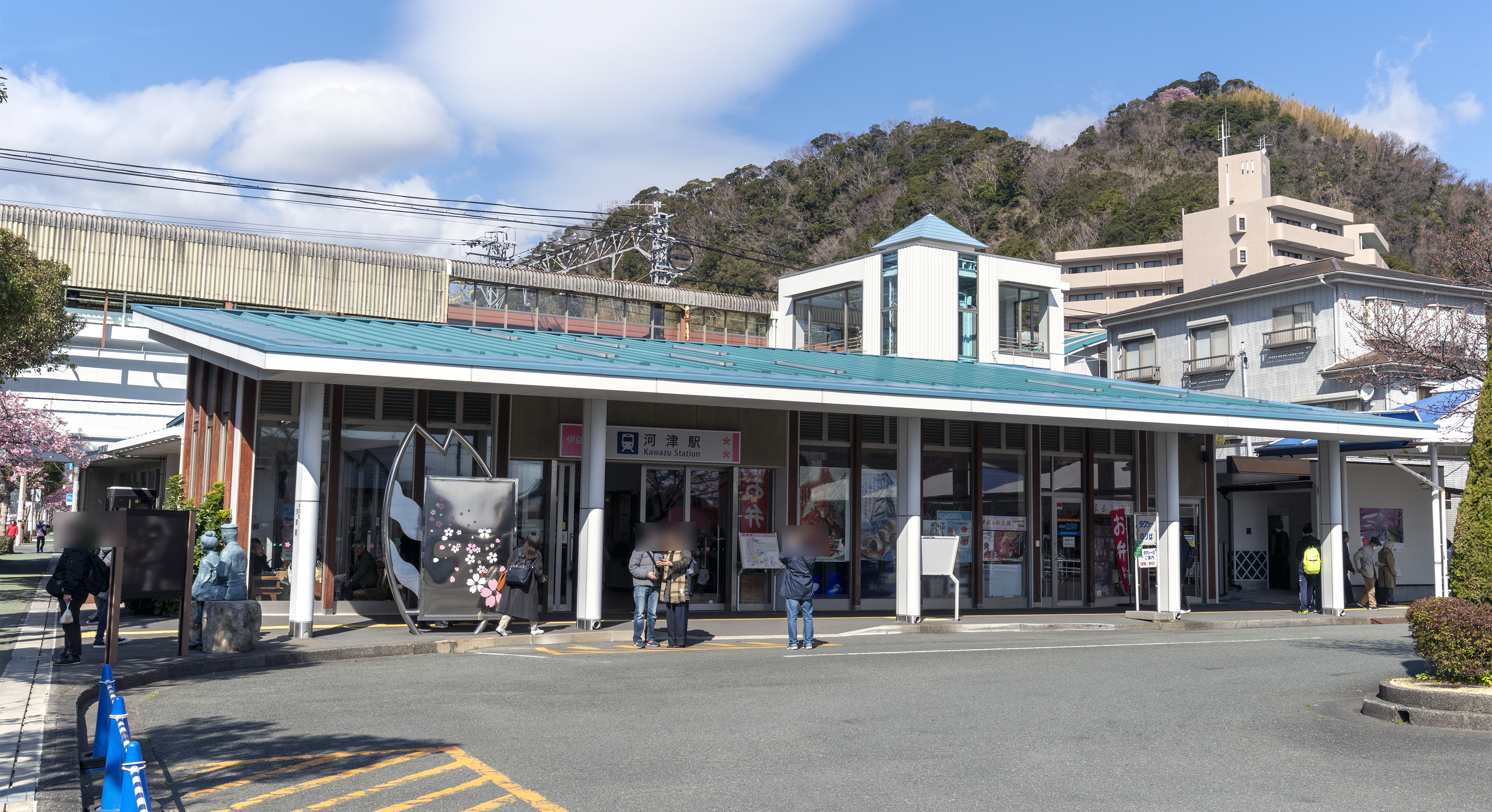
- Exterior of Kawazu Station, February 2020

General information
- Location: Hama-aze, Nakakōji, Kawazu-machi, Kamo-gun, Shizuoka-ken 413-0513; Japan
- Coordinates: 34°44′51″N 138°59′46″E
- Operator: Izukyū Corporation
- Line: ■ Izu Kyūkō Line
- Distance: 35.3 kilometers from Itō
- Platforms: 2 side platforms

Other information
- Status: Staffed
- Station code: IZ13

History
- Opened: December 10, 1961

Passengers
- FY2017: 793 daily
Location
- Location within Shizuoka Prefecture Location within Japan

Kawazu Station (河津駅, Kawazu-eki) is a railway station in the town of Kawazu, Shizuoka Prefecture, Japan, operated by the privately owned Izu Kyūkō Line .

== Lines ==
Kawazu Station is served by the Izu Kyūkō Line, and is located 35.3 kilometers from the official starting point of the line at Itō and is 52.2 kilometers from Atami.

== Station layout ==
The station has two elevated opposing side platforms serving two tracks. The platforms are connected by an underpass, and the station building is underneath the platforms and tracks. The station is staffed.

=== Platforms ===
| 1 | ■ Izu Kyūkō Line | Izukyū Shimoda |
| 2 | ■ Izu Kyūkō Line | Itō ・ Izu-Atagawa・ Izu-Kōgen ・ Atami・ Yokohama・ Tokyo |

== Adjacent stations ==
| « | Service | » |
Izu Kyūkō Line
| Izu-Inatori | Limited Express | Izukyū-Shimoda |
| Imaihama-Kaigan | Local | Inazusa |

== History ==
Kawazu Station was opened on December 10, 1961.

== Passenger statistics ==
In fiscal 2017, the station was used by an average of 793 passengers daily (boarding passengers only).

== Surrounding area ==
- Kawazu Town Hall
- Japan National Route 135

== See also ==
- List of railway stations in Japan
