= Kawayu =

Kawayu (川湯) may refer to several places in Japan:

- Kawayu Onsen in Teshikaga, Hokkaido
- Kawayu Onsen in Tanabe, Wakayama

== See also ==
- Kawazu, Shizuoka
