= Izu-Atagawa Station =

Railway station in Higashiizu, Shizuoka Prefecture, Japan

Izu-Atagawa Station 伊豆熱川駅
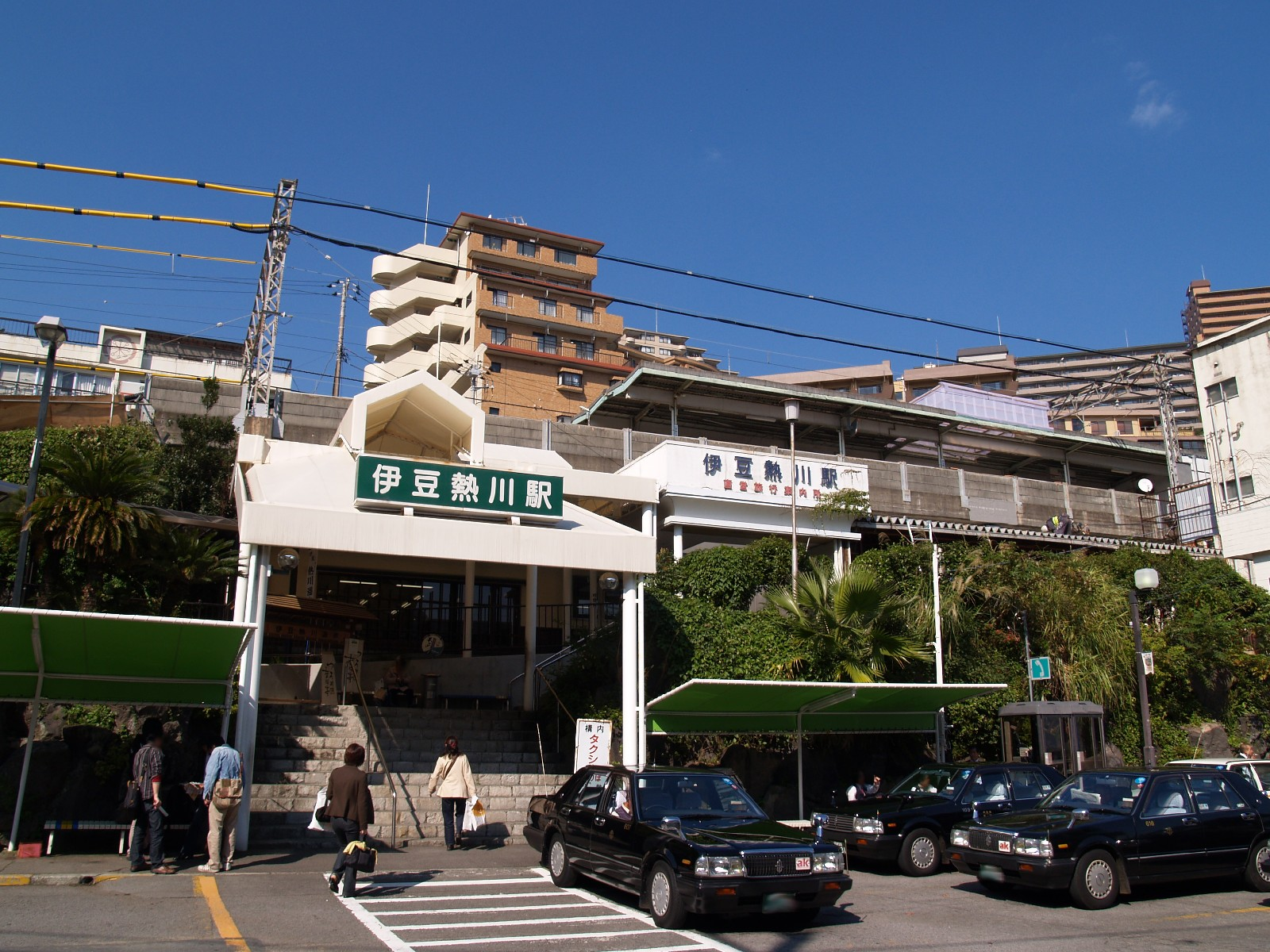
- Exterior of Izu-Atagawa Station

General information
- Location: Naramoto aza Hamada, Higashiizu-cho, Kamo-gun, Shizuoka-ken 413-0302; Japan
- Coordinates: 34°49′00″N 139°4′09″E
- Operator: Izukyū Corporation
- Line: ■ Izu Kyūkō Line
- Distance: 24.3 kilometers from Itō
- Platforms: 2 island platform

Other information
- Status: Staffed
- Station code: IZ09

History
- Opened: December 10, 1961.

Passengers
- FY2017: 519 daily
Location
- Location within Shizuoka Prefecture Location within Japan

Izu-Atagawa Station (伊豆熱川駅, Izu-Atagawa-eki) is a railway station in the town of Higashiizu, Shizuoka Prefecture, Japan, operated by the privately owned Izu Kyūkō Line.

== Lines ==
Izu-Atagawa Station is served by the Izu Kyūkō Line, and is located 24.3 kilometers from the official starting point of the line at Itō and is 31.2 kilometers from Atami.

== Station layout ==
Izu-Atagawa Station has one elevated island platform serving two tracks on an embankment. The station building is at a lower level to one side. The station is staffed.

=== Platforms ===
1	■ Izu Kyūkō Line	Izu-Inatori ・ Kawazu ・ Izukyū Shimoda
2	■ Izu Kyūkō Line	Itō ・ Izu-Kōgen ・ Atami・ Yokohama・ Tokyo

== Adjacent stations ==
«	Service	»
Izu Kyūkō Line
Izu-Kōgen	Limited Express	Izu-Inatori
Izu-Hokkawa	Local	Katase-Shirata

== History ==
Izu-Atagawa Station was opened on December 10, 1961.

== Passenger statistics ==
In fiscal 2017, the station was used by an average of 519 passengers daily (boarding passengers only).

== Surrounding area ==
- Atagawa Onsen
- Atagawa Tropical & Alligator Garden

== See also ==
- List of railway stations in Japan
