= Izukyū Shimoda Station =

Railway station in Shimoda, Shizuoka Prefecture, Japan

Izukyū-Shimoda Station 伊豆急下田駅
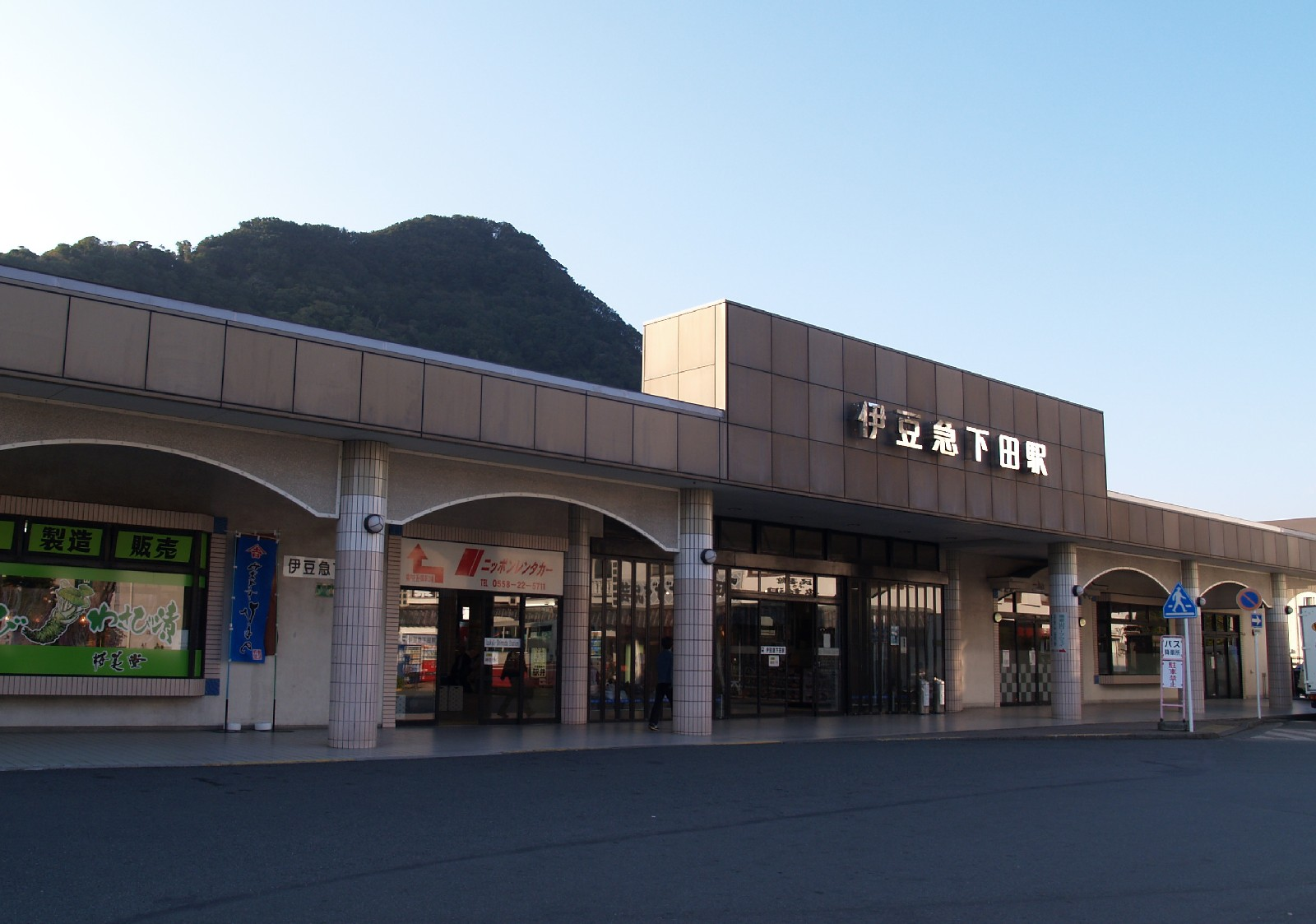
- Exterior of Izukyū-Shimoda Station in November 2008

General information
- Location: 1 Higashi Hongō, Shimoda-Shi, Shizuoka-ken; Japan
- Coordinates: 34°40′45″N 138°56′40″E
- Operator: Izukyū Corporation
- Line: ■ Izu Kyūkō Line
- Distance: 45.7 kilometers from Itō
- Platforms: 2 bay platforms

Other information
- Status: Staffed
- Station code: IZ16

History
- Opened: December 10, 1961.

Passengers
- FY2017: 1619 daily
Location
- Location within Shizuoka Prefecture Location within Japan

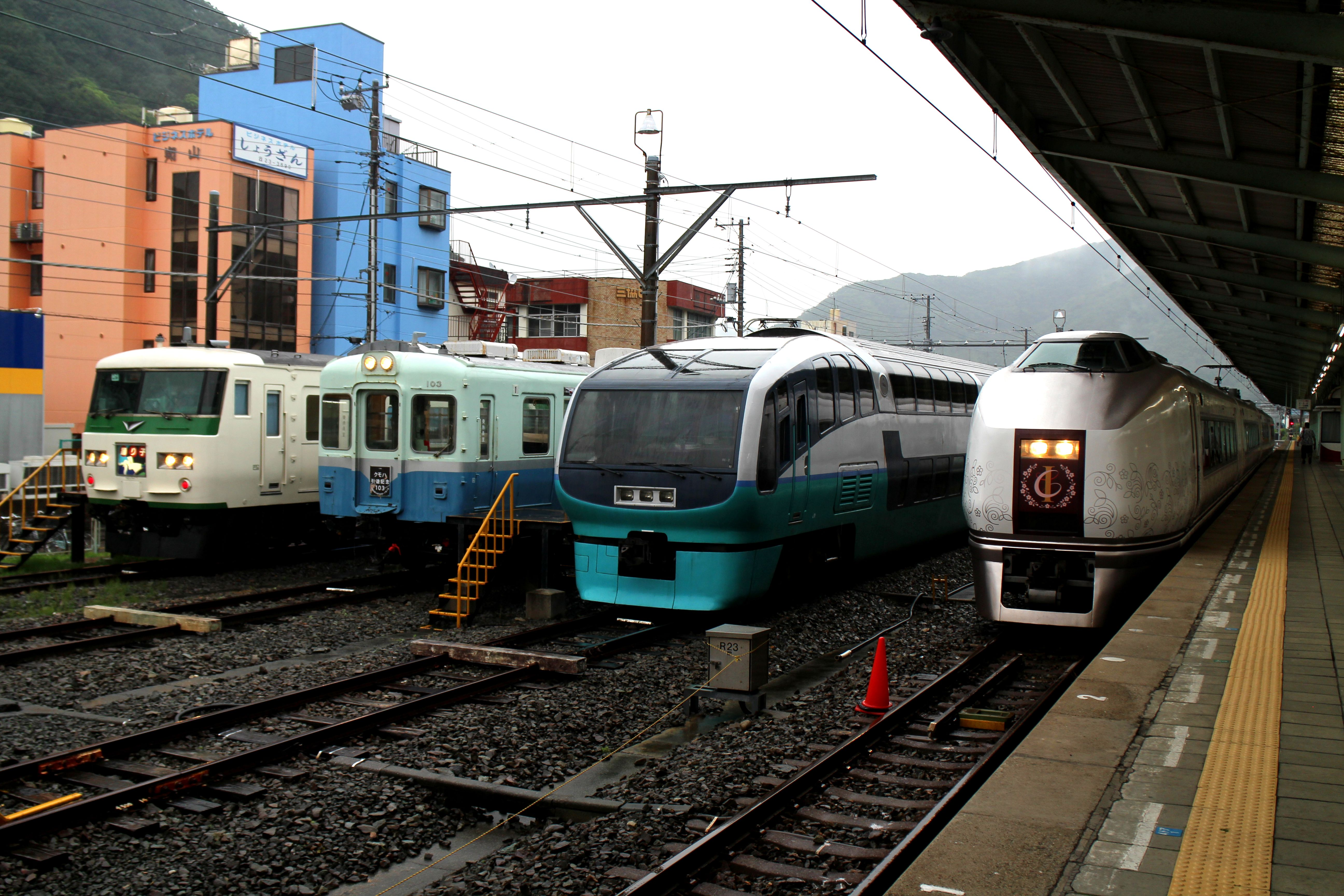
Platforms

Izukyū-Shimoda Station (伊豆急下田駅, Izukyū-Shimoda-eki) is a railway station in the city of Shimoda, Shizuoka, Japan, operated by the private railway operator Izukyū Corporation.

== Lines ==
Izukyū-Shimoda Station forms the southern terminus of the Izu Kyūkō Line, and is located 45.7 kilometers from the northern terminus of the line Itō and is 62.6 kilometers from Atami.

== Station layout ==
Izukyū-Shimoda Station has a double bay platform serving three tracks. Tracks 1 and 3 are used for normal train service, and Track 2 is used by the limited express Odoriko and Saphir ODORIKO. The station has a staffed ticket office.

=== Platforms ===
1	■ Izu Kyūkō Line	for Itō, Kawazu, Izu-Atagawa, Izu-Kōgen, and Atami
2	■ Limited Express Odoriko	for Atami, Yokohama, Tokyo, and Shinjuku
3	■ Izu Kyūkō Line	for Itō, Kawazu, Izu-Atagawa, Izu-Kōgen, and Atami

== Adjacent stations ==
«	Service	»
Izu Kyūkō Line
Kawazu	Limited Express	Terminus
Rendaiji	Local	Terminus

== History ==
Izukyū-Shimoda Station opened on December 10, 1961.

== Passenger statistics ==
In fiscal 2017, the station was used by an average of 1619 passengers daily (boarding passengers only).

== Surrounding area ==
- Shimoda Elementary School
- Shimoda Middle School
- Shimoda City Hall
- Shimoda Ropeway Shin-shimoda station (1 minute walk)

== See also ==
- List of railway stations in Japan
