= Izu-Kōgen Station =

Railway station in Itō, Shizuoka Prefecture, Japan

Izu Kōgen Station 伊豆高原駅
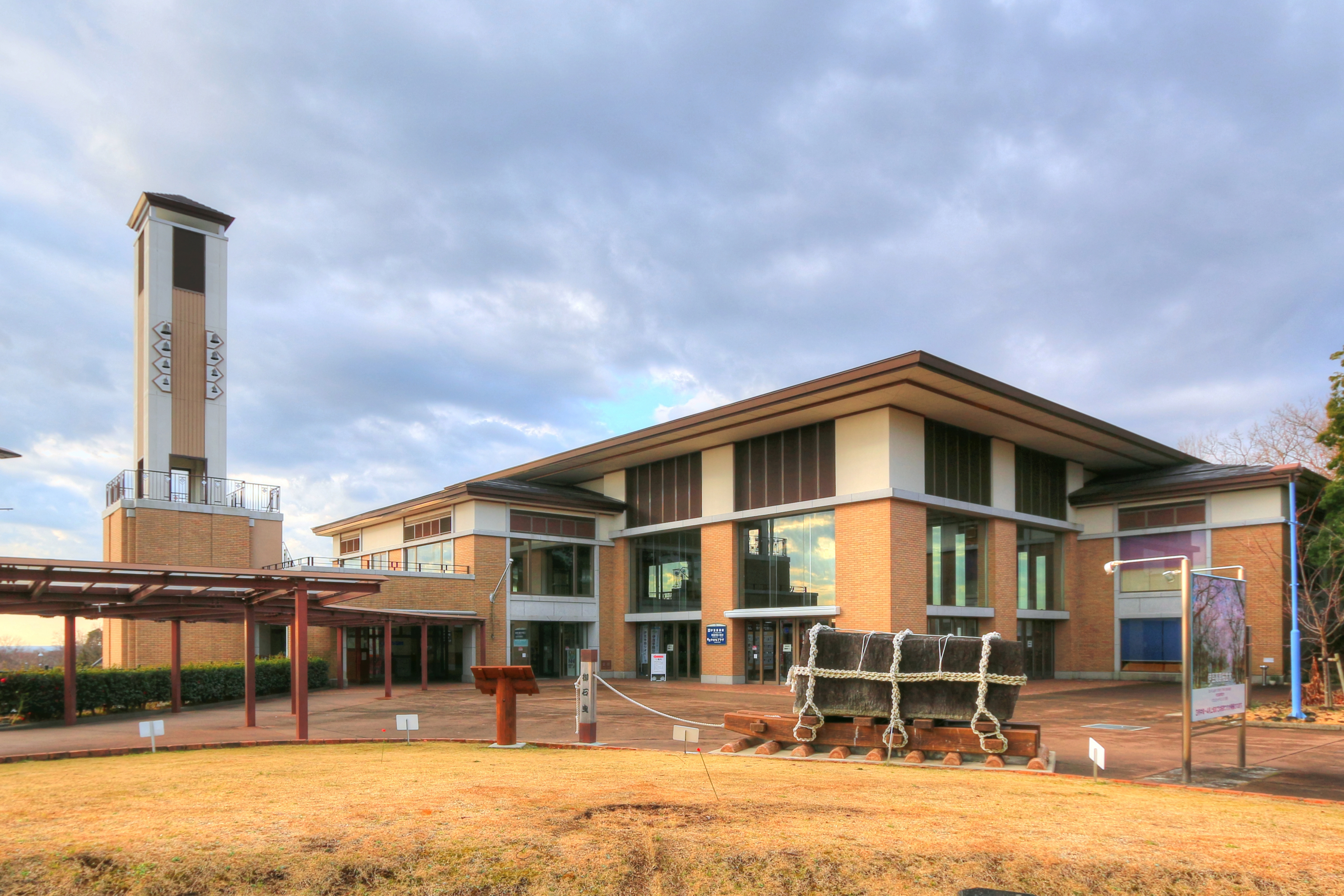
- The station entrance in February 2015

General information
- Location: Yawatano, Itō-shi, Shizuoka-ken 413-0232; Japan
- Coordinates: 34°52′41″N 139°6′29″E
- Operator: Izukyū Corporation
- Line: ■ Izu Kyūkō Line
- Distance: 15.9 kilometers from Itō
- Platforms: 1 island + 1 side platforms

Other information
- Status: Staffed
- Station code: IZ06
- Website: Official website

History
- Opened: December 10, 1961

Passengers
- FY2017: 1516 daily
Location
- Location within Shizuoka Prefecture Location within Japan

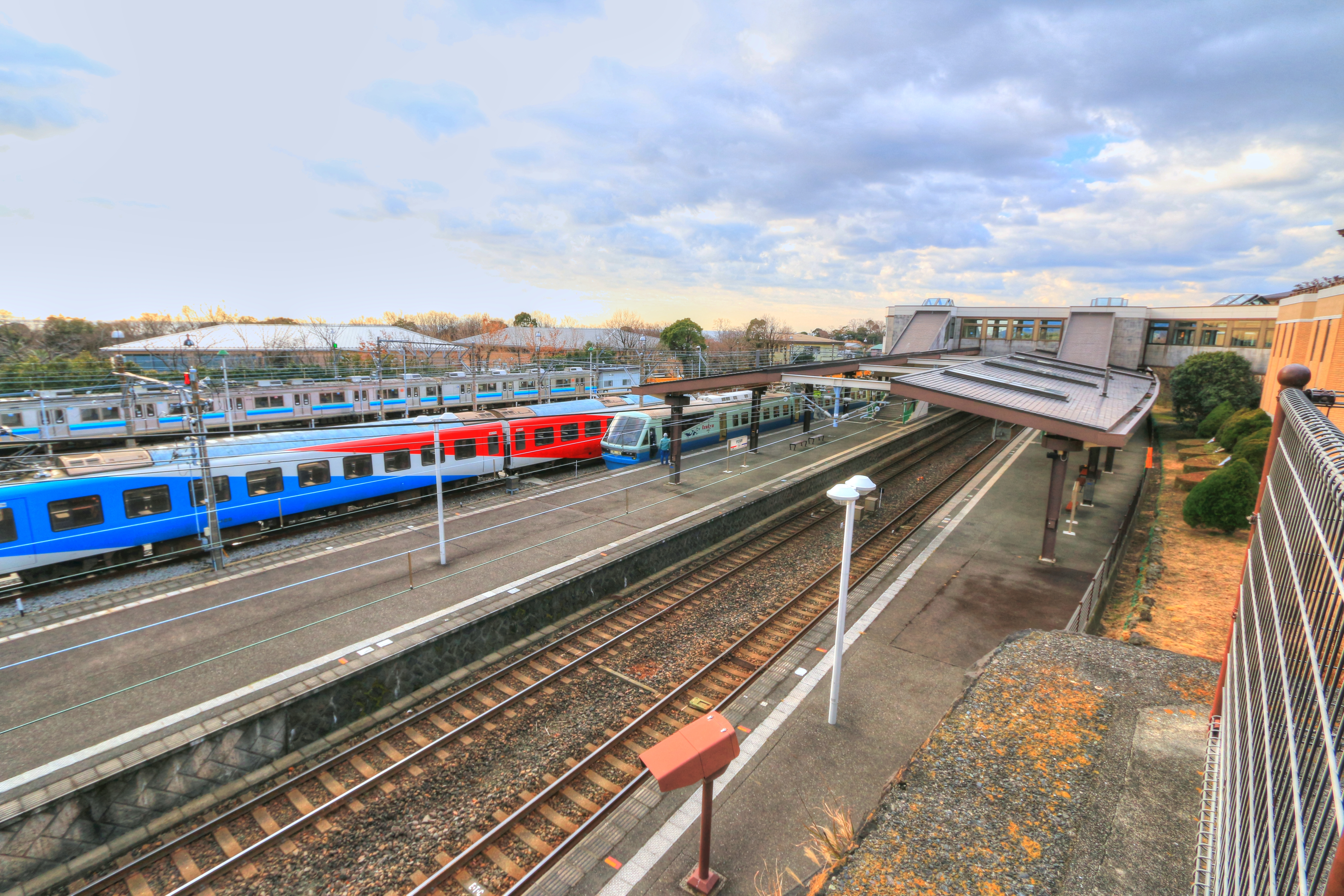
Panorama view

Izu-Kōgen Station (伊豆高原駅, Izu-Kōgen-eki) is a railway station located in the eastern part of Itō, Shizuoka Prefecture, Japan operated by the private railroad company Izukyū Corporation.

== Lines ==
Izu-Kōgen Station is served by the Izu Kyūkō Line, and is located 15.9 kilometers (9.9 mi) from the starting point of the line at Itō Station and 32.8 kilometers (20.4 mi) from Atami Station.

== Station layout ==
The station has a side platform and an island platform serving three tracks, connected to the station building with a footbridge. The station is staffed.

=== Platforms ===
1	■ Izu Kyūkō Line	for Izu-Atagawa, Izu-Inatori, Kawazu, and Izukyū Shimoda
2	■ Izu Kyūkō Line	for Izu-Atagawa, Izu-Inatori, Kawazu, and Izukyū Shimoda for Itō, Atami, Yokohama, and Tokyo
3	■ Izu Kyūkō Line	for Itō, Atami, Yokohama, and Tokyo

== Adjacent stations ==
«	Service	»
Izu Kyūkō Line
Itō	Limited Express	Izu-Atagawa
Jōgasaki-Kaigan	Local	Izu-Ōkawa

== History ==
Izu-Kōgen Station opened on December 10, 1961. The station is used to serve the people living in the nearby suburban homes, and it became a known major resort.

== Passenger statistics ==
In the fiscal year of 2017, the station was used by an average of 1516 passengers daily (boarding passengers only).

== In popular culture ==
Izu-Kōgen Station was featured on Episodes 4 & 5 on Season 12 (Hide + Seek: Japan) of the YouTube show Jet Lag: The Game, when hider Ben Doyle hid at the station and achieved a record score of 13 hours and 9 minutes.

== See also ==
- List of railway stations in Japan
