= Higashiizu =

Higashiizu 東伊豆町
- Town
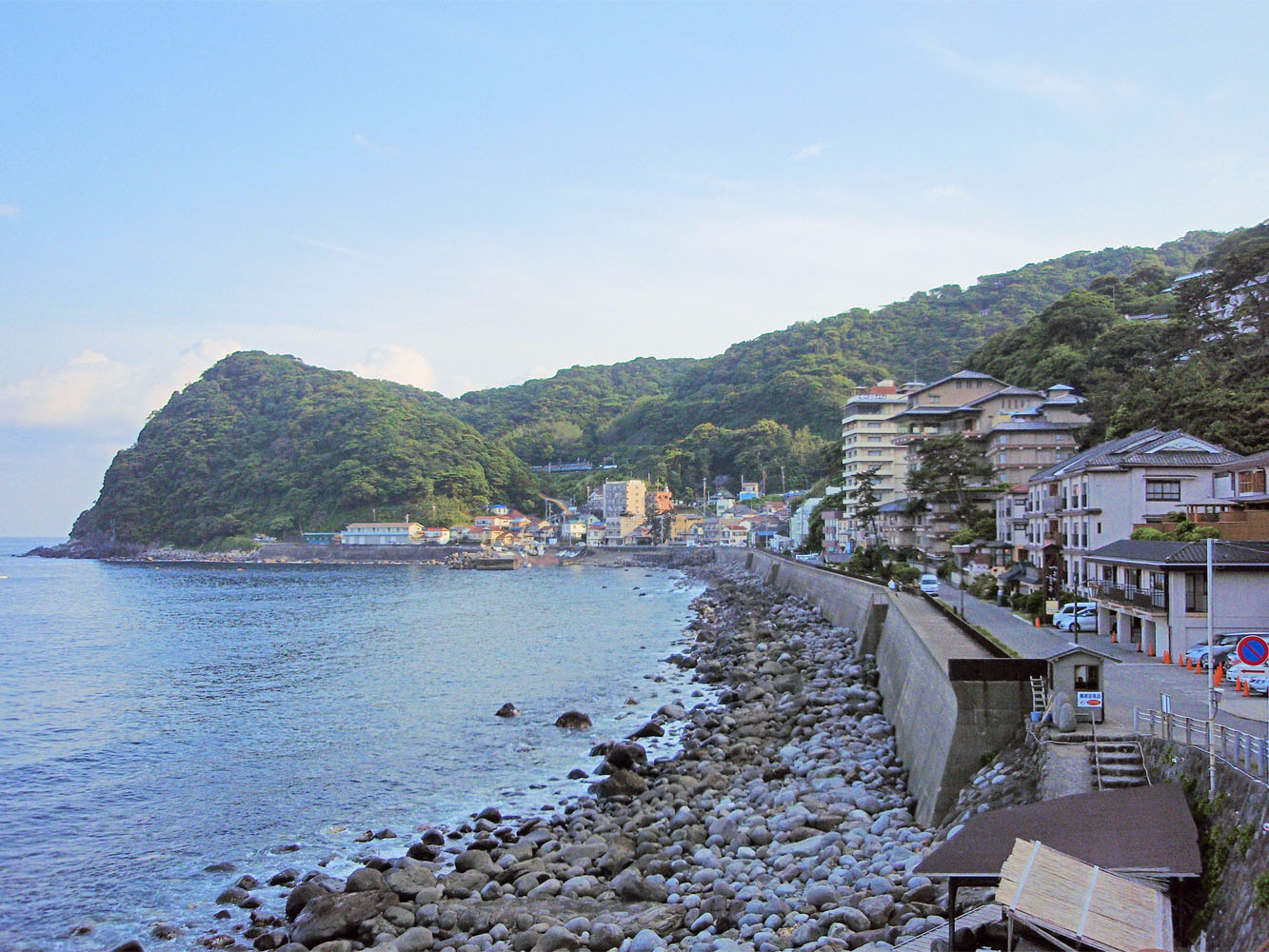
- Hokkawa Onsen in Higashiizu

- Flag Seal
- Interactive map of Higashiizu
- Coordinates: 34°46′N 139°2′E
- Country: Japan
- Region: Chūbu; Tōkai
- Prefecture: Shizuoka
- District: Kamo

Government
  - Mayor: Shigeki Iwai

Area
  - Total: 77.83 km^{2} (30.05 sq mi)

Population (June 30, 2019)
  - Total: 12,155
  - Density: 156.2/km^{2} (404.5/sq mi)
- Time zone: UTC+9 (Japan Standard Time)
- Phone number: 0557-95-1100
- Address: 3354 Inatori, Higashiizu-chō, Kamo-gun, Shizuoka-ken 413-0411
- Climate: Cfa
- Website: Official website
- Symbols
- Flower: Isobuki
- Tree: Sakura

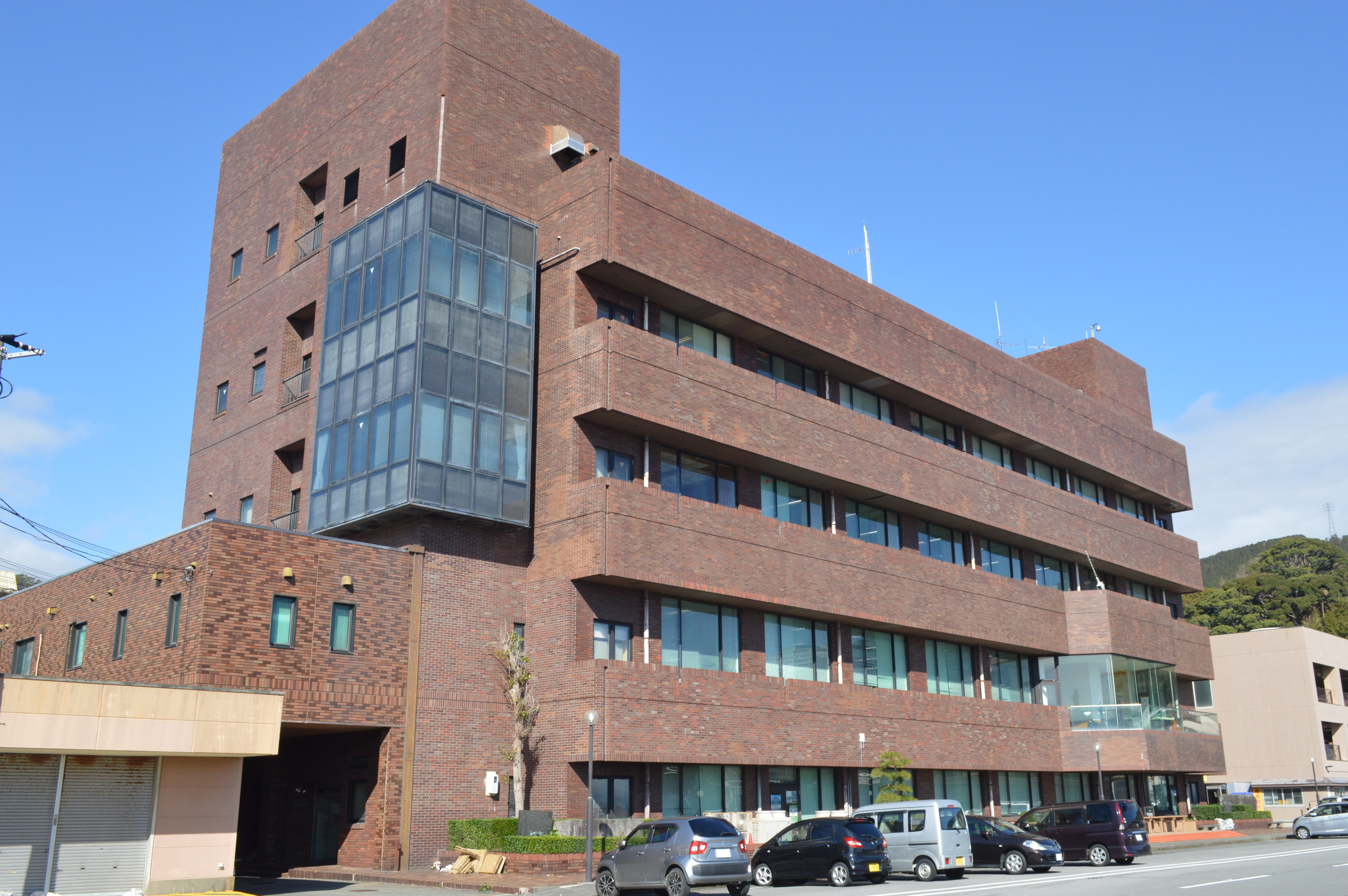
Higashiizu Town Hall

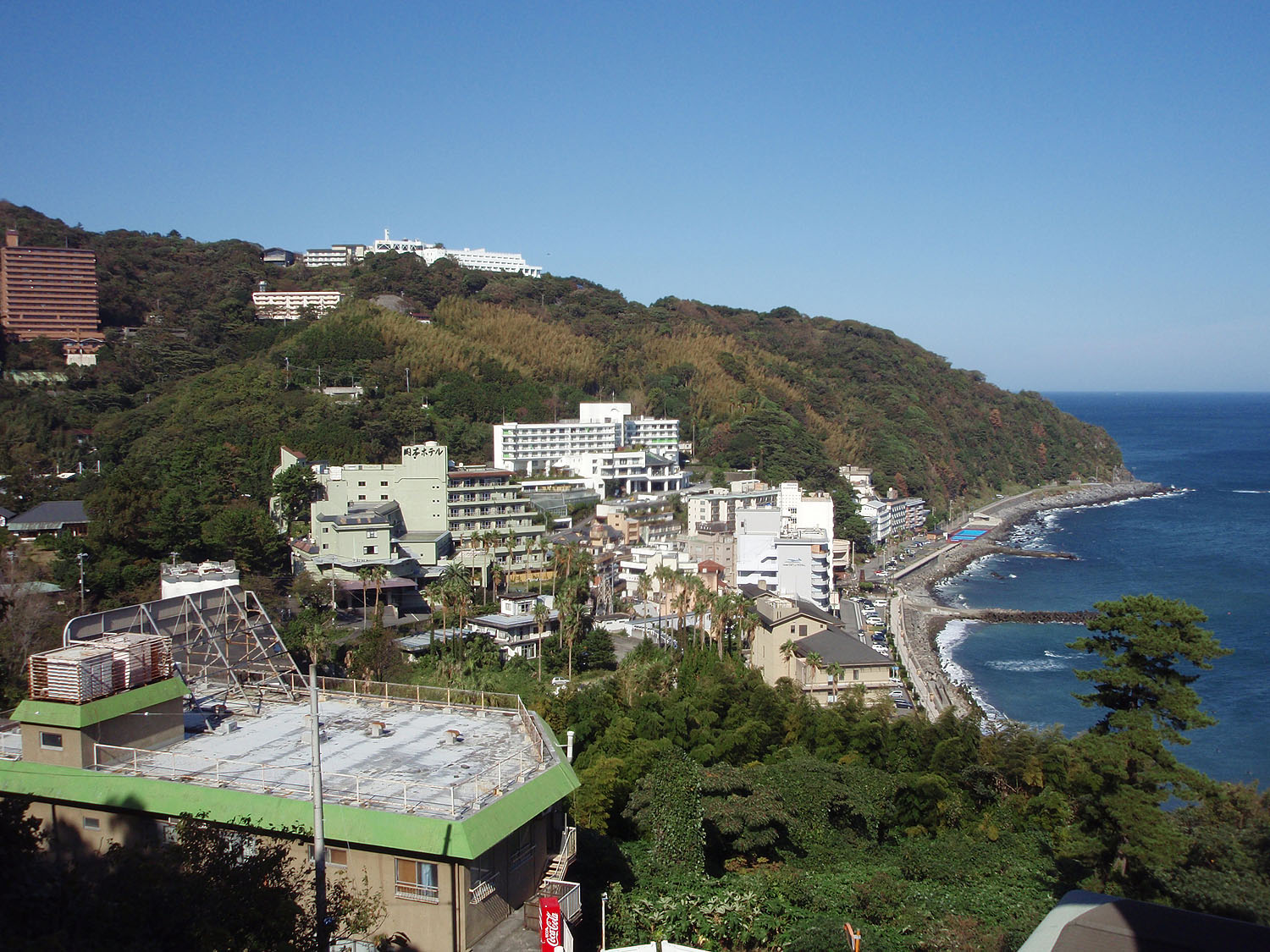
Atagawa Onsen in Higashiizu

Higashiizu (東伊豆町, Higashiizu-chō) is a town located in Kamo District, Shizuoka Prefecture, Japan. As of 30 June 2019, the town had an estimated population of 12,155 in 6,264 households, and a population density of 160 persons per km^{2}. The total area of the town is 77.83 square kilometres (30.05 sq mi).

== Geography ==
Sandwiched to the east and west between the Amagi Mountains and Sagami Bay on the Pacific Ocean, Higashiizu has numerous hot springs. Warmed by the warm Kuroshio Current, the area enjoys a warm maritime climate with hot, humid summers and mild, cool winters. Parts of the town are within the borders of Fuji-Hakone-Izu National Park.

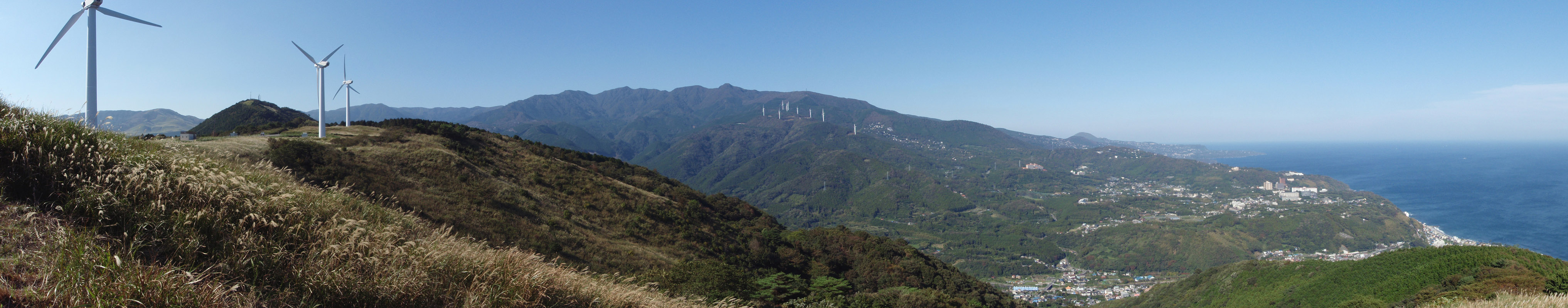
Mount Amagi seen from Higashiizu

=== Neighboring municipalities ===
- Itō
- Izu
- Kawazu

=== Demographics ===
Per Japanese census data, the population of Higashiizu has been in slow decline over the past 40 years.

Historical population
Year	Pop.	±%
1940	10,118	—
1950	13,310	+31.5%
1960	15,246	+14.5%
1970	16,220	+6.4%
1980	17,030	+5.0%
1990	16,719	−1.8%
2000	15,807	−5.5%
2010	14,065	−11.0%

=== Climate ===
The city has a climate characterized by hot and humid summers, and relatively mild winters (Köppen climate classification Cfa). The average annual temperature in Higashiizu is 16.2 °C (61.2 °F). The average annual rainfall is 2,357.6 mm (92.82 in) with June as the wettest month. The temperatures are highest on average in August, at around 26.0 °C (78.8 °F), and lowest in January, at around 6.9 °C (44.4 °F).

Climate data for Inatori, Higashiizu (1991−2020 normals, extremes 1978−present)
Month	Jan	Feb	Mar	Apr	May	Jun	Jul	Aug	Sep	Oct	Nov	Dec	Year
Record high °C (°F)	20.5 (68.9)	24.0 (75.2)	25.7 (78.3)	28.8 (83.8)	31.1 (88.0)	34.9 (94.8)	35.6 (96.1)	36.4 (97.5)	34.8 (94.6)	31.6 (88.9)	25.5 (77.9)	23.5 (74.3)	36.4 (97.5)
Mean daily maximum °C (°F)	10.6 (51.1)	11.2 (52.2)	13.9 (57.0)	18.2 (64.8)	22.0 (71.6)	24.4 (75.9)	28.3 (82.9)	29.7 (85.5)	26.5 (79.7)	21.8 (71.2)	17.4 (63.3)	13.0 (55.4)	19.8 (67.6)
Daily mean °C (°F)	6.9 (44.4)	7.2 (45.0)	10.0 (50.0)	14.2 (57.6)	18.1 (64.6)	21.0 (69.8)	24.8 (76.6)	26.0 (78.8)	23.2 (73.8)	18.7 (65.7)	14.1 (57.4)	9.5 (49.1)	16.1 (61.1)
Mean daily minimum °C (°F)	3.9 (39.0)	4.0 (39.2)	6.5 (43.7)	10.7 (51.3)	14.9 (58.8)	18.4 (65.1)	22.2 (72.0)	23.4 (74.1)	20.8 (69.4)	16.2 (61.2)	11.4 (52.5)	6.5 (43.7)	13.2 (55.8)
Record low °C (°F)	−2.8 (27.0)	−4.1 (24.6)	−0.9 (30.4)	1.6 (34.9)	7.2 (45.0)	12.2 (54.0)	14.7 (58.5)	17.7 (63.9)	13.3 (55.9)	8.2 (46.8)	2.8 (37.0)	−1.6 (29.1)	−4.1 (24.6)
Average precipitation mm (inches)	87.1 (3.43)	123.7 (4.87)	208.1 (8.19)	236.8 (9.32)	222.9 (8.78)	298.1 (11.74)	281.8 (11.09)	183.8 (7.24)	249.8 (9.83)	227.1 (8.94)	153.8 (6.06)	84.7 (3.33)	2,357.6 (92.82)
Average precipitation days (≥ 1.0 mm)	6.8	7.3	11.0	10.7	11.1	13.6	11.9	8.8	11.8	11.2	8.8	7.3	120.3
Mean monthly sunshine hours	189.4	180.5	182.9	194.0	192.1	130.1	165.8	218.8	167.9	161.1	167.1	189.5	2,139.1
Source: Japan Meteorological Agency

== History ==
During the Edo period, all of Izu Province was tenryō territory under direct control of the Tokugawa shogunate, and the area now comprising Higashiizu Town consisted of 5 villages (Inatori, Naramoto, Shirata, Katase, and Ōkawa). With the establishment of the modern municipalities system in the early Meiji period in 1889, the area was reorganized into two villages (Inatori and Jōtō) with Kamo District. Inatori was elevated in status of that of a town in December 1920. The town of Higashiizu was founded on May 3, 1959, through the merger of the town of Inatori with the village of Jōtō.

== Economy ==
The economy of Higashiizu is dominated by tourism centered on the hot spring resort industry, and by commercial fishing.

== Education ==
Higashiizu has three public elementary schools and two public junior high schools operated by the town government, and one public high school operated by the Shizuoka Prefectural Board of Education.

== Transportation ==
=== Railway ===
- - Izu Kyūkō Line
  - Izu-Ōkawa - Izu-Hokkawa - Izu-Atagawa - Katase-Shirata - Izu-Inatori

=== Highway ===
- National Route 135

== Local attractions ==
- Atagawa Tropical & Alligator Garden
- Shimokamo Tropical Botanical Gardens
