= Shimoda Ropeway =

Coordinates: 34°40′45″N 138°57′6″E

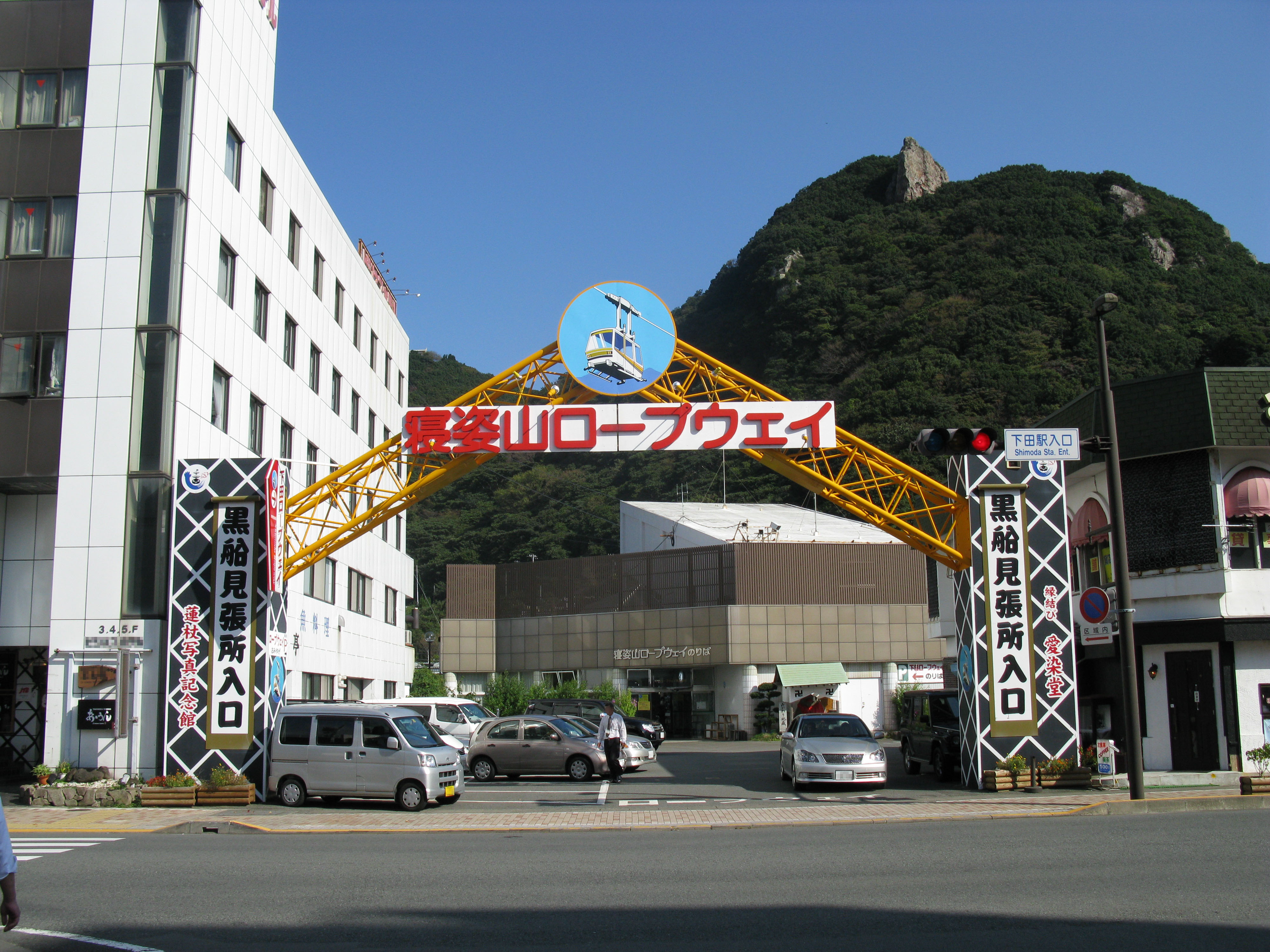
Shimoda Station of the Shimoda Ropeway

Shimoda ropeway from above, 2023

The Shimoda Ropeway (下田ロープウェイ, Shimoda Rōpuwei) is the name of a Japanese aerial lift line in Shimoda, Shizuoka, as well as its operator. The company is a subsidiary of Izukyū Corporation, a Tokyu Group company. The line is also called Nesugatayama Ropeway (寝姿山ロープウェイ, Nesugatayama Rōpuwei), as it climbs Mount Nesugata. The observatory has a view of Port of Shimoda and Pacific Ocean. The line began operation on April 1, 1961.

== Basic data ==
- System: Aerial tramway, 3 cables
- Cable length: 540 m (1,772 ft)
- Vertical interval: 156 m (512 ft)
- Maximum gradient: 26°49′
- Operational speed: 3.6 m/s
- Passenger capacity per a cabin: 40
- Cabins: 2
- Stations: 2
- Duration of one-way trip: 3 minutes 30 seconds

== See also ==
- Izu Kyūkō Line
- List of aerial lifts in Japan
