= Izu Kyūkō Line =

Railway line in Shizuoka prefecture, Japan

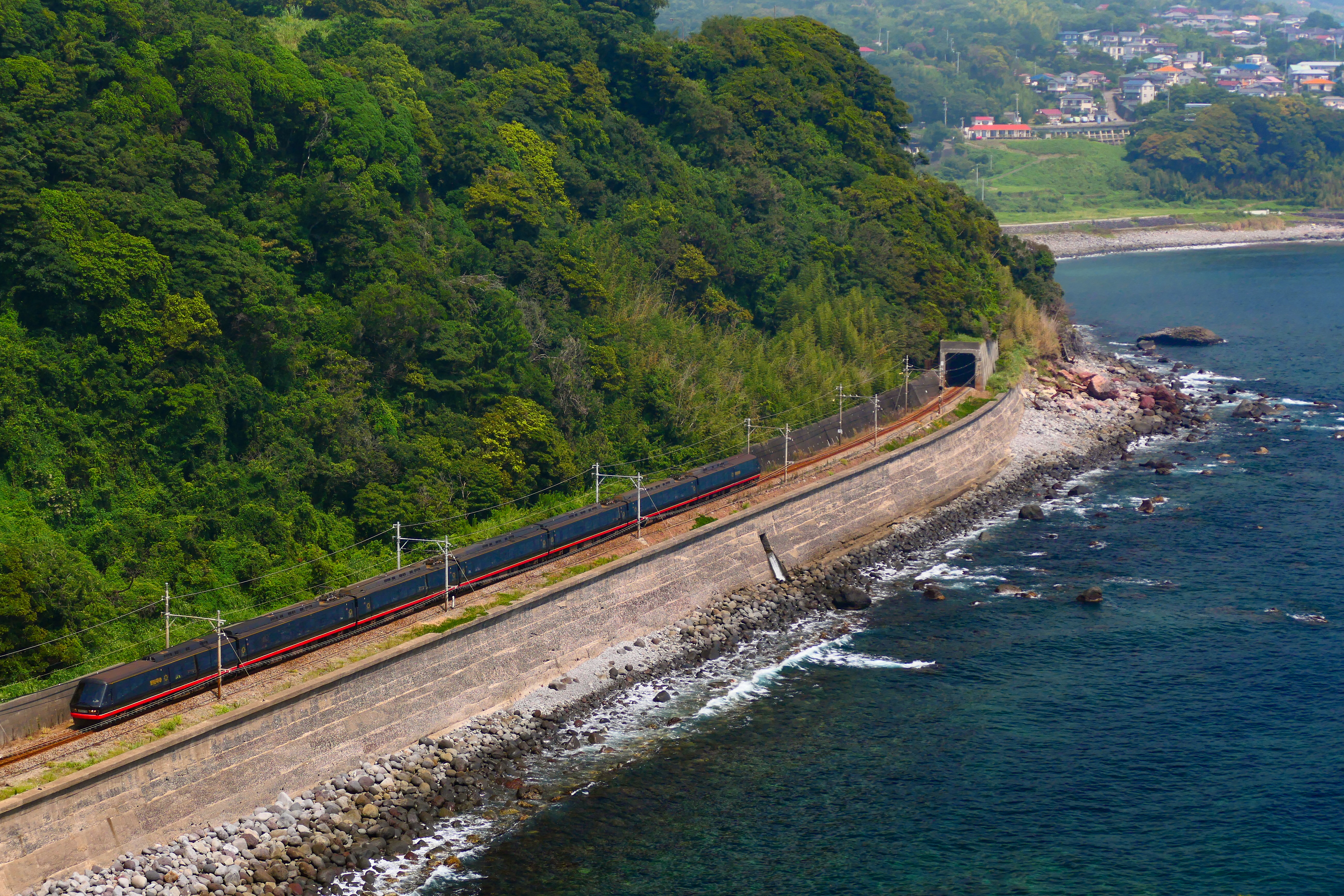
- Resort 21 train on Izu Peninsula coast

Overview
- Locale: Shizuoka Prefecture, Japan
- Termini: Izukyū-Shimoda; Itō
- Stations: 16

Service
- Type: Heavy rail
- Operator: Izukyū Corporation

History
- Opened: 1961; 65 years ago

Technical
- Line length: 45.7 km (28.4 mi)
- Track gauge: 1,067 mm (3 ft 6 in)
- Electrification: 1,500 V DC overhead
Route map

The Izu Kyūkō Line (Japanese: 伊豆急行線, romanized: Izu Kyūkō-sen) is a privately owned railway line of the Izukyū Corporation in Shizuoka Prefecture, Japan.

The line approximately parallels the eastern coast of the Izu Peninsula, a tourist district noted for its numerous hot spring resorts, and golf courses, between Itō Station in Itō and Izukyū Shimoda Station in Shimoda. The line opened in 1961.

Since March 13, 2010, PASMO and Suica cards are accepted on the line.

== Basic data ==
- Track: single
- Signalling: Automatic (ATS-Si, compatible with East Japan Railway Company (JR East) ATS-SN.)

== History ==
Initial plans called for the Japanese National Railways (JNR) to build a spur line linking Atami on the Tōkaidō Main Line with Shimoda. However, funding was limited in the 1930s due to a combination of a tight fiscal policy under Prime Minister Osachi Hamaguchi during the Great Depression, and a number of technical issues.

On March 30, 1935, the initial 8.7 km section of the Itō Line linking Atami with Ajiro was opened. The second (8.3 km) section from Ajiro to Itō was opened on December 15, 1938. Both sections were electrified at 1500 VDC when opened. Further work was delayed, and then canceled due to the outbreak of World War II.

Construction south of Itō resumed when the private-sector Tokyu Corporation acquired the rights to complete the line to Shimoda and established the Izukyū Corporation to manage construction and operations of this section. The line to Shimoda opened in 1961.

== Operation ==
The northern terminal station for the Izu Kyūkō Line is at Ito Station, from which local trains depart for the southern terminal station of Izukyū-Shimoda. However, several varieties of limited express trains operated by JR East originate at Tokyo Station travel via the Itō Line tracks to Ito, and then terminate at Izukyū-Shimoda. These include the Odoriko and Super View Odoriko named trains. Similarly, the Resort Odoriko operated by the Izu Kyūkō Line also makes the same run, but using different rolling stock.

== Station list ==
No.	Station Name	Japanese	Distance from Itō (km)	Transfers	Location	
No.	Station Name	Japanese	Distance from Itō (km)	Transfers	Town/City	Prefecture
IZ01	Itō	伊東	0.0	Itō Line	Itō	Shizuoka
IZ02	Minami-Itō	南伊東	2.0		Itō	Shizuoka
IZ03	Kawana	川奈	6.1		Itō	Shizuoka
IZ04	Futo	富戸	11.5		Itō	Shizuoka
IZ05	Jōgasaki-Kaigan	城ヶ崎海岸	13.9		Itō	Shizuoka
IZ06	Izu-Kōgen	伊豆高原	15.9		Itō	Shizuoka
IZ07	Izu-Ōkawa	伊豆大川	20.9		Kamo District, Higashiizu	Shizuoka
IZ08	Izu-Hokkawa	伊豆北川	22.9		Kamo District, Higashiizu	Shizuoka
IZ09	Izu-Atagawa	伊豆熱川	24.3		Kamo District, Higashiizu	Shizuoka
IZ10	Katase-Shirata	片瀬白田	26.1		Kamo District, Higashiizu	Shizuoka
IZ11	Izu-Inatori	伊豆稲取	30.3		Kamo District, Higashiizu	Shizuoka
IZ12	Imaihama-Kaigan	今井浜海岸	34.2		Kamo District, Kawazu	Shizuoka
IZ13	Kawazu	河津	35.3		Kamo District, Kawazu	Shizuoka
IZ14	Inazusa	稲梓	40.7		Shimoda	Shizuoka
IZ15	Rendaiji	蓮台寺	43.4		Shimoda	Shizuoka
IZ16	Izukyū Shimoda	伊豆急下田	45.7		Shimoda	Shizuoka

== Rolling stock ==
=== Current ===
- Izukyu 2100 series
- Izukyu 8000 series
- Izukyu 3000 series (former JR East 209-2000/2100 series)
- JR East E257-2000/2500 series

=== Former ===
- 185 series
- 251 series

== See also ==
- List of railway lines in Japan
