= Itō, Shizuoka =

Itō 伊東市
- City
- Aerial view of Itō

- Flag Seal

- Location of Itō in Shizuoka Prefecture

- Coordinates: 34°57′56.6″N 139°06′6.7″E
- Country: Japan
- Region: Chūbu (Tōkai)
- Prefecture: Shizuoka
- First official recorded: 680 AD
- City settled: August 10, 1947

Government
  - Mayor: Kazuya Sugimoto (since December 2025)

Area
  - Total: 124.10 km^{2} (47.92 sq mi)

Population (August 1, 2023)
  - Total: 63,343
  - Density: 510.42/km^{2} (1,322.0/sq mi)
- Time zone: UTC+9 (Japan Standard Time)
  - Tree: Camellia
  - Flower: Camellia
  - Bird: Blue Rock-thrush
- Phone number: 0557-36-0111
- Address: 2-1-1 Ōhara, Ito-shi, Shizuoka-ken 414-8555
- Website: Official website

View of Itō, 2022

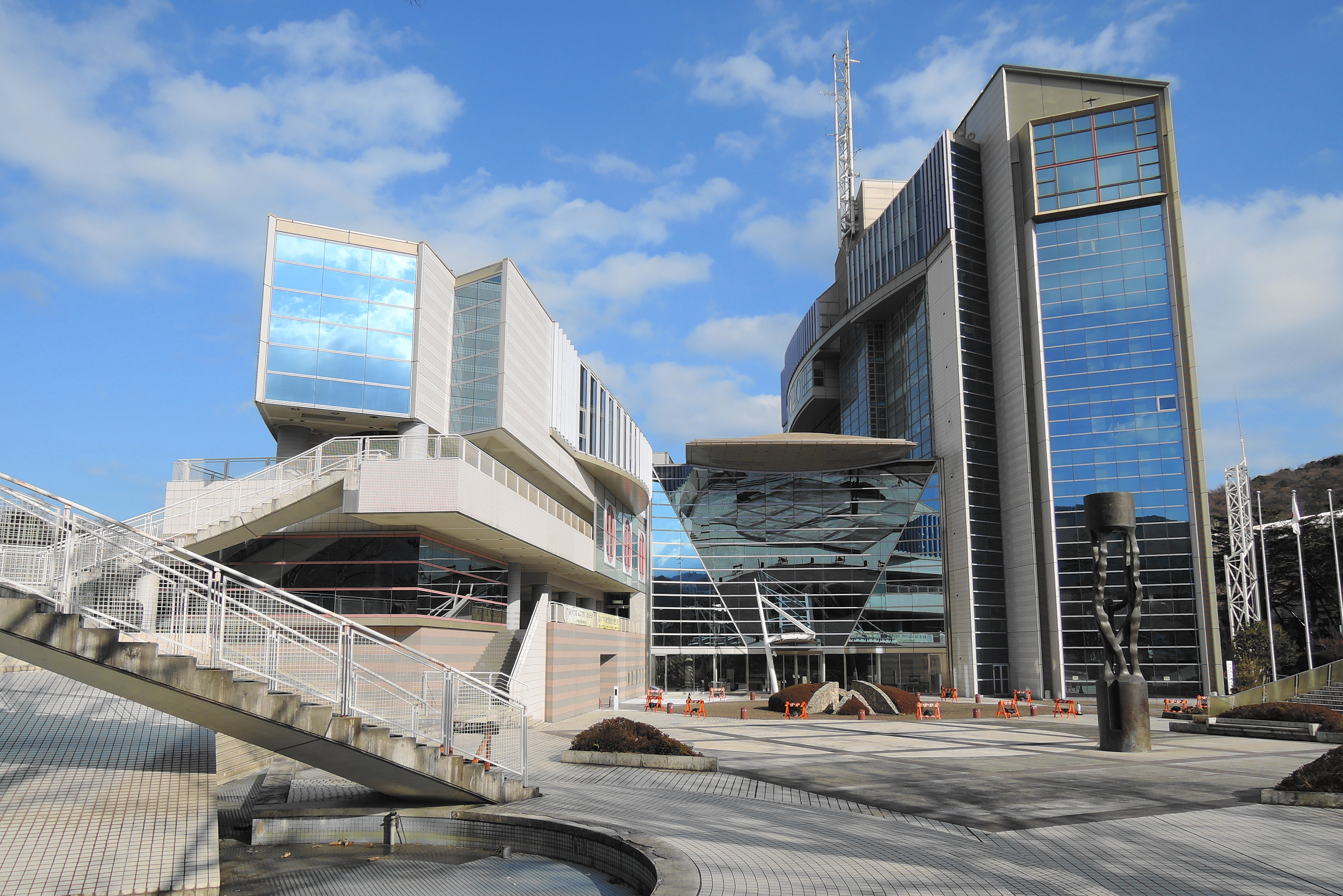
Itō City Hall

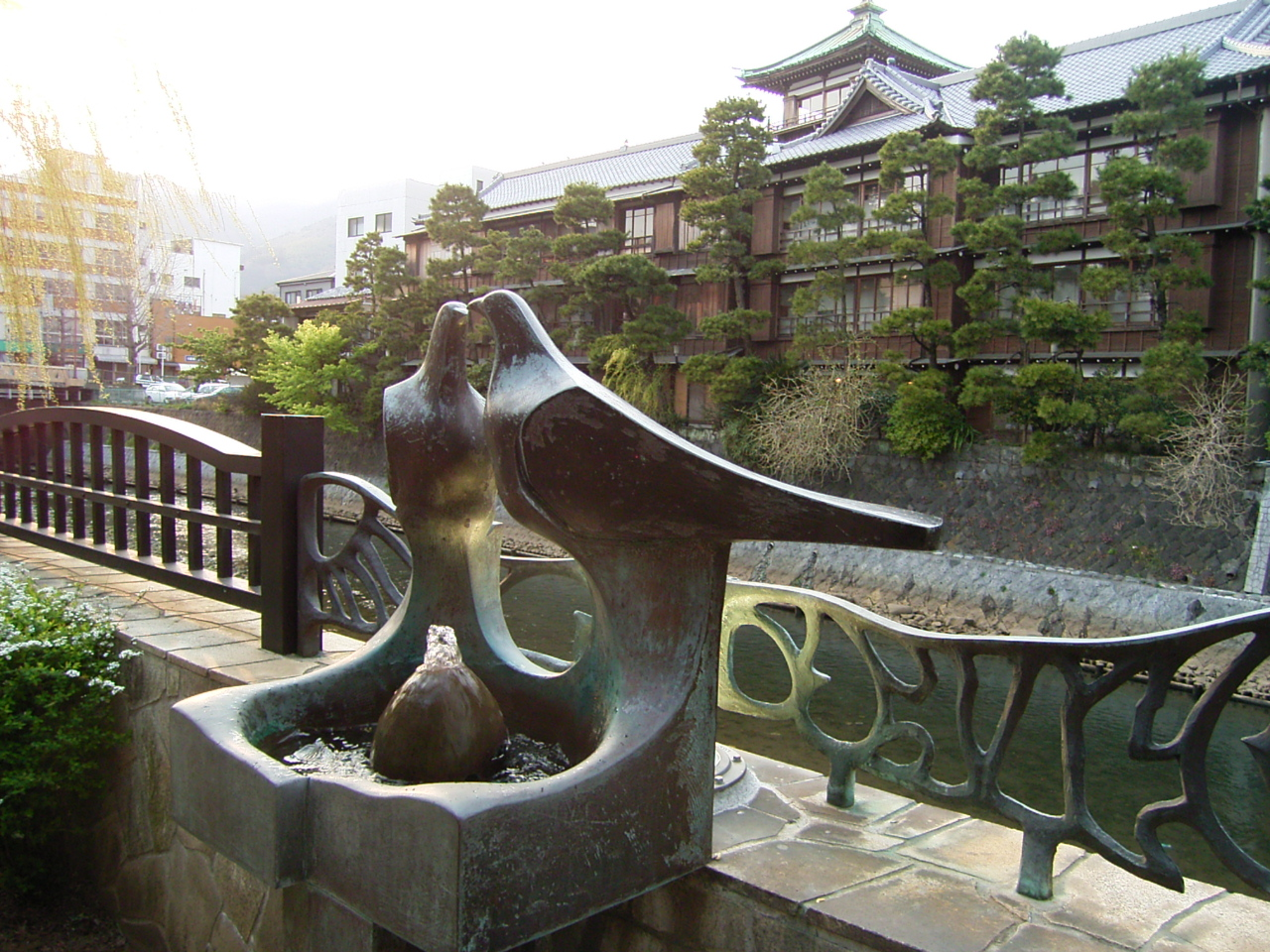
onsen(Toukaikan)

Itō (伊東市, Itō-shi; Japanese pronunciation: [ì.tó̞ó̞, -tó̞ò̞.ɕì]) is a city located on the eastern shore of the Izu Peninsula in Shizuoka Prefecture, Japan. As of 1 August 2023, the city had an estimated population of 63,343 and a population density of 510 persons per square kilometer. The total area was 124.13 square kilometres (47.93 sq mi).

== Geography ==
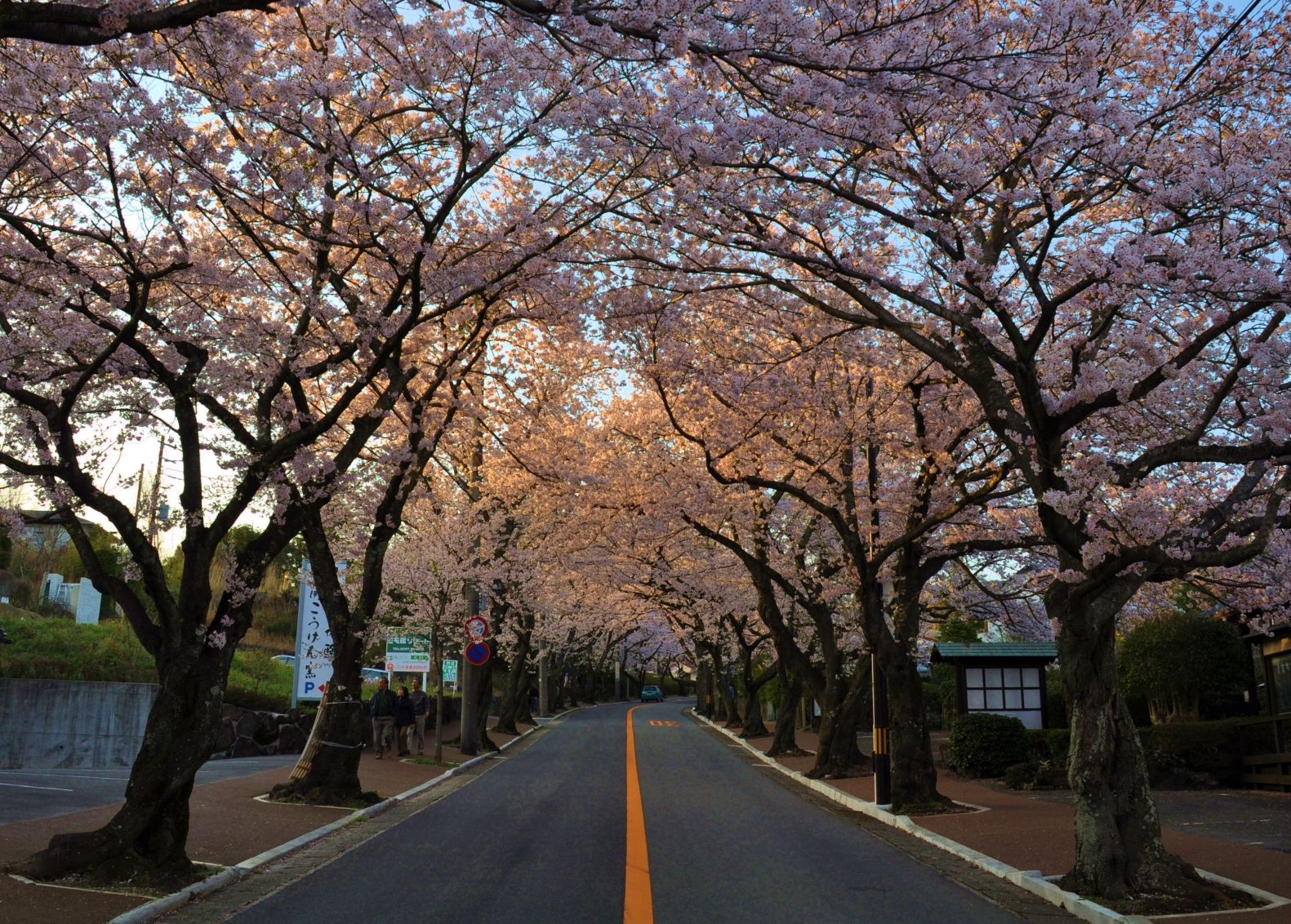
Cherry trees street at Izu-kogen

Itō is located in eastern Shizuoka Prefecture, on the northeast corner of Izu Peninsula, facing Sagami Bay on the Pacific Ocean. The landscape is hilly, and the heavily indented coastline is scenic. Much of the coastal area of the city is within the Fuji-Hakone-Izu National Park, and due to this, the city is noted for its onsen hot springs with many hotels and resorts. It is located within the Izu-Tobu volcanic zone. Due to its proximity to the Tokyo metropolis and ease of transportation, it has been noted as the most visited national park in all Japan.

=== Surrounding municipalities ===
Shizuoka Prefecture

- Atami
- Higashiizu
- Izu
- Izunokuni

== Demographics ==
Per Japanese census data, the population of Itō peaked in around the year 2000.

Historical population
Year	Pop.	±%
1940	33,884	—
1950	48,533	+43.2%
1960	54,564	+12.4%
1970	63,003	+15.5%
1980	69,638	+10.5%
1990	71,223	+2.3%
2000	71,720	+0.7%
2023	63,343	−11.7%

=== Climate ===
The city has a climate characterized by hot and humid summers, and relatively mild winters (Köppen climate classification Cfa). The average annual temperature in Itō is 14.8 °C (58.6 °F). The average annual rainfall is 2,200 millimetres (87 in) with September as the wettest month. The temperatures are highest on average in August, at around 25.1 °C (77.2 °F), and lowest in January, at around 5.3 °C (41.5 °F).

== History ==
During the Edo period, all of Izu Province was tenryō territory under direct control of the Tokugawa shogunate, and the area now comprising Itō was occupied by 15 small farming and fishing hamlets. It was in this area that the Tokugawa shogunate ordered Englishman William Adams to construct Japan's first western-style sailing vessels in 1604. The first ship, an 80 metric tons (79 long tons; 88 short tons) vessel, was used for surveying work, and the second ship, the 120 metric tons (120 long tons; 130 short tons) San Buena Ventura was sailed to Mexico. The period is commemorated in Itō by a street named after Adams (Anjinmiuradori). The area was reorganized into four villages (Tsushima, Itō, Komuro and Usami) within Kamo District with the establishment of the modern municipalities system in the early Meiji period in 1889, and was transferred to Tagata District in 1896.

On January 1, 1906, the village of Itō was elevated to town status. The 1923 Great Kantō earthquake caused damage in Itō with a 5 meter high tsunami. Train services started in 1938. It annexed neighboring Komuro Village on August 10, 1947, and became the city of Itō. In 1950 Itō was proclaimed an "International Tourism and Cultural City" by the central government. It further expanded through annexation of neighboring Tsushima and Usami villages on April 1, 1955. Izu-Kōgen Station opened on December 10, 1961, which helped promote tourism to the local resort area.

== Government ==
Itō has a mayor-council form of government with a directly elected mayor and a unicameral city legislature of 20 members. The city contributes one member to the Shizuoka Prefectural Assembly.

== Economy ==
Itō is one of the well known hot spring resort towns near the greater Tokyo metropolis, thus tourism is the mainstay of the economy. Commercial fishing and the production of stockfish form a secondary economy. Itō has a fishing commercial harbour as well as the popular Michi no Eki Itō Marine Town rest area with a yacht harbour, along the coast along Road 135.

== Education ==
Itō has ten public elementary schools and five public middle schools operated by the city government and two public high schools operated by the Shizuoka Prefectural Board of Education. In addition, the prefecture also operates one special education school for the disabled.

== Transportation ==
=== Railway ===
- East Japan Railway Company – Itō Line
  - Itō – Usami
- Izukyu Corporation – Izu Kyūkō Line
  - Itō – Minami-Itō – Kawana – Futo – Jōgasaki-Kaigan – Izu-Kōgen

=== Highways ===
- National Route 135

== Sister cities ==
- Suwa, Nagano prefecture, Japan, since May 20, 1965
- Medway, United Kingdom, since August 10, 1982
- Rieti, Italy, since July 21, 1985
- Ismayilli, Azerbaijan, since 2013

== Local attractions ==
- Akazawa Onsen
- Itō Onsen
- Jōgasaki Coast
- Mount Ōmuro
- Usami Onsen

== Notable people from Itō ==
- Ryuji Hara – professional boxer
- Mokutaro Kinoshita – author
- Ichiro Ogimura – table tennis player, coach, president of the ITTF and former World No. 1 who won 12 World Championship titles during his career
- Eiji Tsuburaya – Japanese special effects director responsible for many Japanese science-fiction films and television series, co-creator of Godzilla and the creator of Ultra Series (Originally from Sukagawa, Fukushima, resided in Itō until his death)

== Itō in media ==
- Itō is featured extensively in the manga Amanchu! by Kozue Amano.
- Itō is where the aquatic battle between unit Eva-02 and one enemy angel in the anime Neon Genesis Evangelion takes place under the ocean.
- In the manga Inuyasha, the protagonist Kagome Higurashi's home is based on the real Higurashi Shrine located in Itō.
