= Kawazu, Shizuoka =

Town in Izu Peninsula, Japan

Kawazu 河津町
- Town
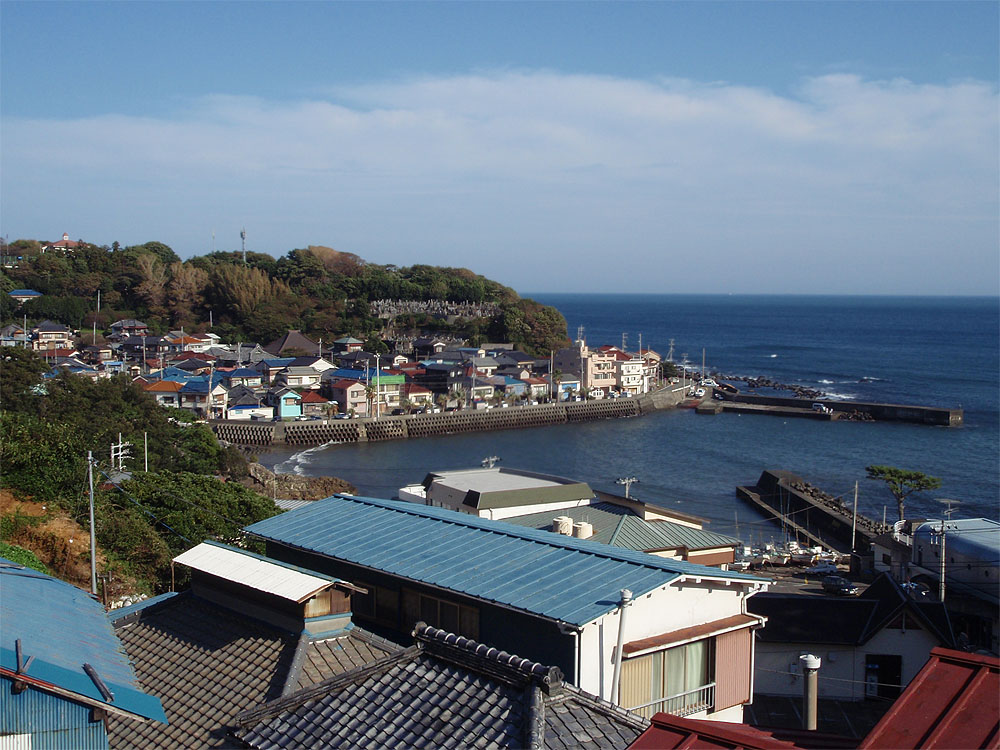
- Midaka district, Kawazu Town

- Flag Seal
- Interactive map of Kawazu
- Coordinates: 34°45′N 138°59′E
- Country: Japan
- Region: Chūbu; Tōkai
- Prefecture: Shizuoka
- District: Kamo

Area
  - Total: 100.79 km^{2} (38.92 sq mi)

Population (August 2019)
  - Total: 7,203
  - Density: 71.47/km^{2} (185.1/sq mi)
- Time zone: UTC+9 (Japan Standard Time)
- Tree: Sakura
- Flower: Japanese iris
- Phone number: 0558-34-1913
- Address: 静岡県賀茂郡河津町田中212-2; 413-0595
- Website: Official website

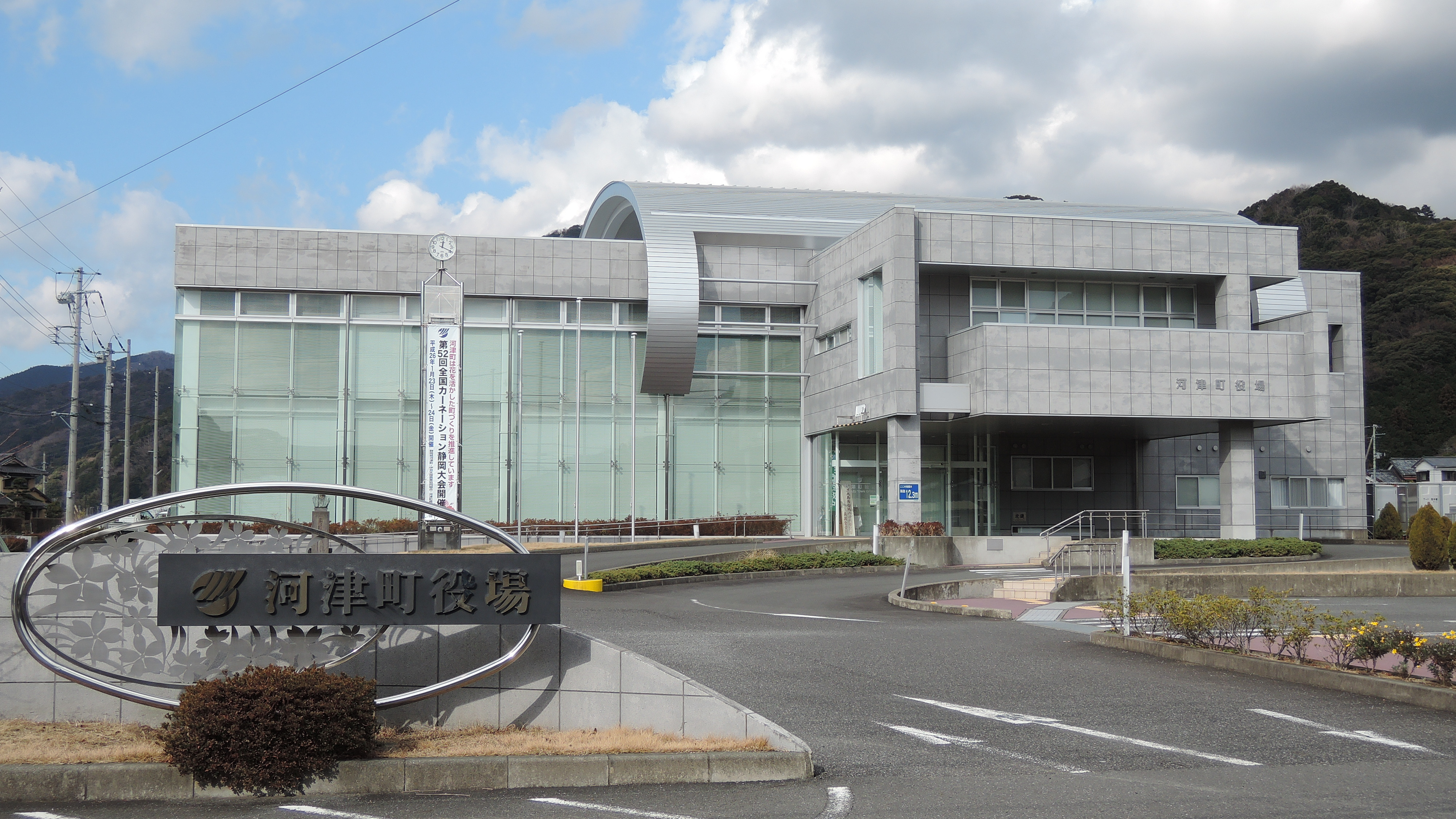
Kawazu Town Hall

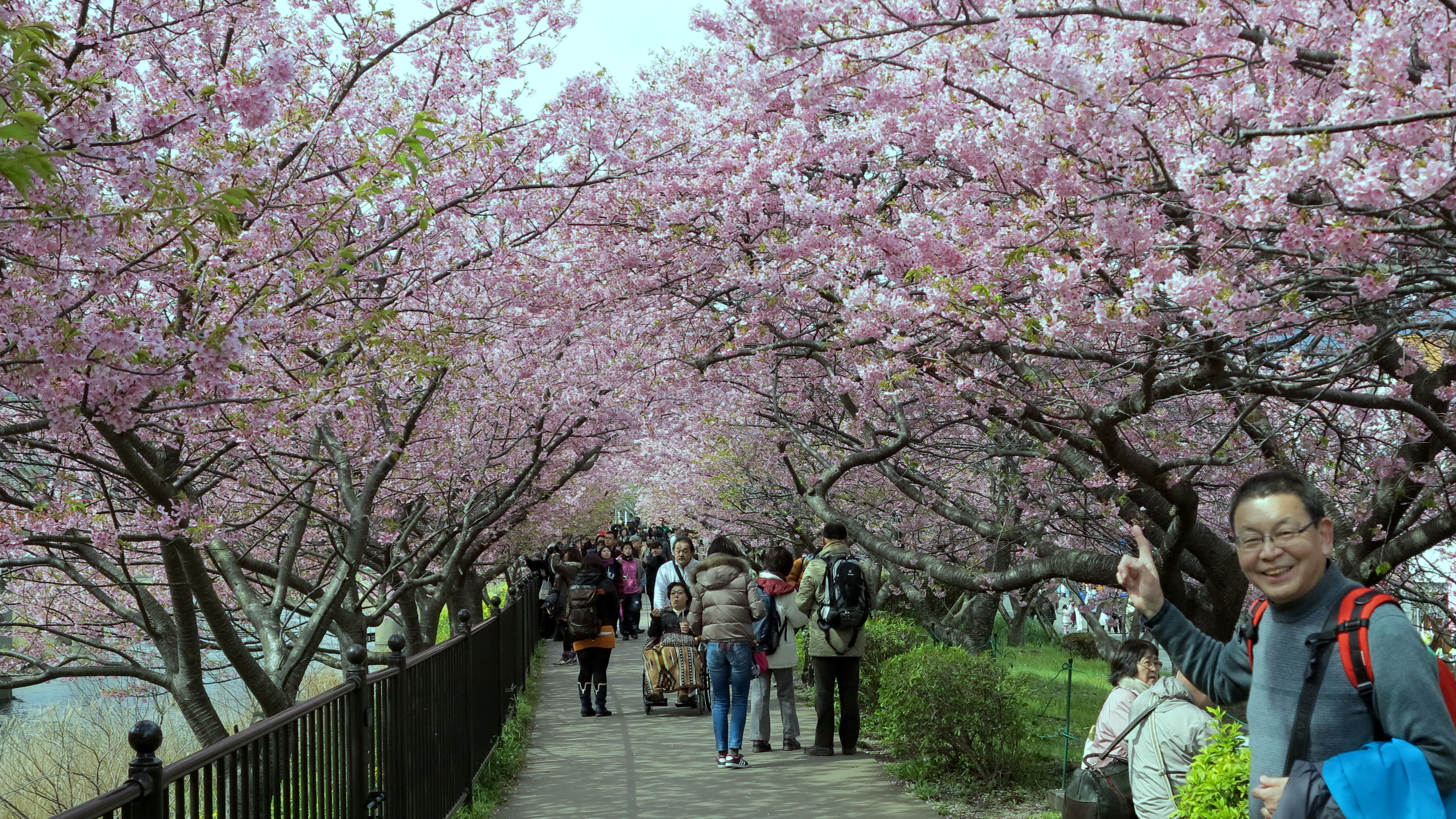
Kawazu sakura

Kawazu (河津町, Kawazu-chō) is a town located on the east coast of Izu Peninsula in Kamo District, Shizuoka Prefecture, Japan. As of 1 August 2019, the town had an estimated population of 7,203 in 3334 households, and a population density of 71 persons per km^{2}. The total area of the town is 100.79 square kilometres (38.92 sq mi). The town is noted for its Kawazu sakura, a variety of early-blooming sakura.

== Geography ==
Kawazu occupies a portion of the eastern coastline of Izu Peninsula, facing Sagami Bay and the Pacific Ocean. It is bordered to the west by the Amagi Mountains. The town has a temperate maritime climate characterized by hot summers and short cool winters, with the weather moderated by the effects of the warm Kuroshio current offshore. Parts of the town are within the limits of the Fuji-Hakone-Izu National Park. The area is noted for a large number of hot springs.

=== Neighbouring municipalities ===
Shizuoka Prefecture

- Shimoda
- Nishiizu
- Matsuzaki
- Ito
- Higashiizu

== Demographics ==
Per Japanese census data, the population of Kawazu has been in slow decline over the past 50 years.

Historical population
Year	Pop.	±%
1940	9,170	—
1950	10,768	+17.4%
1960	10,547	−2.1%
1970	9,624	−8.8%
1980	9,509	−1.2%
1990	9,118	−4.1%
2000	8,705	−4.5%
2010	8,002	−8.1%

=== Climate ===
The city has a climate characterized by hot and humid summers, and relatively mild winters (Köppen climate classification Cfa). The average annual temperature in Kawazu is 16.3 °C. The average annual rainfall is 2134 mm with September as the wettest month. The temperatures are highest on average in August, at around 26.3 °C, and lowest in January, at around 7.3 °C.

== History ==
During the Edo period, the area around Kawazu was tenryō territory controlled directly by the Tokugawa shogunate or various hatamoto. With the establishment of the modern municipalities system in 1889, the village of Kawazu was created, along with Kamikawazu and Shimokawazu, through the merger of 15 small hamlets within Kamo District. The town of Kawazu was created through the merger of the villages of Kamikazu and Shimokawazu in September 1958.

Around March 31, 2010, the city of Shimoda and three municipalities in Kamo District (Kawazu, Matsuzaki, and Minamiizu) were scheduled to merge. However, the merger backed out.

== Economy ==
The local economy is based on farming and tourism centered on hot spring resorts.

== Education ==
Kawazu has three public elementary schools and one public junior high school operated by the town government. The town does not have a high school.

== Transportation ==
=== Railway ===
- - Izu Kyūkō Line
  - Imaihama-Kaigan Station, Kawazu Station

=== Highway ===
- National Route 135
- National Route 414
