= Atagawa Tropical & Alligator Garden =

Botanical garden with alligators in Shizuoka Prefecture, Japan

Coordinates: 34°49′00″N 139°04′04″E

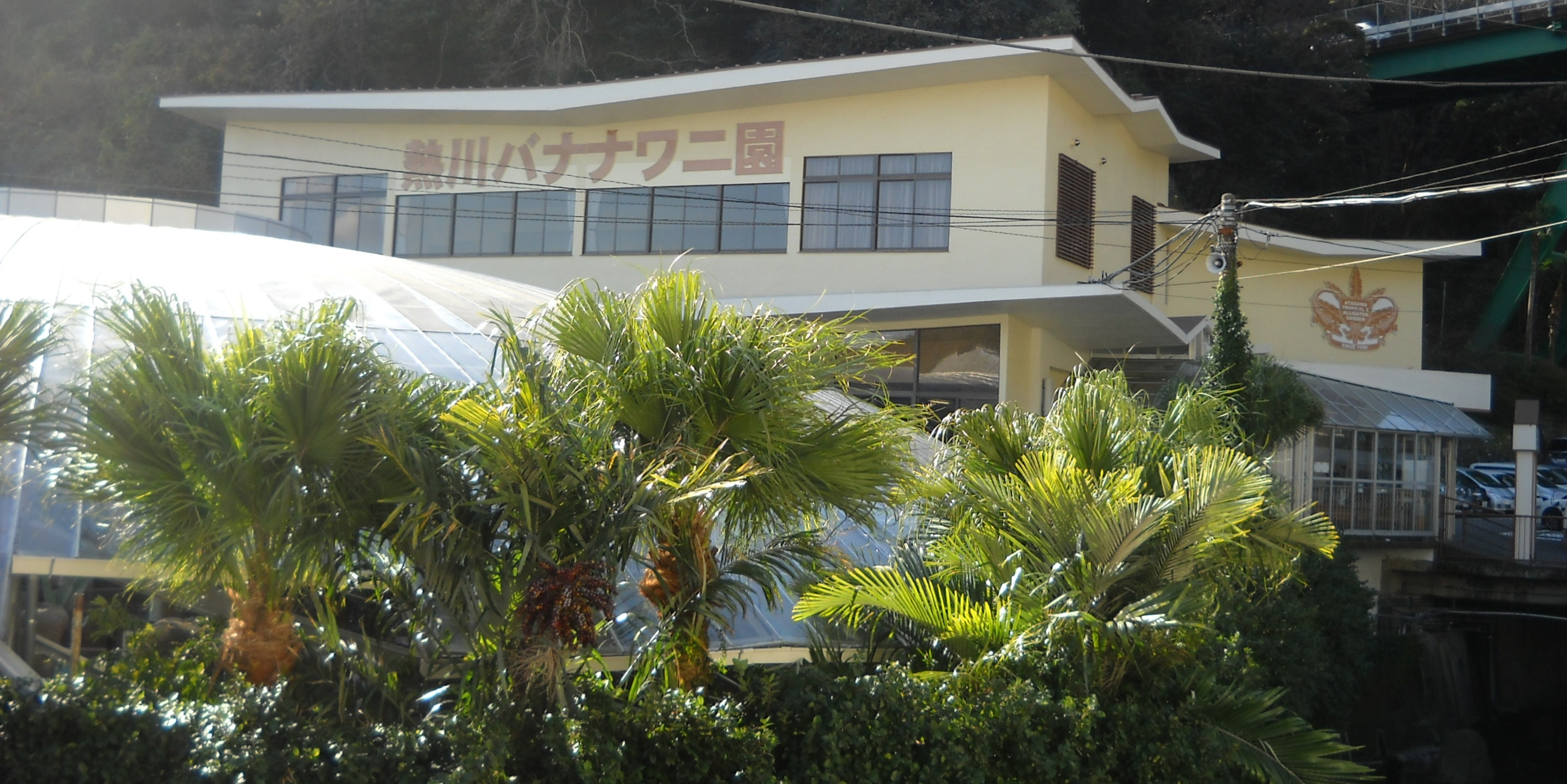
- Atagawa Tropical & Alligator Garden
- Interactive map of Atagawa Tropical & Alligator Garden
- Type: Private
- Location: Higashiizu, Shizuoka, Japan
- Created: 1958

The Atagawa Tropical & Alligator Garden (熱川バナナワニ園, Atagawa Banana Wani En) is a botanical garden with alligators located in the Fuji-Hakone-Izu National Park at 971-9 Naramoto, Higashiizu-cho, Kamo, Shizuoka Prefecture, Japan. It is open daily. An admission fee is charged.

The garden opened in 1958. According to Kawata, in 2004 it contained 29 reptile species (349 specimens) in its zoo. The garden also contains a tropical botanical garden and fruit garden heated by hot spring water, with a lotus greenhouse (giant lotus, etc.), main greenhouse (hibiscus, orchid, etc.) and annex greenhouse (banana, papaya, pineapple, etc.). Other plants include bougainvillea.

== See also ==
- List of botanical gardens in Japan
