= Kamo District, Shizuoka =

District in Shizuoka prefecture, Japan

Coordinates: 34.798°N 138.886°E

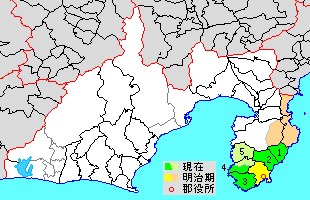
Map of Kamo District in Shizuoka Prefecture

Kamo District (賀茂郡, Kamo-gun) is a rural district located in Shizuoka Prefecture, Japan. As of July 2012, the district has an estimated population of 47,001 and a population density of 97.9 persons per km^{2}. The total area was 479.97 km^{2}.

== Towns and villages ==
Kamo District currently is composed of five towns. The city of Shimoda was formerly part of the district.

- Higashiizu
- Kawazu
- Matsuzaki
- Minamiizu
- Nishiizu

== History ==
The district name is very ancient, and is mentioned in the Engishiki records. Kamo District was one of the original districts of Izu Province, having been separated from Suruga Province along with Tagata District in the cadastral reform of 680 AD.

Modern Kamo District was established in the July 22, 1878 cadastral reforms initiated by the Meiji government with one town (Shimoda) and 119 villages.

In a round of consolidation on April 1, 1889, this was reduced to 1 town and 26 villages. On June 1, 1891, Atami was raised to town status. However, on April 4, 1896, the area of the district was reduced by the transfer of Atami and nine villages to Tagata District.

Matsuzaki was raised to town status on March 15, 1901, followed by Inatori on December 1, 1920. With the establishment of Minamiizu on July 31, 1955 and Nishiizu on March 31, 1956, the number of remaining villages was reduced to four.

On September 1, 1958 Kawazu was elevated to town status. This was followed by the establishment of Higashiizu on May 3, 1959. Shimoda gained city status on January 1, 1971 On April 1, 2005 - Kamo Village, the one remaining village in the district, merged with the town of Nishiizu

== See also ==
- Kamo District, Gifu
- Higashikamo District, Aichi
- Nishikamo District, Aichi
- Kamo District, Hiroshima
