= Itō Station =

Railway station in Itō, Shizuoka Prefecture, Japan

JT26 IZ01 Itō Station 伊東駅
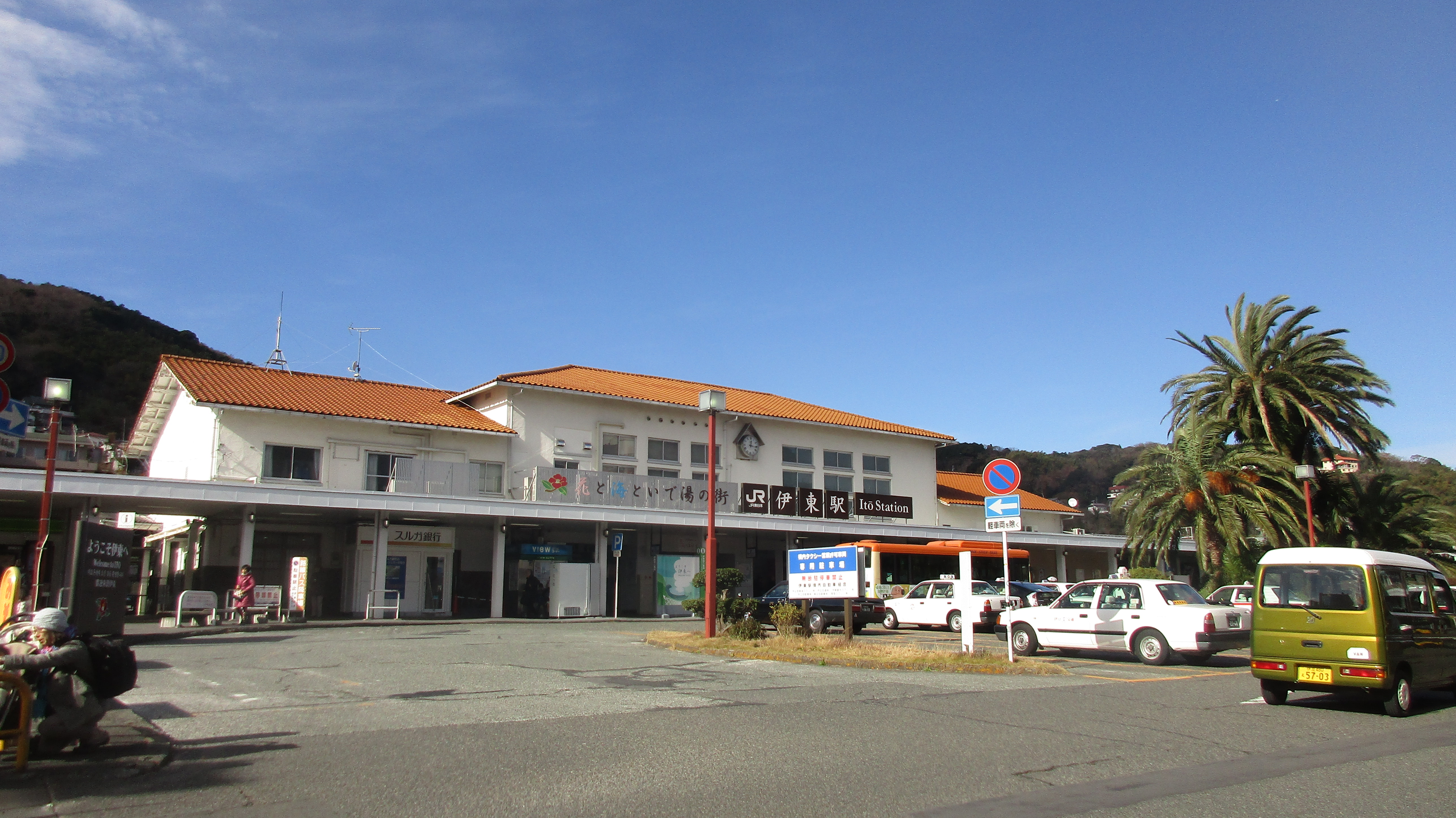
- Itō Station in December 2016

General information
- Location: 3-12-1 Yukawa, Itō City, Shizuoka Prefecture; Japan
- Coordinates: 34.974789°N 139.092161°E
- Operator: JR East; Izukyū Corporation; JR Freight
- Lines: Itō Line; Izu Kyūkō Line
- Distance: 13.0 km (8.1 mi) from Atami
- Platforms: 2 side platforms
- Tracks: 3

Construction
- Structure type: At grade

Other information
- Status: Staffed ("Midori no Madoguchi")
- Station code: JT26; IZ01
- Website: Official website

History
- Opened: 15 December 1938; 87 years ago

Passengers
- FY2017: 7,822 daily (JR); 5,316 (Izukyu)

Services
Preceding station	JR East	Following station
through to Izukyū Corporation	Saphir Odoriko	Atami JT21 towards Tokyo or Shinjuku
through to Izukyū Corporation	Odoriko	Ajiro JT24 towards Tokyo
through to Izukyū Corporation	Itō Line	Usami JT25 towards Atami
Preceding station	Izukyū	Following station
Izu-Kōgen IZ06 towards Izukyū-Shimoda	Saphir Odoriko and Odoriko	through to JR East
Minami-Itō IZ02 towards Izukyū Shimoda	Izu Kyūkō Line	through to JR East
Location
- Location within Shizuoka Prefecture Location within Central Japan Location within Japan

Itō Station (伊東駅, Itō-eki) is a railway station located in the city of Itō, Shizuoka, Japan operated by the East Japan Railway Company (JR East), with the Izukyū Corporation's Izu Kyūkō Line as a tenant running a through service. It also has a freight depot for the Japan Freight Railway Company.

== Lines ==
Itō Station is the terminal station of the Itō Line, and is located 16.9 kilometers from the opposing terminus of the line at Atami Station and 121.5 kilometers from Tokyo Station.

== Station layout ==
Itō Station has a single island platform serving Track 1 and Track 2 and a single side platform serving Track 3. The platforms are connected by an underpass. The Izu Kyūkō trains use the outer Tracks 1 and 3, whereas the Itō Line pulls into Track 2, and reverses out in the opposite direction. The station building has automated ticket machines and Suica and PASMO automated turnstiles as well as a "Midori no Madoguchi" staffed ticket office.

=== Platforms ===
1	■ Izu Kyūkō Line	for Izu-Kōgen, Izu-Atagawa, Izu-Inatori, Kawazu and Izukyū Shimoda
2	Itō Line	(Reversing and letting faster trains pass only)
2	Itō Line	for Atami (Night time only)
3	Itō Line (Tōkaidō Line・Ueno-Tokyo Line)	for Atami, Yokohama, Tōkyō, Ōmiya, Utsunomiya (via Utsunomiya Line), Kagohara (via Takasaki Line)
3	■ Izu Kyūkō Line	for Izu-Kōgen, Izu-Atagawa, Izu-Inatori, Kawazu, Izukyū Shimoda

== History ==
Itō Station opened on December 15, 1938 when the section of the Itō Line linking Ajiro with Itō was completed. On December 10, 1961, Izu Kyūkō began operations on a line linking Itō with Shimoda. Freight services were discontinued from October 1, 1980, but were resumed on March 31, 1987. On April 1, 1987 along with division and privatization of the Japan National Railway, East Japan Railway Company started operating this station.

== Passenger statistics ==
In fiscal 2017, the JR portion of station was used by an average of 7822 passengers daily (boarding passengers only). The Izukyu portion of the station was used by 5316 passengers daily (boarding passengers only).

== Surrounding area ==
- Itō Onsen

== See also ==
- List of railway stations in Japan
