= Izukyū Corporation =

Private railroad company in Japan (founded 1959)

- Native name: 伊豆急行株式会社
- Romanized name: Izu Kyūkō kabushiki gaisha
- Company type: subsidiary
- Industry: Transportation
- Founded: April 11, 1959
- Founder: Tokyu Corporation
- Headquarters: Itō, Shizuoka, Japan
- Area served: Izu Peninsula, Shizuoka Prefecture, Japan
- Key people: Kenji Hijikata (President)
- Revenue: 7.4 billion Yen (2004)
- Total equity: 90 million Yen
- Number of employees: 239 (as of Q1 2020)
- Parent: Tokyu Corporation
- Subsidiaries: Shimoda Ropeway
- Website: https://www.izukyu.co.jp/

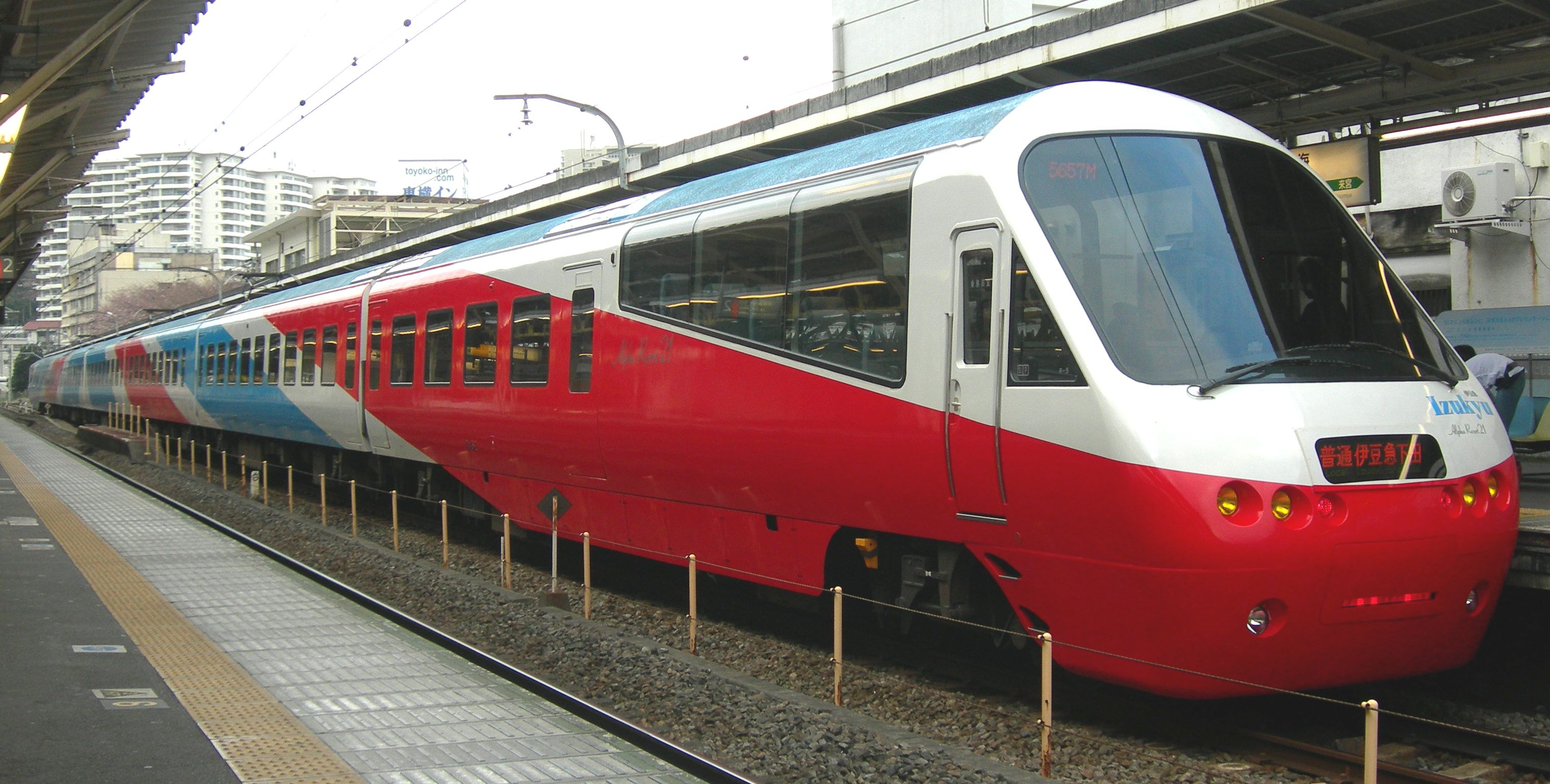
Izukyu 2100 series Alpha Resort 21 train

The Izukyū Corporation (伊豆急行株式会社, Izu Kyūkō kabushiki gaisha; lit. "Izu Express Stock Company") is a private railroad company in Japan, and a subsidiary of the Tokyu Corporation. The company operates the Izu Kyūkō Line train service on Izu Peninsula in Shizuoka Prefecture, and has subsidiary operations involved in taxi and bus services, as well as real estate and leisure resort development and a cable television network.

== Company history ==
The Tokyu Corporation began preliminary work on a train line connecting Itō Station, the terminus of the Japanese National Railways' Itō Line, with Shimoda, at the southern tip of the Izu Peninsula in 1956. A wholly owned subsidiary, the Itō-Shimoda Electric Railway Company (伊東下田電気鉄道株式会社, Itō-Shimoda Denkitetsudo K.K.) was created on April 11, 1959, and construction work on the new line began in February 1960. On February 20, 1961, the company changed its name to its current name of Izukyū Corporation. Actual train operation began at Itō Station on December 10, 1961, and a centralized traffic control center established at Itō in 1982.

Izukyū Corporation was listed in the Second Section of the Tokyo Stock Exchange from November 1, 1972. However, it was delisted on October 1, 2004 and returned to the status of a fully owned subsidiary of the Tokyu Corporation.

== Lines ==
At present, the company operates one train line, the Izu Kyūkō Line, with a total length of 45.7 kilometers.

The Shimoda Ropeway is a subsidiary of the Izukyū Corporation.

== Rolling stock ==
=== Active ===
- 2100 series (introduced 1985)
- 8000 series (former Tokyu 8000 series transferred to Izukyu in 2004)
- 3000 series (former JR East 209-2100 series, introduced 2022)
