= Odawara (disambiguation) =

Odawara (小田原) may refer to:

== Locations ==
- Odawara, a city in Kanagawa Prefecture, Japan
- Odawara Castle, a castle in Odawara, Kanagawa Prefecture, Japan
- Odawara Domain, a Japanese domain of the Edo period
- Odawara-juku, the ninth of the fifty-three stations of the Tōkaidō
- Odawara Women's Junior College, a private women's junior college in Odawara Kanagawa Prefecture, Japan
- Odawara Campus of Kanto Gakuin University

== People ==
- Odawara Hōjō (小田原北条) or Odawara Hōjōshi (小田原北条氏), other names for the Later Hōjō clan (後北条氏)
- Takashi Odawara (小田原貴, b. 1992), a Japanese footballer

== Transport ==
- Odawara Station, a railway station operated by JR East in Odawara, Kanagawa, Japan
- Odakyū Odawara Line, the main railway line run by Odakyu Electric Railway
- Odawara-Atsugi Road, a 4-laned toll road in Kanagawa Prefecture, Japan
- Home Liner Odawara, a service for commuters on the Tōkaidō Main Line operated by JR East

== See also ==
- Siege of Odawara (disambiguation), multiple battles at Odawara Castle
