= Kayama =

Kayama (written: 加山, 香山, 嘉弥真) is a Japanese surname. Notable people with the surname include:

- Shinsuke Kayama (香山 進介, born 1959), Japanese swimmer
- Shinya Kayama (嘉弥真 新也, born 1989), Japanese professional baseball player
- Toshio Kayama (加山 俊夫, born 1945), Japanese mayor
- Yukihiro Kayama (加山 幸浩, born 1939), Japanese businessman
- Yūzō Kayama (加山 雄三, born 1937), Japanese musician and actor

== Fictional characters ==
- Licca Kayama (香山 リカ), a character in the anime series Super Doll Licca-chan
- Nemuri Kayama, a character in My Hero Academia

== See also ==
- Kayama Station, a railway station in Odawara, Kanagawa Prefecture, Japan
