= Ishigakiyama Ichiya Castle =

- 石垣山一夜城
- Odawara, Kanagawa Prefecture, Japan
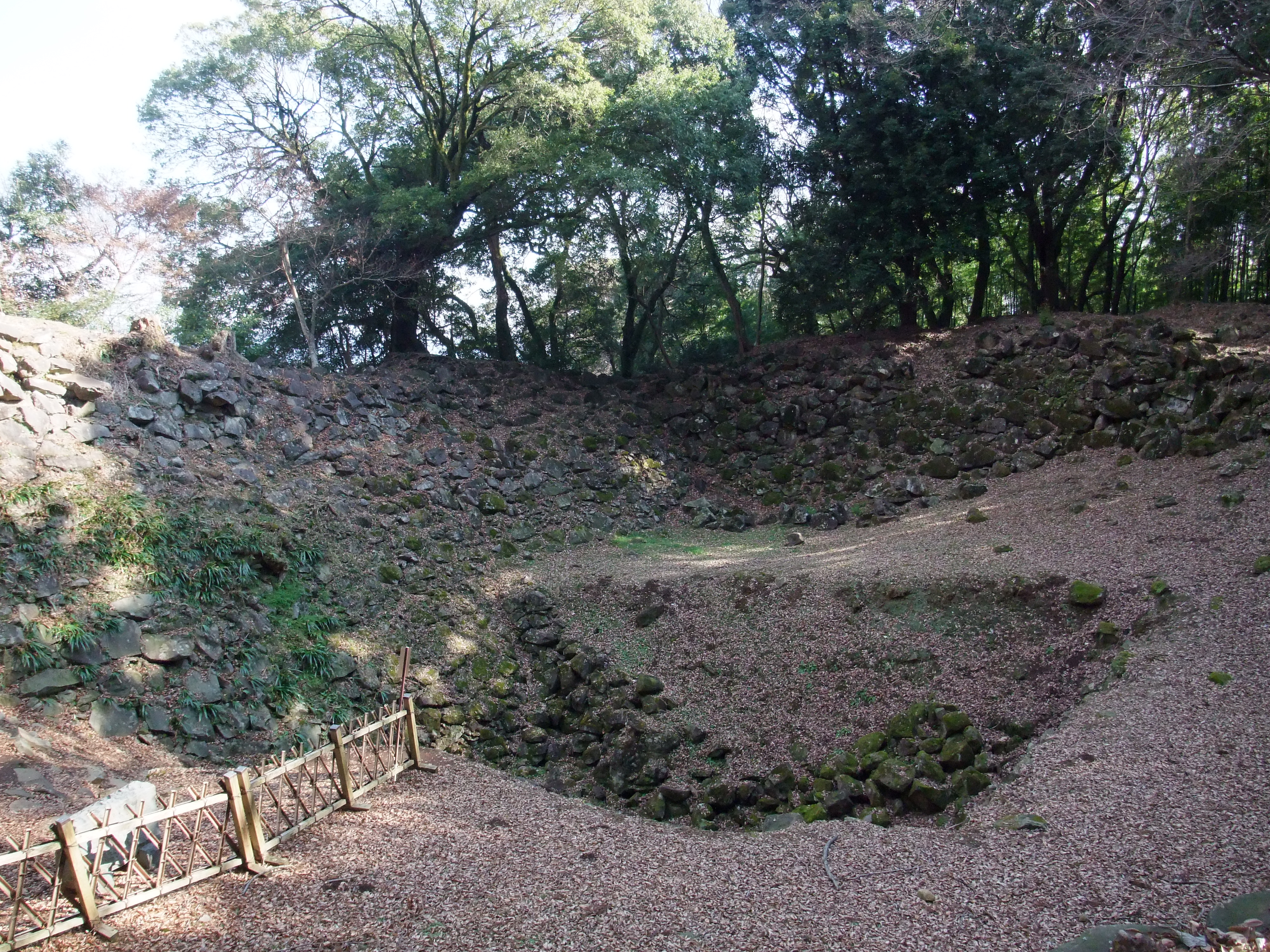
- Well and stone wall of Ishigakiyama Ichiya Castle

Site information
- Type: Mountaintop-style castle
- Owner: Toyotomi clan
- Condition: ruins

Location
- Coordinates: 35°14′7.5″N 139°7′40″E

Site history
- Built: 1590
- Built by: Toyotomi Hideyoshi
- Materials: Stone walls
- Demolished: 1590
- Events: Siege of Odawara (1590)

Garrison information
- Past commanders: Toyotomi Hideyoshi

Ishigakiyama Ichiya Castle (石垣山一夜城, Ishigakiyama Ichiya-jō) was a late Sengoku period Japanese castle in Odawara, Kanagawa Prefecture, Japan. It was one of the most famous among the castles built by Toyotomi Hideyoshi, and was the site of his first meeting with Date Masamune. Its ruins were designated a National Historic Site in 1959.

== History ==
During the siege of Odawara in 1590, Toyotomi Hideyoshi built the castle to show his power and put pressure on the Late Hōjō clan.

The castle is located on a hill named Kasagakeyama three kilometers west from Odawara Castle, which overlooked all of the Odawara's defenses. Although intended from the start as a temporary fortification, it was built with massive stone walls and a tenshu central keep. Hideyoshi was noted as both a master castle builder and a master of psychological warfare. It was constructed in secret in a wooded area over an 80 day period, so that when the trees were cut one night, the castle suddenly appeared. To the Hōjō defenders, it looked like the castle was built in just one night, which resulted in demoralization and a loss in the will to continue resistance against the Toyotomi army. As a result, only nine days later Hōjō clan formally surrendered. Afterwards, the castle was abandoned, and soon fell into ruins.

The castle site is now Odawara City's municipal park. The site was listed as one of the Continued Top 100 Japanese Castles in 2017.

== Access ==
About 50 minutes by walk from Hayakawa Station.

== Gallery ==
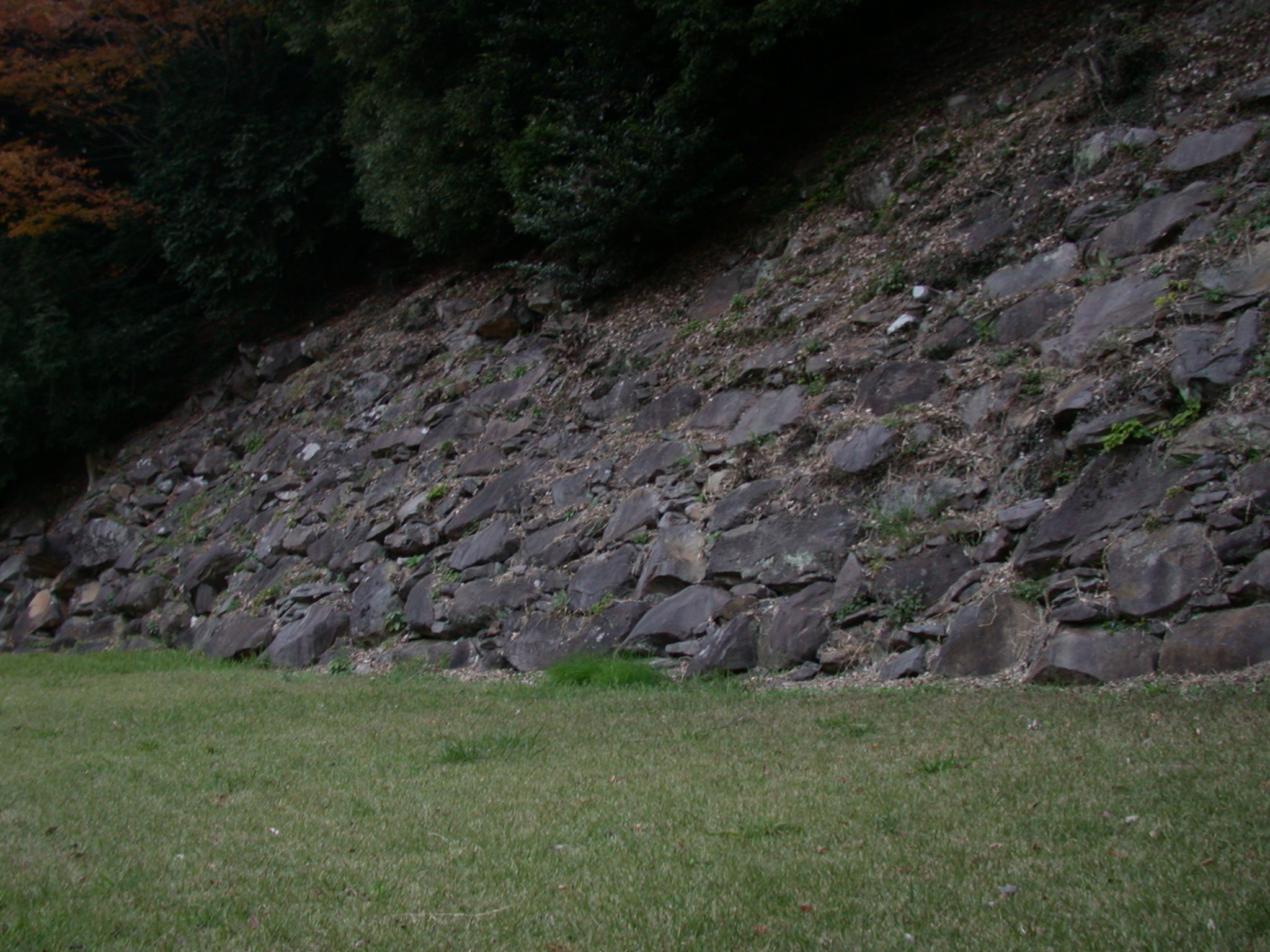
Stone wall of Minamikuruwa compound

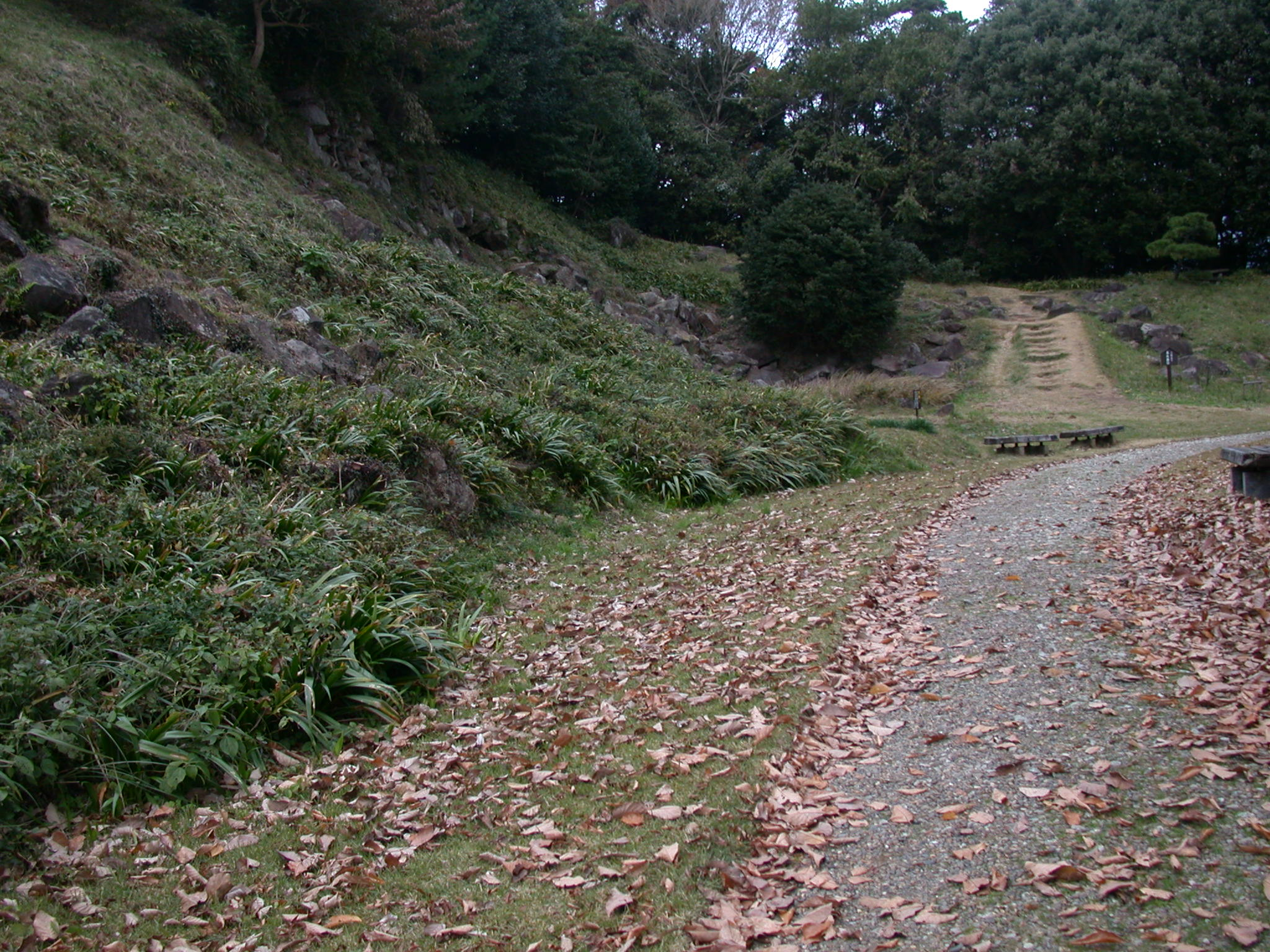
Stone wall and gate of Honmaru compound

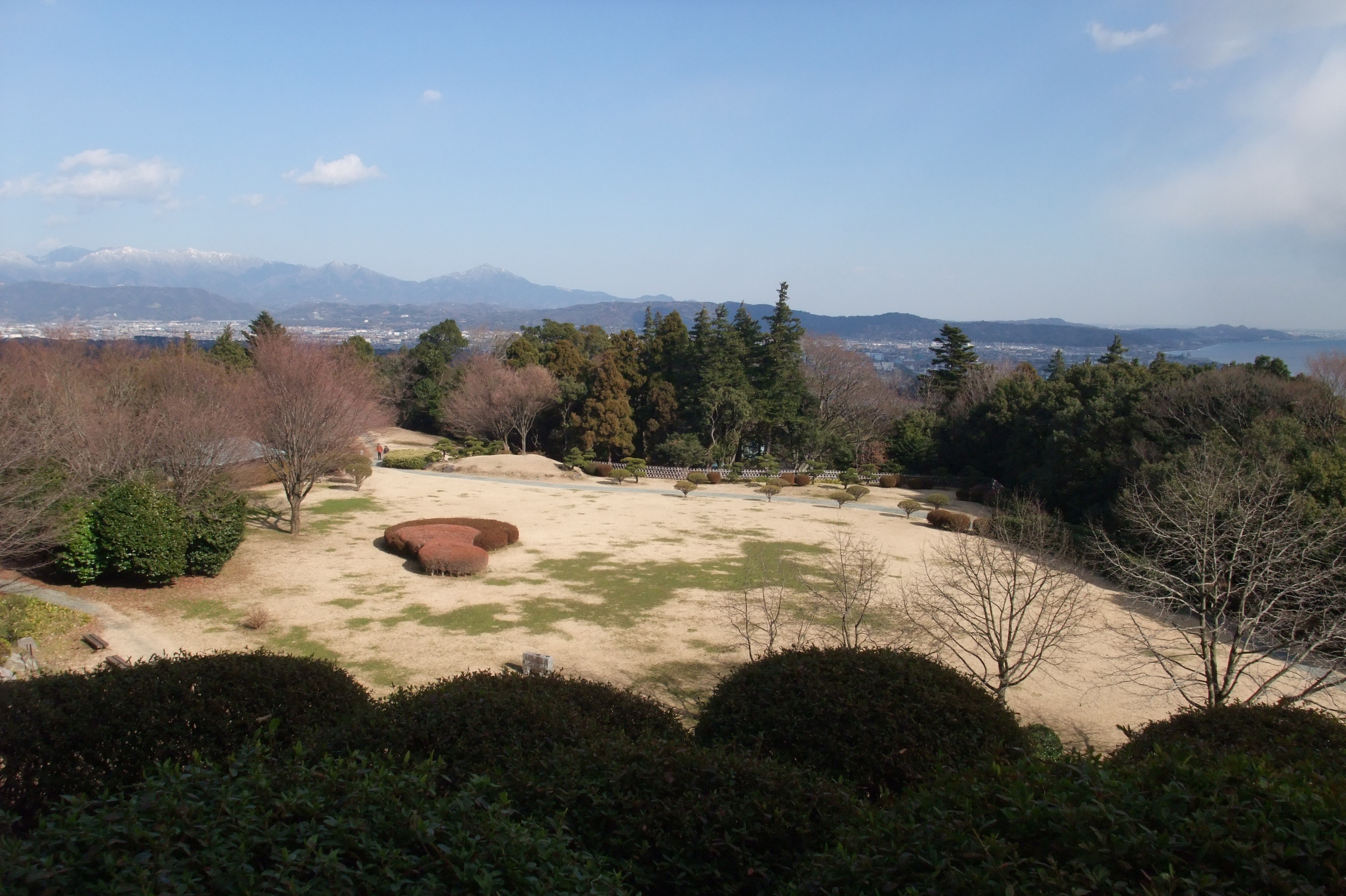
Ninomaru compound

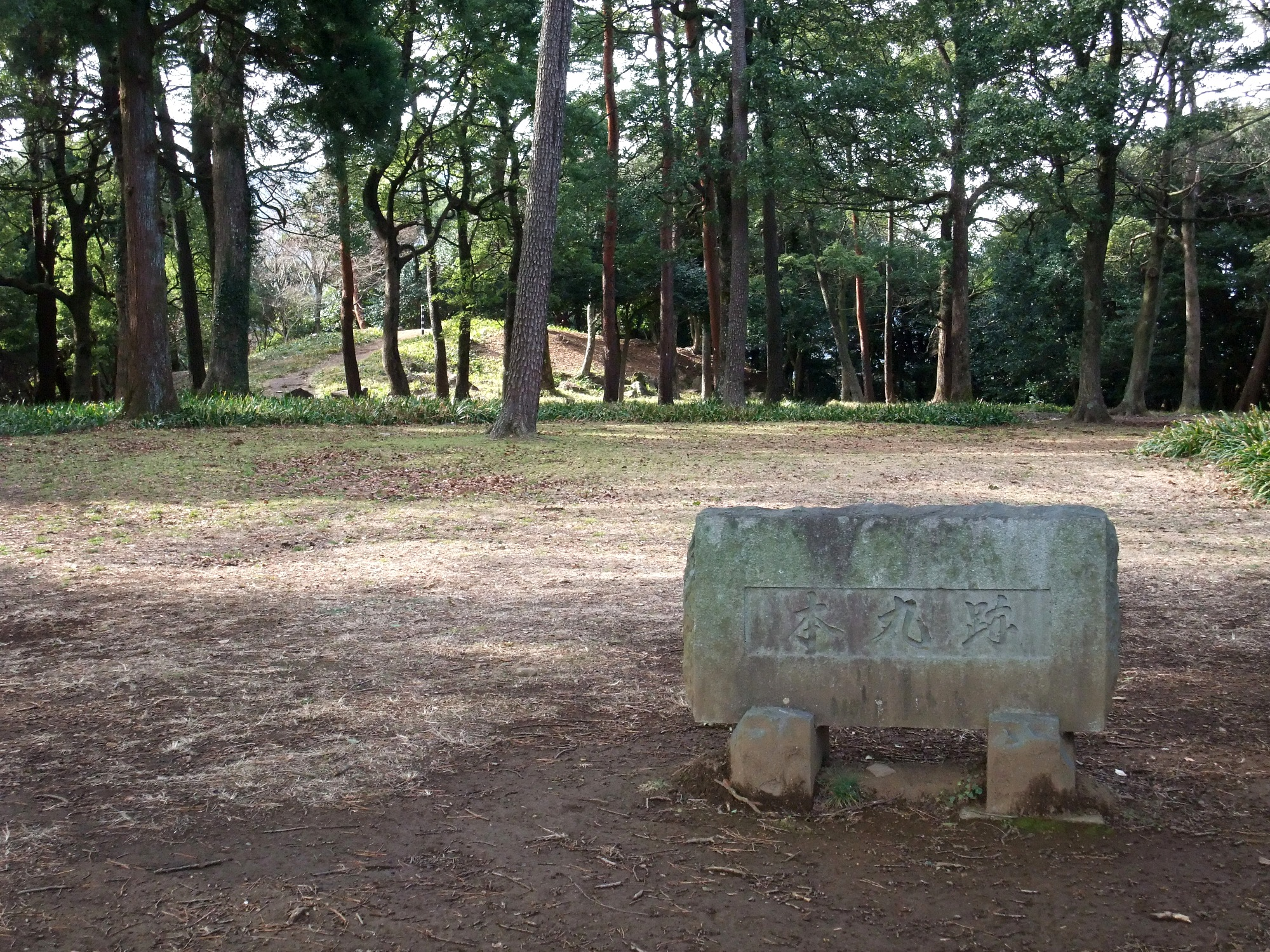
Honmaru compound of Ishigakiyama Ichiya Castle

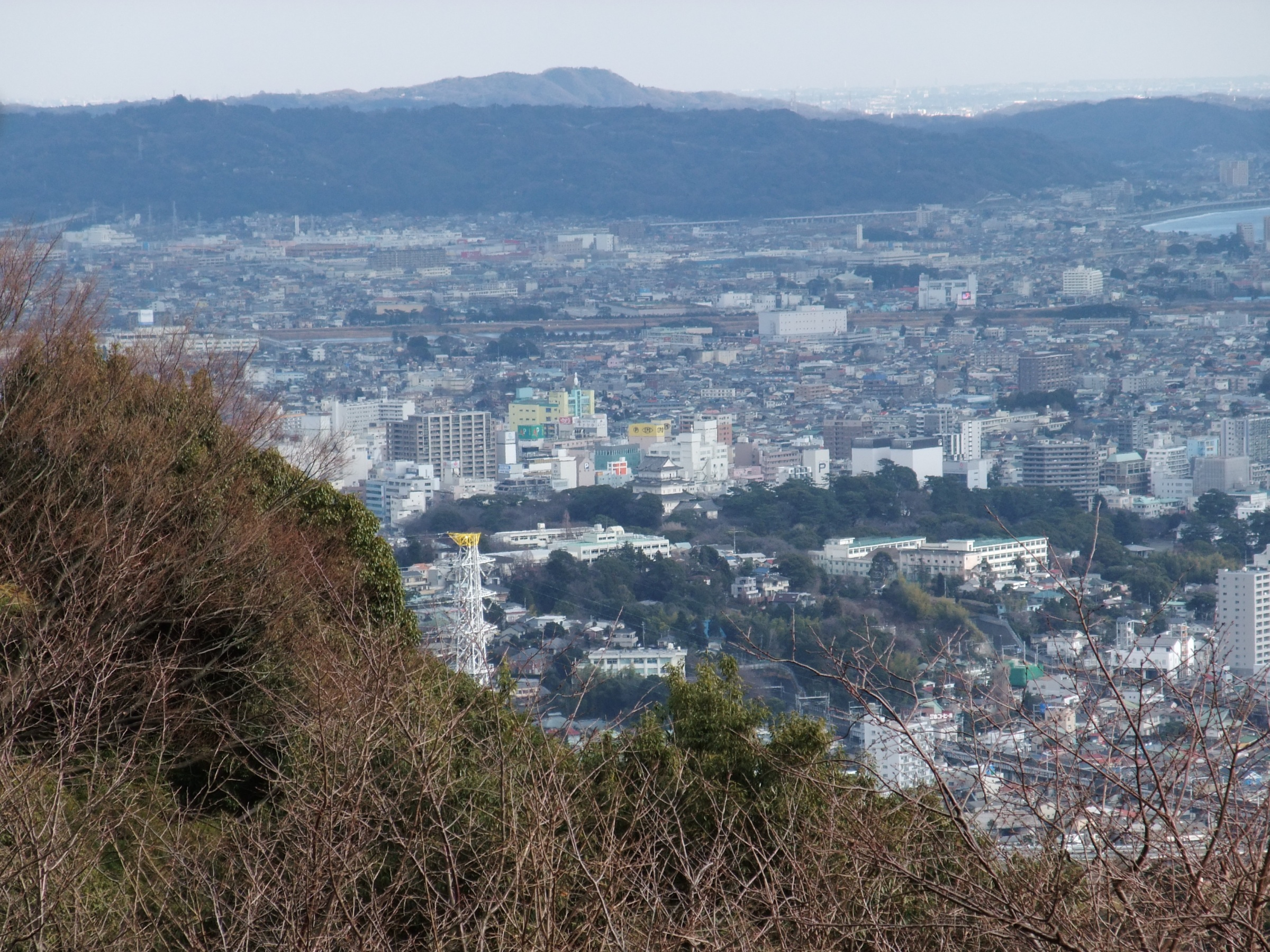
View from the castle

== See also ==
- List of Historic Sites of Japan (Kanagawa)
