= Kawana Station (Shizuoka) =

Railway station in Itō, Shizuoka Prefecture, Japan

Kawana Station 川奈駅
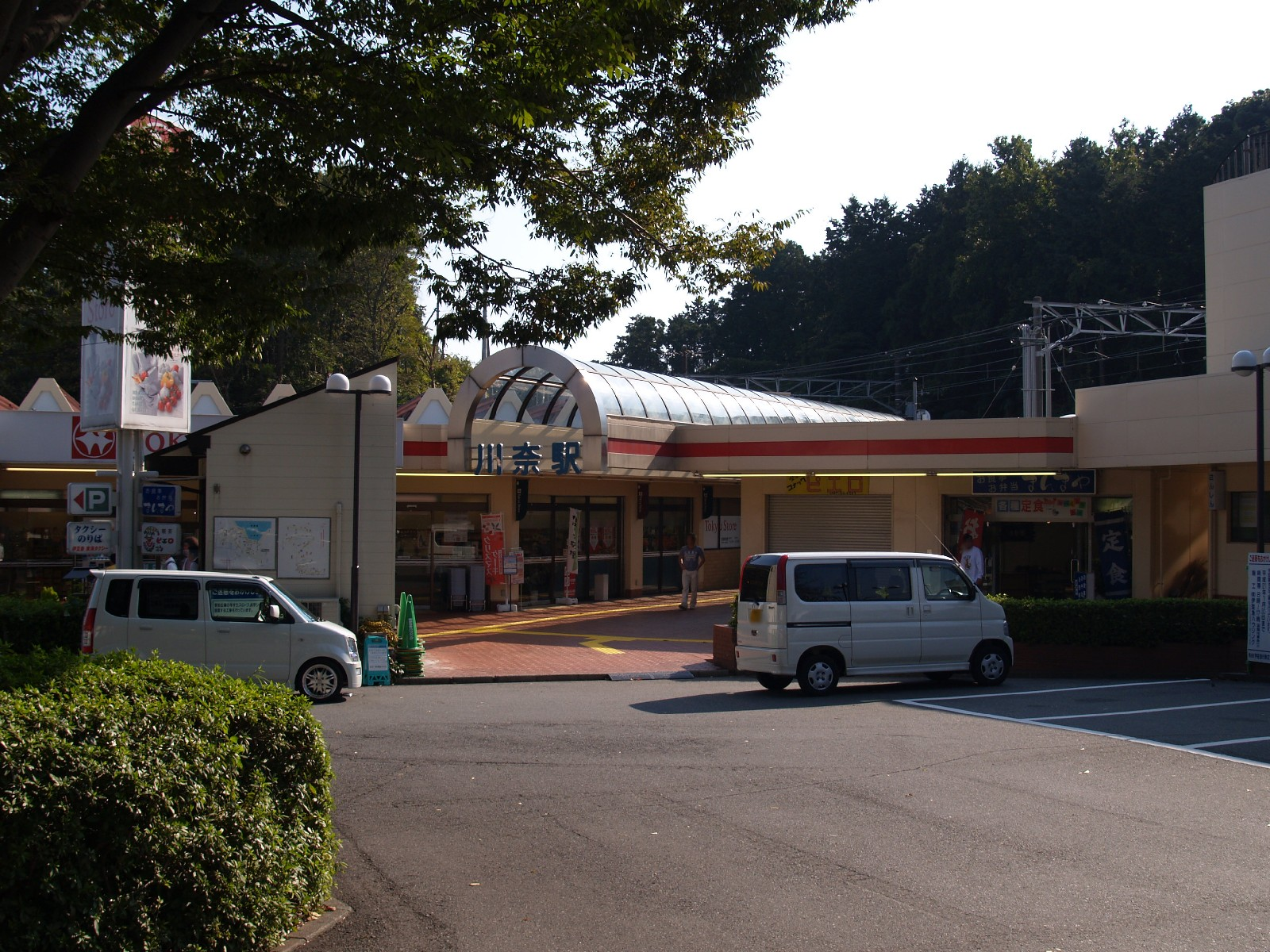
- Kawana Station in November 2008

General information
- Location: Kawana, Itō-shi, Shizuoka-ken 414-0044; Japan
- Coordinates: 34°57′4″N 139°7′25″E
- Operator: Izukyū Corporation
- Line: ■ Izu Kyūkō Line
- Distance: 2.0 kilometers from Itō
- Platforms: 2 side platforms

Other information
- Status: Staffed
- Station code: IZ03
- Website: Official website

History
- Opened: December 10, 1961

Passengers
- FY2017: 767 daily
Location
- Location within Shizuoka Prefecture Location within Japan

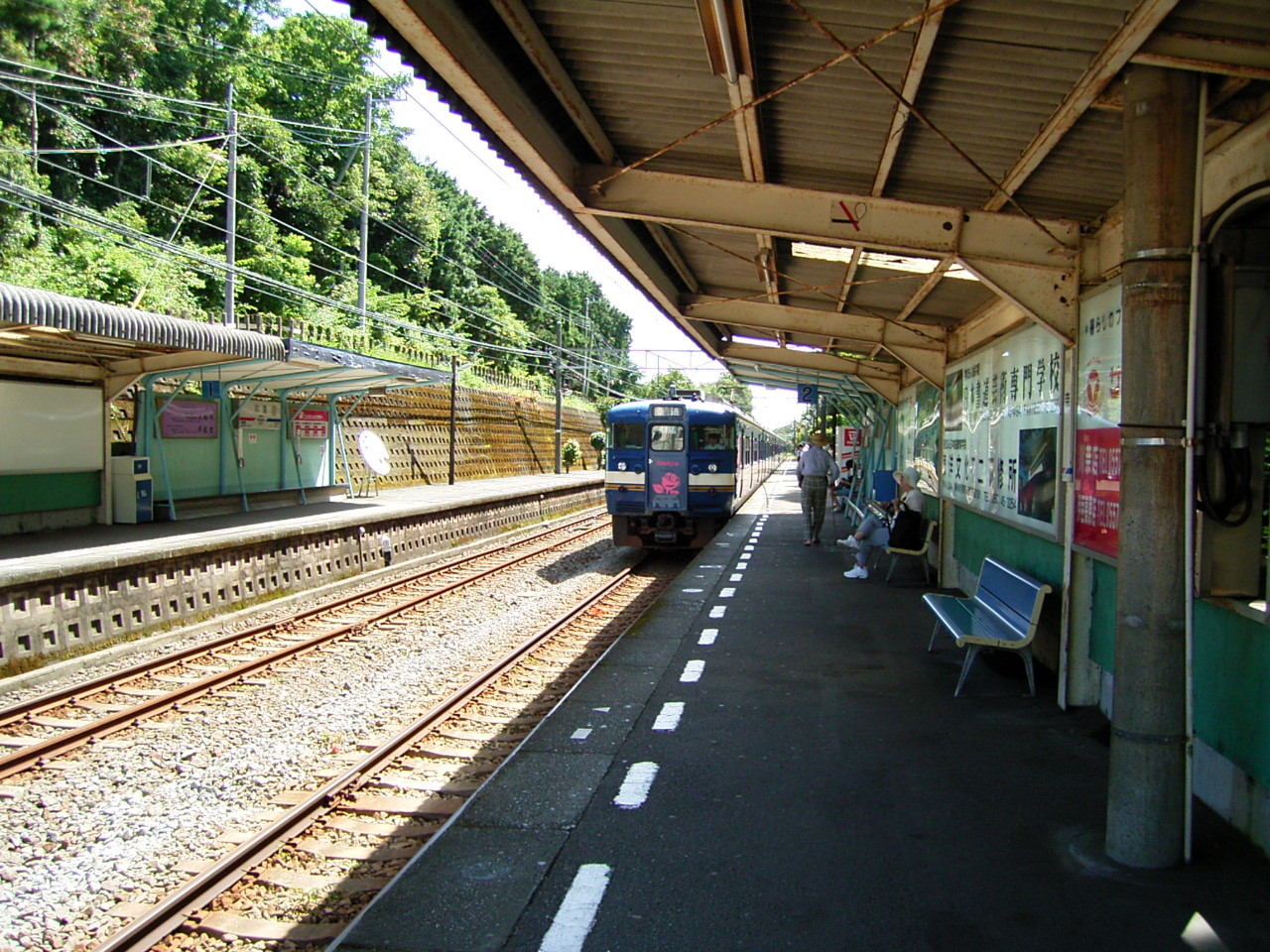
Platforms

Kawana Station (川奈駅, Kawana-eki) is a railway station located in the eastern part of Itō, Shizuoka Prefecture, Japan operated by the private railroad company Izukyū Corporation.

== Lines ==
Kawana Station is served by the Izu Kyūkō Line, and is located 6.1 kilometers from the starting point of the line at Itō Station and 23.0 kilometers from Atami Station.

== Station layout ==
The station has two opposed ground-level side platforms connected by a level crossing. The station is staffed.

=== Platforms ===
1	■ Izu Kyūkō Line	Izu-Kōgen ・ Izu-Atagawa ・ Izu-Inatori ・ Kawazu ・ Izukyū Shimoda
2	■ Izu Kyūkō Line	Itō ・ Atami

== Adjacent stations ==
«	Service	»
Izu Kyūkō Line
Minami-Itō	Local	Futo

== History ==
Kawana Station was opened on December 10, 1961. The station building was rebuilt in 1980.

== Passenger statistics ==
In fiscal 2017, the station was used by an average of 767 passengers daily (boarding passengers only).

== Surrounding area ==
- Kawana Onsen
- Japan National Route 135

== See also ==
- List of railway stations in Japan
