= Jōgasaki-Kaigan Station =

Railway station in Itō, Shizuoka Prefecture, Japan

Jōgasaki-Kaigan Station 城ヶ崎海岸駅
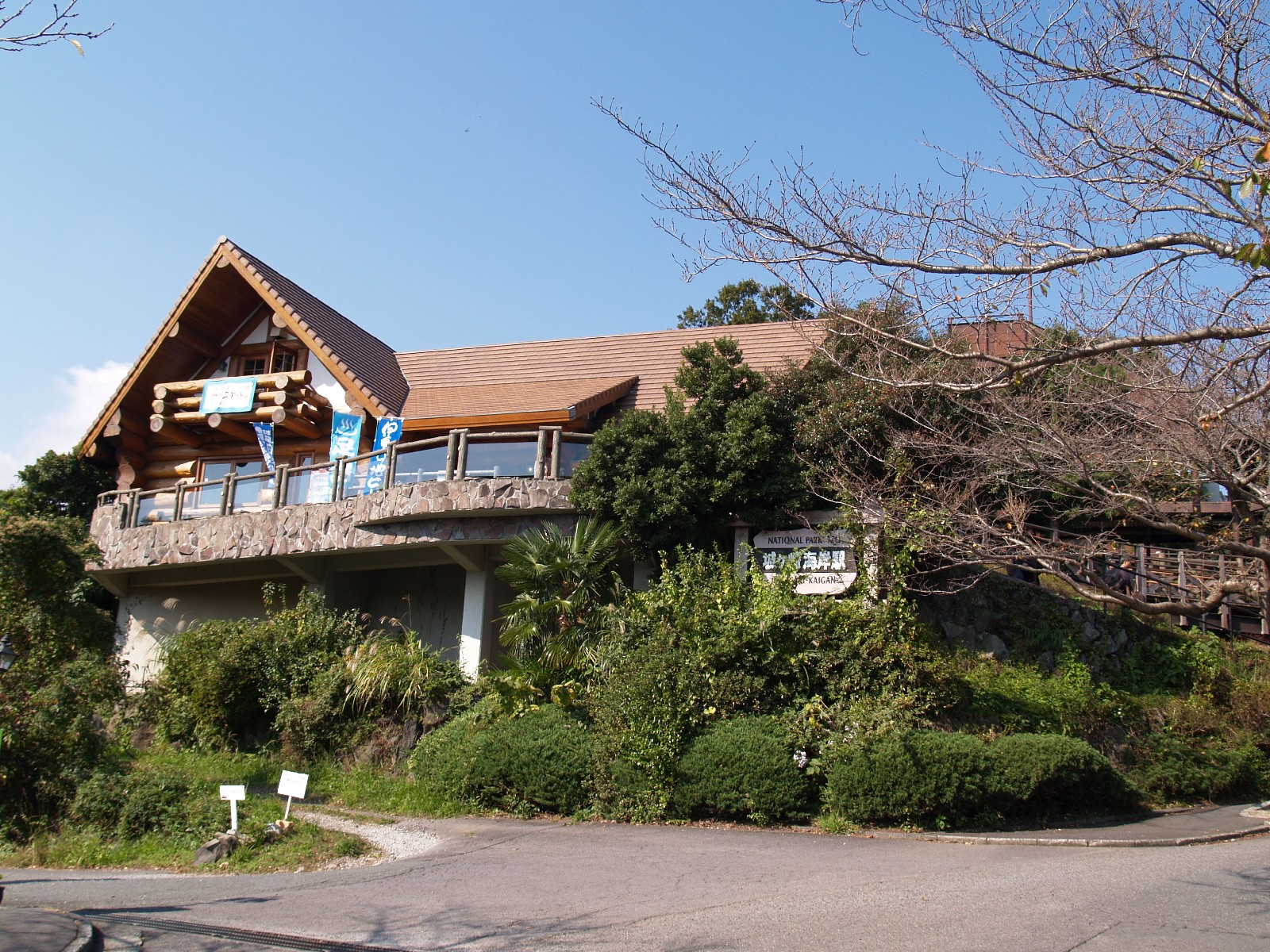
- Jōgasaki-Kaigan Station in November 2008

General information
- Location: Futo, Itō-shi, Shizuoka-ken 413-0231; Japan
- Coordinates: 34.889337°N 139.121686°E
- Operator: Izukyū Corporation
- Line: ■ Izu Kyūkō Line
- Distance: 13.9 kilometers from Itō
- Platforms: 1 side platforms

Other information
- Status: Staffed
- Station code: IZ05
- Website: Official website

History
- Opened: March 15, 1972

Passengers
- FY2017: 374 daily
Location
- Location within Shizuoka Prefecture Location within Japan

Jōgasaki-Kaigan Station (城ヶ崎海岸駅, Jōgasaki-Kaigan-eki) is a railway station located in the southern part of Itō, Shizuoka Prefecture, Japan operated by the private railroad company Izukyū Corporation.

== Lines ==
Jōgasaki-Kaigan Station is served by the Izu Kyūkō Line, and is located 13.9 kilometers from the starting point of the line at Itō Station and 30.8 kilometers from Atami Station.

== Station layout ==
The station has one ground-level side platform serving a single bi-directional track. The station is attended.

== Adjacent stations ==
«	Service	»
Izu Kyūkō Line
Futo	Local	Izu-Kōgen

== History ==
Jōgasaki-Kaigan Station was opened on March 15, 1972. The station building was rebuilt as a log house in commemoration of 30th anniversary of the opening of the Izu Kyūkō Line in 1991.

== Passenger statistics ==
In fiscal 2017, the station was used by an average of 374 passengers daily (boarding passengers only).

== Surrounding area ==
- Jōgasaki beach
- Japan National Route 135

== See also ==
- List of railway stations in Japan
