= Minami-Itō Station =

Railway station in Itō, Shizuoka Prefecture, Japan

Minami-Itō Station 南伊東駅
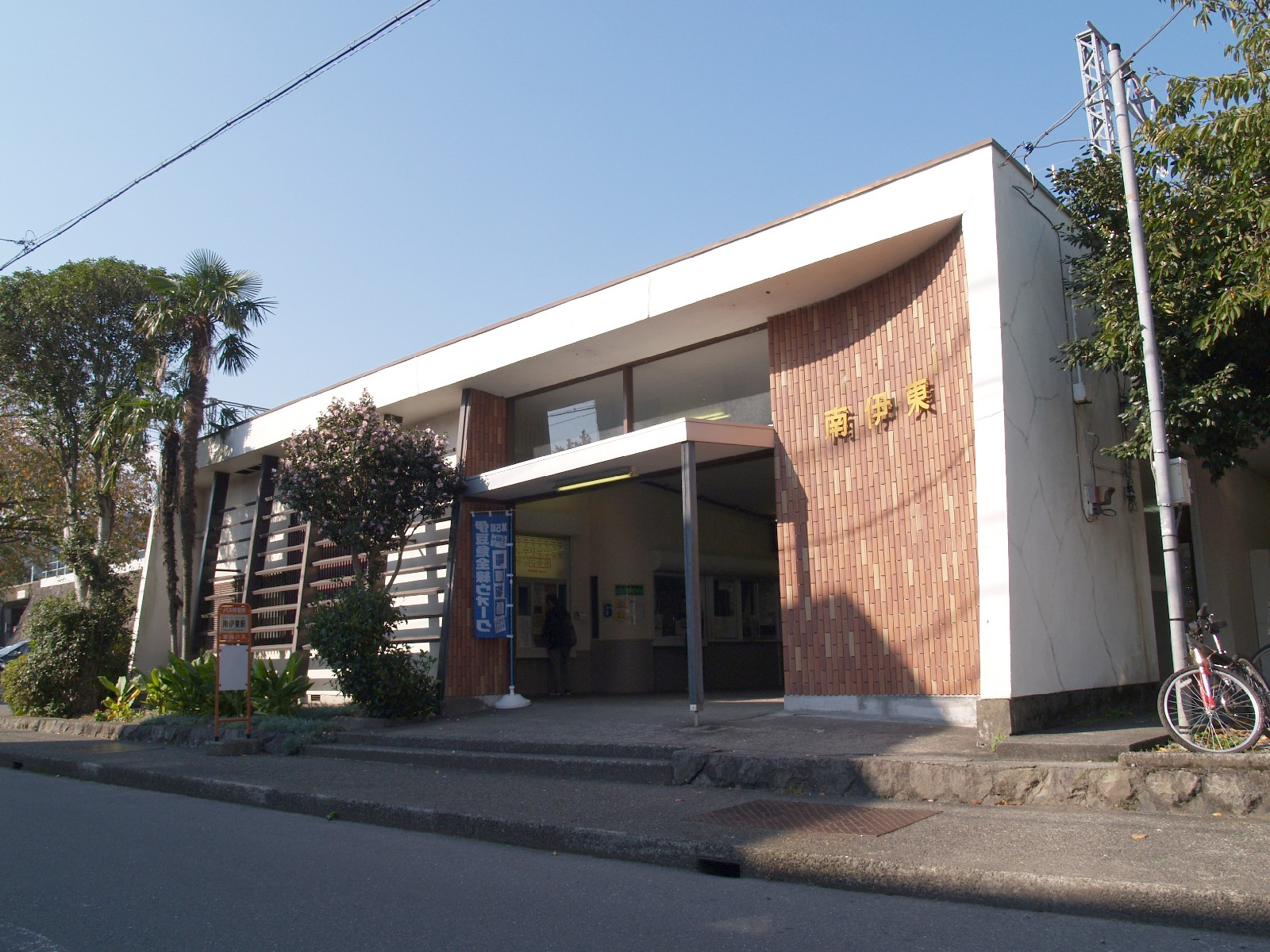
- Minami-Itō Station in November 2008

General information
- Location: 1, Sakuragaoka-chō, Itō-shi, Shizuoka-ken 414-0037; Japan
- Coordinates: 34.95775°N 139.088139°E
- Operator: Izukyū Corporation
- Line: ■ Izu Kyūkō Line
- Distance: 2.0 kilometers from Itō
- Platforms: 1 island platforms

Other information
- Status: Staffed
- Station code: IZ02
- Website: Official website

History
- Opened: December 10, 1961

Passengers
- FY2017: 601 daily
Location
- Location within Shizuoka Prefecture Location within Japan

Minami-Itō Station (南伊東駅, Minami-Itō-eki) is a railway station located in the central part of Itō, Shizuoka Prefecture, Japan operated by the private railroad company Izukyū Corporation.

== Lines ==
Minami-Itō Station is served by the Izu Kyūkō Line, and is located 2.0 kilometers from the starting point of the line at Itō Station and 18.9 kilometers from Atami Station.

== Station layout ==
Minami-Itō Station has a single elevated island platform, with the station building underneath. The station is staffed.

=== Platforms ===
| 1 | ■ Izu Kyūkō Line | Izu-Kōgen ・ Izu-Atagawa ・ Izu-Inatori ・ Kawazu ・ Izukyū Shimoda |
| 2 | ■ Izu Kyūkō Line | Itō ・ Atami |

== Adjacent stations ==
| « | Service | » |
Izu Kyūkō Line
| Itō | - | Kawana |

== History ==
Minami-Itō Station was opened on December 10, 1961.

== Passenger statistics ==
In fiscal 2017, the station was used by an average of 601 passengers daily (boarding passengers only).

== Surrounding area ==
- Itō City Hospital

== See also ==
- List of railway stations in Japan
