= Siege of Odawara =

Odawara Castle in today's Odawara city, Kanagawa Prefecture, Japan, was besieged three times.

- Siege of Odawara (1561) - a two-month siege by Uesugi Kenshin, which was abandoned when Takeda Shingen threatened Kenshin's territories
- Siege of Odawara (1569) - a three-day failed siege by Takeda Shingen
- Siege of Odawara (1590) - the castle fell to the forces of Toyotomi Hideyoshi, marking an end to the power of the Hōjō clan
