= Hotaruda Station =

Railway station in Odawara, Kanagawa Prefecture, Japan

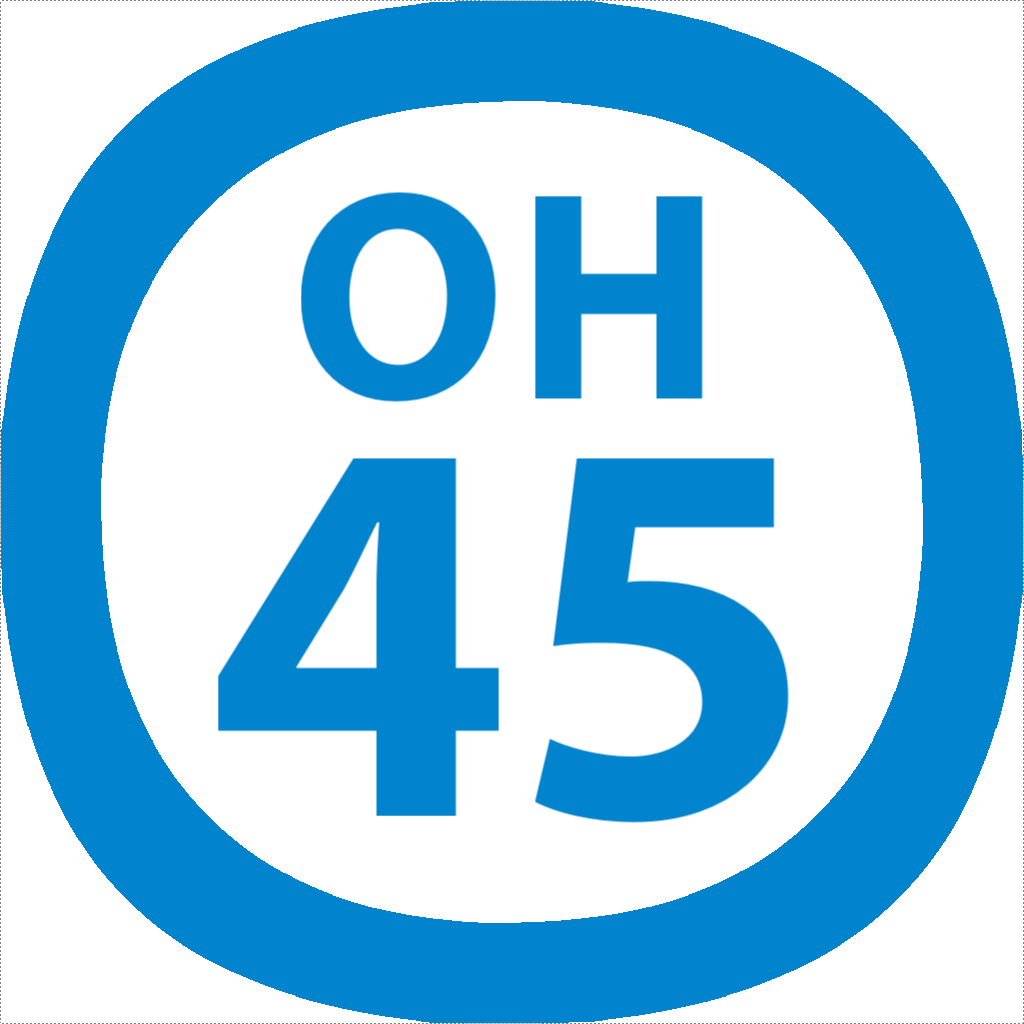
Hotaruda Station 螢田駅

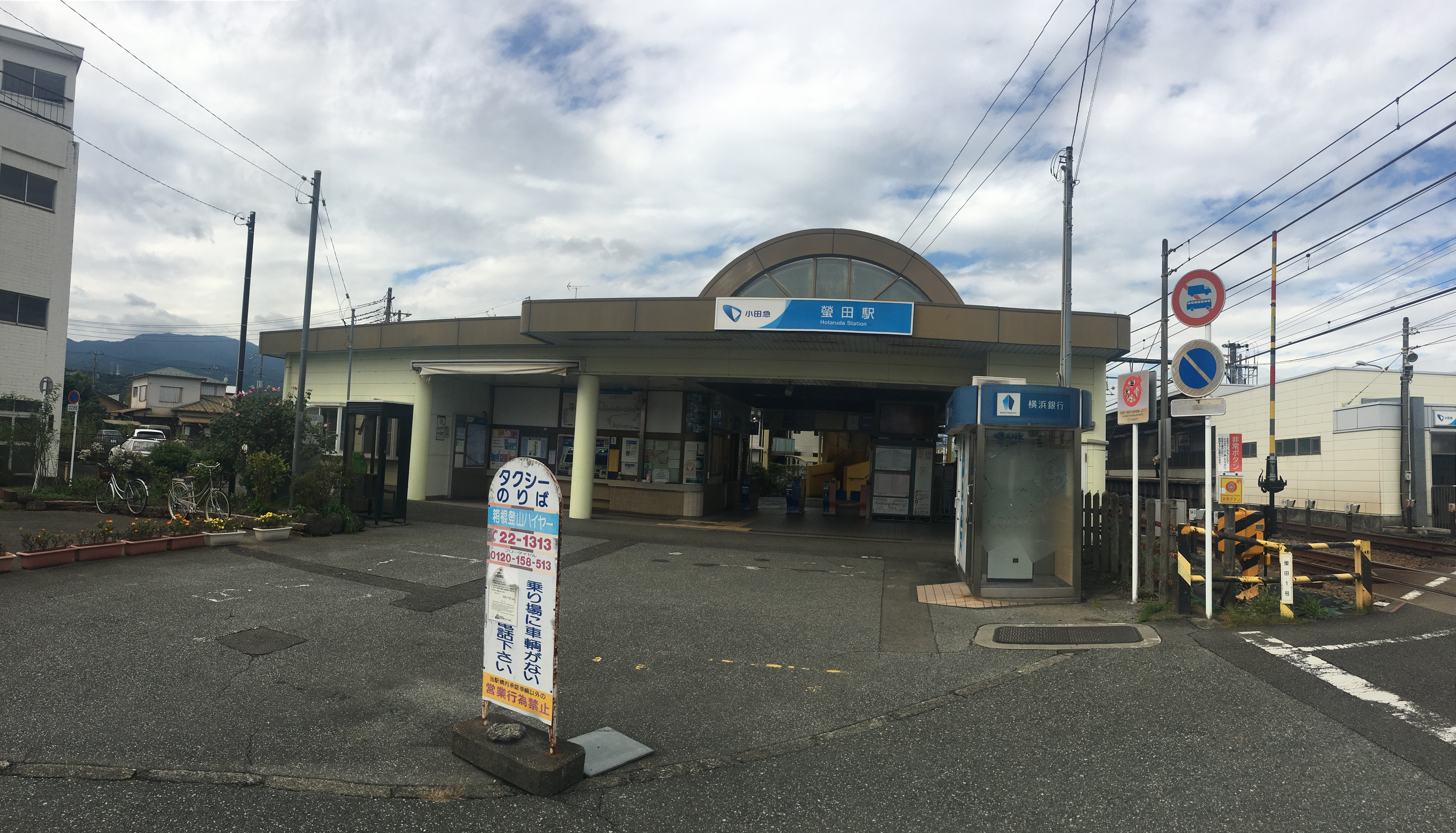
- Hotaruda Station west exit, October 2022

General information
- Location: 319 Renshoji, Odawara-shi, Kanagawa-ken 250-0865; Japan
- Coordinates: 35°17′06″N 139°09′07″E
- Operator: Odakyu Electric Railway
- Line: Odakyu Tama Line
- Distance: 79.2 km from Shinjuku.
- Platforms: 2 side platforms

Other information
- Station code: OH45
- Website: Official website

History
- Opened: 1 April 1952; 74 years ago

Passengers
- FY2019: 6049 daily

Services
Preceding station	Odakyu	Following station
Ashigara towards Odawara	Odawara Line Local	Tomizu towards Shinjuku or Yoyogi-Uehara
Location
- Location within Kanagawa Prefecture Location within Japan

Hotaruda Station (螢田駅, Hotaruda-eki) is a passenger railway station located in the city of Odawara, Kanagawa Prefecture, Japan, operated by the private railway operator Odakyu Electric Railway.

== Lines ==
Hotaruda Station is served by the Odakyu Odawara Line, and is located 79.2 kilometers from the line’s terminus at Shinjuku Station.

== Station layout ==
Hotaruda Station has two opposed side platforms with three tracks, connected to the station building by a footbridge.

=== Platforms ===
1	■ Odakyu Odawara Line	Westbound (For Odawara, Hakone-Yumoto)
2	■ Odakyu Odawara Line	Eastbound (For Shin-Matsuda, Sagami-Ono, Shin-Yurigaoka, Chiyoda line Ayase, and Shinjuku)

== History ==
Hotaruda Station opened on 1 April 1952.

Station numbering was introduced in January 2014 with Hotaruda being assigned station number OH45.

== Passenger statistics ==
In fiscal 2019, the station was used by an average of 6,059 passengers daily.

The passenger figures for previous years are as shown below.

Fiscal year	daily average
2005	5,672
2010	5,862
2015	6,241

== Surrounding area ==
- Izumi Junior High School
- Higashi Tomimizu Elementary School

== See also ==
- List of railway stations in Japan
