= Tomizu Station =

Railway station in Odawara, Kanagawa Prefecture, Japan

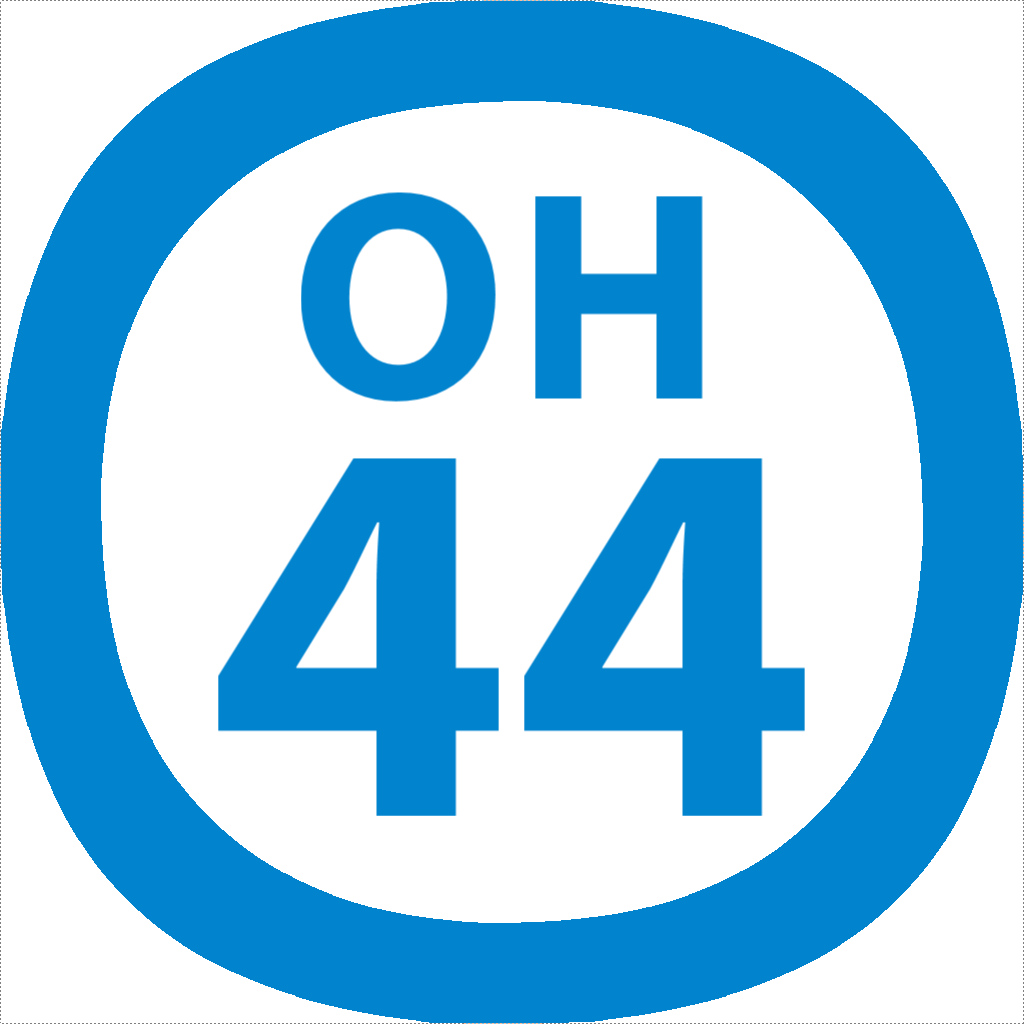
Tomizu Station 富水駅

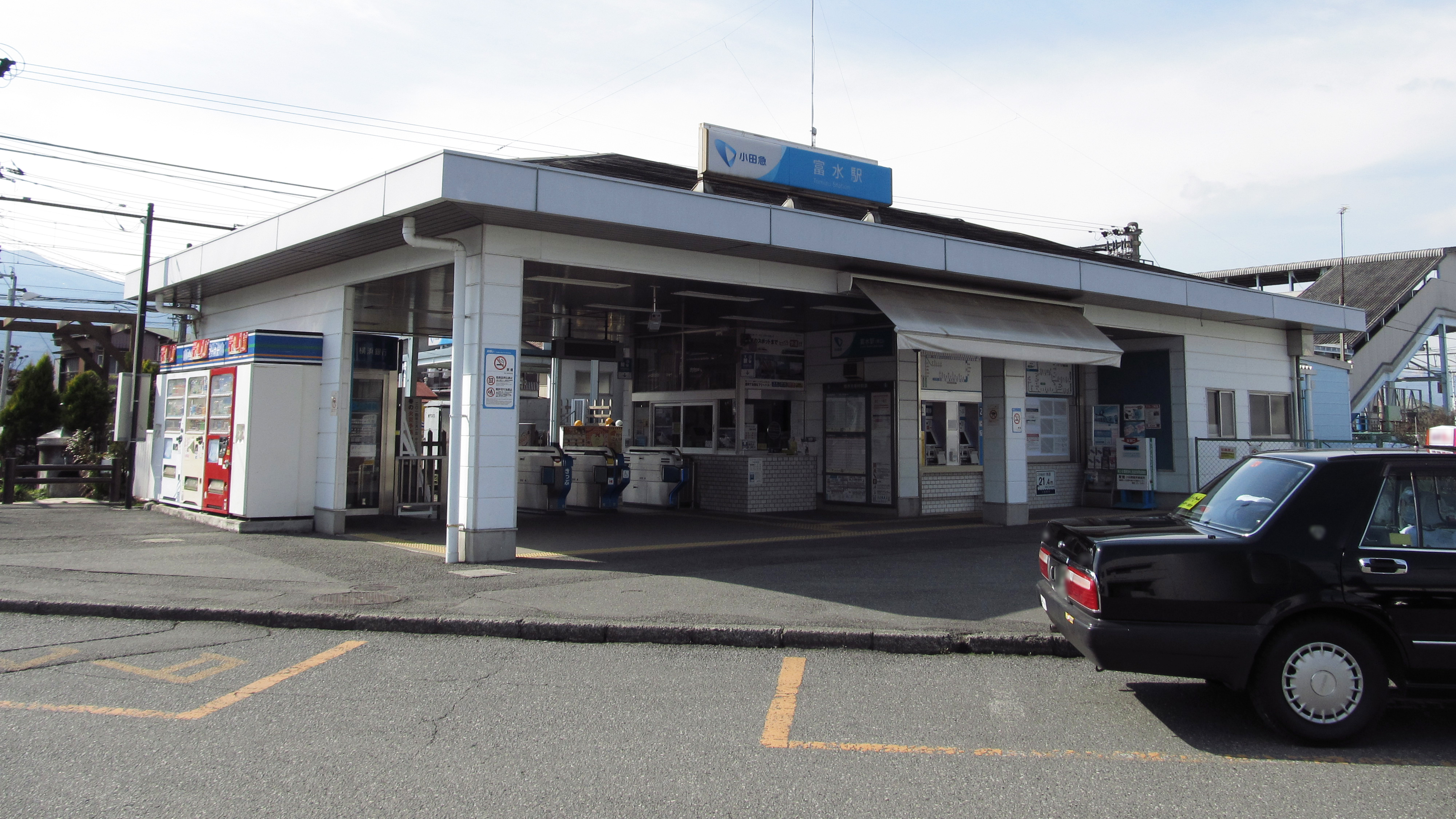
- Tomizu Station, March 2014

General information
- Location: Horinouchi 242, Odawara-shi, Kanagawa-kn 250-0853; Japan
- Coordinates: 35°17′47″N 139°08′44″E
- Operator: Odakyu Electric Railway
- Line: Odakyu Odawara Line
- Distance: 77.8 km from Shinjuku.
- Platforms: 2 side platforms
- Connections: Bus terminal

Other information
- Station code: OH44
- Website: Official website

History
- Opened: 1 April 1927; 99 years ago

Passengers
- FY2019: 6,796 daily

Services
Preceding station	Odakyu	Following station
Hotaruda towards Odawara	Odawara Line Local	Kayama towards Shinjuku or Yoyogi-Uehara
Location
- Location within Kanagawa Prefecture Location within Japan

Tomizu Station (富水駅, Tomizu-eki) is a passenger railway station located in the city of Odawara, Kanagawa Prefecture, Japan, operated by the Odakyu Electric Railway.

== Lines ==
Tomizu Station is served by the Odakyu Odawara Line, and is located 77.8 kilometers from the line’s terminus at Shinjuku Station.

== Station layout ==
The station consists of two opposed side platforms with two tracks, connected to the station building by a footbridge.

=== Platforms ===
1	■ Odakyu Odawara Line	Westbound (For Odawara, Hakone-Yumoto)
2	■ Odakyu Odawara Line	Eastbound (For Shin-Matsuda, Sagami-Ono, Shin-Yurigaoka, Chiyoda line Ayase, and Shinjuku)

== History ==
Tomizu Station was opened on April 1, 1927 on the Odakyu Odawara Line of the Odakyu Electric Railway with direct express service only to Shinjuku. The station became a stop on regularly scheduled normal services only from June 1945. Limited express services were resumed from 1946, and commuter express services from 1960-1964.

Station numbering was introduced in January 2014 with Tomizu being assigned station number OH44.

== Passenger statistics ==
In fiscal 2019, the station was used by an average of 6,796 passengers daily.

The passenger figures for previous years are as shown below.

Fiscal year	daily average
2005	6,664
2010	6,711
2015	6,899

== Surrounding area ==
- Odawara City Hall Sakurai branch office
- Birthplace of Ninomiya Sontoku

== See also ==
- List of railway stations in Japan
