= Hayakawa Station =

Railway station in Odawara, Kanagawa Prefecture, Japan

JT17 Hayakawa Station 早川駅
- Hayakawa Station building, 2026

General information
- Location: 1-16-1 Hayakawa, Odawara City, Kanagawa Prefecture 250-002; Japan
- Coordinates: 35.239085°N 139.145368°E
- Operator: JR East
- Line: Tōkaidō Line
- Distance: 86.0 km (53.4 mi) from Tokyo.
- Platforms: 1 island platform
- Tracks: 2
- Connections: Bus terminal

Construction
- Structure type: At grade

Other information
- Status: Staffed
- Station code: JT17
- Website: Official website

History
- Opened: 21 December 1922; 103 years ago

Passengers
- FY2019: 1,386 daily

Services
Preceding station	JR East	Following station
Nebukawa JT18 towards Atami	Tōkaidō Line	Odawara JT16 towards Tokyo
Location
- Location within Kanagawa Prefecture Location within Kanto Area Location within Japan

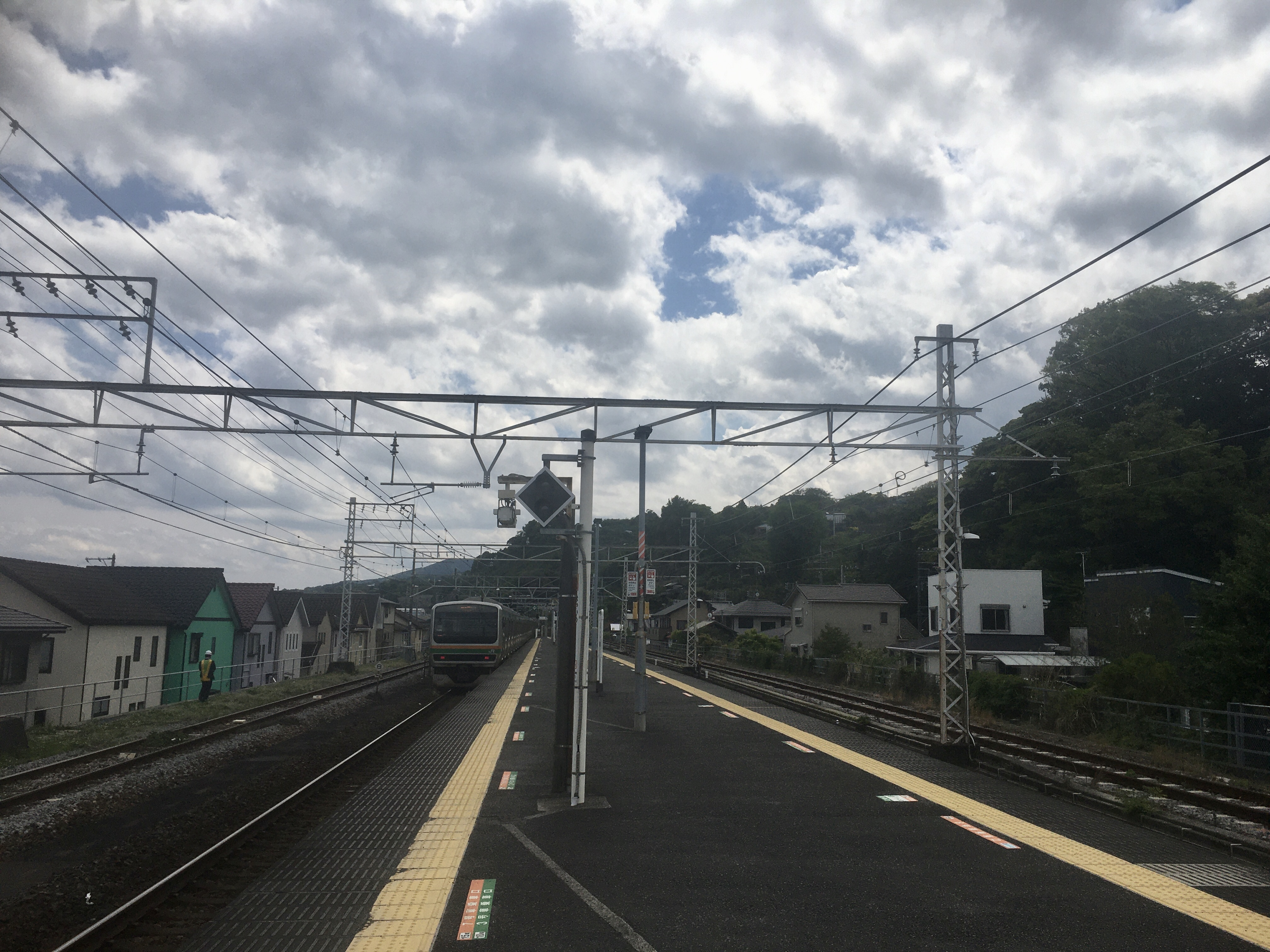
Station platform, 2022

Hayakawa Station (早川駅, Hayakawa-eki) is a passenger railway station located in the city of Odawara, Kanagawa Prefecture, Japan, operated by the East Japan Railway Company (JR East).

== Lines ==
Hayakawa Station is served by the Tōkaidō Main Line, and is located 86.0 kilometers from the line's terminus at Tokyo Station.

== Station layout ==
The station consists of a single island platform, connected to the station building by a footbridge. The platform is too short to accommodate trains longer than 15 cars in length, so a door cut system is employed. The station is attended.

=== Platforms ===
1	Tōkaidō Line	for Atami, Mishima, Numazu; Itō Line for Itō
2	Tōkaidō Line・Ueno-Tokyo Line	for Odawara, Yokohama, Tokyo; Utsunomiya Line for Utsunomiya and Kuroiso; Takasaki Line for Takasaki and Maebashi

== Station history ==
Hayakawa Station first opened on December 21, 1922, when the section of the Atami-Odawara Line connecting Odawara with Manazuru was completed. From December 1, 1934 this became the Tōkaidō Main Line. Regularly scheduled freight services were discontinued in 1959, and parcel services by 1972. With the dissolution and privatization of the JNR on April 1, 1987, the station came under the control of the East Japan Railway Company. Automated turnstiles using the Suica IC Card system came into operation from November 18, 2001. The "Midori no Madoguchi" service counter was discontinued from 2007.

== Passenger statistics ==
In fiscal 2019, the station was used by an average of 1386 passengers daily.

The passenger figures (boarding passengers only) for previous years are as shown below.

Fiscal year	daily average
2005	1,589
2010	1,440
2015	1,406

== Surrounding area ==
- National Route 135
- Odawara City Hall Hayakawa Branch office
- Odawara fishing port
- Hayakawa Post Office

== See also ==
- List of railway stations in Japan
