= Ashigara Station (Kanagawa) =

Railway station in Odawara, Kanagawa Prefecture, Japan

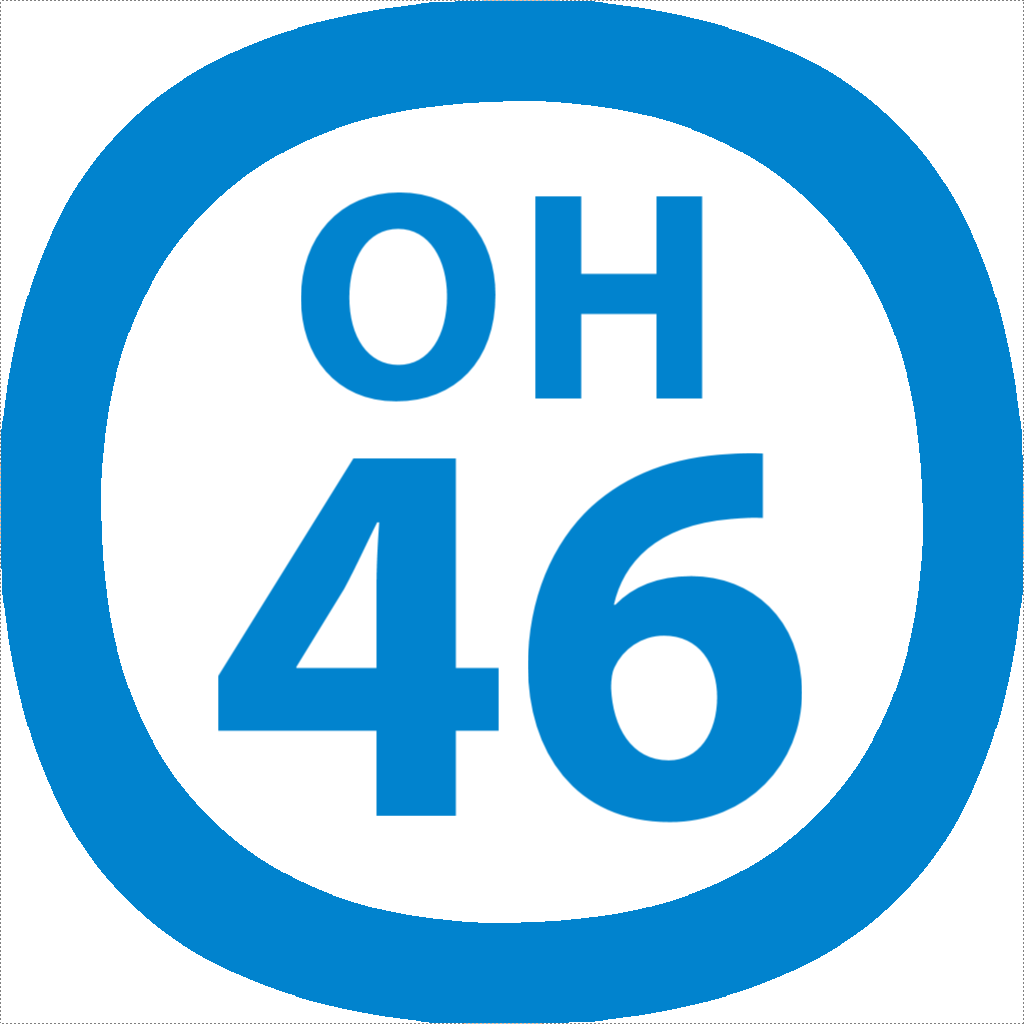
Ashigara Station 足柄駅

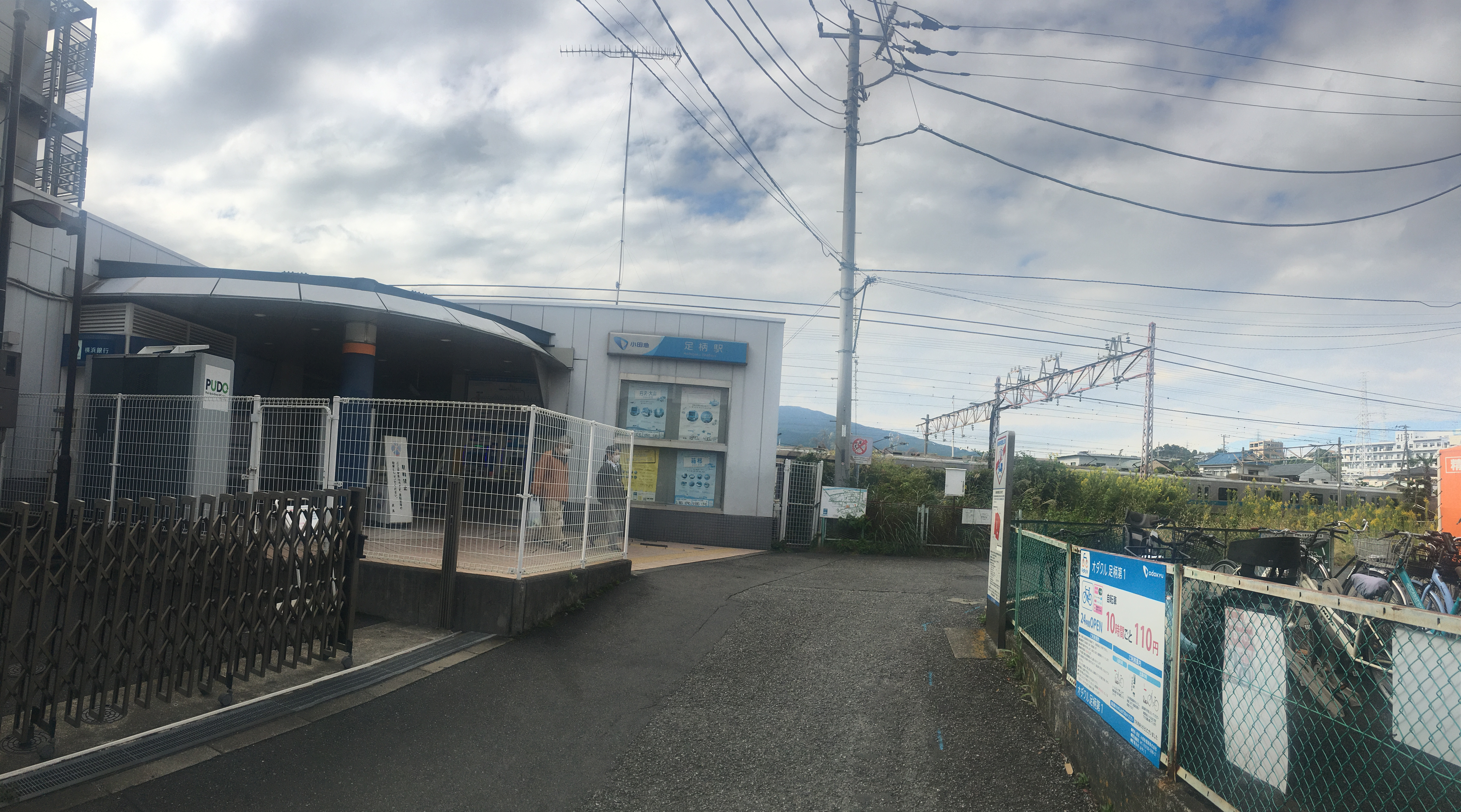
- Ashigara Station, October 2022

General information
- Location: 3-32-27 Ōgichō, Odawara-shi, Kanagawa-ken 250-0001; Japan
- Coordinates: 35°16′18″N 139°09′16″E
- Operator: Odakyu Electric Railway
- Line: Odakyu Odawara Line
- Distance: 80.8 km from Shinjuku.
- Platforms: 2 island platforms

Other information
- Station code: OH46
- Website: Official website

History
- Opened: 1 April 1927; 99 years ago

Passengers
- FY2019: 3,893 daily

Services
Preceding station	Odakyu	Following station
Odawara Terminus	Odawara Line Local	Hotaruda towards Shinjuku or Yoyogi-Uehara
Location
- Location within Kanagawa Prefecture Location within Japan

Ashigara Station (足柄駅, Ashigara-eki) is a passenger railway station located in the city of Odawara, Kanagawa Prefecture, Japan, operated by the private railway company Odakyu Electric Railway.

== Lines ==
Ashigara Station is served by the Odakyu Odawara Line, and is located 80.8 kilometers from the line's terminus at Shinjuku Station.

== Station layout ==
Ashigara Station has two island platforms and three tracks, connected to the station building by a footbridge.

=== Platforms ===
1	■ Odakyu Odawara Line	for Odawara
2	■ Odakyu Odawara Line	for Shin-Matsuda, Sagami-Ono, Shin-Yurigaoka, and Shinjuku; Tokyo Metro Chiyoda Line for Ayase
3	■ Odakyu Odawara Line	for Shin-Matsuda, Sagami-Ono, Shin-Yurigaoka, and Shinjuku; Tokyo Metro Chiyoda Line for Ayase

== History ==
Ashigara Station was opened on 1 April 1927.

Station numbering was introduced in January 2014, with Ashigara being assigned station number OH46.

== Passenger statistics ==
In fiscal 2019, the station was used by an average of 3,893 passengers daily.

The passenger figures for previous years are as shown below.

Fiscal year	Daily average
2005	2,950
2010	2,966
2015	3,624

== Surrounding area ==
- Odawara City Hall
- Odawara Municipal Hospital
- Odawara Police Station
- Ogicho Post Office

== See also ==
- List of railway stations in Japan
