= Futo Station =

Railway station in Itō, Shizuoka Prefecture, Japan

Futo Station 富戸駅
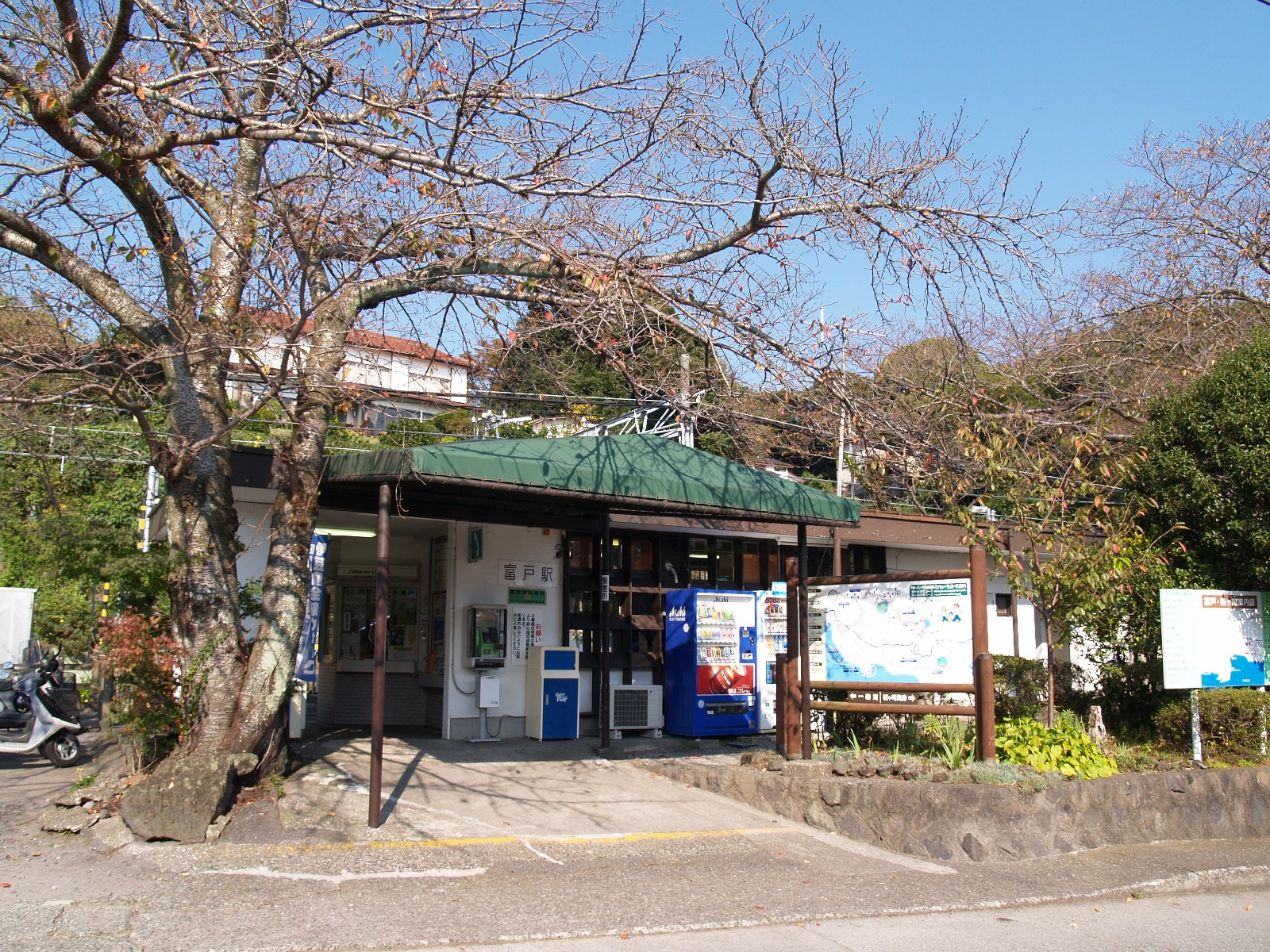
- Exterior of Futo Station in November 2008

General information
- Location: Futo, Itō-shi, Shizuoka-ken 413-0231; Japan
- Coordinates: 34°54′34″N 139°7′52″E
- Operator: Izukyū Corporation
- Line: ■ Izu Kyūkō Line
- Distance: 11.5 kilometers from Itō
- Platforms: 2 side platforms

Other information
- Status: Staffed
- Station code: IZ04
- Website: Official website

History
- Opened: December 10, 1961

Passengers
- FY2017: 190 daily
Location
- Location within Shizuoka Prefecture Location within Japan

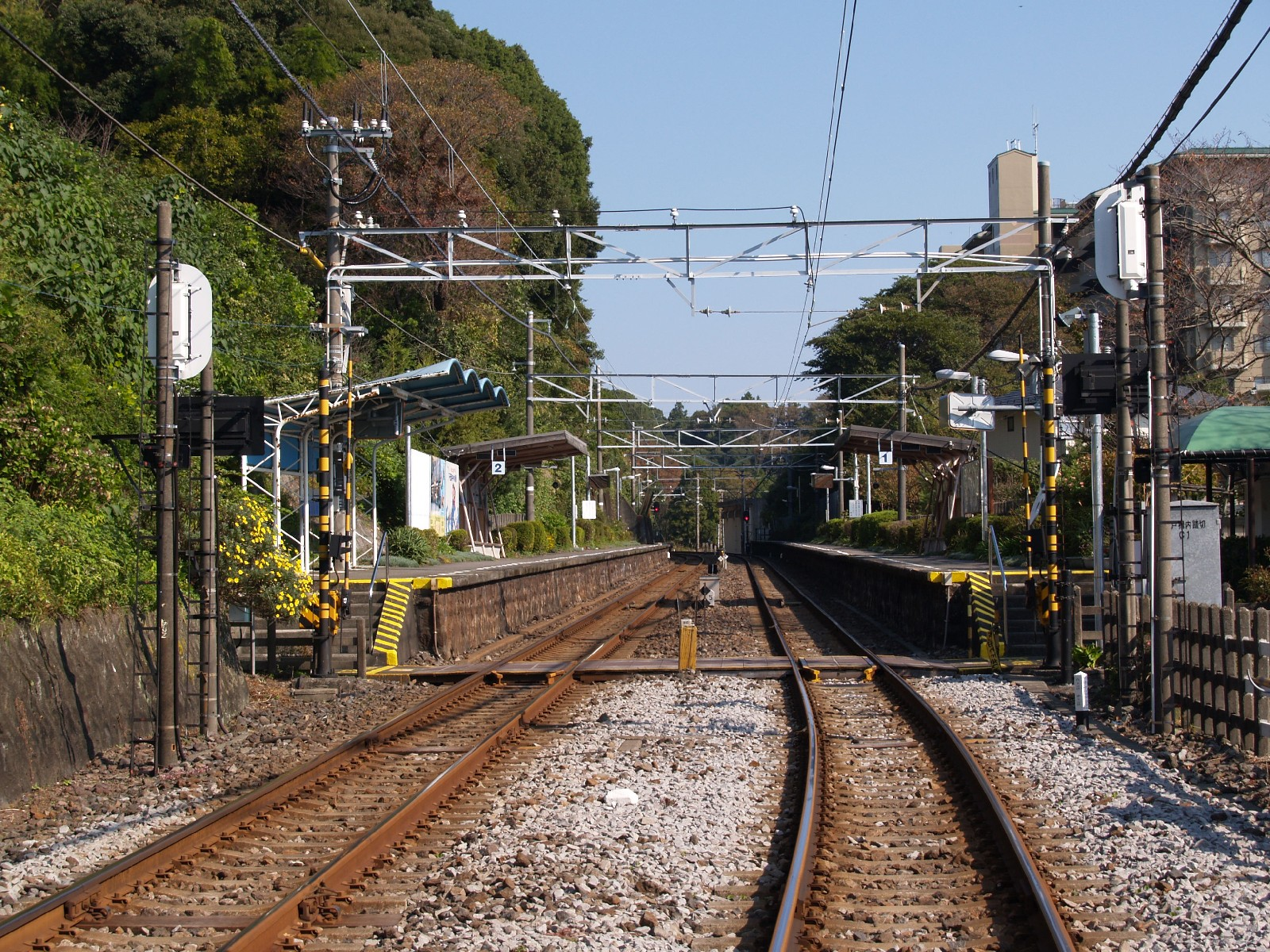
Platforms

Futo Station (富戸駅, Futo-eki) is a railway station located in the southern part of Itō, Shizuoka Prefecture, Japan operated by the private railroad company Izukyū Corporation.

== Lines ==
Futo Station is served by the Izu Kyūkō Line, and is located 11.5 kilometers from the starting point of the line at Itō Station and 28.4 kilometers from Atami Station.

== Station layout ==
The station has two opposed ground-level side platforms connected by a level crossing. The station is staffed.

=== Platforms ===
1	■ Izu Kyūkō Line	Izu-Kōgen ・ Izu-Atagawa ・ Kawazu ・ Izukyū Shimoda
2	■ Izu Kyūkō Line	Itō ・ Atami

== Adjacent stations ==
«	Service	»
Izu Kyūkō Line
Kawana	Local	Jōgasaki-Kaigan

== History ==
Futo Station was opened on December 10, 1961.

== Station layout ==
Futo Station has two ground-level side platforms connected by a level crossing.

== Passenger statistics ==
In fiscal 2017, the station was used by an average of 190 passengers daily (boarding passengers only).

== Surrounding area ==
- Futo Elementary School

== See also ==
- List of railway stations in Japan
