= Odawara Women's Junior College =

Coordinates: 35°14′57″N 139°08′59″E

- 小田原女子短期大学; Odawara joshi tanki daigaku
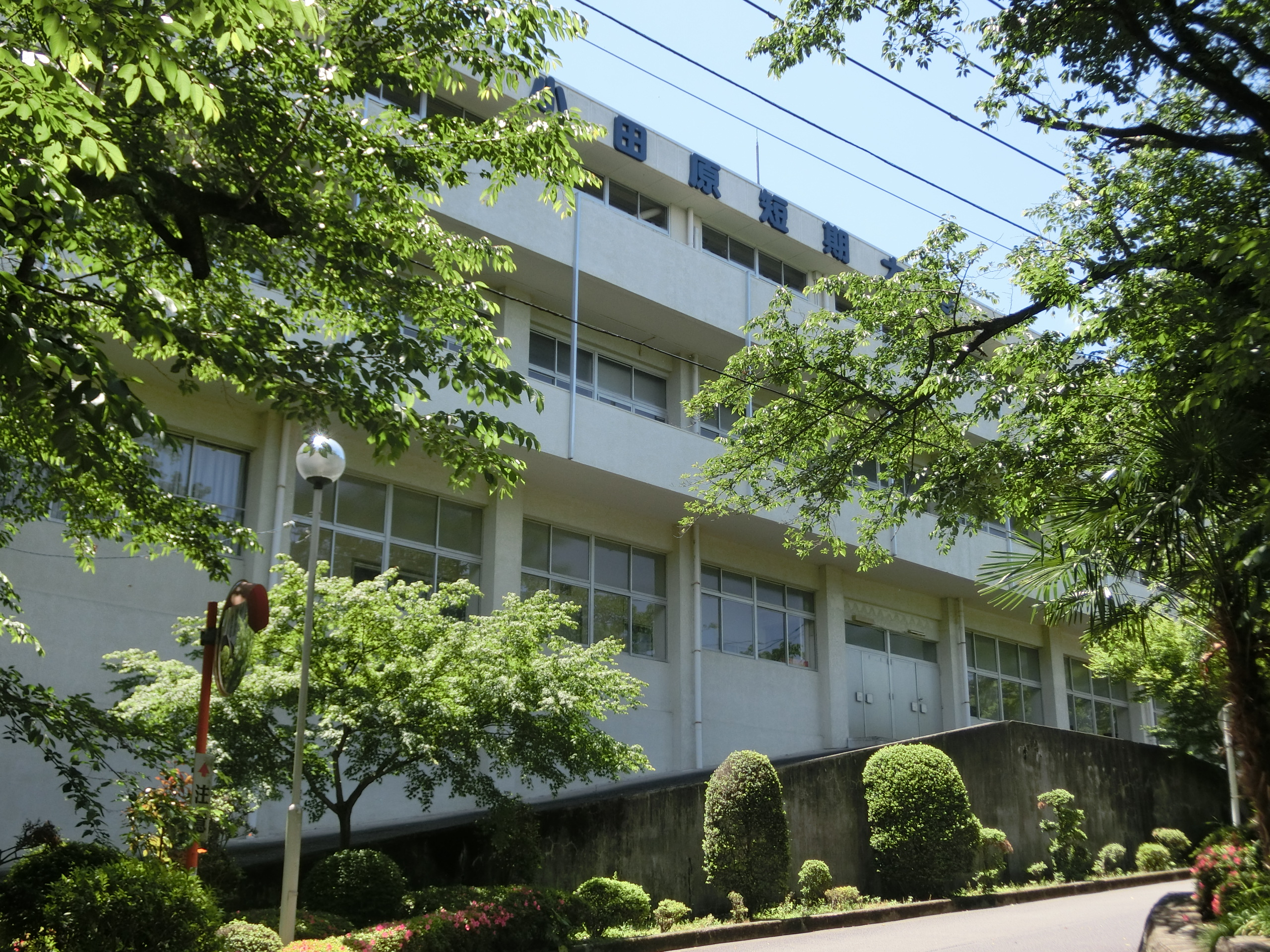
- Odawara Women's Junior College
- Type: Private
- Established: 1956
- Location: Odawara, Kanagawa, Kanagawa, Japan
- Website: Official website

Odawara Women's Junior College (小田原女子短期大学, Odawara joshi tanki daigaku) is a private women's junior college in Odawara Kanagawa Prefecture, Japan.

Established in 1956, the school specializes in nutrition studies and child care.
