= Kayama Station =

Railway station in Odawara, Kanagawa Prefecture, Japan

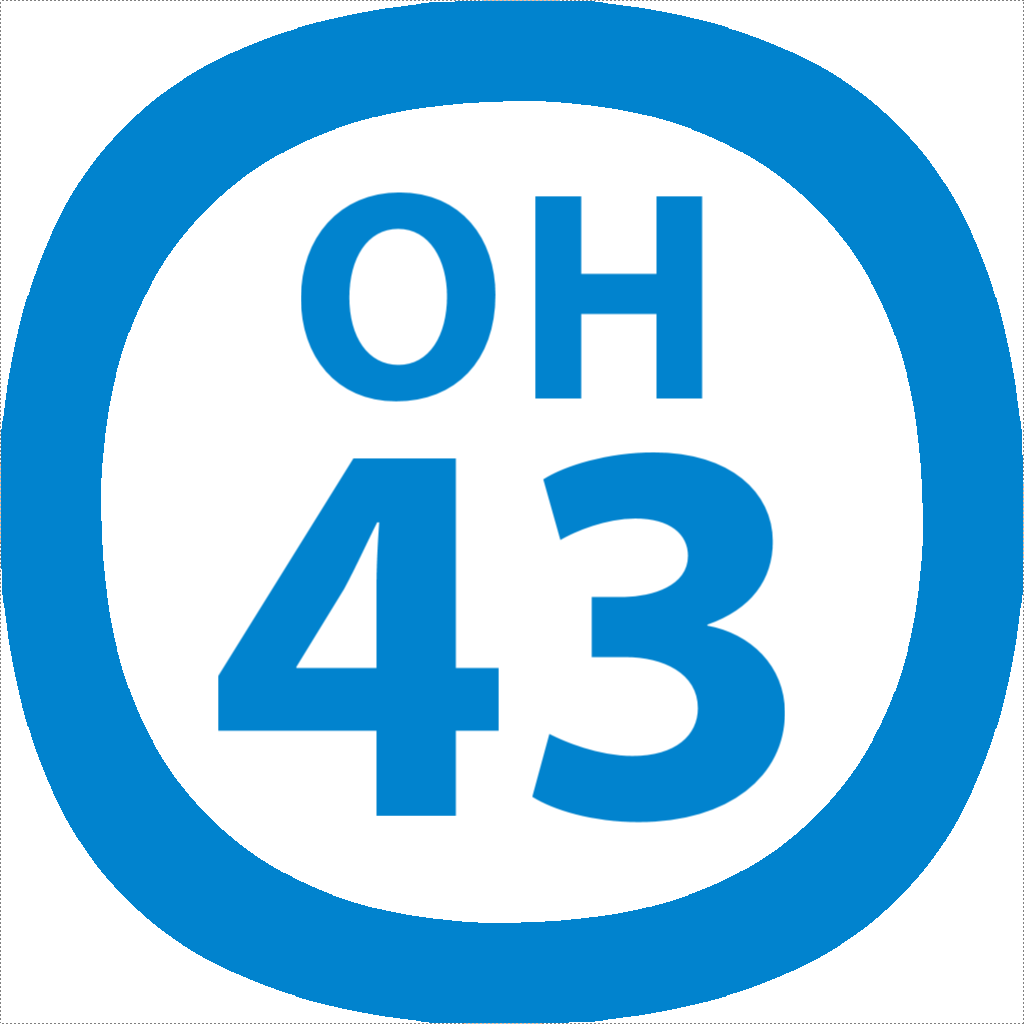
Kayama Station 栢山駅

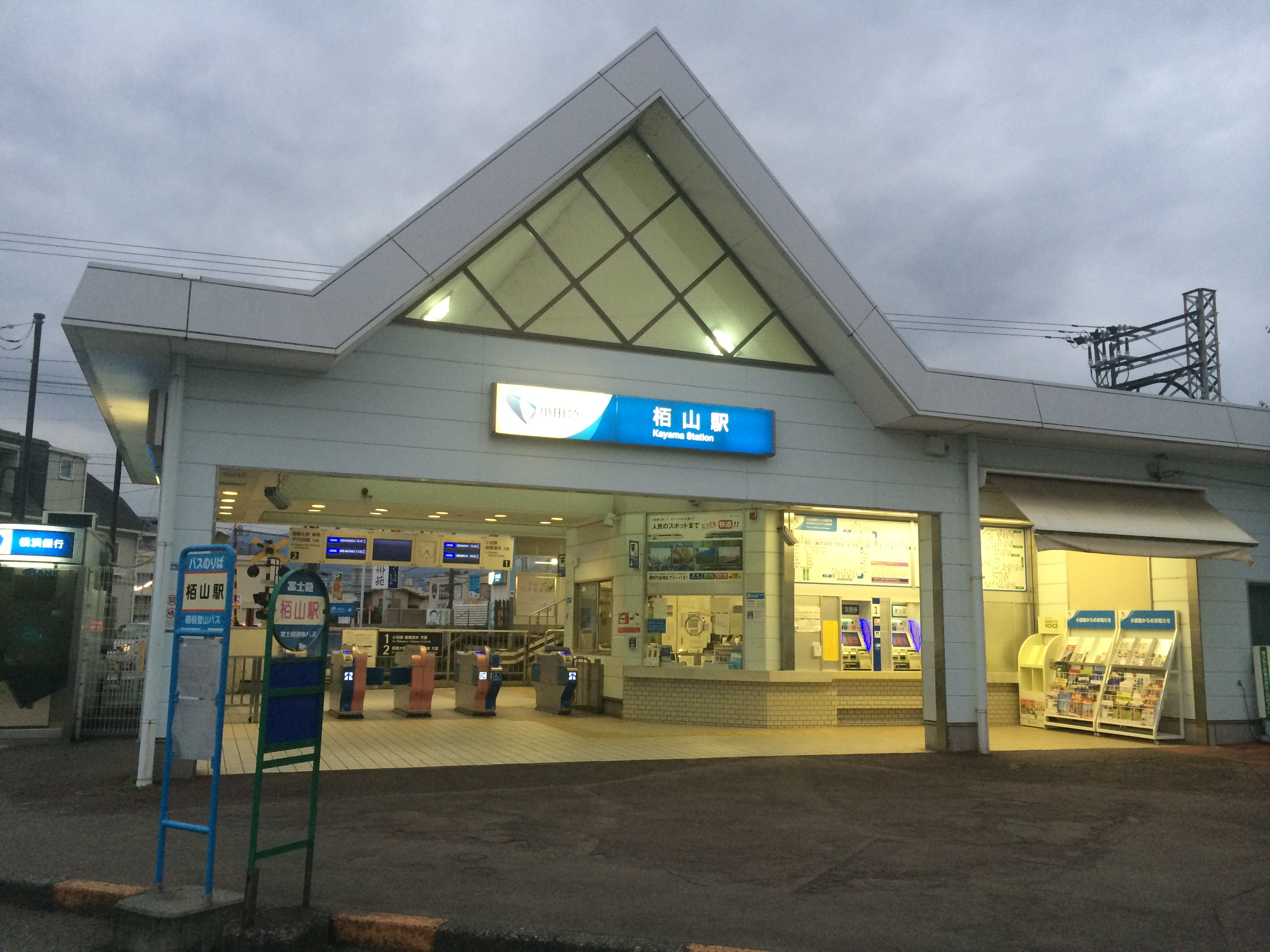
- Kayama Station, October 2016

General information
- Location: Kayama 2636, Odawara-shi, Kanagawa-ken 250-0852; Japan
- Coordinates: 35°18′37″N 139°08′34″E
- Operator: Odakyu Electric Railway
- Line: Odakyu Tama Line
- Distance: 76.2 km from Shinjuku.
- Platforms: 2 side platforms
- Connections: Bus terminal

Other information
- Station code: OH43
- Website: Official website

History
- Opened: 1 April 1927; 99 years ago

Passengers
- FY2019: 8589 daily

Services
Preceding station	Odakyu	Following station
Tomizu towards Odawara	Odawara Line Local	Kaisei towards Shinjuku or Yoyogi-Uehara
Location
- Location within Kanagawa Prefecture Location within Japan

Kayama Station (栢山駅, Kayama-eki) is a passenger railway station located in the city of Odawara, Kanagawa Prefecture, Japan, operated by the Odakyu Electric Railway.

== Lines ==
Kayama Station is served by the Odakyu Odawara Line, and is located 76.2 kilometers from the line's terminus at Shinjuku Station.

== Station layout ==
The station consists of two opposed side platforms with two tracks, connected to the station building by a footbridge.

=== Platforms ===
1	■ Odakyu Odawara Line	Westbound (For Odawara, Hakone-Yumoto)
2	■ Odakyu Odawara Line	Eastbound (For Shin-Matsuda, Sagami-Ono, Shin-Yurigaoka, Chiyoda line Ayase, and Shinjuku)

== History ==
Kayama Station was opened on 1 April 1927 on the Odakyu Odawara Line of the Odakyu Electric Railway with direct express service only to Shinjuku. The station became a stop on regularly scheduled normal services only from June 1945. Limited express services were resumed from 1946, and commuter express services from 1960 to 1964.

Station numbering was introduced in January 2014 with Kayama being assigned station number OH43.

== Passenger statistics ==
In fiscal 2019, the station was used by an average of 8,589 passengers daily.

The passenger figures for previous years are as shown below.

Average daily boarding/alighting/number of passengers by fiscal year
Fiscal year	daily average	Number of passengers
1995年（平成7年）		
1998年（平成10年）		5,821
1999年（平成11年）		5,638
2000年（平成12年）		5,196
2001年（平成13年）		5,072
2002年（平成14年）		4,872
2003年（平成15年）	9,284	4,693
2004年（平成16年）	9,048	4,636
2005年（平成17年）	9,034	4,623
2006年（平成18年）	9,139	4,681
2007年（平成19年）	9,518	4,859
2008年（平成20年）	9,554	4,865
2009年（平成21年）	9,398	4,773
2010年（平成22年）	9,316	4,725
2011年（平成23年）	9,328	4,725
2012年（平成24年）	9,379	4,749
2013年（平成25年）	9,650	4,885
2014年（平成26年）	9,310	4,697
2015年（平成27年）	9,372	4,726
2016年（平成28年）	9,287	4,680
2017年（平成29年）	9,112	4,591
2018年（平成30年）	8,921	4,496
2019年（令和元年）	8,589	4,337
2020年（令和2年）	6,474	
2021年（令和3年）	6,813	
2022年（令和4年）	7,086	

== Surrounding area ==
- Sakawa River
- Ninomiya Sontoku Memorial Museum
- Johoku Technical High School
- Sakurai Elementary School
- Johoku Junior High School
- Odawara hyakkaten

== See also ==
- List of railway stations in Japan
