= Yukihiro Kayama =

Japanese entrepreneur

Yukihiro Kayama (加山幸浩; born 1939) is a prominent Japanese technologist, entrepreneur and venture capitalist. For 36 years he worked for Mitsubishi Corporation where he rose to become division head for technology. During his time there he was responsible for returning more than 200 billion yen (more than two billion US dollars) from a seed capital of less than 10M USD. This was mainly with early-stage/charter investments in companies such as Piri, VeriSign, and NetOne Systems. Kayama was also an early adopter of Sun’s Java programming language and was instrumental in getting it into the Mitsubishi Motors division.

Upon retiring from Mitsubishi at the age of 59, he founded his own company EC-One which was the first purely Java systems integrator in Japan. EC-One listed on the JASDAQ in 2002. He retired from EC-One in 2005 and founded his own incubator/venture capital firm Fit-One Holdings.

He serves on the boards of GuardTime, MonstarLab, and Data Applications, and is advisor to China Seed Ventures (CSV).

One of the most respected observers of technology not only globally but especially for Japan, Joi Ito, believes that Kayama’s ability to support disruptive technologies before anyone else sees them makes him a man to watch. "Mr. Kayama is a unique guy with a deep understanding of technology. I think he is one of the few senior technology-focused people who is very successful and has multiple, multimillion-dollar home runs. I look forward to working on something with him soon." Ito is one of the founding shareholders of Guardtime and eventually got his wish when Kayama joined Guardtime as Chairman in 2009.

He has a master's degree in Engineering from Nihon University and is married with two children.
