= Odawara =

Odawara 小田原市
- Special city
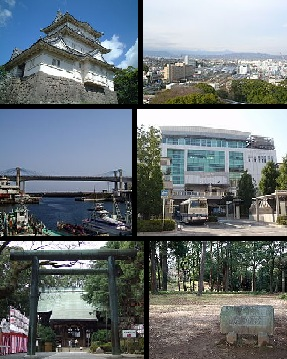
- Top left: Odawara Castle, Top right: Panorama view of Odawara, from Odawara Castle Park, Middle left: Odawara Fishing Port, Middle right: Odawara Station, Bottom left: Sontoku Ninomiya Shrine, Bottom right: Ishigakiyama Castle Park

- Flag Seal
- Location of Odawara in Kanagawa Prefecture

- Coordinates: 35°15′N 139°9′E
- Country: Japan
- Region: Kantō
- Prefecture: Kanagawa

Government
  - Mayor: Kenichi Katō (since May 2024)

Area
  - Total: 113.79 km^{2} (43.93 sq mi)

Population (September 1, 2025)
  - Total: 185,027
  - Density: 1,626.0/km^{2} (4,211.4/sq mi)
- Time zone: UTC+9 (Japan Standard Time)
- Phone number: 0465-33-1302
- Address: 300 Ogikubo, Odawara-shi, Kanagawa-ken 250-8555
- Climate: Cfa
- Website: Official website
- Symbols
- Bird: Little tern
- Fish: Medaka, Carangidae
- Flower: Ume
- Tree: Japanese black pine

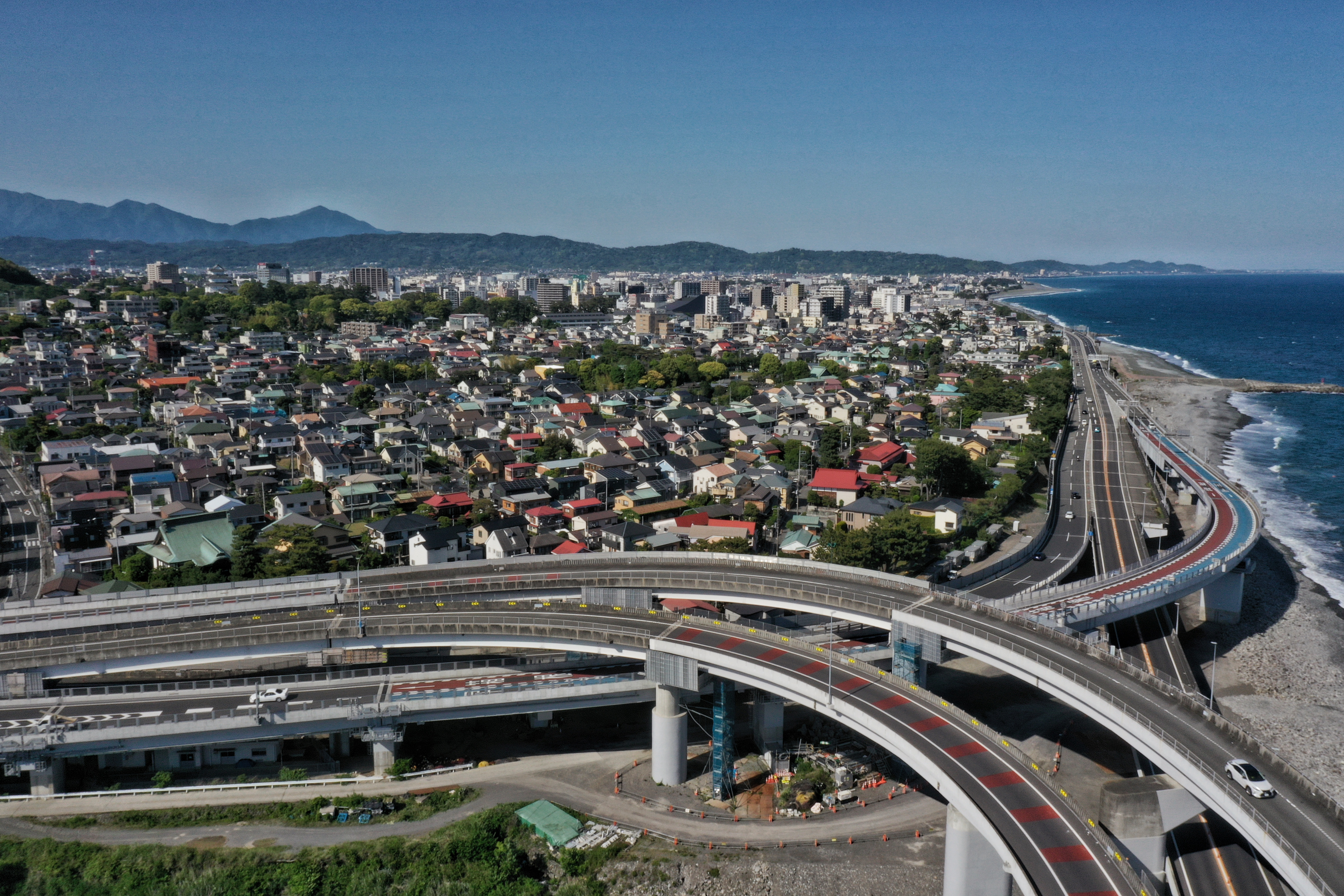
Aerial view of Odawara

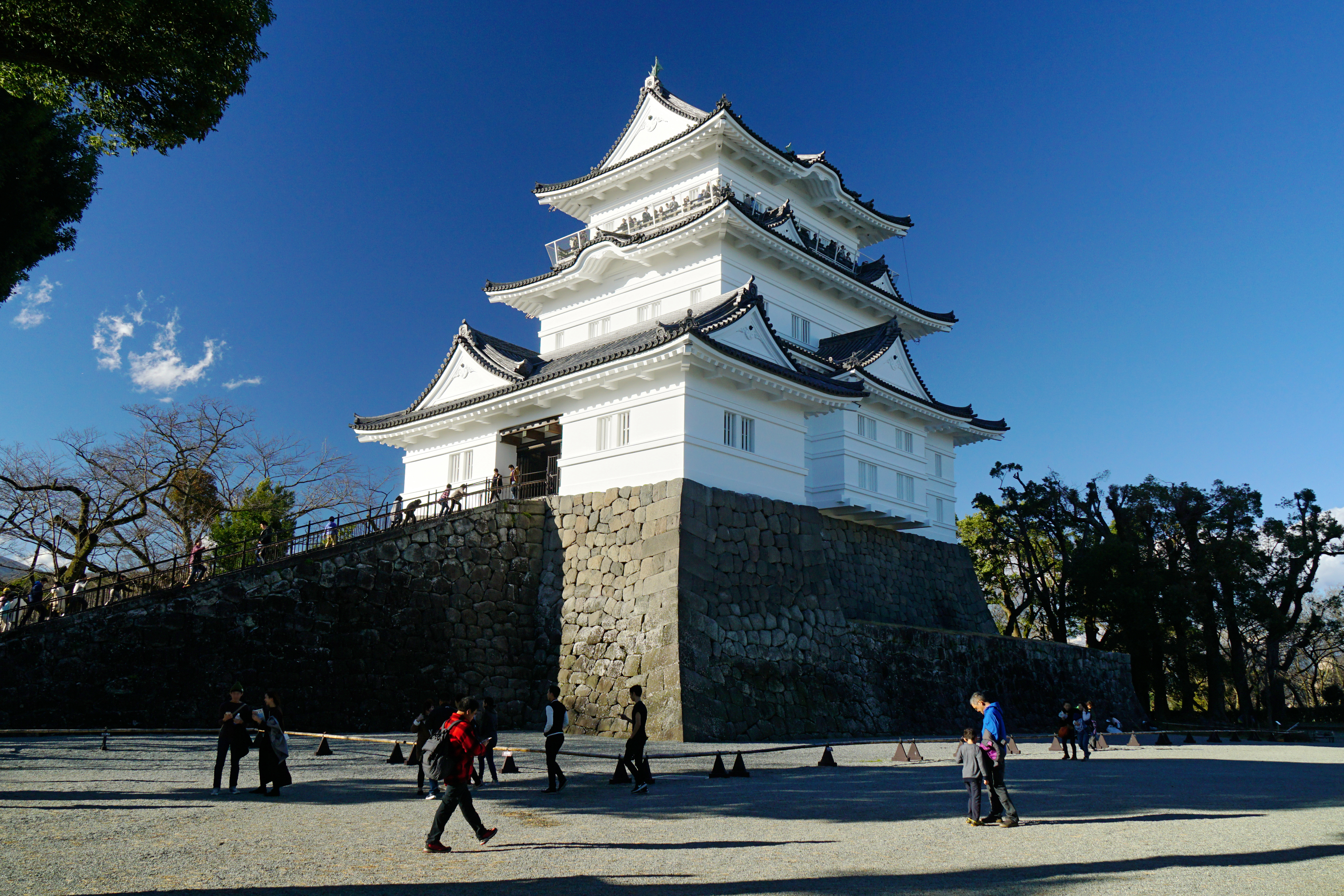
Odawara Castle

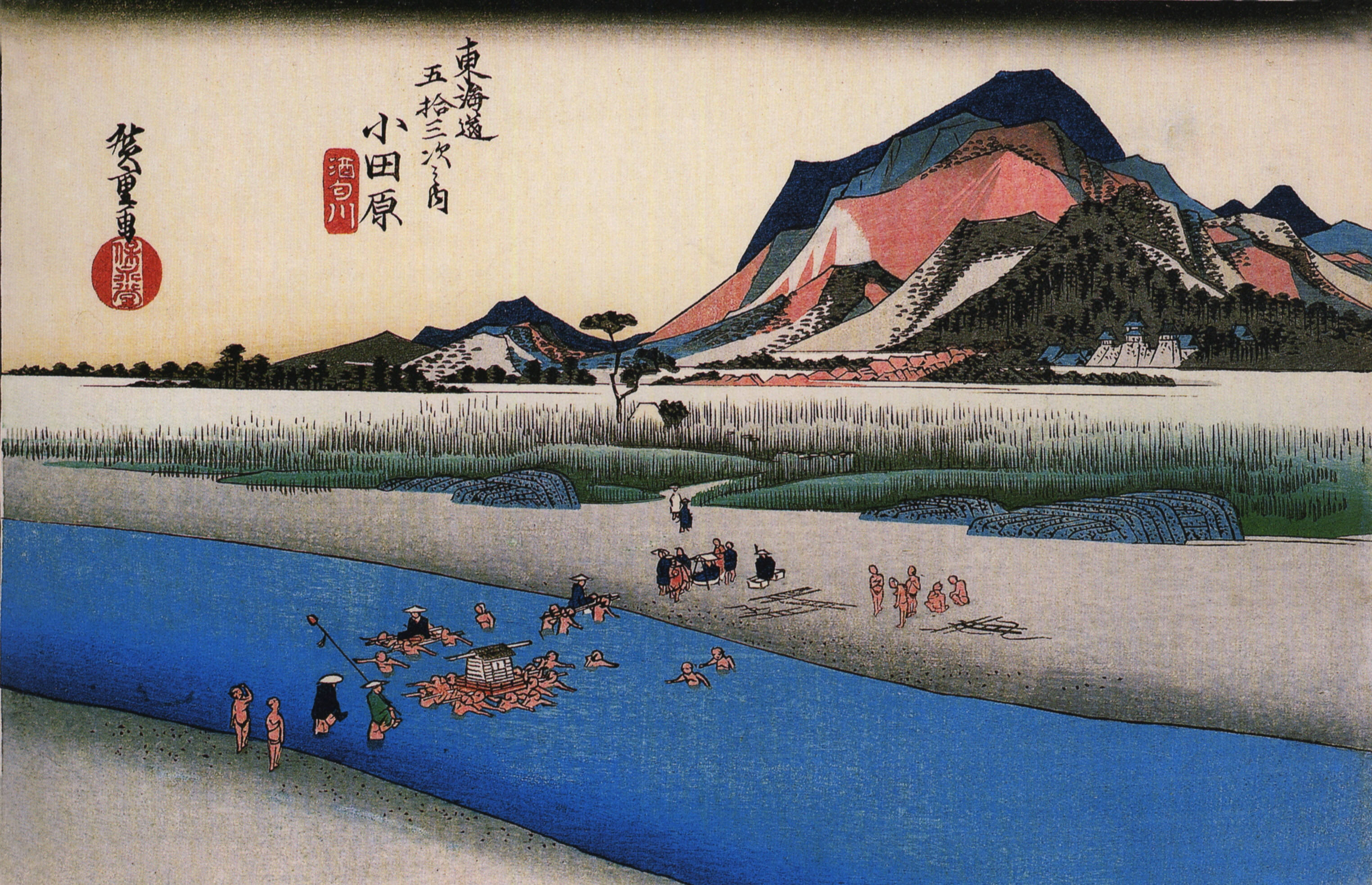
Odawara-juku in the 1830s, as depicted by Hiroshige in The Fifty-Three Stations of the Tōkaidō

Odawara (小田原市, Odawara-shi; Japanese pronunciation: [ò̞.dä́.β̞ä́.ɾä́(.ɕì)]) is a city in Kanagawa Prefecture, Japan. As of 1 September 2025, the city had an estimated population of 185,027 and a population density of 1,700 persons per km^{2}. The total area of the city is 113.79 square kilometres (43.93 sq mi).

== Geography ==
Odawara lies in the Ashigara Plains, in the far western portion of Kanagawa Prefecture at the southwestern tip of the Kantō region. It is bordered by the Hakone Mountains to the north and west, the Sakawa River to the east, and Sagami Bay of the Pacific Ocean to the south.

=== Surrounding municipalities ===
Kanagawa Prefecture

- Hakone
- Kaisei
- Manazuru
- Minamiashigara
- Nakai
- Ninomiya
- Ōi
- Yugawara

=== Climate ===
Odawara has a humid subtropical climate (Köppen Cfa) characterized by warm summers and cool winters with light to no snowfall. The average annual temperature in Odawara is 13.4 °C. The average annual rainfall is 2,144 mm with September as the wettest month. The temperatures are highest on average in August, at around 24.2 °C, and lowest in January, at around 2.9 °C.

Climate data for Odawara (1991−2020 normals, extremes 1978−present)
Month	Jan	Feb	Mar	Apr	May	Jun	Jul	Aug	Sep	Oct	Nov	Dec	Year
Record high °C (°F)	20.1 (68.2)	26.1 (79.0)	25.5 (77.9)	29.7 (85.5)	32.3 (90.1)	35.4 (95.7)	37.9 (100.2)	39.2 (102.6)	36.7 (98.1)	33.2 (91.8)	26.2 (79.2)	24.0 (75.2)	38.0 (100.4)
Mean daily maximum °C (°F)	10.6 (51.1)	11.3 (52.3)	14.1 (57.4)	18.9 (66.0)	22.8 (73.0)	25.2 (77.4)	29.0 (84.2)	30.6 (87.1)	27.2 (81.0)	22.2 (72.0)	17.4 (63.3)	13.0 (55.4)	20.2 (68.4)
Daily mean °C (°F)	5.3 (41.5)	6.1 (43.0)	9.2 (48.6)	14.0 (57.2)	18.2 (64.8)	21.3 (70.3)	25.2 (77.4)	26.4 (79.5)	23.0 (73.4)	17.8 (64.0)	12.6 (54.7)	7.8 (46.0)	15.6 (60.0)
Mean daily minimum °C (°F)	0.6 (33.1)	1.3 (34.3)	4.4 (39.9)	9.2 (48.6)	13.8 (56.8)	18.0 (64.4)	22.0 (71.6)	23.0 (73.4)	19.6 (67.3)	14.1 (57.4)	8.3 (46.9)	3.1 (37.6)	11.5 (52.6)
Record low °C (°F)	−5.7 (21.7)	−8.0 (17.6)	−4.4 (24.1)	−0.9 (30.4)	4.8 (40.6)	11.1 (52.0)	14.1 (57.4)	16.0 (60.8)	10.4 (50.7)	4.2 (39.6)	−0.4 (31.3)	−3.8 (25.2)	−8.0 (17.6)
Average precipitation mm (inches)	83.7 (3.30)	89.5 (3.52)	175.6 (6.91)	181.7 (7.15)	182.2 (7.17)	219.3 (8.63)	216.0 (8.50)	167.2 (6.58)	248.7 (9.79)	238.7 (9.40)	119.5 (4.70)	74.7 (2.94)	1,996.5 (78.60)
Average precipitation days (≥ 1.0 mm)	6.0	6.6	11.1	10.3	10.6	12.8	11.9	9.2	12.0	10.9	8.0	6.3	115.7
Mean monthly sunshine hours	179.9	159.5	161.2	176.9	182.2	130.5	163.2	201.8	138.3	131.0	149.4	171.0	1,945
Source: Japan Meteorological Agency

== Demographics ==
Per Japanese census data, the population of Odawara peaked around the year 2000 and declined slightly since then.

Historical population
Year	Pop.	±%
1960	131,366	—
1970	163,631	+24.6%
1980	177,467	+8.5%
1990	193,417	+9.0%
2000	200,173	+3.5%
2010	198,327	−0.9%
2020	188,856	−4.8%

== History ==
The area around present-day Odawara has been settled since prehistoric times, and archaeological evidence indicates that the area had a high population density in the Jōmon period. From the Ritsuryō system of the Nara period, the area became part of Ashigarashimo District of Sagami Province. It was divided into shōen during the Heian period, mostly controlled by the Hatano clan and its branches. During the Genpei War between the Heike clan and Minamoto no Yoritomo, the Battle of Ishibashiyama was fought near present-day Odawara. During the Sengoku period, Odawara developed as a castle town and capital of the domains of the later Hōjō clan, which covered most of the Kantō region. The Hōjō were defeated by Toyotomi Hideyoshi in the Battle of Odawara in 1590, despite the impregnable reputation of Odawara Castle. The territory came under the control of Tokugawa Ieyasu. Under the Tokugawa shogunate, Odawara was the center of Odawara Domain, a feudal han ruled by a succession of daimyō. The town prospered as Odawara-juku, a post station on the Tōkaidō highway connecting Edo with Kyoto.

After the Meiji Restoration, Odawara Domain briefly became 'Odawara Prefecture', which was merged with the short-lived 'Ashigara Prefecture' before joining Kanagawa Prefecture in 1876. During this period, the center of economic and political life in Kanagawa shifted to Yokohama. Odawara suffered a strong decline in population, which was made more severe when the original route of the Tōkaidō Main Line bypassed the city in favor of the more northerly route via Gotemba.

The epicenter of the Great Kantō earthquake in 1923 was deep beneath Izu Ōshima Island in Sagami Bay. It devastated Tokyo, the port city of Yokohama, surrounding prefectures of Chiba, Kanagawa, and Shizuoka Prefectures, and caused widespread damage throughout the Kantō region. Ninety percent of the buildings in Odawara collapsed immediately, and fires burned the rubble along with anything else left standing.

Odawara regained some measure of prosperity with the opening of the Tanna Tunnel in 1934, which brought the main routing of the Tōkaidō Main Line through the city. Odawara was raised from the status of town to city on December 20, 1940. On August 15, 1945, Odawara was the last city in Japan to be bombed by Allied aircraft during World War II.

On November 1, 2000, Odawara exceeded 200,000 in population, and was proclaimed a special city with increased autonomy.

== Government ==
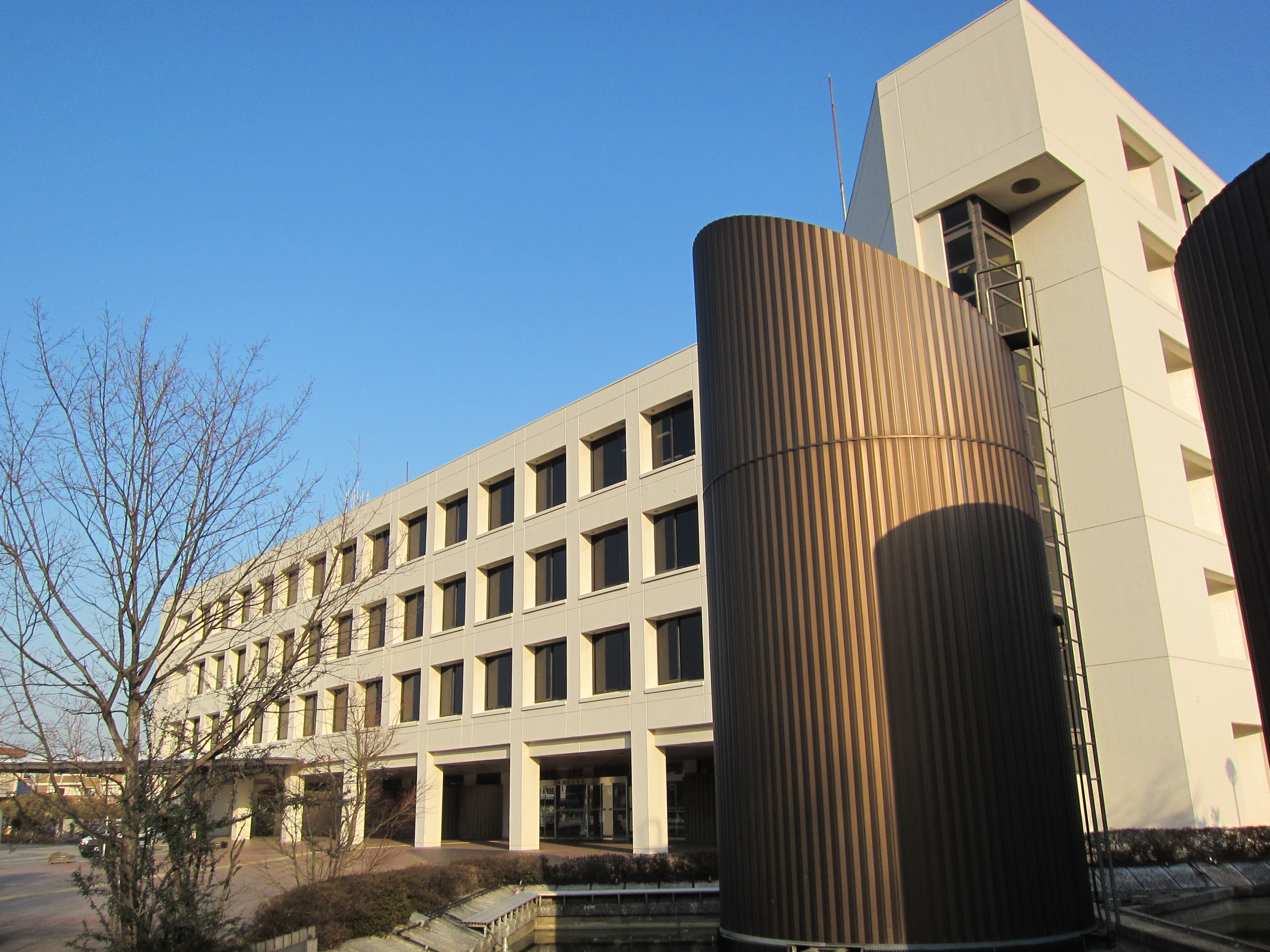
Odawara City Hall

Odawara has a mayor-council form of government with a directly elected mayor and a unicameral city council of 27 members. Odawara contributes two members to the Kanagawa Prefectural Assembly. In terms of national politics, the city is part of Kanagawa 17th district of the lower house of the Diet of Japan.

== Economy ==
Odawara is a major commercial center for western Kanagawa Prefecture. Manufacturing includes light industry, chemicals, pharmaceuticals, and food processing. Agriculture and commercial fishing play a relatively minor role in the local economy. Odawara is also a bedroom community for Yokohama and Tokyo.

Companies headquartered in Odawara include:

- Hakone Tozan Railway
- Meganesuper Co., Ltd.
- Nippon Injector Corporation
- Odawara Auto Machine MFG. Co., Ltd.
- Odakyu Hakone Holdings Co., Ltd.
- Odakyu Sharyo Kogyo Co Ltd
- Sagami Trust Bank
- Suzuhiro Co.
- Wako Pure Chemical Industries, Ltd

== Education ==
Odawara has 25 public elementary schools and 12 public middle schools operated by the city government, and four public high schools operated by the Kanagawa Prefectural Board of Education. The prefecture also operates one special education school for the handicapped.

Odawara also has one private elementary school, one private middle school, two private high schools, and a private junior college, the Odawara Women's Junior College.

== Transportation ==
=== Railway ===
JR Tōkai -Tōkaidō Shinkansen

- Odawara

JR Tōkai – Gotemba Line

- Shimo-Soga – Kōzu

JR East – Tōkaidō Main Line

- Kōzu – Kamonomiya – Odawara – Hayakawa – Nebukawa

Odakyu Electric Railway – Odakyu Odawara Line

- Kayama – Tomizu – Hotaruda – Ashigara – Odawara

Izuhakone Railway – Daiyūzan Line

- Odawara – Midorichō – Isaida – Gohyakurakan – Anabe – Iidaoka – Sagami-Numata

Hakone Tozan Railway – Hakone Tozan Line

- Odawara – Hakone-Itabashi – Kazamatsuri – Iriuda

=== Highway ===
- Odawara-Atsugi Road
- National Route 1, to Tokyo or Kyoto
- National Route 135, to Shimoda
- National Route 138, to Fujiyoshida
- National Route 255, to Hadano
- National Route 271], to Atsugi (toll)

=== Bus ===
- Bus service to Izu Peninsula

== Local attractions ==
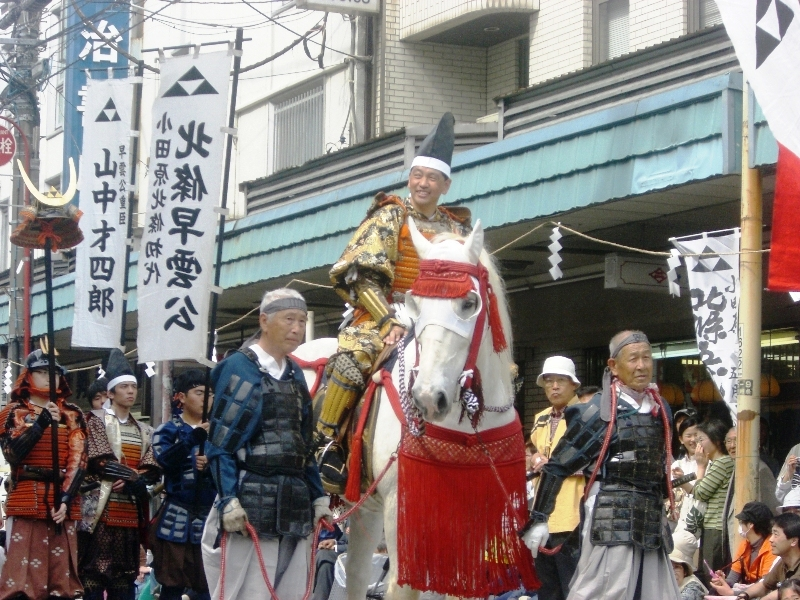
Odawara Hōjō Godai Festival(May)

Besides Odawara Castle, Odawara is a major transit point for the Hakone hot springs resort area and the sightseeing locations of the Fuji-Hakone-Izu National Park. Within the city itself, the Yugawara area is a well-known hot spring resort.

Another castle, Ishigakiyama Ichiya Castle, was built by Toyotomi Hideyoshi.

Enoura, a coastal area of Odawara known for its pristine sea, has an abundance of kumamomi, a type of fish that prefers clear and clean water. Sea turtles are sometimes present there. Because of the clear water and plentiful undersea life, many people come to Enoura for scuba diving.

Traditionally, Odawara is known for its production of kamaboko processed fish, stockfish, umeboshi salted plums, and traditional herbal medicines. The Suzuhiro Kamaboko Village is a place to experience making and learning more about Odawara Kamaboko.

The Odawara Hōjō Godai Festival, the city's biggest tourism event, takes place every May 3 during Golden Week.

== Sister cities ==
- (Japan) Nikkō, Tochigi, since December 19, 1980
- (Japan) Kishiwada, Osaka, since June 26, 1968
- Chula Vista, California, United States, since November 8, 1981
- Manly, New South Wales, Australia (friendship city), since 1991
- Shenzhen, Guangdong, China, since February 4, 1993

== Notable people from Odawara ==
- Kai Atō, actor
- Akira Hagiwara, racing driver
- Yōhei Kōno, politician
- Rumina Sato, mixed martial arts fighter
- Ninomiya Sontoku, Edo period economist and philosopher
- Shogo Suzuki, actor and musician (Samurai Sentai Shinkenger)
- Kitamura Tokoku, author
- Yoshiyuki Tomino, anime movie director (Gundam)
- Baku Yumemakura, science fiction author
