= Japan National Route 135 =

Road in Japan

National Route 135
- 国道135号
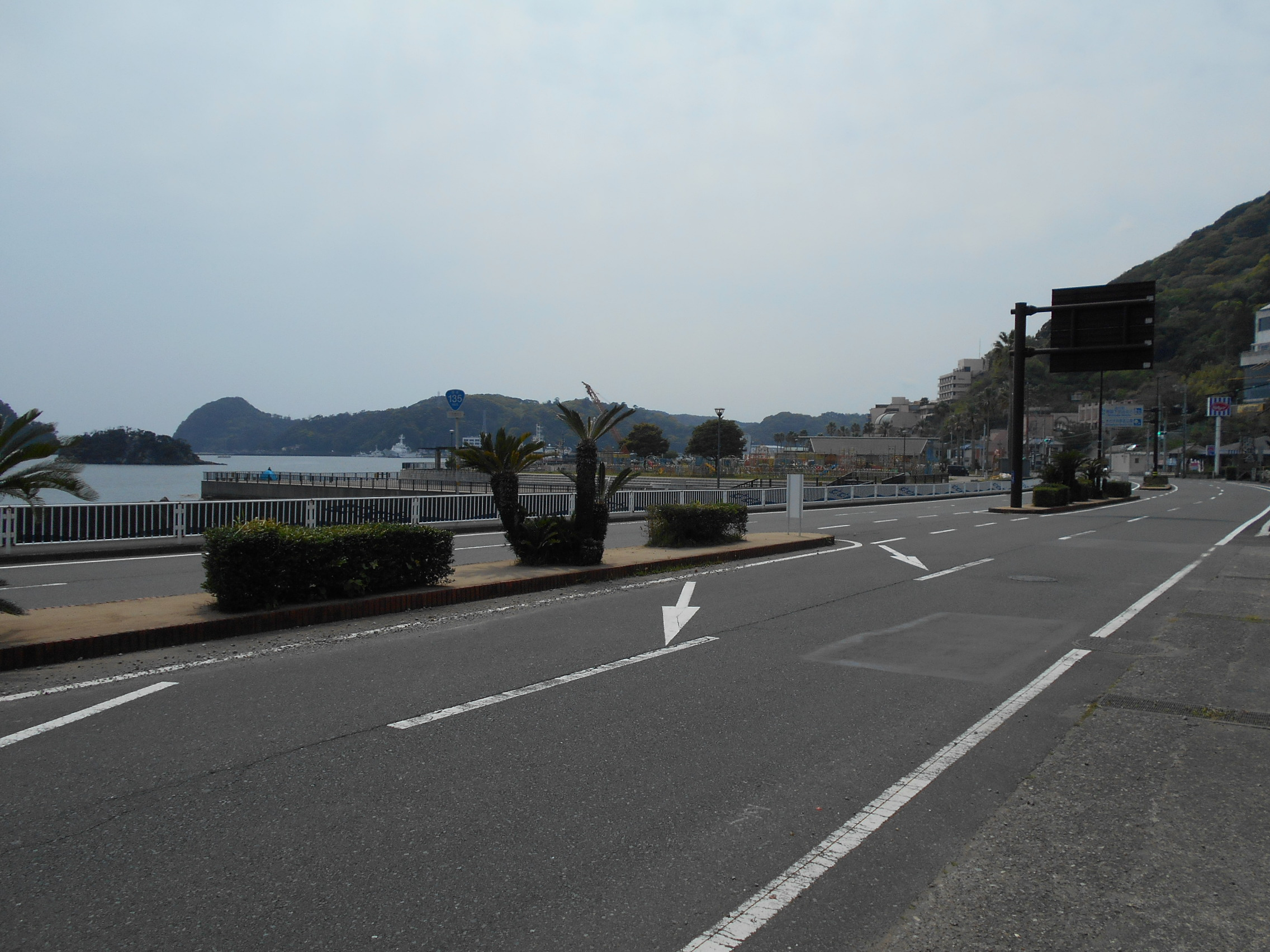

Route information
- Length: 94.4 km (58.7 mi)
- Existed: 1953–present

Major junctions
- South end: National Route 136 / National Route 414 in Shimoda, Shizuoka
- North end: National Route 1 / Prefectural Route 73 in Odawara

Location
- Country: Japan

Highway system
- National highways of Japan; Expressways of Japan
← National Route 134	→ National Route 136

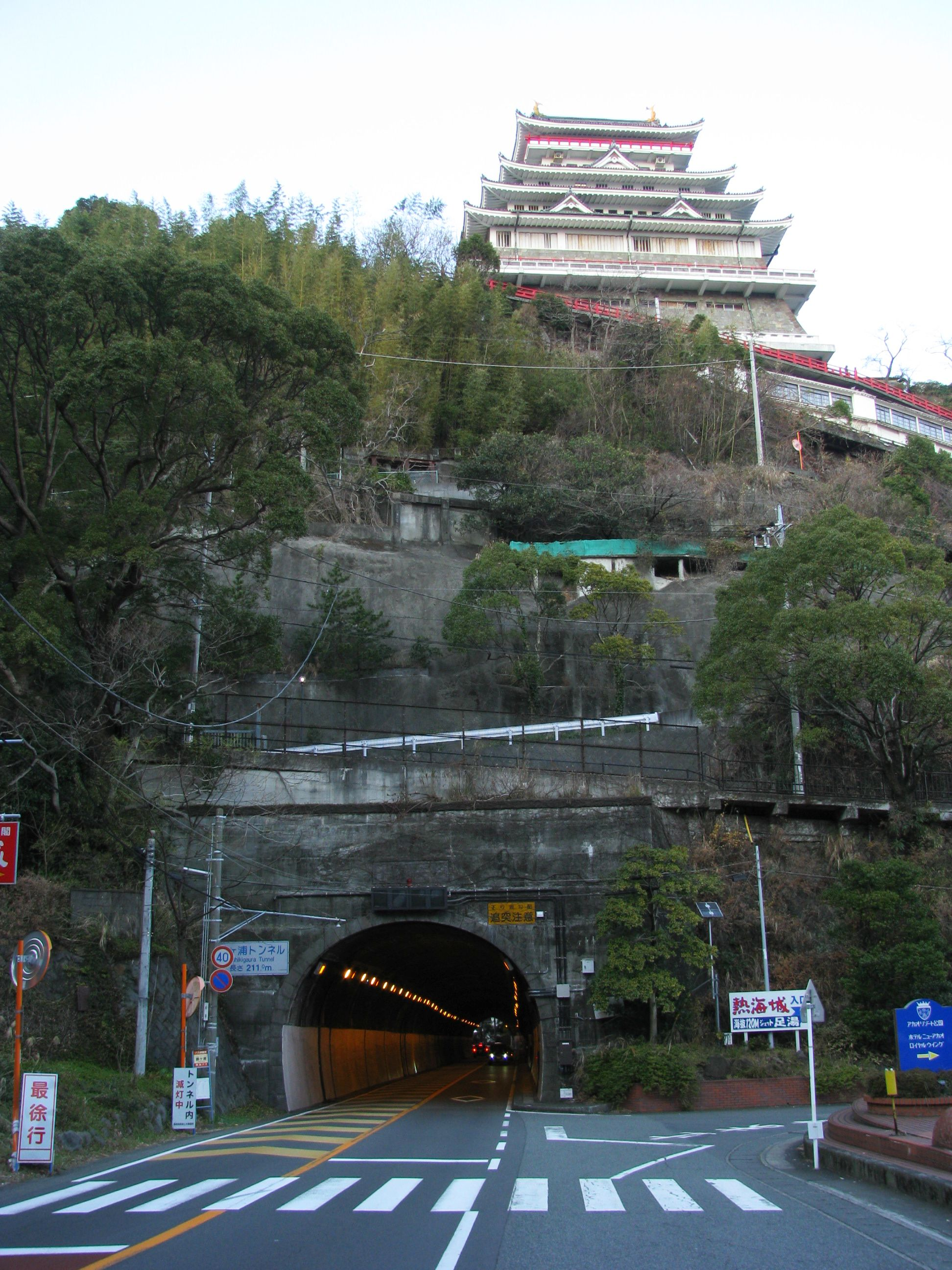
Japan National Route 135 and Atami-jyō

National Route 135 is a national highway of Japan connecting Shimoda and Odawara in Japan, with a total length of 94.4 km (58.66 mi).
