= Gohyakurakan Station =

Railway station in Odawara, Kanagawa Prefecture, Japan

Gohyakurakan Station 五百羅漢駅
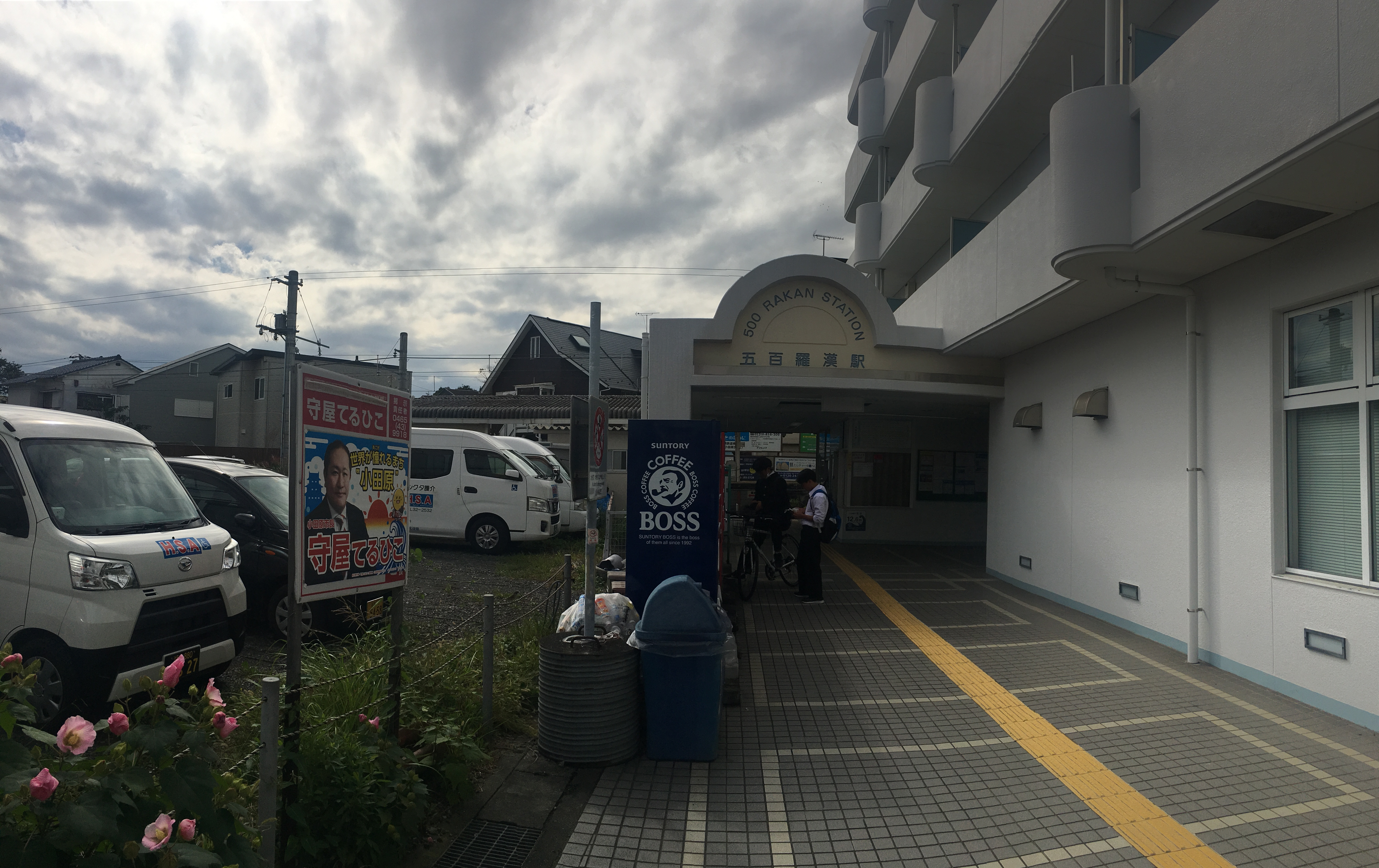
- Gohyakurakan Station, October 2022

General information
- Location: 5-11-12 Ōgichō, Odawara-shi, Kanagawa-ken 250-0001; Japan
- Coordinates: 35°16′30.75″N 139°9′20.69″E
- Operator: Izuhakone Railway
- Line: Daiyūzan Line
- Distance: 2.3 km from Odawara.
- Platforms: 1 island platform
- Connections: Bus stop

Other information
- Station code: ID04
- Website: Official website

History
- Opened: November 24, 1923

Passengers
- FY2019: 713 daily boarding passengers
Location
- Location within Kanagawa Prefecture Location within Japan

Gohyakurakan Station (五百羅漢駅, Gohyakurakan -eki) is a passenger railway station located in the city of Odawara, Kanagawa Prefecture, Japan, operated by the Izuhakone Railway.

== Lines ==
Gohyakurakan Station is served by the Daiyūzan Line, and is located 2.3 kilometers from the line’s terminus at Odawara Station.

== Station layout ==
The station consists of a single island platform connected to a four-story concrete station building. The upper three stories of the station building are apartments. The station has a staffed service window.

=== Platforms ===
1	■ Daiyūzan Line	for Daiyūzan
2	■ Daiyūzan Line	for Odawara

== Adjacent stations ==
←	Service	→
Isaida	Daiyūzan Line	Anabe

== History ==
Gohyakurakan Station was opened on November 24, 1923, with the official opening of the Izuhakone Railway's Daiyūzan Line. The current station building was erected in August 1989.

== Passenger statistics ==
In fiscal 2019, the station was used by an average of 713 passengers daily (boarding passengers only).

The passenger figures (boarding passengers only) for previous years are as shown below.

Fiscal year	daily average
2005	778
2010	742
2015	739

== Surrounding area ==
- Gyokuho-ji Temple with the 500 Rakan statues
- Tako Castle ruins
- Ashigara Station on the Odakyū Odawara Line.

== See also ==
- List of railway stations in Japan
