= Fujifilm-Mae Station =

Railway station in Minamiashigara, Kanagawa Prefecture, Japan

Fujifilm-Mae Station 富士フイルム前駅
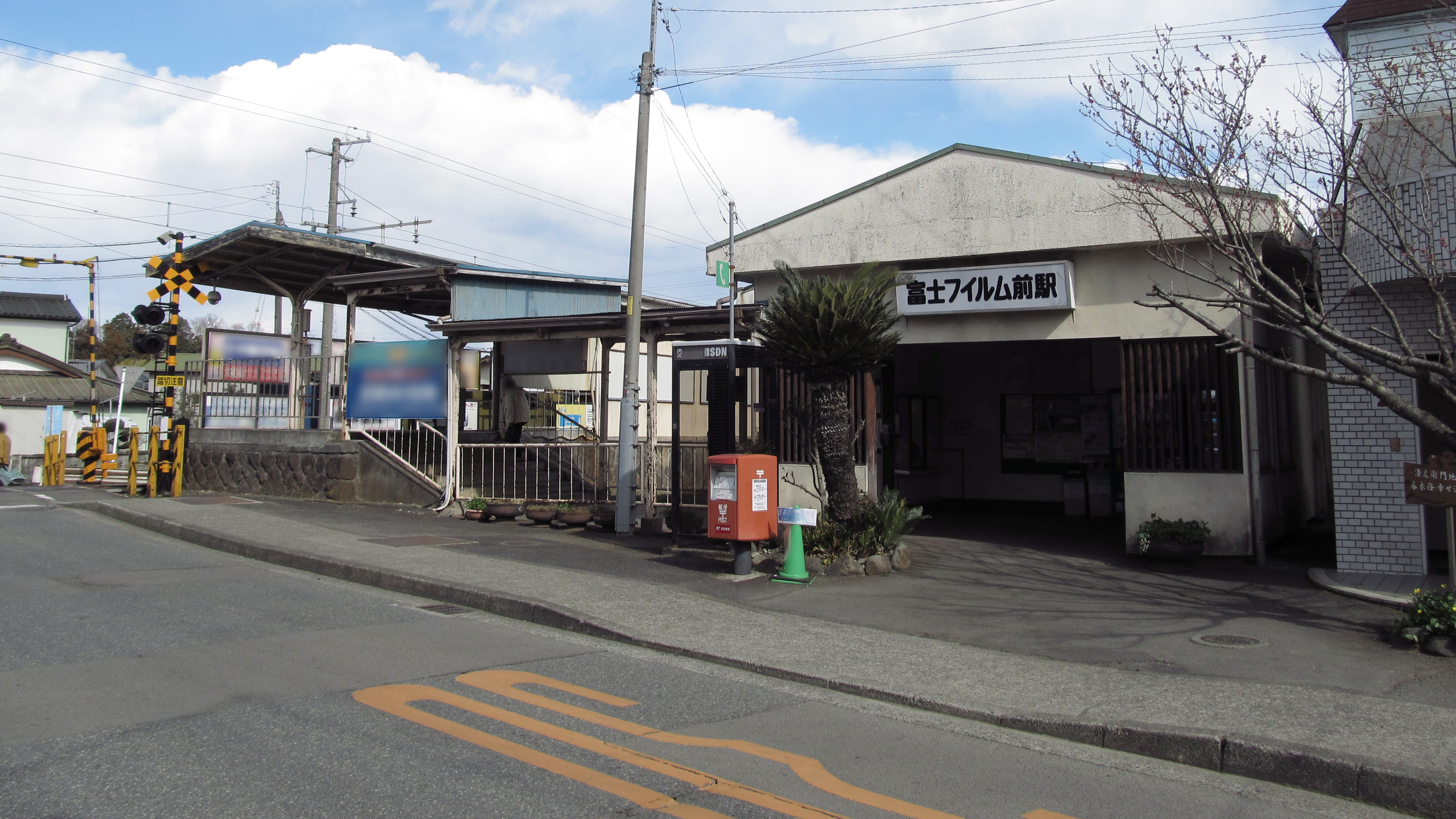
- Fujifilm-Mae Station, March 2014

General information
- Location: 60-1 Kano, Minamiashigara-shi, Kanagawa-ken 250-0126; Japan
- Coordinates: 35°19′3.6″N 139°6′32.0″E
- Operator: Izuhakone Railway
- Line: Daiyūzan Line
- Distance: 9.1 km from Odawara.
- Platforms: 1 side platform
- Connections: Bus stop

Other information
- Station code: ID11
- Website: Official website

History
- Opened: August 13, 1956

Passengers
- FY2019: 663 daily boarding passengers
Location
- Location within Kanagawa Prefecture Location within Japan

Fujifilm-Mae Station (富士フイルム前駅, Fujifuirumu-mae-eki) is a passenger railway station located in the city of Minamiashigara, Kanagawa Prefecture, Japan, operated by the Izuhakone Railway.

== Lines ==
Fujifilm-Mae Station is served by the Daiyūzan Line, and is located 9.1 kilometers from the line’s terminus at Odawara Station.

== Station layout ==
The station consists of a single side platform connected to a small one-story station building, which is staffed only during peak commuting hours.

== Adjacent stations ==
←	Service	→
Wadagahara	Daiyūzan Line	Daiyūzan

== History ==
Fujifilm-Mae Station was opened on August 13, 1956. As the name implies, it is located near the entrance to a large factory complex owned by the Fujifilm company.

== Passenger statistics ==
In fiscal 2019, the station was used by an average of 663 passengers daily (boarding passengers only).

The passenger figures (boarding passengers only) for previous years are as shown below.

Fiscal year	daily average
2005	855
2010	656
2015	641

== Surrounding area ==
The Kaizawa River, which is a tributary of the Kari River, flows in front of the station.

== See also ==
- List of railway stations in Japan
