= Isaida Station =

Railway station in Odawara, Kanagawa Prefecture, Japan

Isaida Station 井細田駅
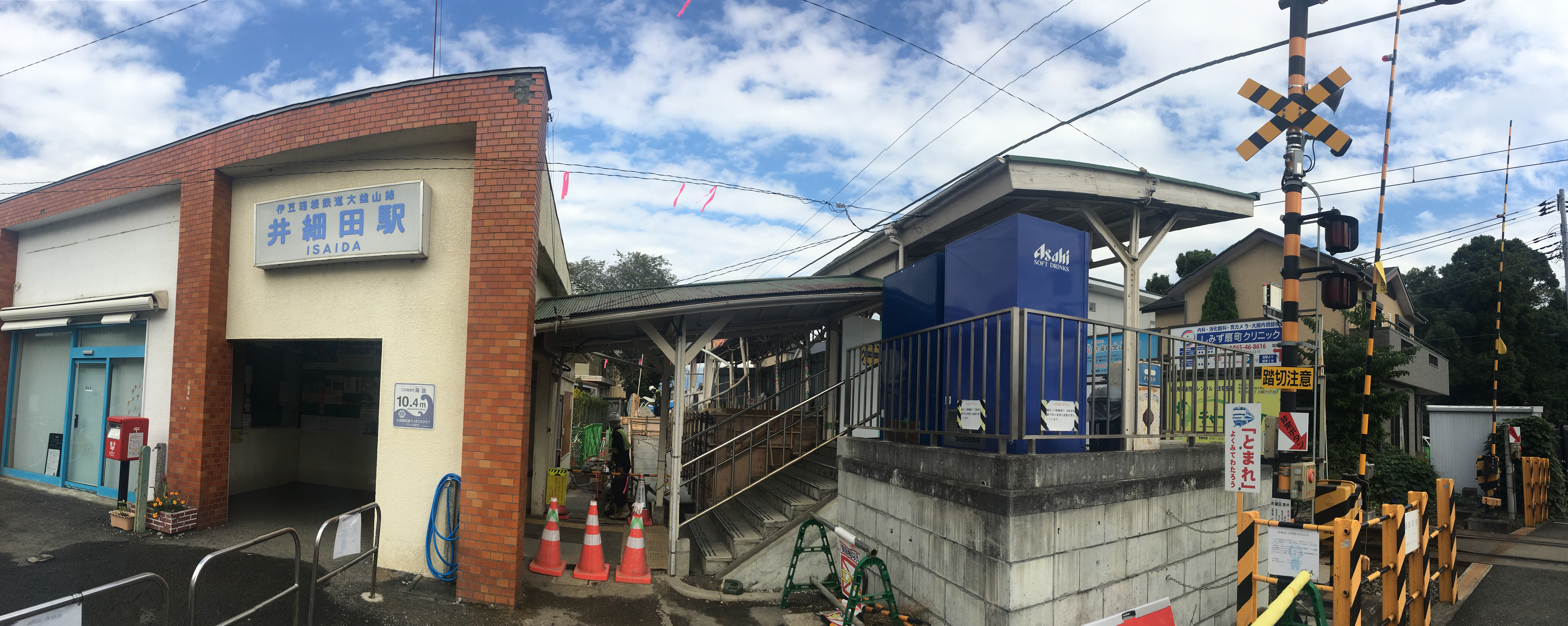
- Isaida Station (left) and platform (right), October 2022

General information
- Location: 3-21-1 Ōgichō, Odawara-shi, Kanagawa-ken 250-0001; Japan
- Coordinates: 35°16′7.22″N 139°9′26.54″E
- Operator: Izuhakone Railway
- Line: Daiyūzan Line
- Distance: 1.4 km from Odawara.
- Platforms: 1 side platform
- Connections: Bus stop

Other information
- Station code: ID03
- Website: Official website

History
- Opened: November 24, 1923

Passengers
- FY2019: 1745 daily boarding passengers
Location
- Location within Kanagawa Prefecture Location within Japan

Isaida Station (井細田駅, Isaida-eki) is a passenger railway station located in the city of Odawara, Kanagawa Prefecture, Japan, operated by the Izuhakone Railway.

== Lines ==
Isaida Station is served by the Daiyūzan Line, and is located 1.4 kilometers from the line’s terminus at Odawara Station.

== Station layout ==
The station consists of a single side platform connected by stairs to a concrete one-story station building. The station building served as an office for the real estate company owned by the Izuhakone Railway until it was closed in 2006. The station is now unstaffed.

== Adjacent stations ==
| ← | Service | → |
|---|---|---|
| Midorichō | Daiyūzan Line | Gohyakurakan |

== History ==
Isaida Station was opened on November 24, 1923, with the official opening of the Izuhakone Railway's Daiyūzan Line.

== Passenger statistics ==
In fiscal 2019, the station was used by an average of 1,745 passengers daily (boarding passengers only).

The passenger figures (boarding passengers only) for previous years are as shown below.

| Fiscal year | daily average |
|---|---|
| 2005 | 1,434 |
| 2010 | 1,268 |
| 2015 | 1,645 |

== Surrounding area ==
- Ashigara Station
- Fujifilm Kanagawa Factory Odawara Site
- Ogicho Post Office
- Odawara College of Nursing

== See also ==
- List of railway stations in Japan
