= Sagami-Numata Station =

Railway station in Minamiashigara, Kanagawa Prefecture, Japan

Sagami-Numata Station 相模沼田駅
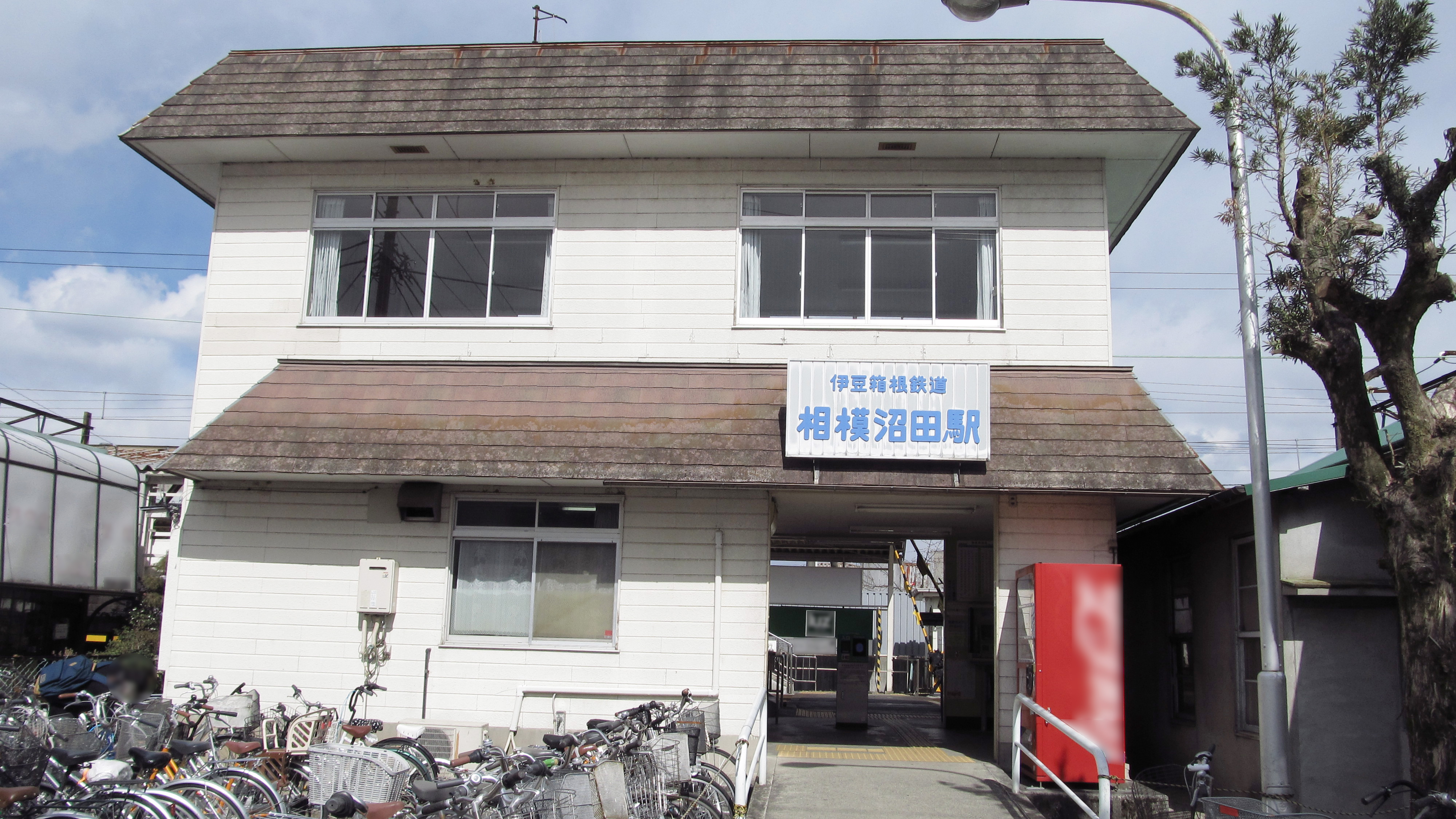
- Sagami-Numata Station, March 2014

General information
- Location: 59-1 Numata, Minamiashigara-shi, Kanagawa-ken 250-0115; Japan
- Coordinates: 35°17′31.56″N 139°8′2.37″E
- Operator: Izuhakone Railway
- Line: Daiyūzan Line
- Distance: 5.0 km from Odawara.
- Platforms: 2 side platforms
- Connections: Bus stop

Other information
- Station code: ID07
- Website: Official website

History
- Opened: October 15, 1925

Passengers
- FY2019: 1,445 daily boarding passengers
Location
- Location within Kanagawa Prefecture Location within Japan

Sagami-Numata Station (相模沼田駅, Sagami-Numata-eki) is a passenger railway station located in the city of Minamiashigara, Kanagawa Prefecture, Japan, operated by the Izuhakone Railway.

== Lines ==
Sagami-Numata Station is served by the Daiyūzan Line, and is located 5.0 kilometers from the line’s terminus at Odawara Station.

== Station layout ==
The station consists of two opposing side platforms connected to a two-story station building by a footbridge.

=== Platforms ===
1	■ Daiyūzan Line	for Daiyūzan
2	■ Daiyūzan Line	for Odawara

== Adjacent stations ==
←	Service	→
Iidaoka	Daiyūzan Line	Iwahara

== History ==
Sagami-Numata Station was officially opened on October 15, 1925. The current station building was completed in February 1981.

== Passenger statistics ==
In fiscal 2019, the station was used by an average of 1,445 passengers daily (boarding passengers only).

The passenger figures (boarding passengers only) for previous years are as shown below.

Fiscal year	daily average
2005	1,523
2010	1,485
2015	1,500

== Surrounding area ==
The city border between Odawara and Minamiashigara is at the station, but the station building is located in within Minamiashigara. Prefectural Road 74 runs on the west side of the station, and the Karikawa River on the east side. The station is in a residential area.

== See also ==
- List of railway stations in Japan
