= Iidaoka Station =

Railway station in Odawara, Kanagawa Prefecture, Japan

Iidaoka Station 飯田岡駅
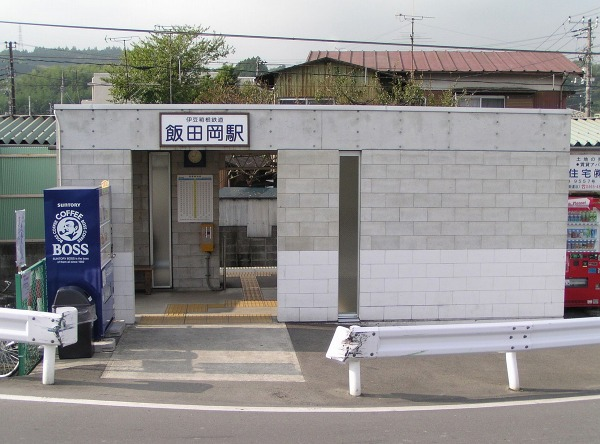
- Iidaoka Station, November 2006

General information
- Location: 545 Iidaoka, Odawara-shi, Kanagawa-ken 250-0854; Japan
- Coordinates: 35°17′16.97″N 139°8′20.85″E
- Operator: Izuhakone Railway
- Line: Daiyūzan Line
- Distance: 4.3 km from Odawara.
- Platforms: 1 side platform
- Connections: Bus stop

Other information
- Station code: ID06
- Website: Official website

History
- Opened: May 19, 1926

Passengers
- FY2019: 900 daily boarding passengers
Location
- Location within Kanagawa Prefecture Location within Japan

Iidaoka Station (飯田岡駅, Iidaoka-eki) is a passenger railway station located in the city of Odawara, Kanagawa Prefecture, Japan, operated by the Izuhakone Railway.

== Lines ==
Iidaoka Station is served by the Daiyūzan Line, and is located 4.3 kilometers from the line’s terminus at Odawara Station.

== Station layout ==
The station consists of a single side platform with a rain shelter built on the platform as well as a shed housing the machinery for automatic ticket machines. The station is unstaffed.

== Adjacent stations ==
←	Service	→
Anabe	Daiyūzan Line	Sagami-Numata

== History ==
Iidaoka Station was officially opened on May 19, 1926 in a ceremony attended by the Railway Minister; however, it appears to have been in operation from the opening of the line on October 15, 1925.

== Passenger statistics ==
In fiscal 2019, the station was used by an average of 900 passengers daily (boarding passengers only).

The passenger figures (boarding passengers only) for previous years are as shown below.

Fiscal year	daily average
2005	902
2010	897
2015	896

== Surrounding area ==
- Karikawa River
- Tomimizu Elementary School
- Izumi Junior High School
- Iidaoka Post Office

== See also ==
- List of railway stations in Japan
