= Iwahara =

Iwahara (written: 岩原) is a Japanese surname. Notable people with the surname include:

- Tomomi Iwahara (岩原 知美, born 1987), Japanese ice hockey player
- Toyoko Iwahara (岩原 豊子, born 1945), Japanese volleyball player
- Yūji Iwahara (岩原 裕二), Japanese manga artist

== See also ==
- Mount Iwahara, a mountain of Hyōgo Prefecture, Japan
- Iwahara Station, a railway station in Minamiashigara, Kanagawa Prefecture, Japan
