= Tsukahara Station =

Railway station in Minamiashigara, Kanagawa Prefecture, Japan

Tsukahara Station 塚原駅
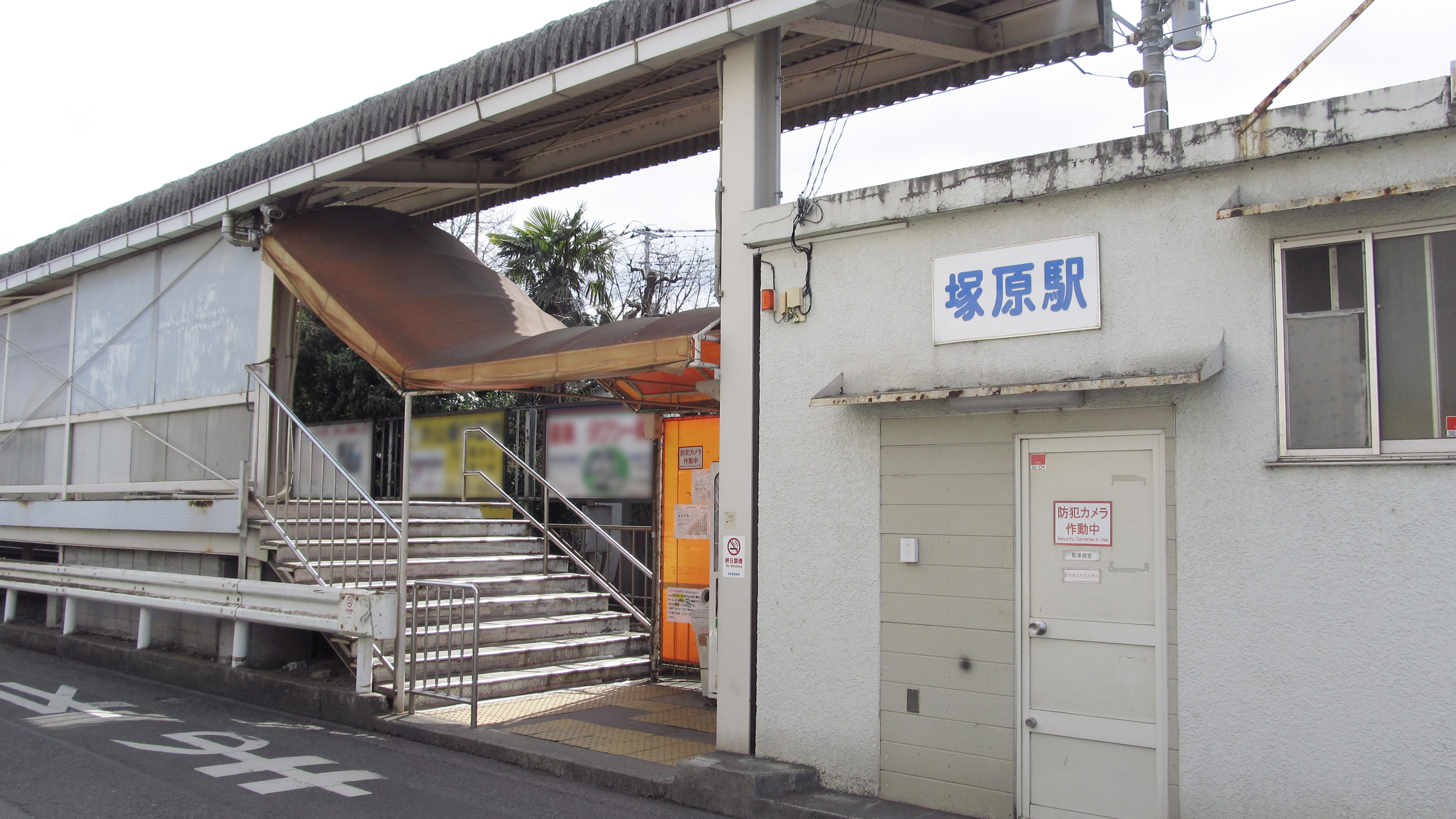
- Tsukahara Station in March 2014

General information
- Location: 2680-1 Tsukahara, Minamiashigara-shi, Kanagawa-ken 250-0117; Japan
- Coordinates: 35°18′05.39″N 139°7′35.45″E
- Operator: Izuhakone Railway
- Line: Daiyūzan Line
- Distance: 6.3 km from Odawara.
- Platforms: 1 side platform
- Connections: Bus stop

Other information
- Station code: ID09
- Website: Official website

History
- Opened: October 15, 1925

Passengers
- FY2019: 1,126 daily boarding passengers
Location
- Location within Kanagawa Prefecture Location within Japan

Tsukahara Station (塚原駅, Tsukahara-eki) is a passenger railway station located in the city of Minamiashigara, Kanagawa Prefecture, Japan, operated by the Izuhakone Railway.

== Lines ==
Tsukahara Station is served by the Daiyūzan Line, and is located 6.3 kilometers from the line’s terminus at Odawara Station.

== Station layout ==
The station consists of a single side platform with a small attached station building. The station is unstaffed.

== Adjacent stations ==
←	Service	→
Iwahara	Daiyūzan Line	Wadagahara

== History ==
Tsukahara Station was officially opened on October 15, 1925.

== Passenger statistics ==
In fiscal 2019, the station was used by an average of 1,126 passengers daily (boarding passengers only).

The passenger figures (boarding passengers only) for previous years are as shown below.

Fiscal year	daily average
2005	1,267
2010	1,226
2015	1,192

== Surrounding area ==
Prefectural Road 74 runs on the west side of the station, and the Karikawa River on the east side. On the opposite bank of Karikawa, there are Minamiashigara City Okamoto Junior High School, Minamiashigara City Okamoto Elementary School, Minamiashigara City Hall Okamoto Branch, and Minamiashigara City Library, which are connected to the station side by a prefectural road bridge. In addition, the Tsukahara Post Office is located near the station.

== See also ==
- List of railway stations in Japan
