= Wadagahara Station =

Railway station in Minamiashigara, Kanagawa Prefecture, Japan

Wadagahara Station 和田河原駅
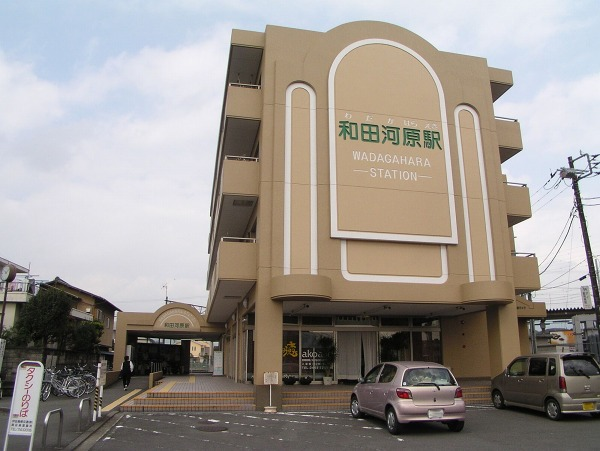
- Wadagahara Station in 2006

General information
- Location: 584 Wadagahara, Minamiashigara-shi, Kanagawa-ken 250-0112; Japan
- Coordinates: 35°18′57.09″N 139°7′07.17″E
- Operator: Izuhakone Railway
- Line: Daiyūzan Line
- Distance: 8.2 km from Odawara.
- Platforms: 1 island platform
- Connections: Bus stop

Other information
- Station code: ID10
- Website: Official website

History
- Opened: October 15, 1925

Passengers
- FY2019: 1,552 daily boarding passengers
Location
- Location within Kanagawa Prefecture Location within Japan

Wadagahara Station (和田河原駅, Wadagahara-eki) is a passenger railway station located in the city of Minamiashigara, Kanagawa Prefecture, Japan, operated by the Izuhakone Railway.

== Lines ==
Wadagahara Station is served by the Daiyūzan Line, and is located 8.2 kilometers from the line’s terminus at Odawara Station.

== Station layout ==
The station consists of a single island platform connected to a concrete four-story station building. The upper three stories of the station building are apartments. The station has a staffed service window.

=== Platforms ===
1	■ Daiyūzan Line	for Daiyūzan
2	■ Daiyūzan Line	for Odawara

== Adjacent stations ==
←	Service	→
Tsukahara	Daiyūzan Line	Fujifilm-Mae

== History ==
Wadagahara Station was officially opened on October 15, 1925. The new station building was completed in March 1992.

== Passenger statistics ==
In fiscal 2019, the station was used by an average of 1,552 passengers daily (boarding passengers only).

The passenger figures (boarding passengers only) for previous years are as shown below.

Fiscal year	daily average
2005	1,970
2010	1,643
2015	1,612

== Bus services ==
- Hakone Tozan Bus
  - for Odakyu Kaisei Station
  - for Sekimoto (Daiyuzan Station)

== Surrounding area ==
The station has a square with a bus terminal. Public facilities are close to the Wadagahara Station Square Post Office and the Minamiashigara City Sports Center. Many factories of Fujifilm and related companies are located to the southwest and northeast of the station, which is closer to the main gate than the adjacent Fujifilm-mae station.

== See also ==
- List of railway stations in Japan
