= Anabe Station =

Railway station in Odawara, Kanagawa Prefecture, Japan

Anabe Station 穴部駅
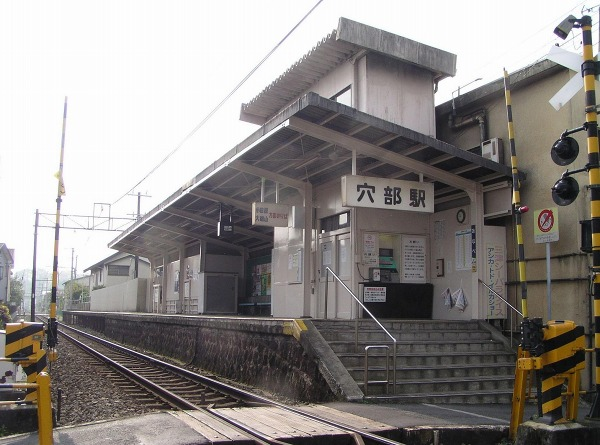
- Anabe Station, October 2006

General information
- Location: 563 Anabe, Odawara-shi, Kanagawa-ken 250-0053; Japan
- Coordinates: 35°16′48.2″N 139°8′54.8″E
- Operator: Izuhakone Railway
- Line: Daiyūzan Line
- Distance: 3.1 km from Odawara.
- Platforms: 1 side platform
- Connections: Bus stop

Other information
- Station code: ID05
- Website: Official website

History
- Opened: October 15, 1925

Passengers
- FY2019: 684 daily boarding passengers
Location
- Location within Kanagawa Prefecture Location within Japan

Anabe Station (穴部駅, Anabe-eki) is a passenger railway station located in the city of Odawara, Kanagawa Prefecture, Japan, operated by the Izuhakone Railway.

== Lines ==
Anabe Station is served by the Daiyūzan Line, and is located 3.1 kilometers from the line’s terminus at Odawara Station.

== Station layout ==
The station consists of a single side platform with a rain shelter built on the platform and a shed housing the machinery for automatic ticket machines. The station is unstaffed.

== Adjacent stations ==
←	Service	→
Gohyakurakan	Daiyūzan Line	Iidaoka

== History ==
Anabe Station was opened on October 15, 1925.

== Passenger statistics ==
In fiscal 2019, the station was used by an average of 684 passengers daily (boarding passengers only).

The passenger figures (boarding passengers only) for previous years are as shown below.

Fiscal year	daily average
2005	757
2010	679
2015	684

== Surrounding area ==
Prefectural Road 74 runs on the south side of the station, and the Karikawa River flows on the north side.

== See also ==
- List of railway stations in Japan
