= Kamonomiya Station =

Kamonomiya Station is the name of multiple train stations in Japan.

- Kamonomiya Station (Kanagawa) (鴨宮駅) - in Kanagawa Prefecture
- Kamonomiya Station (Saitama) (加茂宮駅) - in Saitama Prefecture
