= Minamiashigara =

Minamiashigara 南足柄市
- City
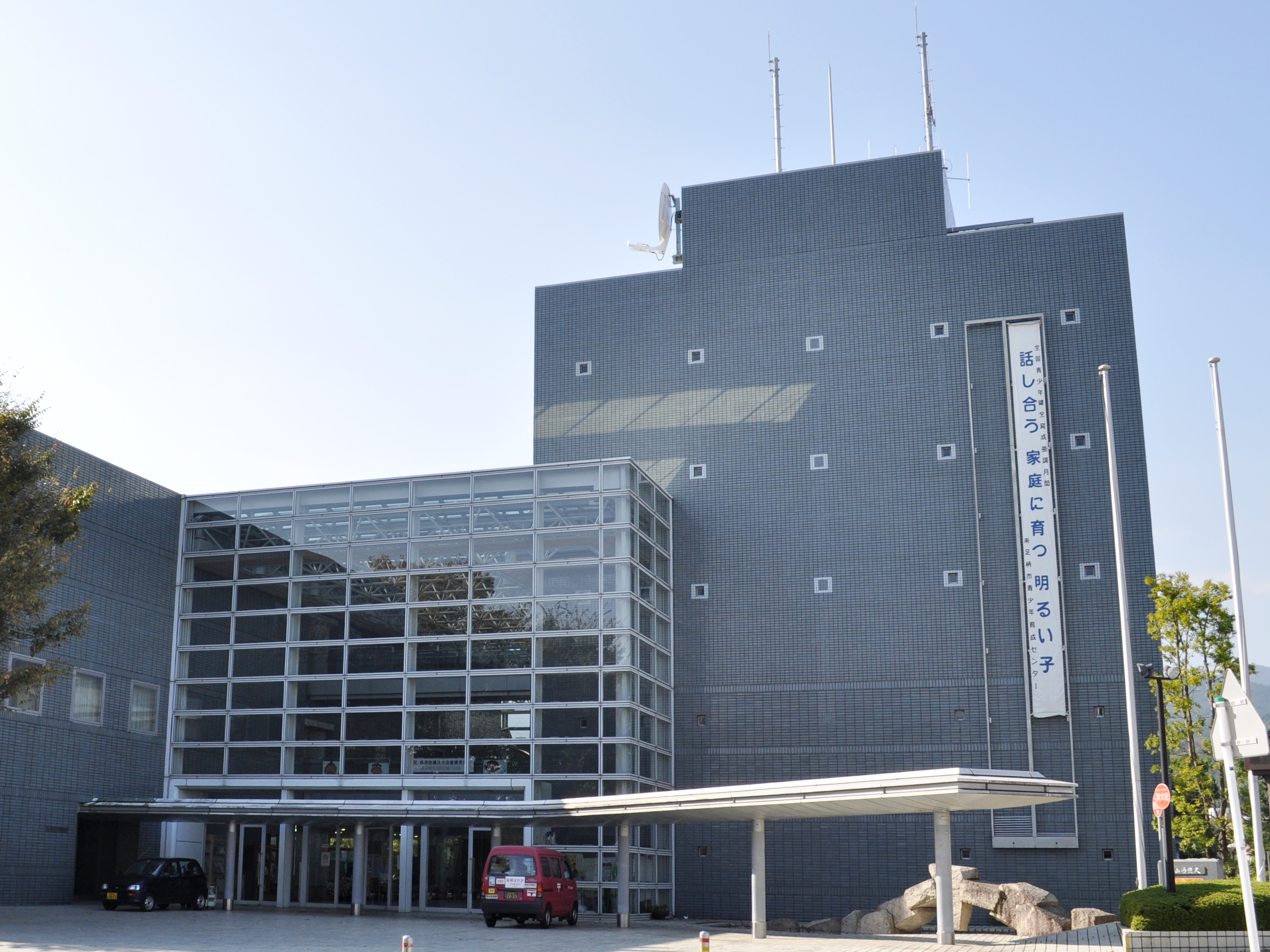
- Minamiashigara City Hall

- Flag Emblem

- Location of Minamiashigara in Kanagawa Prefecture

- Coordinates: 35°19′N 139°06′E
- Country: Japan
- Region: Kantō
- Prefecture: Kanagawa

Area
  - Total: 77.12 km^{2} (29.78 sq mi)

Population (May 1, 2021)
  - Total: 40,947
  - Density: 531.0/km^{2} (1,375/sq mi)
- Time zone: UTC+9 (Japan Standard Time)
- Tree: Camellia sasanqua
- Flower: Japanese gentian
- Address: Sekimoto 440-banchi, Minamiashigara-shi, Kanagawa-ken 250-0192
- Website: Official website

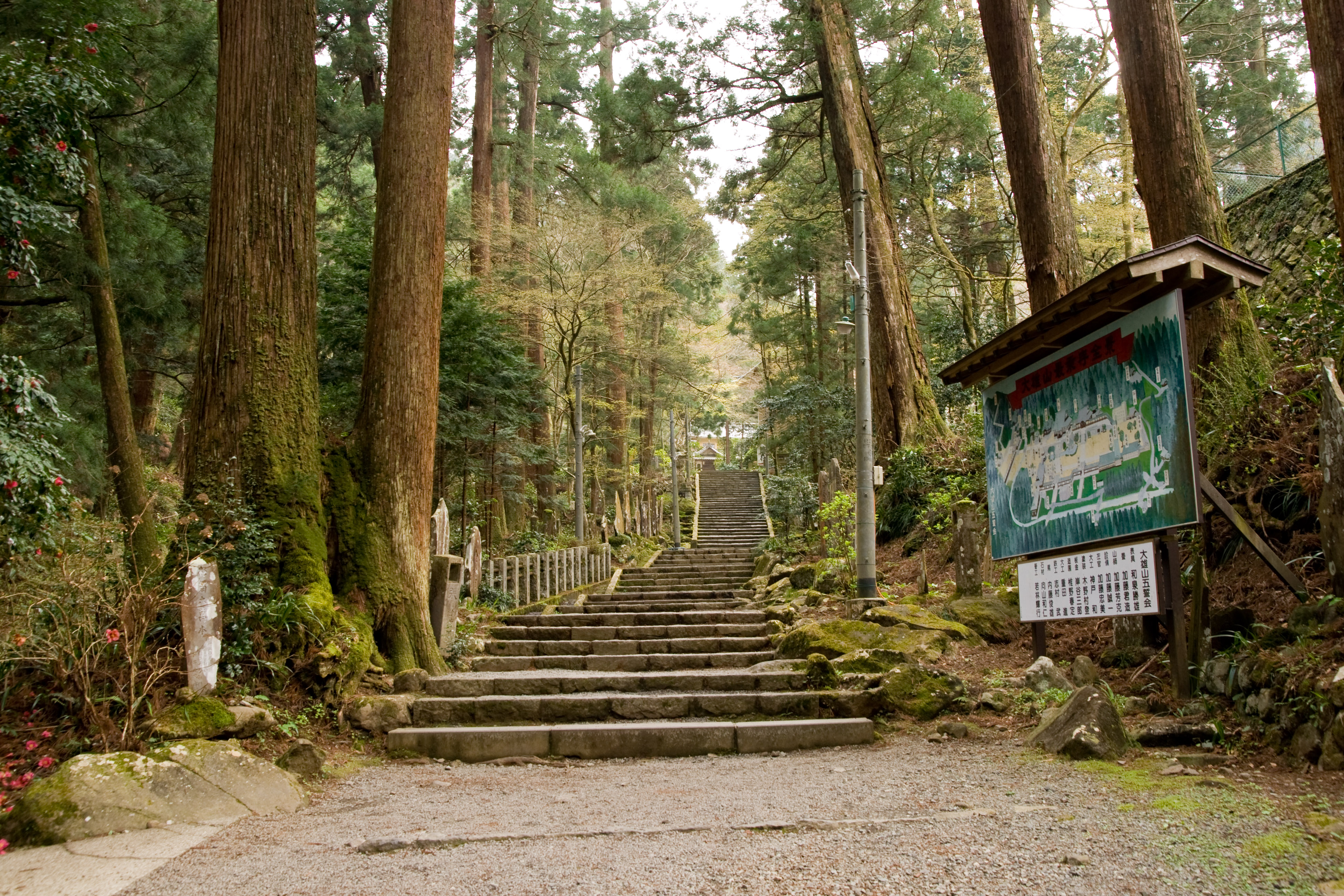
Daiyuzan Saijoji Temple

Minamiashigara (南足柄市, Minamiashigara-shi) is a city located in Kanagawa Prefecture, Japan. As of 1 May 2021, the city had an estimated population of 40,947 and a population density of 530 persons per km^{2}. The total area of the city is 77.12 square kilometres (29.78 sq mi).

== Geography ==
Minamiashigara is located in the mountainous west of Kanagawa Prefecture, with most of the city located within either the Tanzawa-Ōyama Quasi-National Park or the Fuji-Hakone-Izu National Park.

=== Surrounding municipalities ===
Kanagawa Prefecture

- Hakone
- Kaeisei
- Odawara
- Yamakita

Shizuoka Prefecture

- Oyama

=== Climate ===
Minamiashigara has a humid subtropical climate (Köppen Cfa) characterized by warm summers and cool winters with light to no snowfall. The average annual temperature in Minamiashigara is 13.6 °C. The average annual rainfall is 2221 mm with September as the wettest month. The temperatures are highest on average in August, at around 24.4 °C, and lowest in January, at around 3.2 °C.

== Demographics ==
Per Japanese census data, the population of Minamiashigara peaked around the year 2000 and is now slowly declining.

Historical population
Year	Pop.	±%
1950	17,581	—
1960	19,663	+11.8%
1970	30,327	+54.2%
1980	39,919	+31.6%
1990	42,600	+6.7%
2000	44,156	+3.7%
2010	44,020	−0.3%
2020	40,841	−7.2%

== History ==
The area that is now known as Minamiashigara was under control of the later Hōjō clan in the Sengoku period, and part of Odawara Domain during the Edo period.

After the Meiji Restoration, the establishment of the modern municipalities system created Minamiashigara, Fukusawa, Okamoto and Kitaashigara villages within Ashigarakami District, Kanagawa Prefecture. The development of the area was spurred by the opening of the Oyama Mountain Railway (present-day Izuhakone Railway Daiyūzan Line) on October 15, 1925. Minamiashigara was elevated in status to that of a town on April 1, 1940, and annexed neighboring Fukusawa, Okamoto and Kitaashigara villages in 1955. It was elevated to city status on April 1, 1972.

== Government ==
Minamiashigara has a mayor-council form of government with a directly elected mayor and a unicameral city council of 16 members. Minamiashigara, collectively with the municipalities of Ashigarakami District, contributes one member to the Kanagawa Prefectural Assembly. In terms of national politics, the city is part of Kanagawa 17th district of the lower house of the Diet of Japan.

== Economy ==
The economy of Minamiashigara is based on forestry and agriculture (primarily green tea and mikan). Fujifilm and Asahi Breweries have factories in Minamiashigara to make use of its abundant fresh water.

== Education ==
Minamiashigara has six public elementary schools and three public middle schools operated by the city government. The city has one public high school operated by the Kanagawa Prefectural Board of Education.

== Transportation ==
=== Railway ===
Izuhakone Railway - Daiyūzan Line

- Sagami-Numata - Iwahara - Tsukahara - Wadagahara - Fujifilm-Mae - Daiyūzan

=== Bus ===
- Hakone Tozan Bus
  - (Shin-Matsuda Station) - Sekimoto (Daiyūzan Station) - Jizodo

=== Highway ===
Minamiashigara is not located on any national highway. Kanagawa Prefectural Route 74 provided the primary connection with neighboring Odawara and Kanagawa Prefectural Route 78 with the Ōi-Matsuda Interchange on the Tōmei Expressway.

== Sister cities ==
- Tilburg, Netherlands, since June 4, 1989

== Local attractions ==
- Ashigara Pass
- Maruta no Mori, a park with hiking trails and camp grounds.
- Niju Isseki no Mori (21st Century Forest), a park with hiking trails
- Saijoji Temple, one of many temples and shrines located in an old growth cedar forest.
- Yuhi no Taki, a waterfall

== Noted people from Minamiashigara ==
- Hinata Miyazawa, football player for the Japan national team
- Rina Uchiyama, actress and idol
