= Iwahara Station =

Railway station in Minamiashigara, Kanagawa Prefecture, Japan

Iwahara Station 岩原駅
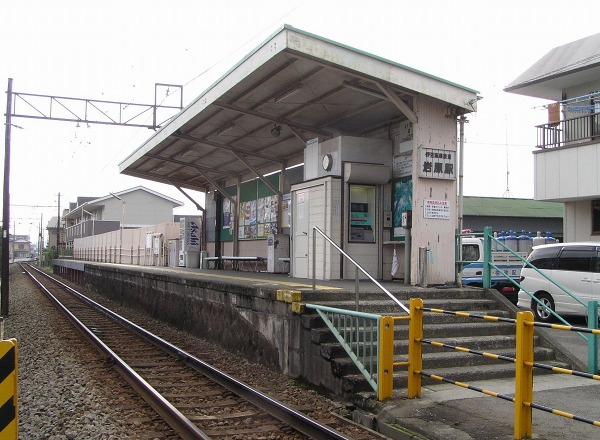
- Iwahara Station

General information
- Location: 270-1 Iwahara, Minamiashigara-shi, Kanagawa-ken 250-0113; Japan
- Coordinates: 35°17′56.20″N 139°7′43.24″E
- Operator: Izuhakone Railway
- Line: Daiyūzan Line
- Distance: 6.0 km from Odawara.
- Platforms: 1 side platform
- Connections: Bus stop

Other information
- Station code: ID08
- Website: Official website

History
- Opened: October 15, 1925

Passengers
- FY2019: 746 daily boarding passengers
Location
- Location within Kanagawa Prefecture Location within Japan

Iwahara Station (岩原駅, Iwahara-eki) is a passenger railway station located in the city of Minamiashigara, Kanagawa Prefecture, Japan, operated by the Izuhakone Railway.

== Lines ==
Iwahara Station is served by the Daiyūzan Line, and is located 6.0 kilometers from the line's terminus at Odawara Station.

== Station layout ==
The station consists of a single side platform with no station building. The station is unstaffed.

== Adjacent stations ==
←	Service	→
Sagami-Numata	Daiyūzan Line	Tsukahara

== History ==
Iwahara Station was officially opened on October 15, 1925.

== Passenger statistics ==
In fiscal 2019, the station was used by an average of 746 passengers daily (boarding passengers only).

The passenger figures (boarding passengers only) for previous years are as shown below.

Fiscal year	daily average
2005	890
2010	836
2015	804

== Surrounding area ==
Prefectural Road 74 runs on the west side of the station, and the Karikawa River on the east side. Minamiashigara City Iwahara Elementary School is about 300 meters south of the station, and Iwahara Castle ruins and Iwahara Hachiman Shrine are relatively close to each other about 1 km southwest of the station.

== See also ==
- List of railway stations in Japan
