= Midorichō Station =

Railway station in Odawara, Kanagawa Prefecture, Japan

Midorichō Station 緑町駅
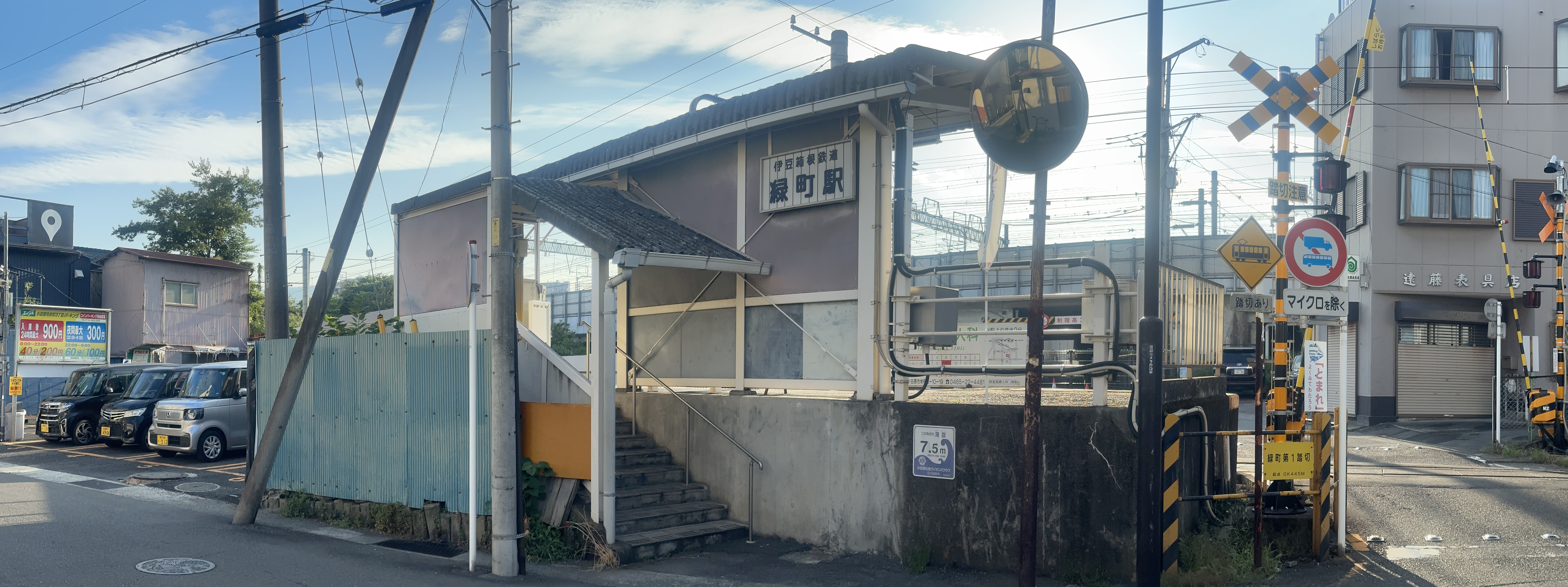
- Midorichō Station, August 2025

General information
- Location: 3-5-21 Sakae-chō, Odawara-shi, Kanagawa-ken 250-0011; Japan
- Coordinates: 35°15′34.63″N 139°9′32.19″E
- Operator: Izuhakone Railway
- Line: Daiyūzan Line
- Distance: 0.4 km from Odawara.
- Platforms: 1 side platform
- Connections

Other information
- Station code: ID02
- Website: Official website

History
- Opened: June 14, 1935

Passengers
- FY2019: 228 daily boarding passengers
Location
- Location within Kanagawa Prefecture Location within Japan

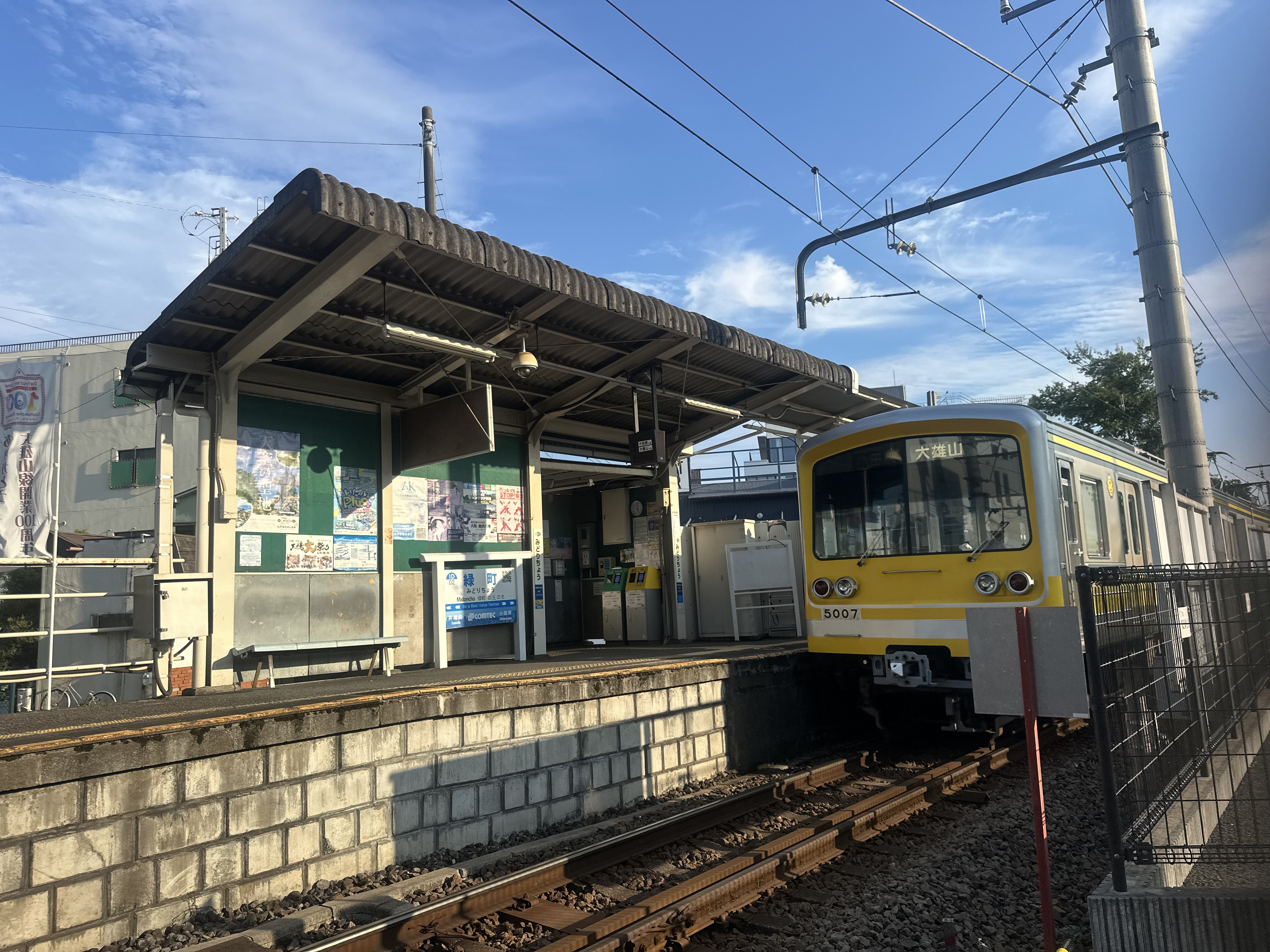
Platforms and a train, 2025

Midorichō Station (緑町駅, Midorichō-eki) is a passenger railway station located in the city of Odawara, Kanagawa Prefecture, Japan, operated by the Izuhakone Railway.

== Lines ==
Midorichō Station is served by the Daiyūzan Line, and is located 0.4 kilometers from the line's terminus at Odawara Station.

== Station layout ==
The station consists of a single side platform with a small rain shelter built on the platform. The station has no station building and is unstaffed.

== Adjacent stations ==
| ← | Service | → |
|---|---|---|
| Odawara | Daiyūzan Line | Isaida |

== History ==
Midorichō Station was opened on June 14, 1935, when the Izuhakone Railway's Daiyūzan Line was extended from Sagami-Hirokoji to Shin-Odawara. Both of the adjacent stations went out of operation two days later; the line was then extended to Odawara Station.

== Passenger statistics ==
In fiscal 2019, the station was used by an average of 228 passengers daily (boarding passengers only).

The passenger figures (boarding passengers only) for previous years are as shown below.

| Fiscal year | daily average |
|---|---|
| 2005 | 207 |
| 2010 | 155 |
| 2015 | 200 |

== Surrounding area ==
The station is located in downtown Odawara, within sight of Odawara Station.

== See also ==
- List of railway stations in Japan
