= Daiyūzan Line =

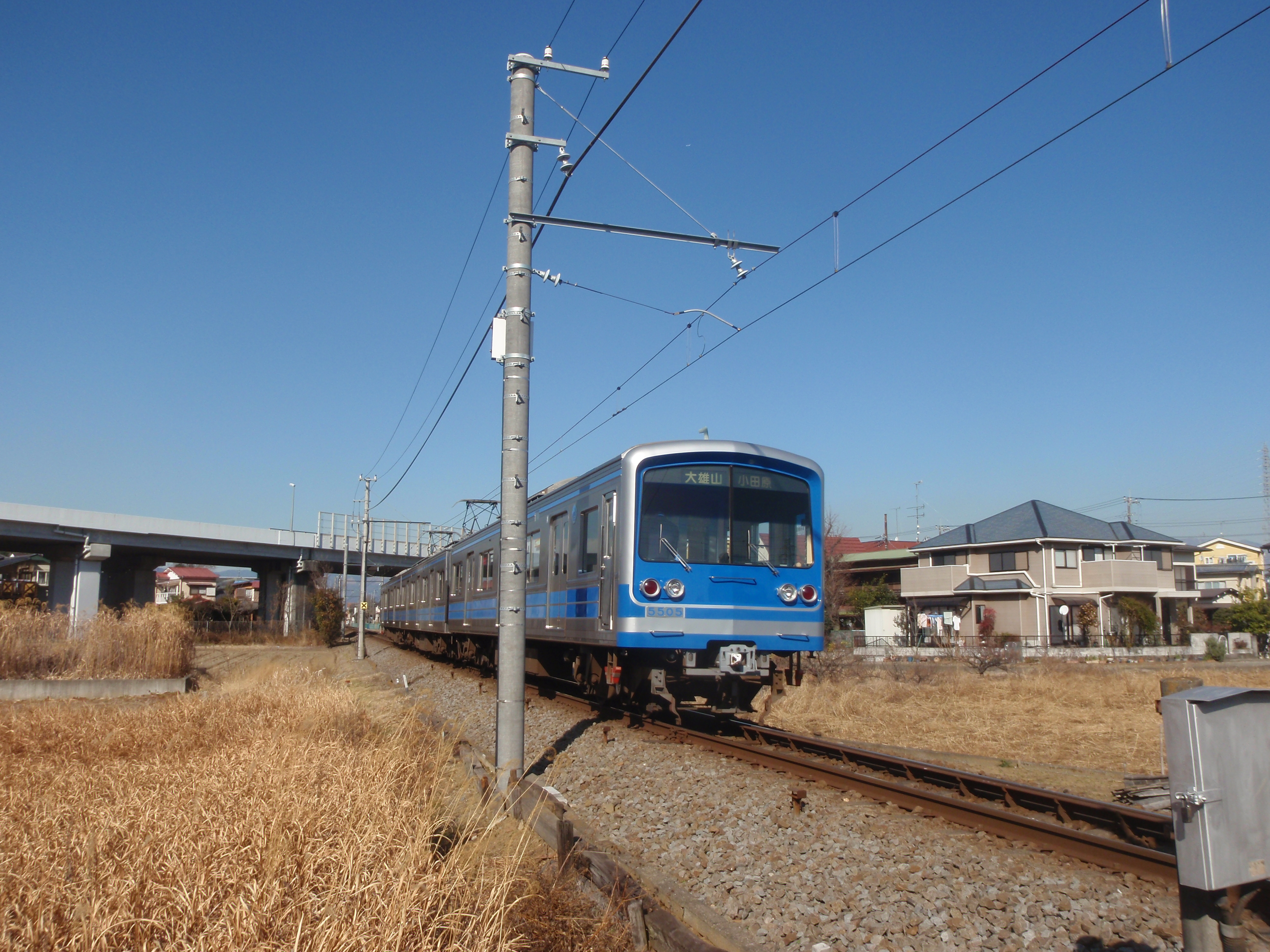
- An Izu Hakone Daiyuzan Line 5000 series EMU in January 2011

Overview
- Native name: 大雄山線
- Status: Operational
- Owner: Izuhakone Railway
- Locale: Kanto region
- Termini: Odawara; Daiyūzan
- Stations: 12

Service
- Type: Commuter rail

History
- Opened: 1925; 101 years ago

Technical
- Line length: 9.6 km (6.0 mi)
- Number of tracks: single
- Track gauge: 1,067 mm (3 ft 6 in)
- Electrification: 1,500 V DC overhead catenary

On an off a train on the Daiyūzan Line, 2025

The Daiyūzan Line (大雄山線, Daiyūzan-sen) is a commuter railway line in Kanagawa Prefecture, Japan, operated by the private railway operator Izuhakone Railway. The line connects Odawara Station in the city of Odawara with the Daiyūzan Station in the city of Minamiashigara.

== Stations ==
No.	Station	Japanese	Distance (km)	Distance (km from Odawara)	Transfers	Location
ID01	Odawara	小田原	-	0.0	Tokaido Main Line; Tokaido Shinkansen; Odakyu Odawara Line; Hakone Tozan Line	Odawara, Kanagawa
ID02	Midorichō	緑町	0.4	0.4		Odawara, Kanagawa
ID03	Isaida	井細田	1.0	1.4		Odawara, Kanagawa
ID04	Gohyakurakan	五百羅漢	0.9	2.3		Odawara, Kanagawa
ID05	Anabe	穴部	0.8	3.1		Odawara, Kanagawa
ID06	Iidaoka	飯田岡	1.2	4.3		Odawara, Kanagawa
ID07	Sagami-Numata	相模沼田	0.7	5.0		Minamiashigara, Kanagawa
ID08	Iwahara	岩原	1.0	6.0		Minamiashigara, Kanagawa
ID09	Tsukahara	塚原	0.3	6.3		Minamiashigara, Kanagawa
ID10	Wadagahara	和田河原	1.9	8.2		Minamiashigara, Kanagawa
ID11	Fujifilm-Mae	富士フイルム前	0.9	9.1		Minamiashigara, Kanagawa
ID12	Daiyūzan	大雄山	0.5	9.6		Minamiashigara, Kanagawa

== Rolling stock ==
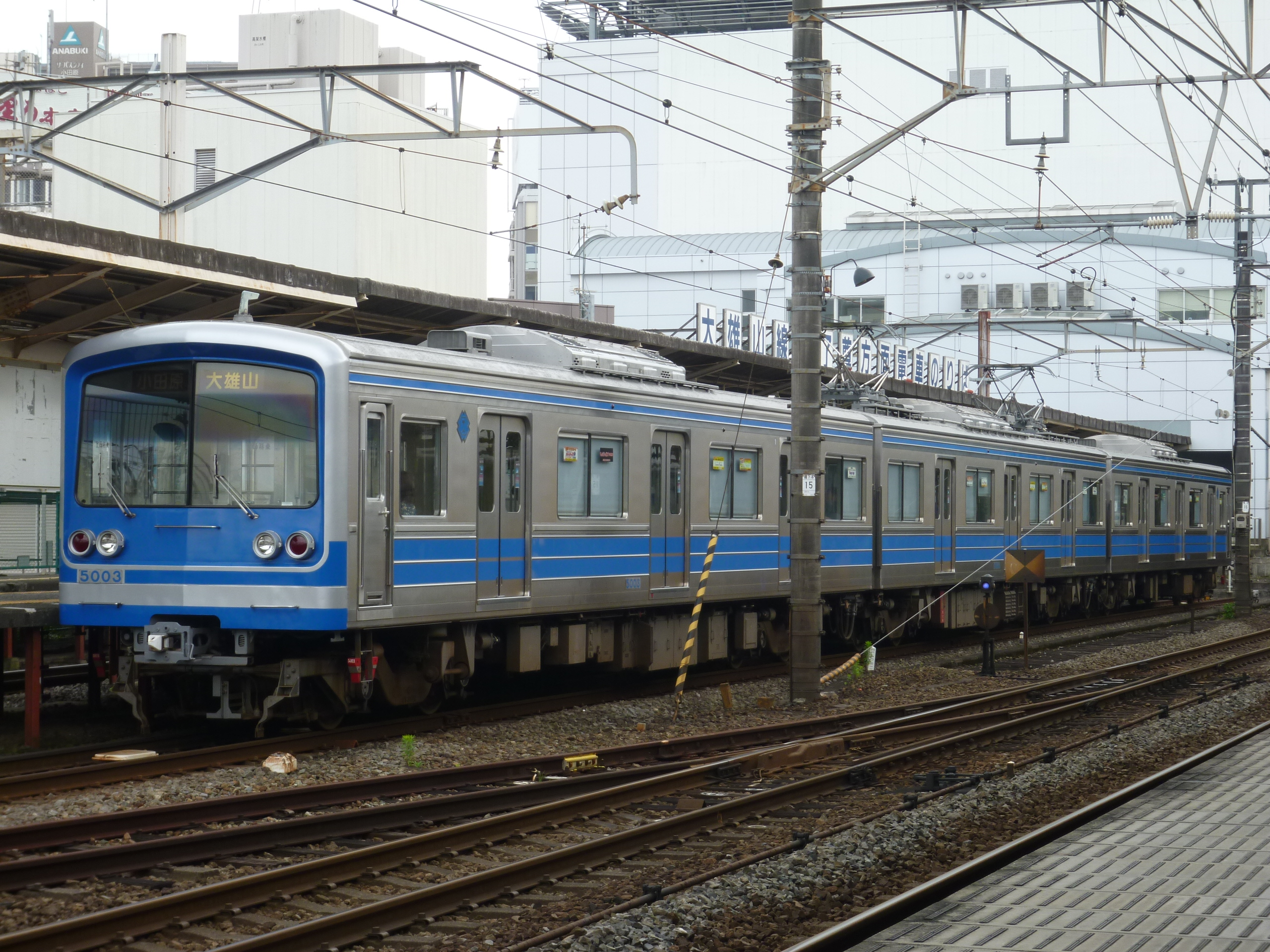
Set 5003 in July 2012

As of April 1, 2016, the line is operated using a fleet of seven three-car 5000 series electric multiple unit (EMU) trainsets.

== History ==
The line opened on October 15, 1925, as the Daiyūzan Railway, between Kari-Odawara Station (仮小田原駅) and Daiyūzan Station, with a track gauge of 1,067 mm (3 ft 6 in) and an overhead power supply of 600 V. The terminus of the line was moved from Kari-Odawara to Shin-Odawara Station (新小田原駅), close to the present-day Midorichō Station on April 10, 1927, and finally to Odawara Station on June 16, 1935. The Daiyūzan Line was merged with the Sunzu Line on August 23, 1941, and became part of the Izuhakone Railway from June 1, 1957. From November 25, 1976, the power rating on the line was raised from 600 volts to 1,500 volts. Automatic ticket gates were installed on all stations by 2003, and were upgraded to accept both the Suica and PASMO IC Card systems by March 2007.

== See also ==
- List of railway lines in Japan
