= Kaisei Station =

Railway station in Kaisei, Kanagawa Prefecture, Japan

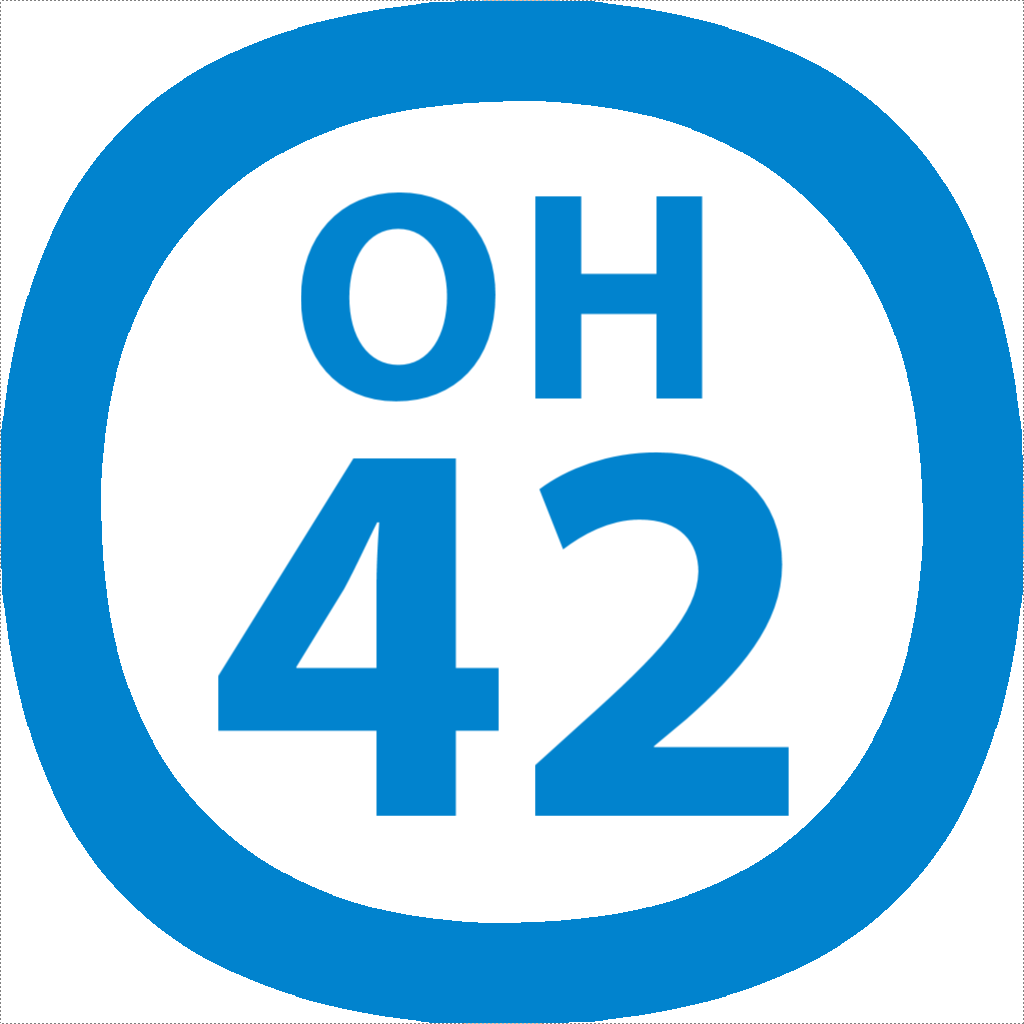
Kaisei Station 開成駅

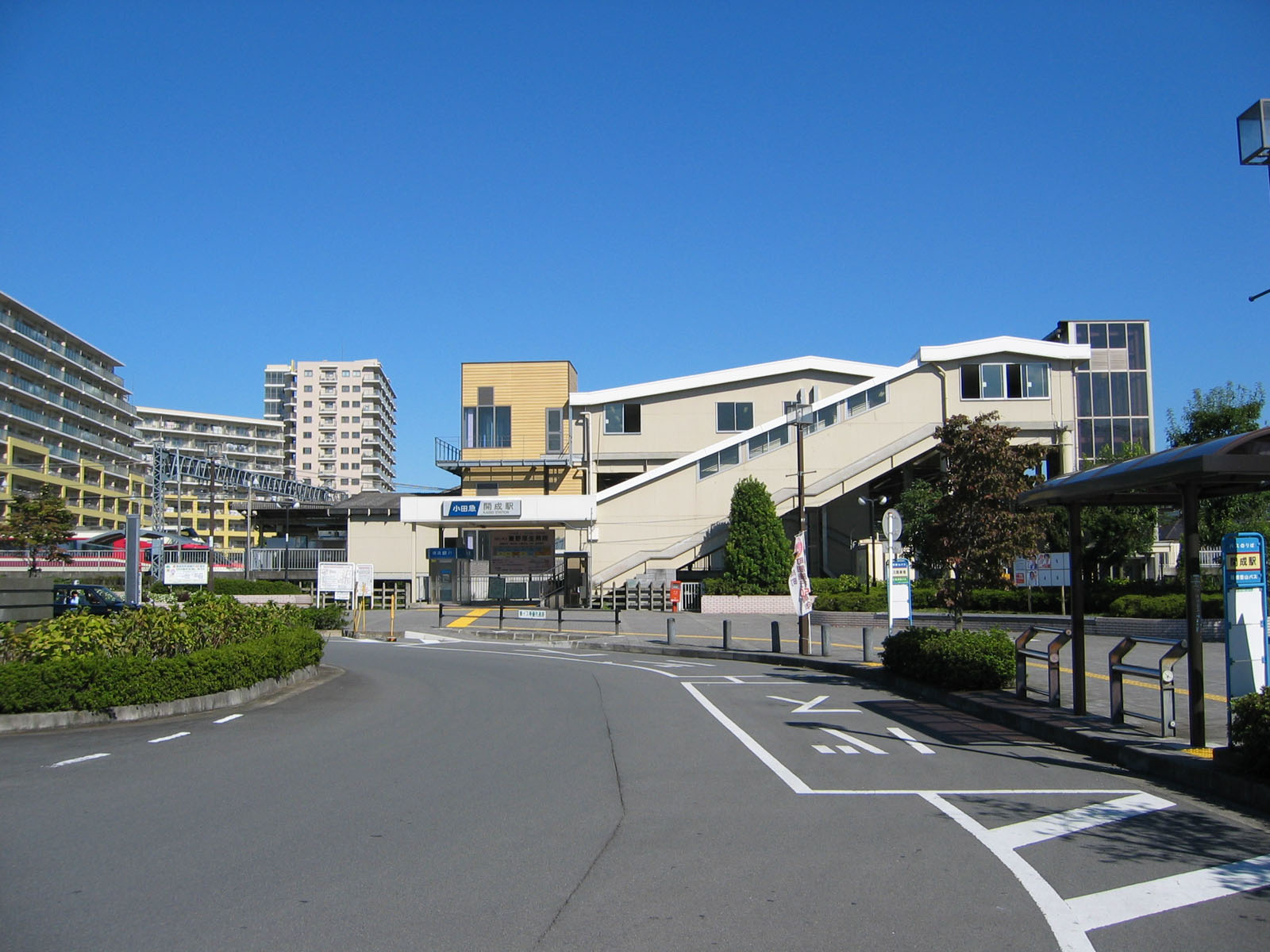
- West Exit of Kaisei Station, October 2005

General information
- Location: Yoshidajima 4300-1, Kaisei-machi, Ashigarakami-gun, Kanagawa-ken 258-0021; Japan
- Coordinates: 35°19′34.6″N 139°08′09.2″E
- Operator: Odakyu Electric Railway
- Line: ■ Odakyu Odawara Line
- Distance: 74.3 km from Shinjuku
- Platforms: 2 side platforms
- Tracks: 2

Other information
- Status: Staffed
- Station code: OH-42
- Website: Official website

History
- Opened: March 4, 1985; 41 years ago

Passengers
- FY2019: 12,350 daily

Services
Preceding station	Odakyu	Following station
Odawara Terminus	Odawara Line Rapid Express	Shin-Matsuda towards Shinjuku
Odawara Terminus	Odawara Line Express	Shin-Matsuda towards Shinjuku or Yoyogi-Uehara
Kayama towards Odawara	Odawara Line Local	Shin-Matsuda towards Shinjuku or Yoyogi-Uehara
Location
- Location within Kanagawa Prefecture Location within Japan

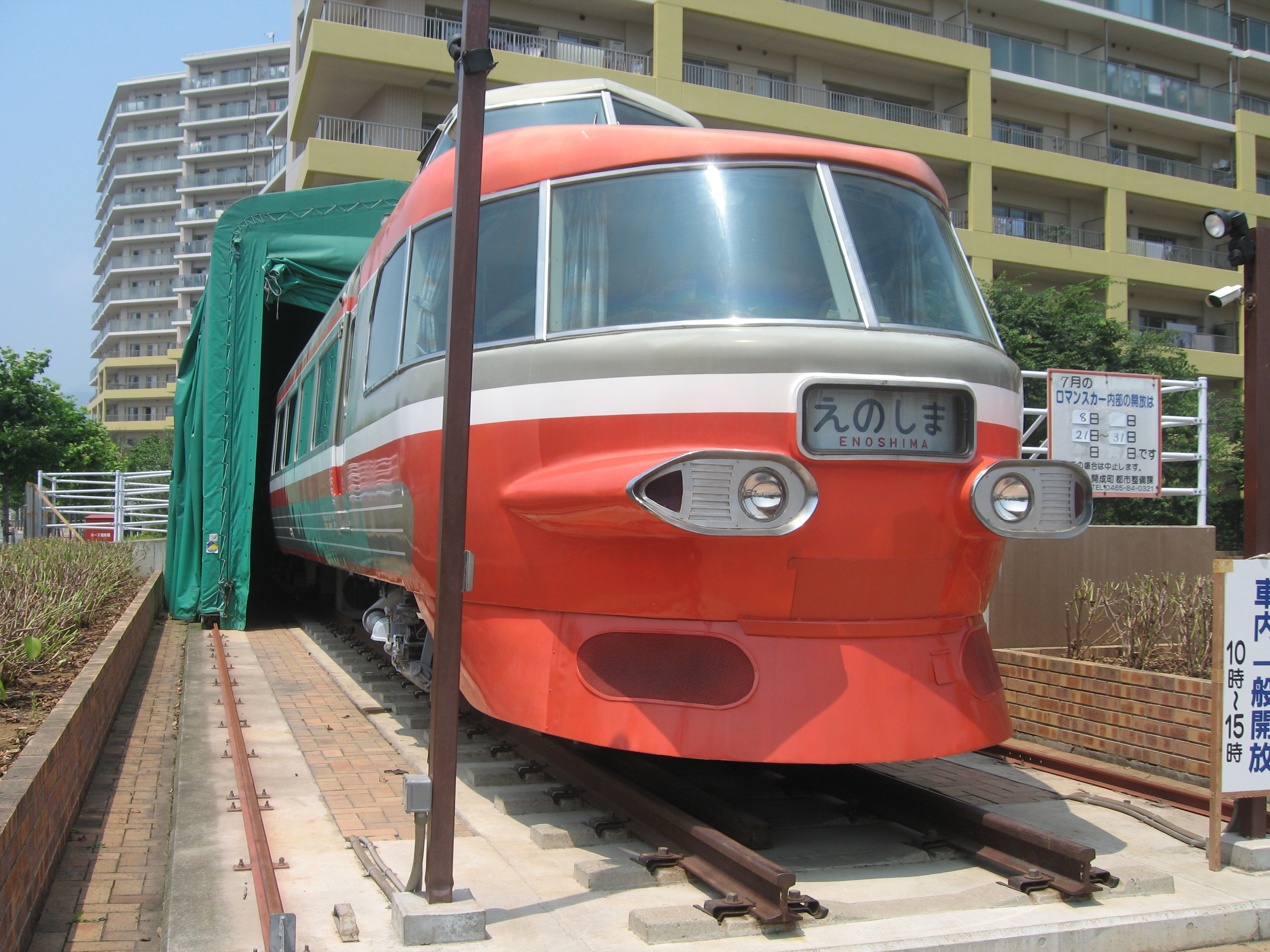
Preserved Odakyū 3100 series NSE railcar in front of the station

Kaisei Station (開成駅, Kaisei-eki) is a passenger railway station located in the town of Kaisei, Ashigarakami District, Kanagawa Prefecture, Japan. The station operated by the Odakyu Electric Railway.

== Lines ==
Kaisei Station is served by the Odakyu Odawara Line and is 74.3 kilometers from the line’s terminal at Shinjuku Station.

== Station layout ==
Kaisei Station has two opposed side platforms with two tracks. The station building is built on a cantilevered structure above and to a right angle with the platforms and tracks. An Odakyū 3100 series NSE railcar is preserved in the park outside the east exit of the station .

=== Platforms ===
1	■ Odakyu Odawara Line	For Odawara
2	■ Odakyu Odawara Line	For Shin-Matsuda, Sagami-Ono, Shin-Yurigaoka, and Shinjuku

== History ==
Kaisei Station was opened on 4 March 1985 with normal and 6-car limited express services.

Station numbering was introduced in January 2014 with Kaisei being assigned station number OH42.

== Passenger statistics ==
In fiscal 2019, the station was used by an average of 12,350 passengers daily (boarding passengers only).

The passenger figures (boarding passengers only) for previous years are as shown below.

Fiscal year	daily average
2005	8,278
2010	10,004
2015	10,736

== Bus services ==
- Hakone Tozan Bus
  - for Sekimoto (Daiyuzan Station) via Wadagahara Station

== Surrounding area ==
- Kaisei Municipal Kaisei Minami Elementary School

== See also ==
- List of railway stations in Japan
