= Mount Iwahara =

Mountain in Takarazuka, Hyōgo Prefecture, Japan

- 岩原山
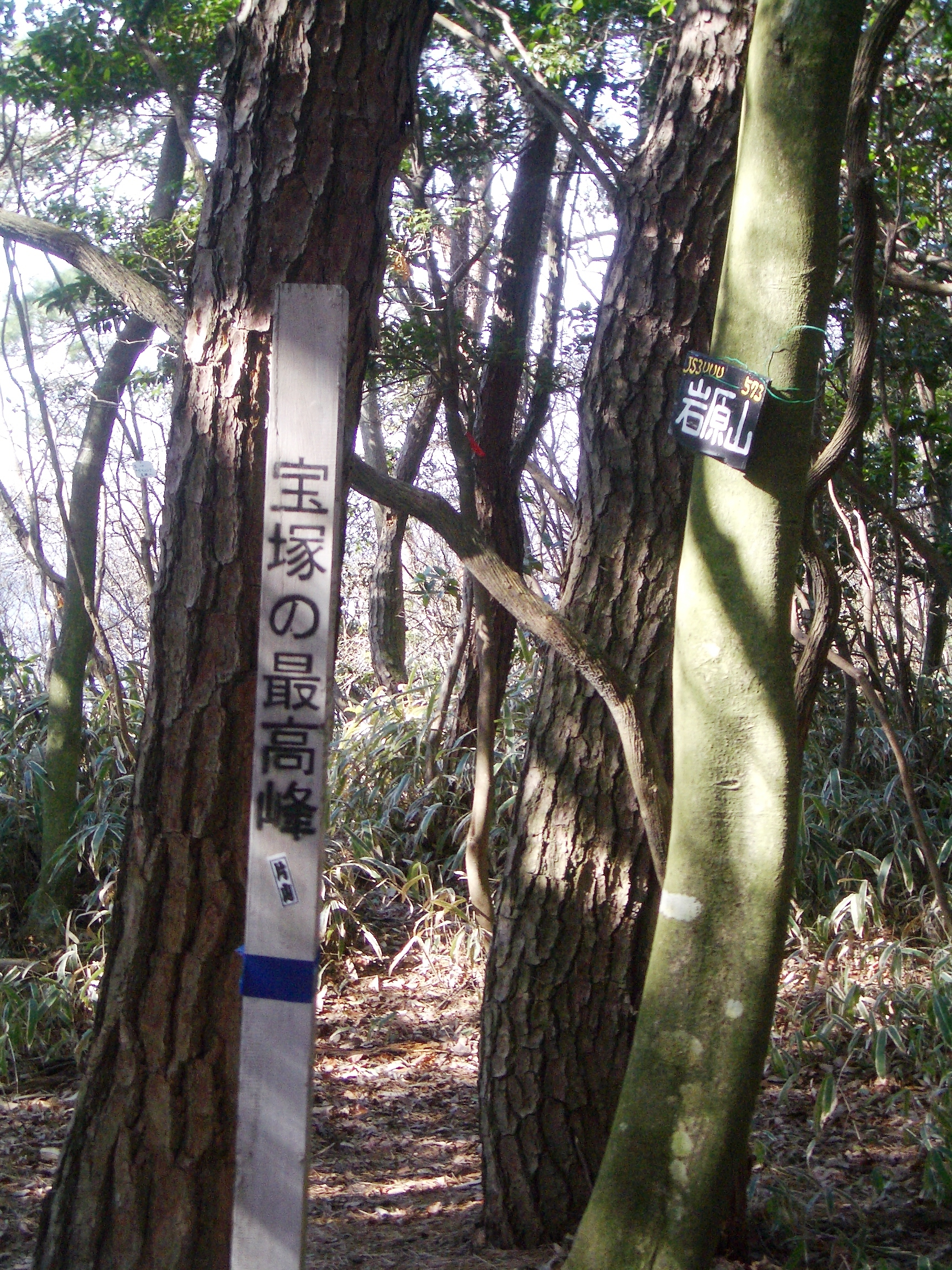
- Top of the Mt. Iwahara

Highest point
- Elevation: 573.0 m (1,879.9 ft)
- Coordinates: 34°48′N 135°18′E

Naming
- Pronunciation: Japanese: [iwahaɾajama]

Geography
- Location: Takarazuka, Hyōgo, Japan
- Parent range: Rokko Mountains

Mount Iwahara (岩原山, Iwahara-yama) is a 573.0 metre high Japanese mountain in Takarazuka, Hyōgo, Japan.

== Outline ==
Mount Iwahara is a part of Setonaikai National Park. The mountain is a peak on the East Ridge of the Rokko Mountains. The mountain is the highest mountain in Takarazuka City.

== Access ==
- Eden no Sono Bus Stop of Hankyu Bus
- Shirubeiwa Bus Stop of Hankyu Bus
