= Daiyūzan Station =

Railway station in Minamiashigara, Kanagawa Prefecture, Japan

Daiyūzan Station 大雄山駅
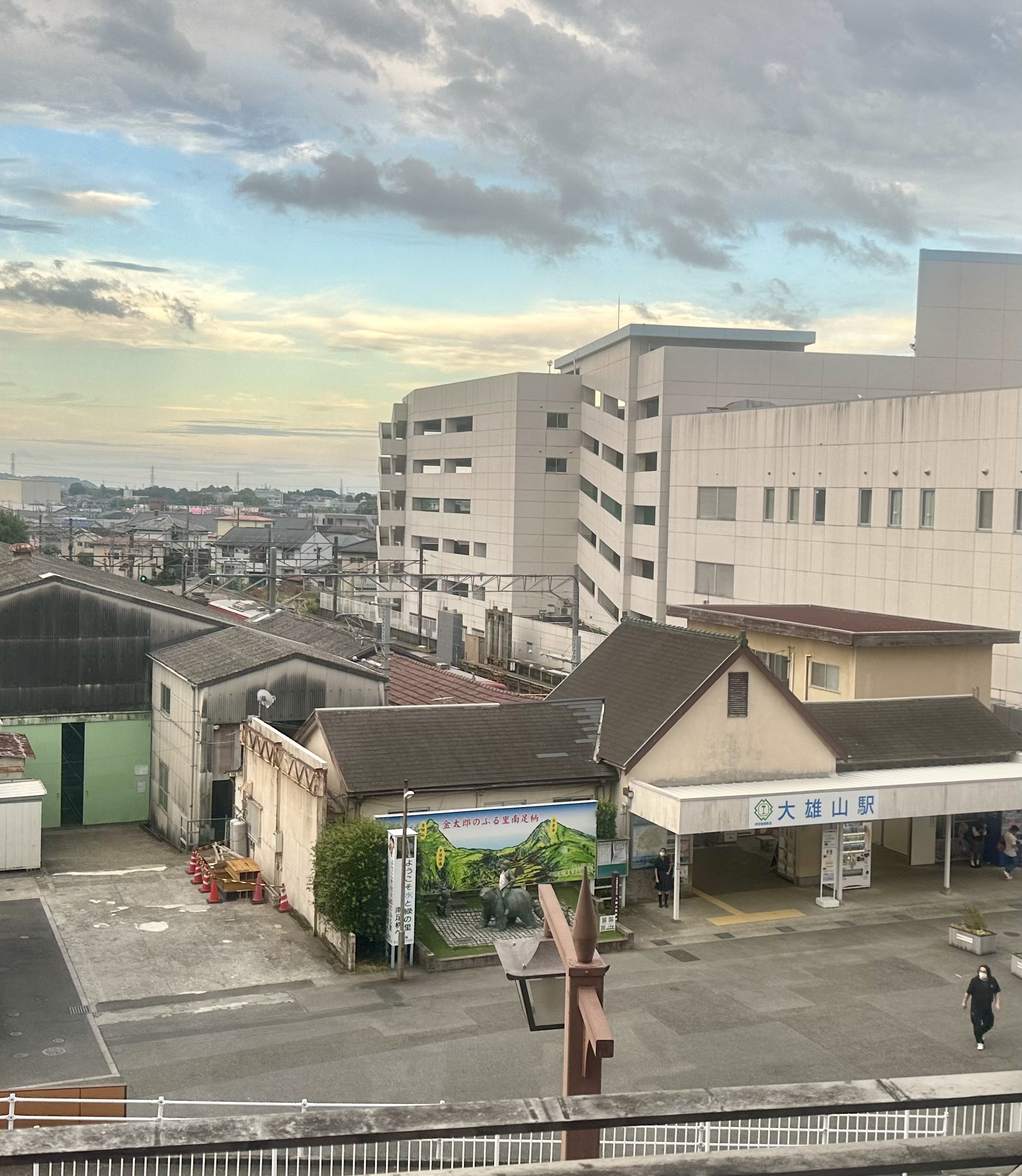
- Daiyūzan Station, June 2025

General information
- Location: 592-1 Sekimoto, Minamiashigara-shi, Kanagawa-ken 250-0105; Japan
- Coordinates: 35°19′09″N 139°06′11.25″E
- Operator: Izuhakone Railway
- Line: Daiyūzan Line
- Distance: 9.6 km from Odawara.
- Platforms: 1 island platform
- Connections: Bus stop

Other information
- Station code: ID12
- Website: Official website

History
- Opened: October 15, 1925

Passengers
- FY2019: 2,458 daily boarding passengers
Location
- Location within Kanagawa Prefecture Location within Japan

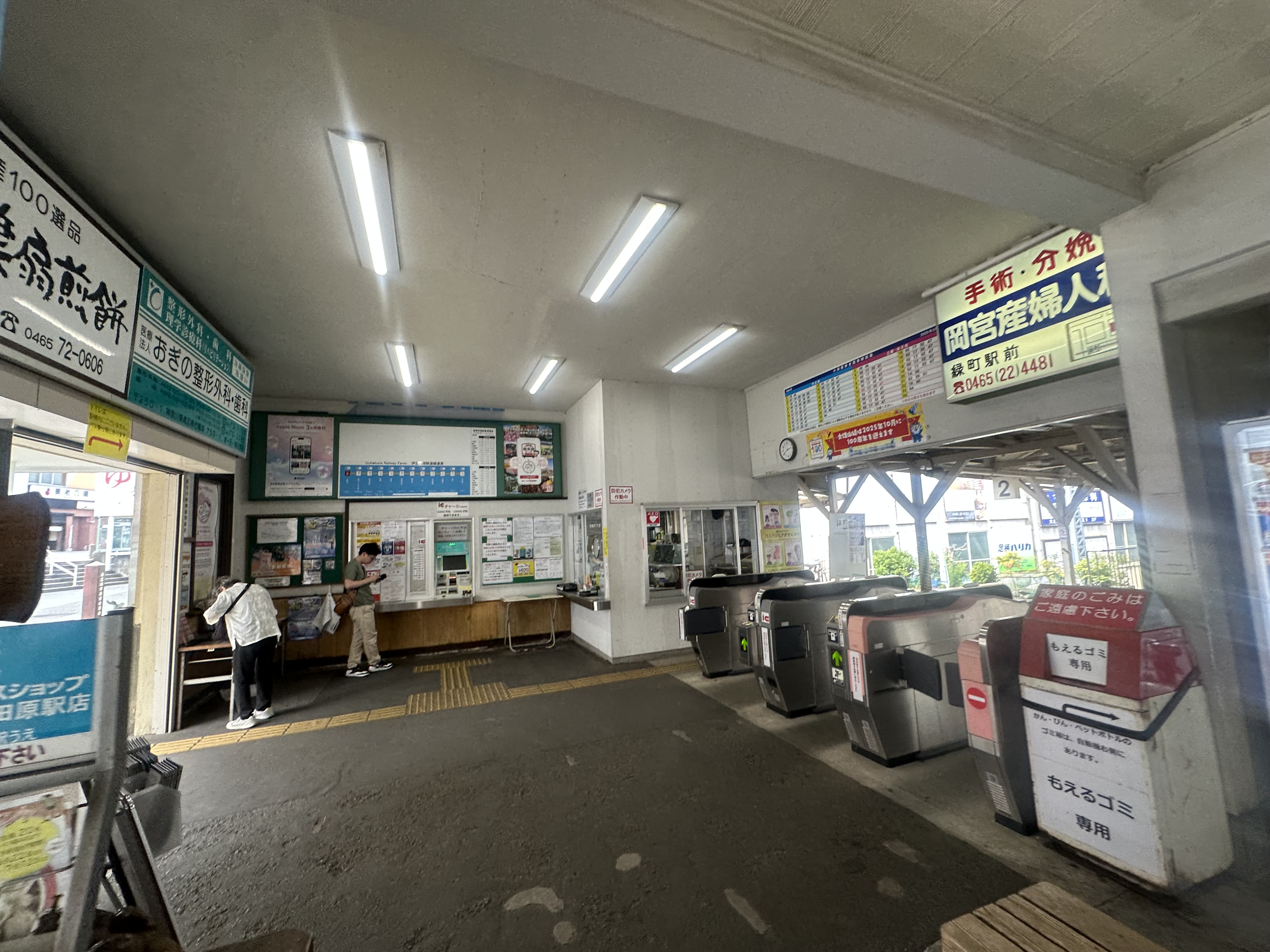
Ticket gates, 2025

Daiyūzan Station (大雄山駅, Daiyūzan-eki) is a passenger railway station located in the city of Minamiashigara, Kanagawa Prefecture, Japan, operated by the Izuhakone Railway.

== Lines ==
Daiyūzan Station is a terminus of the Daiyūzan Line, and is located 9.6 kilometers from the opposing terminus at Odawara Station.

== Station layout ==
The station consists of one island platform connected to a connected to a one-story station building.

=== Platforms ===
1	■ Daiyūzan Line	for Odawara
2	■ Daiyūzan Line	for Odawara

== Adjacent stations ==
←	Service	→
Fujifilm-Mae	Daiyūzan Line	Terminus

== Station history ==
Daiyūzan Station was opened on October 15, 1925.

== Passenger statistics ==
In fiscal 2019, the station was used by an average of 2,458 passengers daily (boarding passengers only).

The passenger figures (boarding passengers only) for previous years are as shown below.

Fiscal year	daily average
2005	2,438
2010	2,623
2015	2,611

== Bus services ==
- Izuhakone Bus
  - for Doryoson (Saijoji Temple)
- Hakone Tozan Bus
  - for Odakyu Shin-Matsuda Station
  - for Odakyu Kaisei Station via Wadagahara Station
  - for Jizodo via Yagurasawa, for Ashigara Man'yo koen (Ashigara Pass)

== Surrounding area ==
- Minamiashigara City Hall
- Minamiashigara City Cultural Center
- Minamiashigara Elementary School

== See also ==
- List of railway stations in Japan
