= Kamonomiya Station (Kanagawa) =

Railway station in Odawara, Kanagawa Prefecture, Japan

JT15 Kamonomiya Station 鴨宮駅
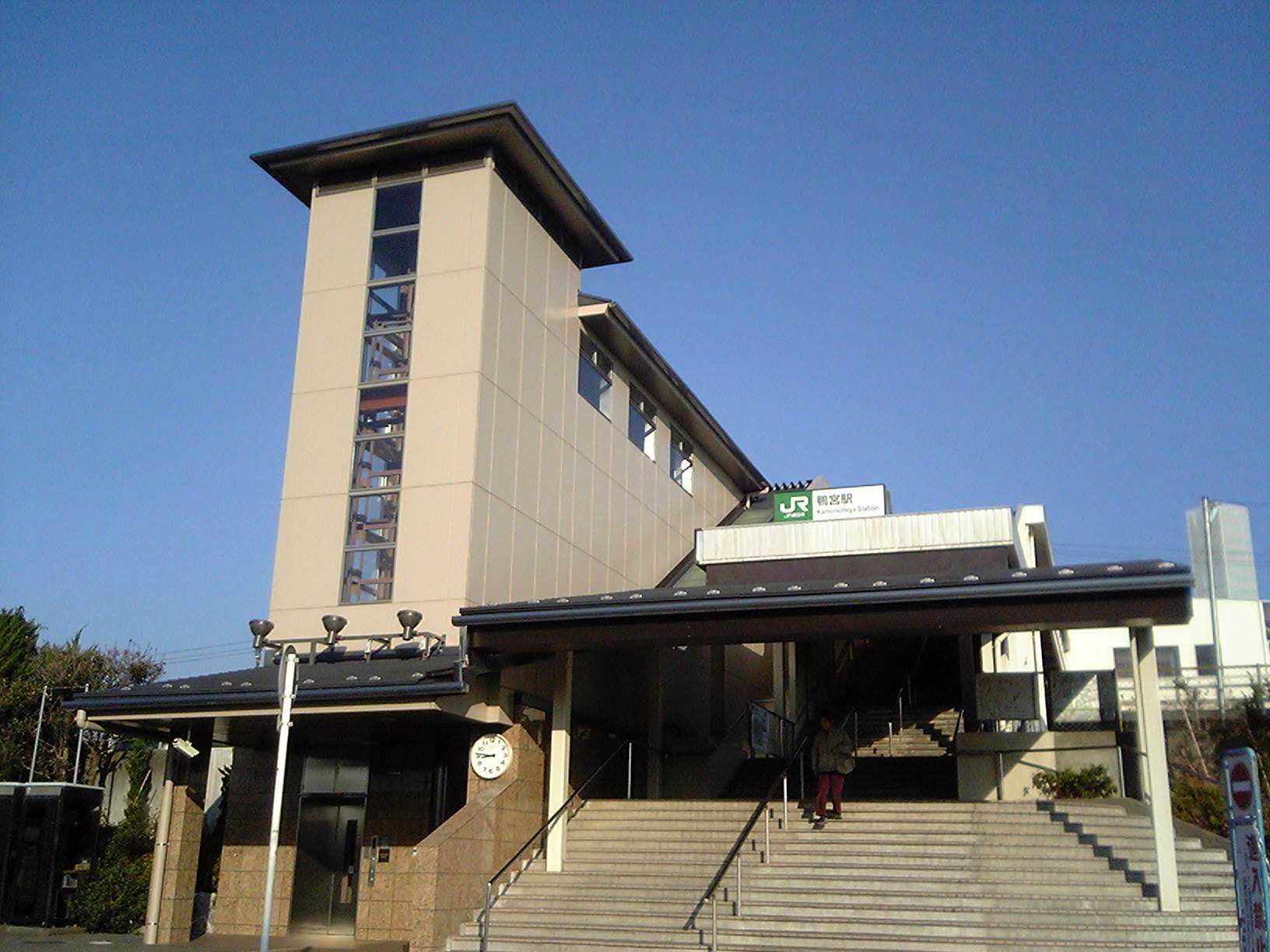
- Exit of Kamonomiya Station

General information
- Location: 30 Kamonomiya, Odawara-shi, Kanagawa-ken 250-0874; Japan
- Coordinates: 35°16′33″N 139°10′49″E
- Operator: JR East
- Line: ■ Tōkaidō Main Line
- Distance: 80.8 km from Tokyo.
- Platforms: 1 island platform
- Connections: Bus terminal

Other information
- Status: Staffed
- Station code: JT15
- Website: Official website

History
- Opened: June 1, 1923

Passengers
- FY2019: 12,432 daily

Services
Preceding station	JR East	Following station
Odawara JT16 towards Atami	Tōkaidō Line	Kōzu JT14 towards Tokyo
Odawara JT16 Terminus	Shōnan–Shinjuku Line Rapid	Kōzu JT14 towards Maebashi
Location
- Location within Kanagawa Prefecture Location within Japan

Kamonomiya Station (鴨宮駅, Kamonomiya-eki) is a passenger railway station located in the city of Odawara, Kanagawa Prefecture, Japan, operated by the East Japan Railway Company (JR East).

== Lines ==
Kamonomiya Station is served by the Tōkaidō Main Line, and is located 80.8 kilometers from the line's terminus at Tokyo Station. Some trains of the Shōnan-Shinjuku Line also stop at this station.

== Station layout ==
Kamonomiya Station has a single island platform serving two tracks, with the station building is built on a cantilevered structure on top of the tracks and platform. The station is staffed.

=== Platforms ===
1	Tokaido Line (Ueno-Tokyo Line)	for Kōzu, Hiratsuka, Yokohama, Tokyo, Ueno, Ōmiya; Utsunomiya Line for Utsunomiya and Kuroiso; Takasaki Line for Takasaki and Maebashi
1	Shōnan-Shinjuku Line	for Yokohama, Shibuya, Shinjuku, Ikebukuro, Ōmiya and Takasaki (via Takasaki Line)
2	Tōkaidō Line	for Odawara, Atami, Numazu; Itō Line for Itō

== History ==
Kamonomiya Station was established as Sakawagawa signal box (酒匂川信号所, Sakawagawa shingōsho) on October 21, 1920, on the Atami Line of the Japan National Railways. It was upgraded to a full station on June 1, 1923 as a station for both freight and passenger service. With the opening of the Tanna Tunnel, the Atami Line became the Tōkaidō Main Line from December 1, 1934. Regularly scheduled freight services were discontinued in 1970, and parcel services by 1972. The current station building was completed in 1976. With the completion of Quadruple tracks between Odawara and Ofuna, freight services were resumed as of March 31, 1987. With the dissolution and privatization of the JNR on April 1, 1987, the station came under the control of the East Japan Railway Company and the Japan Freight Railway Company. Automated turnstiles using the Suica IC Card system came into operation from November 18, 2001.

== Passenger statistics ==
In fiscal 2019, the station was used by an average of 12,432 passengers daily.

The passenger figures (boarding passengers only) for previous years are as shown below.

Fiscal year	daily average
2005	12,122
2010	12,593
2015	12,851

== Surrounding area ==
Kamonomiya is located east of central Odawara, and is home to several of Odawara's main shopping areas including Dynacity, Odawara City Mall and Robinsons. The area around Kamonomiya also contains a number of restaurants, bowling alleys, Karaoke bars, and Odawara's only movie theatres: Toho Cinema (near Robinsons) and Korona World.

The Korona World complex also contains an Onsen hot-spring bath.
