= Odawara Station =

Railway station in Odawara, Kanagawa Prefecture, Japan

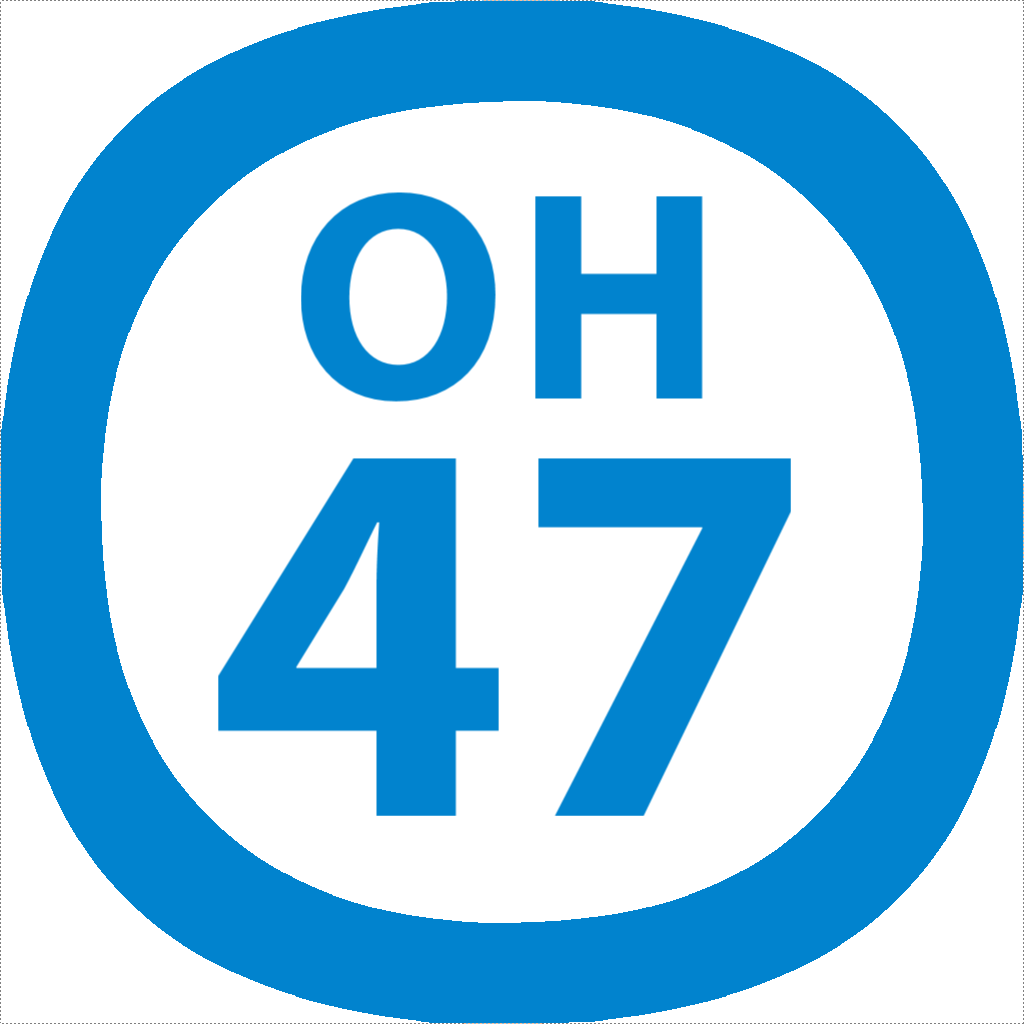
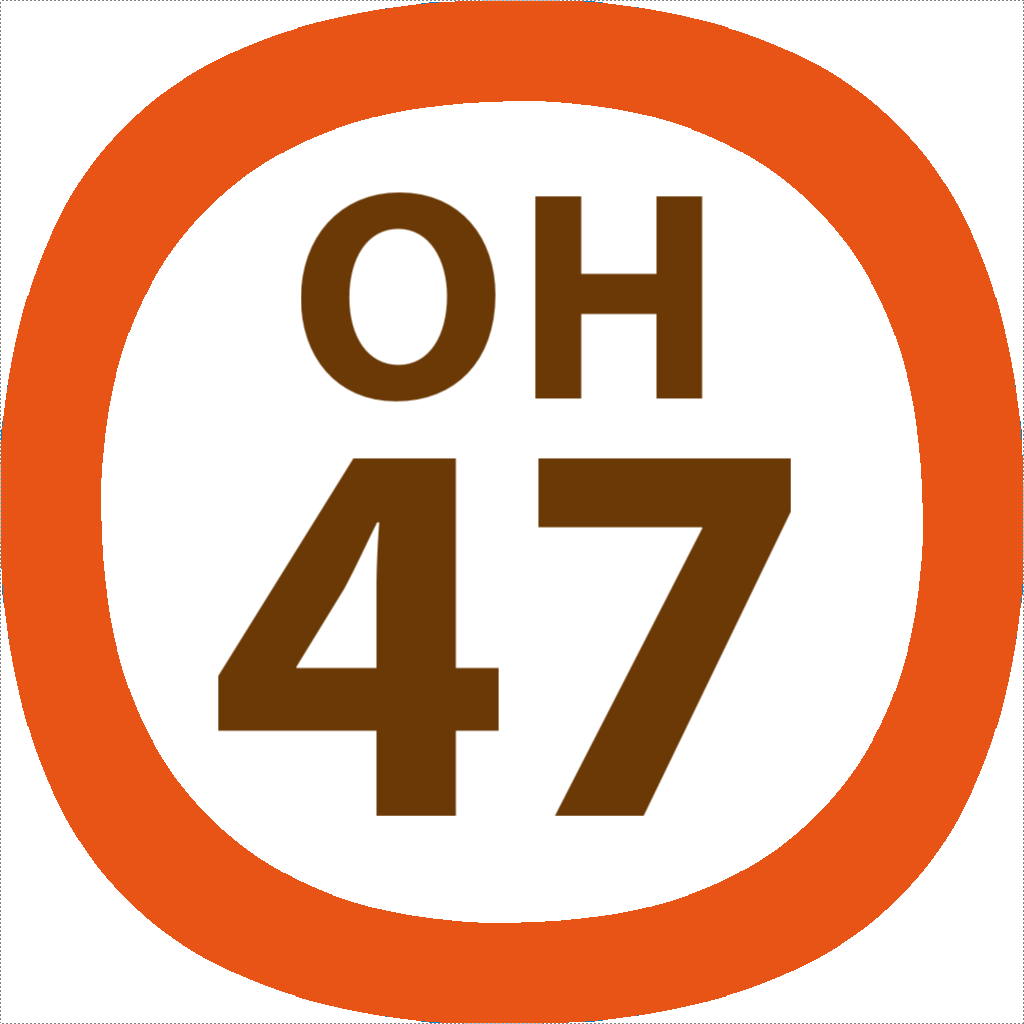
JT16 Odawara Station 小田原駅

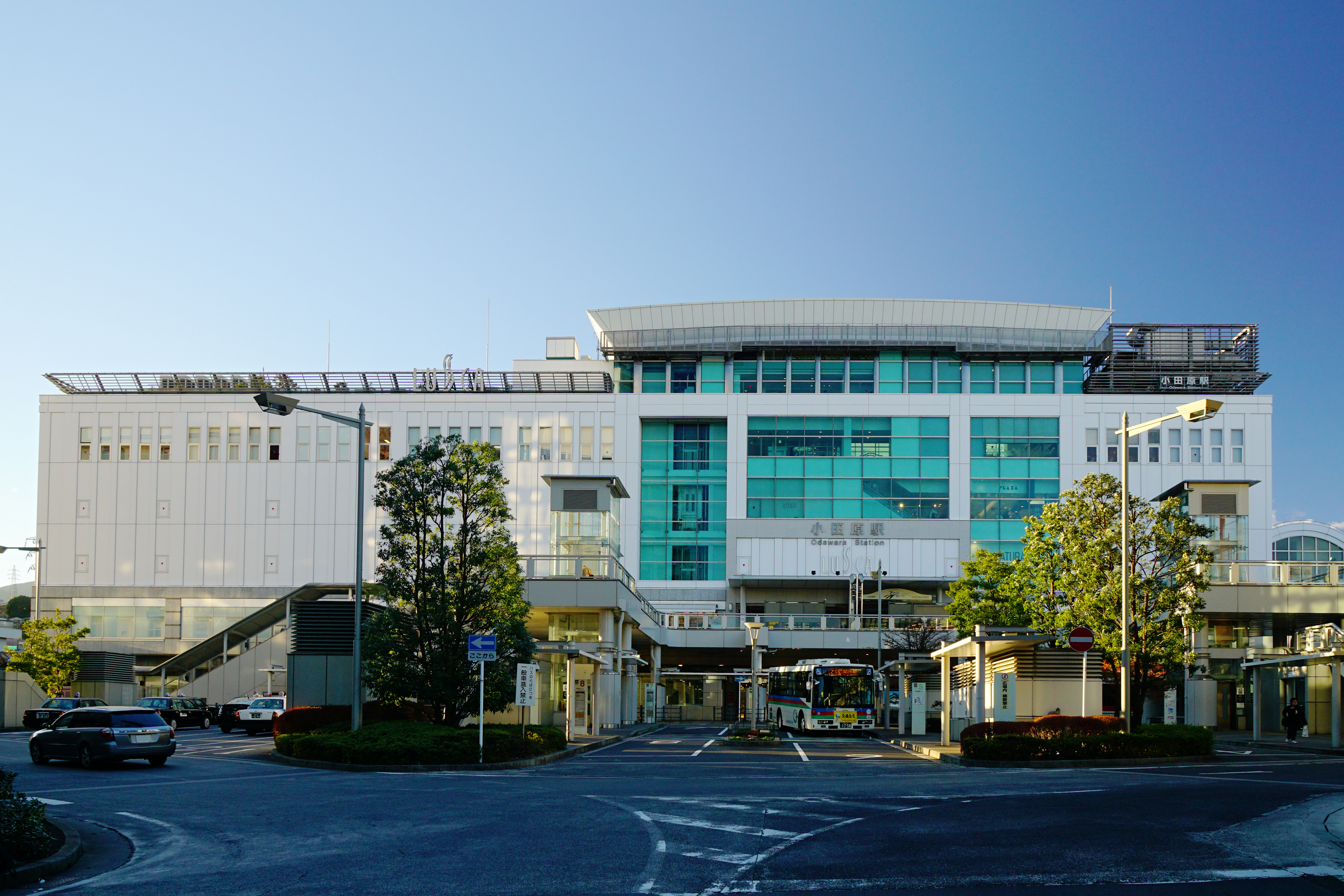
- Odawara Station in December 2016

General information
- Location: 1 Sakaechō, Odawara City, Kanagawa Prefecture; Japan
- Coordinates: 35°15′23″N 139°09′18″E
- Operator: JR East; JR Central; JR Freight; Odakyu Electric Railway; Izuhakone Railway
- Lines: Tōkaidō Shinkansen; Tokaido Main Line; Odakyu Odawara Line; Izu-Hakone Railway Daiyuzan Line; Hakone Tozan Line
- Platforms: 2 side + 2 island + 2 bay platforms
- Connections: Bus terminal

Other information
- Status: Staffed (Midori no Madoguchi)

History
- Opened: 21 October 1920; 105 years ago

Passengers
- FY 2023: 58,522 daily (JR East); 20,930 daily (JR Central); 55,823 daily (Odakyu)

Services
Preceding station	JR Central	Following station
Atami towards Shin-Ōsaka	Tōkaidō Shinkansen Hikari Kodama	Shin-Yokohama towards Tokyo
Other services
Preceding station	JR East	Following station
Yugawara JT20 towards Itō or Atami	Odoriko	Ofuna towards Tokyo
Terminus	Shōnan	Kōzu JT14 towards Tokyo or Shinjuku
Hayakawa JT17 towards Atami	Tōkaidō Line	Kamonomiya JT15 towards Tokyo
Terminus	Shōnan–Shinjuku Line Special Rapid	Kōzu JT14 towards Maebashi
Terminus	Shōnan–Shinjuku Line Rapid	Kamonomiya JT15 towards Maebashi
Preceding station	Odakyu	Following station
Hakone-Yumoto Terminus	Romancecar	Hadano towards Shinjuku or Kita-Senju
Terminus	Odawara Line Rapid Express	Kaisei towards Shinjuku
Terminus	Odawara Line Express	Kaisei towards Shinjuku or Yoyogi-Uehara
through to Hakone Tozan Line	Odawara Line Local	Ashigara towards Shinjuku or Yoyogi-Uehara
Hakone-Itabashi towards Hakone-Yumoto	Hakone Tozan Line Local	through to Odawara Line
Preceding station	Izuhakone Railway	Following station
Terminus	Daiyūzan Line	Midorichō towards Daiyūzan
Location
- Location within Kanagawa Prefecture Location within Kanto Area Location within Japan

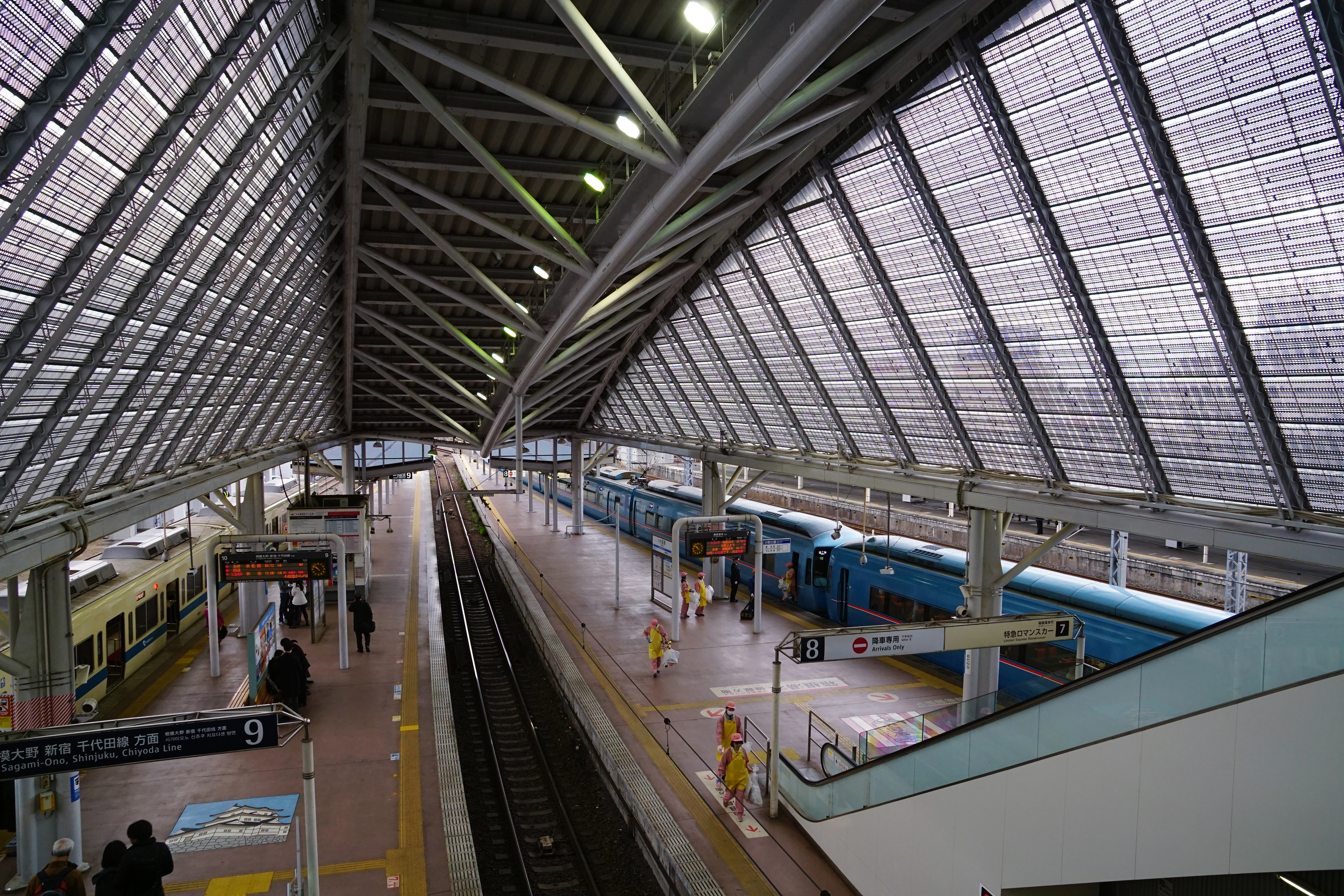
Odakyu platforms

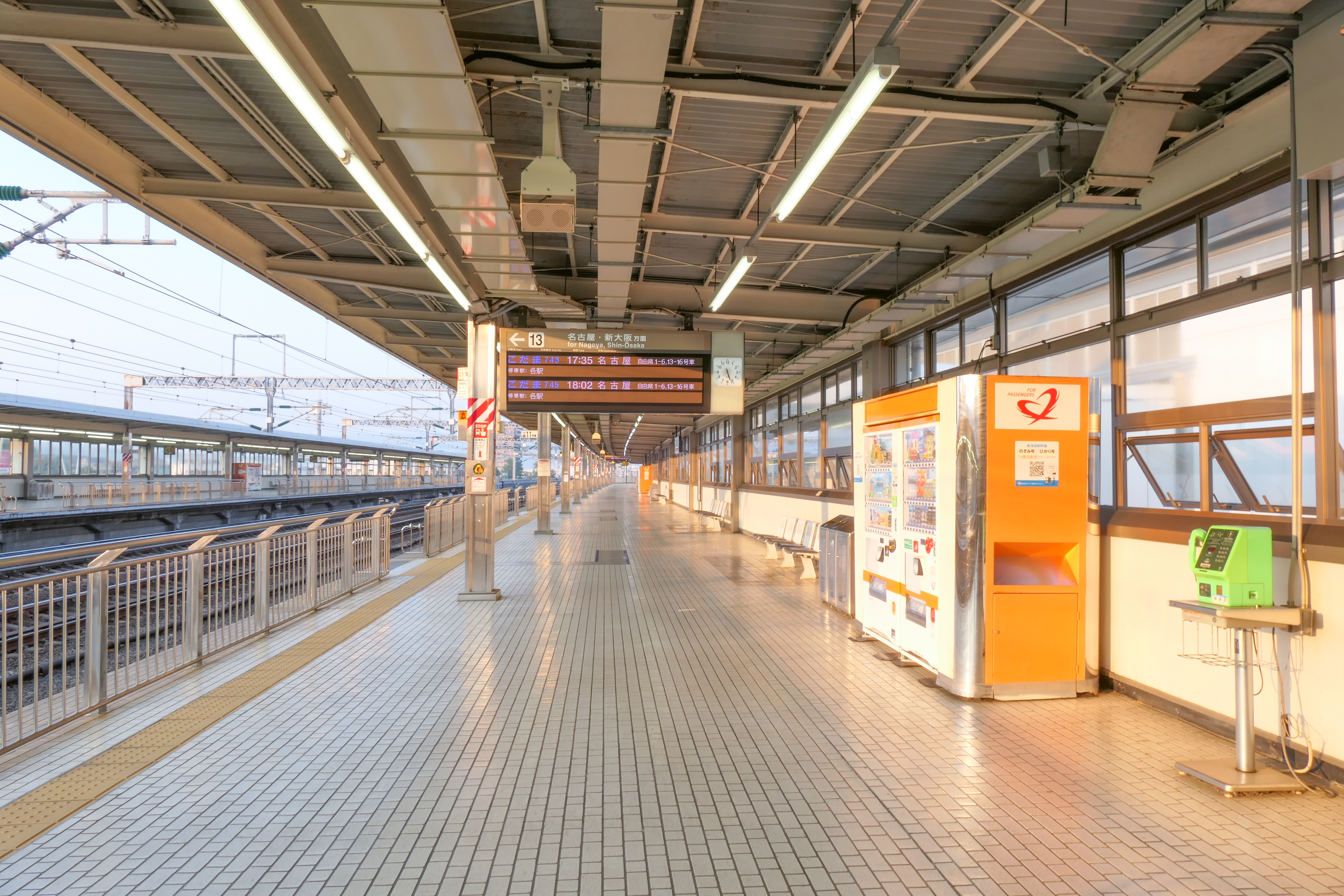
Tokaido Shinkansen platforms

Odawara Station (小田原駅, Odawara-eki) is a junction and interchange railway station located in the city of Odawara, Kanagawa, Japan, operated jointly by the East Japan Railway Company (JR East) and Central Japan Railway Company (JR Tōkai). It is a gateway station to the Hakone area. It is also a freight depot for the Japan Freight Railway Company.

== Lines ==
Odawara Station is a station on the Tōkaidō Shinkansen with regional service provided by the Tōkaidō Main Line. It is located 83.9 kilometers from the terminus of these lines at Tokyo Station. Some trains of the Shōnan-Shinjuku Line also stop at Odawara. Local services are provided by the private railway companies Odakyu Electric Railway (Odawara Line), Izu-Hakone Railway (Daiyuzan Line) and the Hakone Tozan Railway (Hakone Tozan Line), all of which terminate at Odawara Station.

== Station layout ==
Odawara Station has a complex platform layout. The Tōkaidō Shinkansen has two elevated opposed side platforms. Tōkaidō Main Line and Shōnan-Shinjuku Line trains operated from two island platforms. The JR companies have staffed Midori no Madoguchi ticket offices and seat reservation counters. The Izu-Hakone Railway has two bay platforms. The Odakyu Electric Railway and Hakone Tozan Railway share two island platforms with a cutout arrangement.

=== Izu-Hakone Railway platforms ===
1,2	Izu-Hakone Railway Daiyuzan Line	for Sagami-Numata and Daiyuzan

=== JR East platforms ===
3	Tōkaidō Main Line	for Atami, Numazu; Itō Line for Itō
4	Tōkaidō Main Line	for Atami, Numazu; Itō Line for Itō
4	Tōkaidō Line (Ueno-Tokyo Line)	for Kōzu, Hiratsuka, Yokohama, Tokyo, Ueno, Ōmiya; Utsunomiya Line for Utsunomiya and Kuroiso; Takasaki Line for Takasaki and Maebashi
5, 6	Tōkaidō Main Line (Ueno-Tokyo Line)	for Kōzu, Hiratsuka, Yokohama, Tokyo, Ueno, Ōmiya; Utsunomiya Line for Utsunomiya and Kuroiso; Takasaki Line for Takasaki and Maebashi
5, 6	Shōnan-Shinjuku Line	for Yokohama, Shibuya, Shinjuku, Ikebukuro, Ōmiya and Takasaki (via Takasaki Line)

=== Odakyu and Hakone Tozan platforms ===
7	Hakone Tozan Line	for Hakone-Yumoto (Change trains for Gora)
7	Odakyu Odawara Line	Terminating trains
8	Odakyu Odawara Line	alighting (platform 9 uses the same track)
9	Odakyu Odawara Line	for Shin-Matsuda, Sagami-Ōno, Machida, Shinjuku; Tokyo Metro Chiyoda Line for Otemachi, Kita-Senju and Ayase (via Yoyogi-Uehara); Jōban Line (Local) for Matsudo, Kashiwa and Toride (via Ayase) (platform 8 uses the same track)
10	Odakyu Odawara Line	for Shin-Matsuda, Sagami-Ōno, Machida, Shinjuku; Tokyo Metro Chiyoda Line for Otemachi, Kita-Senju and Ayase (via Yoyogi-Uehara); Joban Line (Local) for Matsudo, Kashiwa and Toride (via Ayase)
11	Hakone Tozan Line	for Hakone-Yumoto (Change trains for Gora)

=== JR Central platforms ===
13	Tōkaidō Shinkansen	for Nagoya, Kyoto, Shin-Osaka; Sanyō Shinkansen for Shin-Kobe, Okayama and Hiroshima
14	Tōkaidō Shinkansen	for Shin-Yokohama, Shinagawa and Tokyo

== History ==
What is now the JR East station opened on 21 October 1920. The Odakyu Electric Railway station opened on 1 April 1927.

Station numbering was introduced to the Odakyu Line in January 2014 with Odawara being assigned station number OH47.

=== Accidents ===
In April 2002, a person was hit and killed by a non-stop up train at the station after climbing down from the platform onto the Shinkansen track.

In July 2007, a person was hit and killed by a non-stop train at the station after climbing down from the platform onto the Shinkansen track.

In December 2008, a woman was hit and killed by a down non-stop train at the station after climbing down from the platform onto the Shinkansen track.

In April 2009, a man was hit and killed by a down non-stop train at the station after climbing down from the platform onto the Shinkansen track.

== Passenger statistics ==
In fiscal 2019, the JR East station was used by an average of 33,460 passengers daily. The Shinkansen station was used by 11,245 passengers, the Odakyu station was used by 62,396 passengers, the Hakone Tozan portion of the station by 10,638 and the Izukyu portion by 8,773 passengers.

== Surrounding area ==
- Odawara City Hall
- Odawara Castle

== See also ==
- Odawara-juku
- List of railway stations in Japan
