= Izuhakone Railway =

Japanese railway company

Izuhakone Railway (伊豆箱根鉄道)

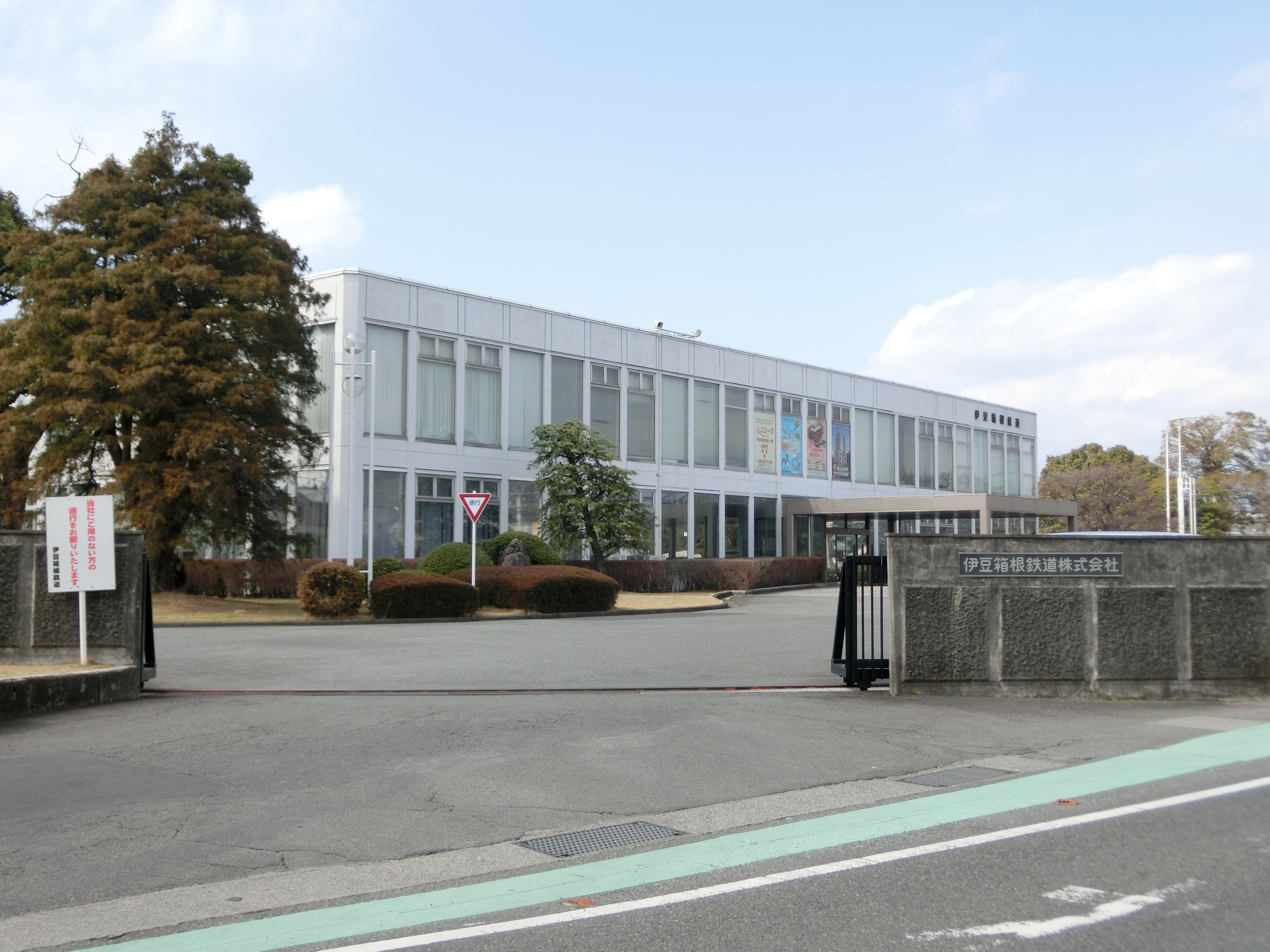
- Izuhakone Railway head office

Overview
- Main regions: Kanagawa and Shizuoka prefectures
- Parent company: Seibu Railway
- Dates of operation: 7 December 1916; 109 years ago–present
- Predecessor: Zusō Railway (豆相鉄道)

Other
- Website: www.izuhakone.co.jp

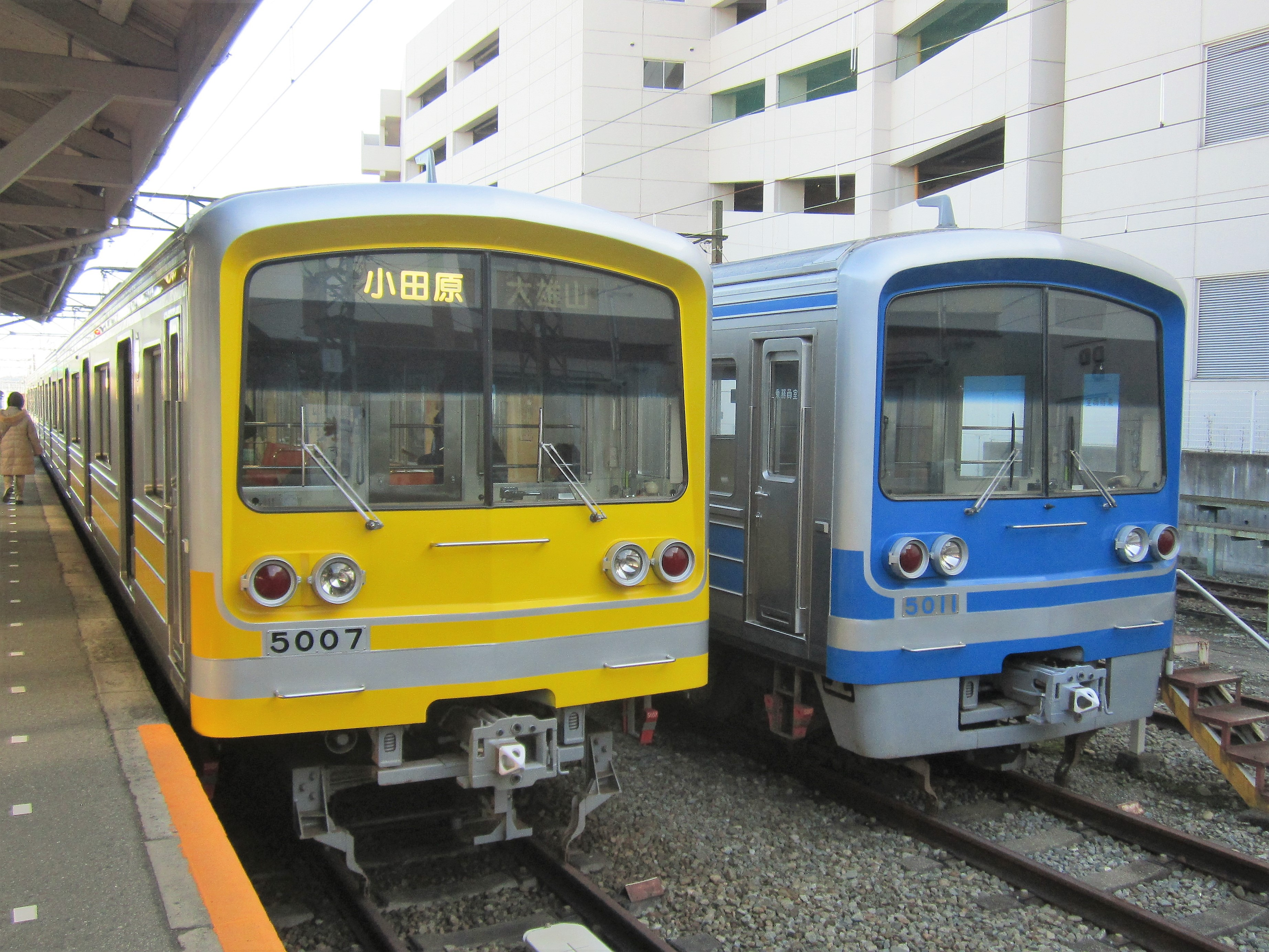
Izuhakone Railway 5000 series trains

The Izuhakone Railway (伊豆箱根鉄道, Izu Hakone Tetsudō) is a private railway company in Kanagawa Prefecture and Shizuoka Prefecture, Japan. The company also operates excursion ships, and the group companies operate buses and taxis. The company has its roots in Zusō Railway (豆相鉄道, Zusō Tetsudō) founded in 1893. Izuhakone Railway is a member of Seibu group. The Daiyūzan Line accepts PASMO, a smart card ticketing system.

== Railway lines ==
The company operates two detached lines in different prefectures. The Daiyūzan Line runs in Kanagawa Prefecture, while the Sunzu Line runs in Shizuoka Prefecture. Both lines primarily function as commuter rails, but the latter also transports tourists to the Izu Peninsula.

- Daiyūzan Line
- Sunzu Line

In the past, it also operated "Komagatake Cable Line" (駒ヶ岳鋼索線), which was connected to the ropeway at the top of the mountain from 1957 to 2005. Jukkokutōge Cable Car was transferred to Fujikyu, Hakone Komagatake Ropeway was transferred to Seibu Prince Hotels Worldwide.

== Excursion ships ==
- Lake Ashi Excursion Ship
- Mito Excursion Ship
- Lake Hamana Excursion Ship

== See also ==
- List of railway companies in Japan
