= Mount Nangō =

Mountain in the country of Japan

Coordinates: 35°10′36″N 139°06′15″E

Mount Nangō (Japanese: 南郷山, romanized: Nangō-San) is a mountain with a height of 810 meters, located about 1.0 kilometer east of Mount Maku in Yugawara, Japan. It is a volcanic lava dome formed about 150,000 years ago in the older rim of Mount Hakone.

The summit of Mount Nangō is a grass field, where one can command a view of the Manazuru Peninsula as well as the Izu Islands in Sagami Bay.

== See also ==
- Fuji-Hakone-Izu National Park
