= Michiharu =

- Gender: Male

Origin
- Origin: Japanese
- Meaning: Different meanings depending on the kanji used

Michiharu (written: 倫治, 道治, 通陽 or みちはる in hiragana) is a masculine Japanese given name. Notable people with the name include:

- Michiharu Kusunoki (楠 みちはる; born 1957), Japanese manga artist
- Michiharu Mishima (三島 通陽; 1897–1965), Japanese writer, playwright and critic
- Michiharu Otagiri (小田切 道治; born 1978), Japanese footballer
- Michiharu Ozaki (尾崎 道治; born 1953), Japanese sport shooter
- Michiharu Sugimoto (杉本 倫治; born 1981), Japanese footballer
- Umezawa Michiharu (梅沢 道治; 1853–1924), Japanese samurai and general
