= Manazuru Hantō Prefectural Natural Park =

Prefectural natural park in Japan

Coordinates: 35°08′41″N 139°9′16″E

- 県立真鶴半島自然公園
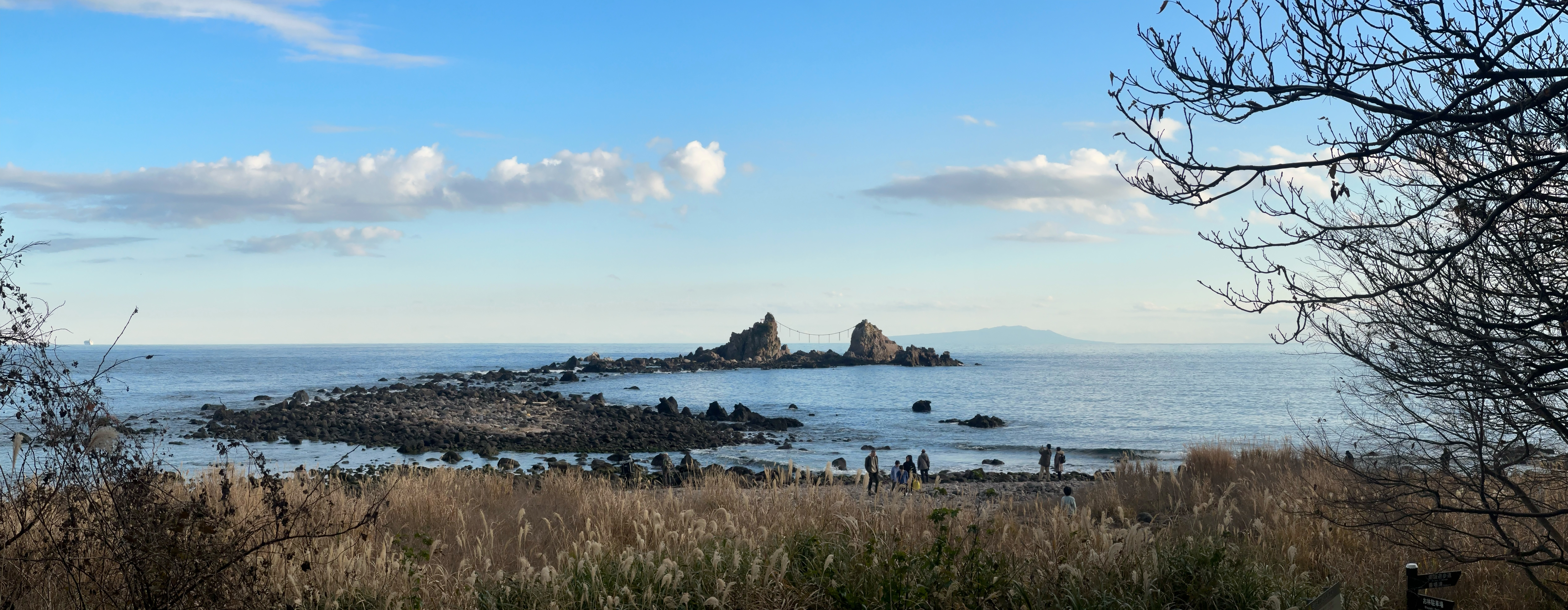
- Cape Manazuru
- Interactive map of Manazuru Hantō Prefectural Natural Park
- Location: Kanagawa Prefecture, Japan
- Area: 1.38 km^{2} (0.53 sq mi)
- Established: 18 October 1960

Manazuru Hantō Prefectural Natural Park (県立真鶴半島自然公園, Kenritsu Manazuru-hantō shizen kōen) is a Prefectural Natural Park in Kanagawa Prefecture, Japan. Established in 1960, it derives its name from the Manazuru Peninsula (真鶴半島). The park lies wholly within the municipality of Manazuru.

== See also ==
- National Parks of Japan
