= Mount Maku =

Lava dome in Japan

Coordinates: 35°10′23″N 139°5′29″E

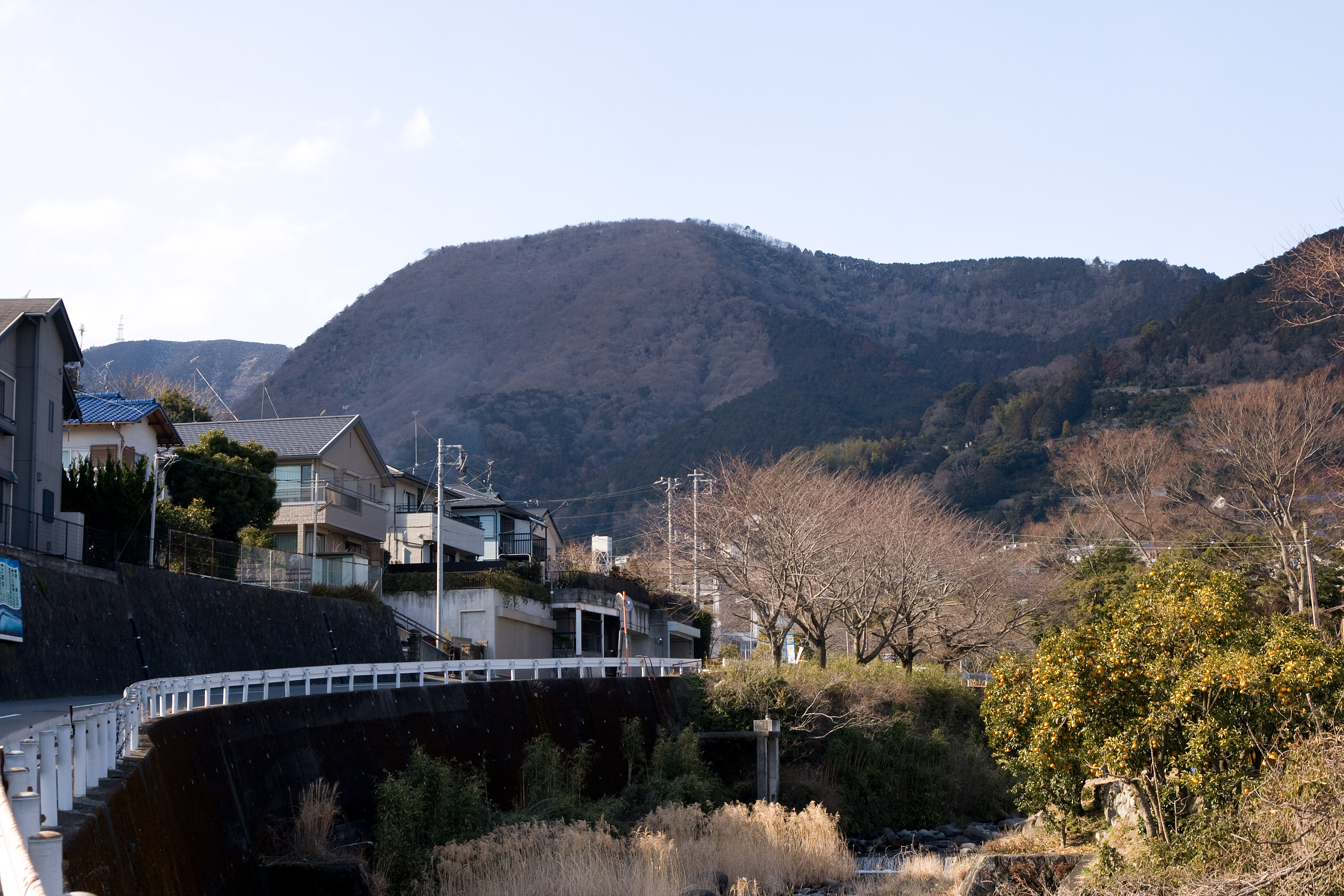
Mount Maku, in the idyllic Yugawara, Kanagawa.

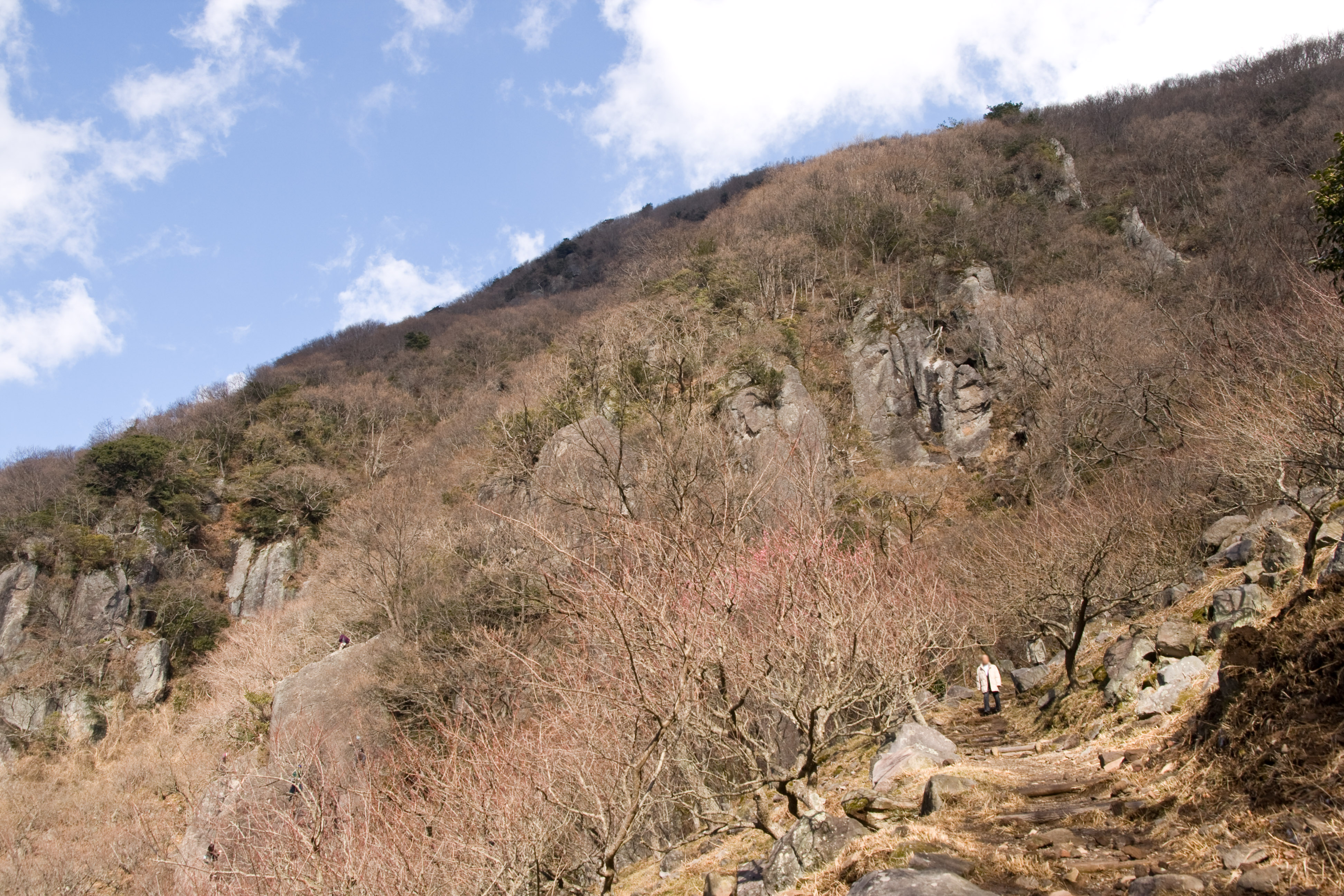
Rocks that surround Mount Maku

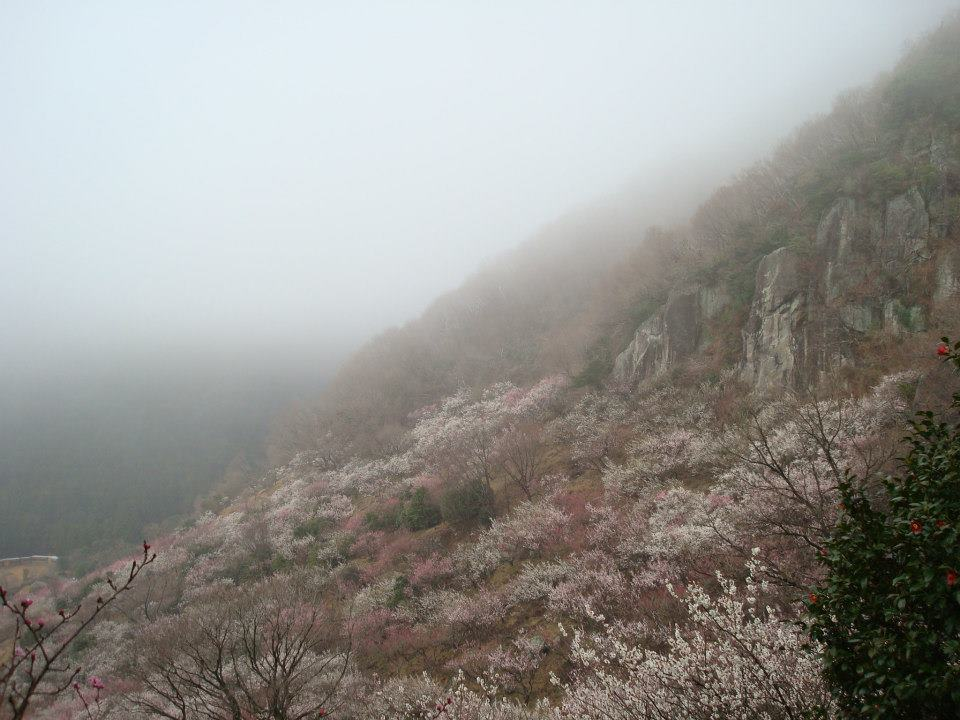
Plum trees in full bloom in Yugawara Park, at the foothills of Mount Maku.

Mount Maku (Japanese: 幕山 = Maku-Yama) is a mountain with the height of 626 meters, located in Yugawara, Kanagawa, Japan. It is a volcanic lava dome that formed about 150,000 years ago in the older rim of Mount Hakone. Its name "Maku", meaning a curtain, is said to come from the rock walls of columnar joints that surround the mountainside, alluding to the Kabuki theater stage.

Makuyama Park (幕山公園), located at the southern foot of the mountain, is famous for about 4,000 plum trees that come into bloom from early February to mid-March. They were planted around 1954 by volunteers in the local blacksmith district as a countermeasure against the landslides as well as a future tourism resource.

There are several trails to Mount Maku's summit, which takes about 70 minutes from Makuyama Park. The hikers will enjoy the gorgeous view of the streets of Yugawara, noted for its hotsprings, Manazuru Peninsula, and Sagami Bay of the Pacific Ocean.

== See also ==
- Fuji-Hakone-Izu National Park
