= Mathieu Boots =

Dutch football player (born 1975)

Personal information
- Full name: Mathieu Boots
- Date of birth: 23 June 1975 (age 51)
- Place of birth: Venhuizen, Netherlands
- Height: 1.90 m (6 ft 3 in)
- Position: Defender

Youth career
- SV De Valken

Senior career*
Years	Team	Apps	(Gls)
1997–1998	Hollandia		
1998–2001	Volendam	34	(5)
2001–2002	KV Mechelen	25	(1)
2003–2004	Yokohama FC	73	(12)
2004–2010	Volendam	139	(4)
2010–2013	Hollandia		
- * Club domestic league appearances and goals as of 13 July 2010

Mathieu Boots (born 23 June 1975 in Venhuizen) is a Dutch retired football player.

== Club career ==
A relative late newcomer, Boots made his professional debut for Volendam in an August 2000 Eerste Divisie match against VVV. He then moved abroad a year later to play for Belgian side KV Mechelen with whom he won promotion to the Eerste Klasse but got relegated after one season in the top flight.

Boots then spent two seasons in the J2 League with Yokohama FC, only to return to Volendam in 2004. He retired from professional football in 2010.

He returned to his former club Hollandia to play amateur football in the Topklasse. In 2013, he left Hollandia for lower league side De Valken, where he started playing football as a child.

== Club statistics ==
Club performance			League		Cup		Total	
Season	Club	League	Apps	Goals	Apps	Goals	Apps	Goals
Japan			League		Emperor's Cup		Total	
2003	Yokohama FC	J2 League	33	4				
2004	Yokohama FC	J2 League	40	8				
Total			73	12				

== After football ==
After retiring as a player, Boots became an accountant.
