= Manazuru Peninsula =

Peninsula in Japan

Coordinates: 35°8′45.6″N 139°8′53.5″E

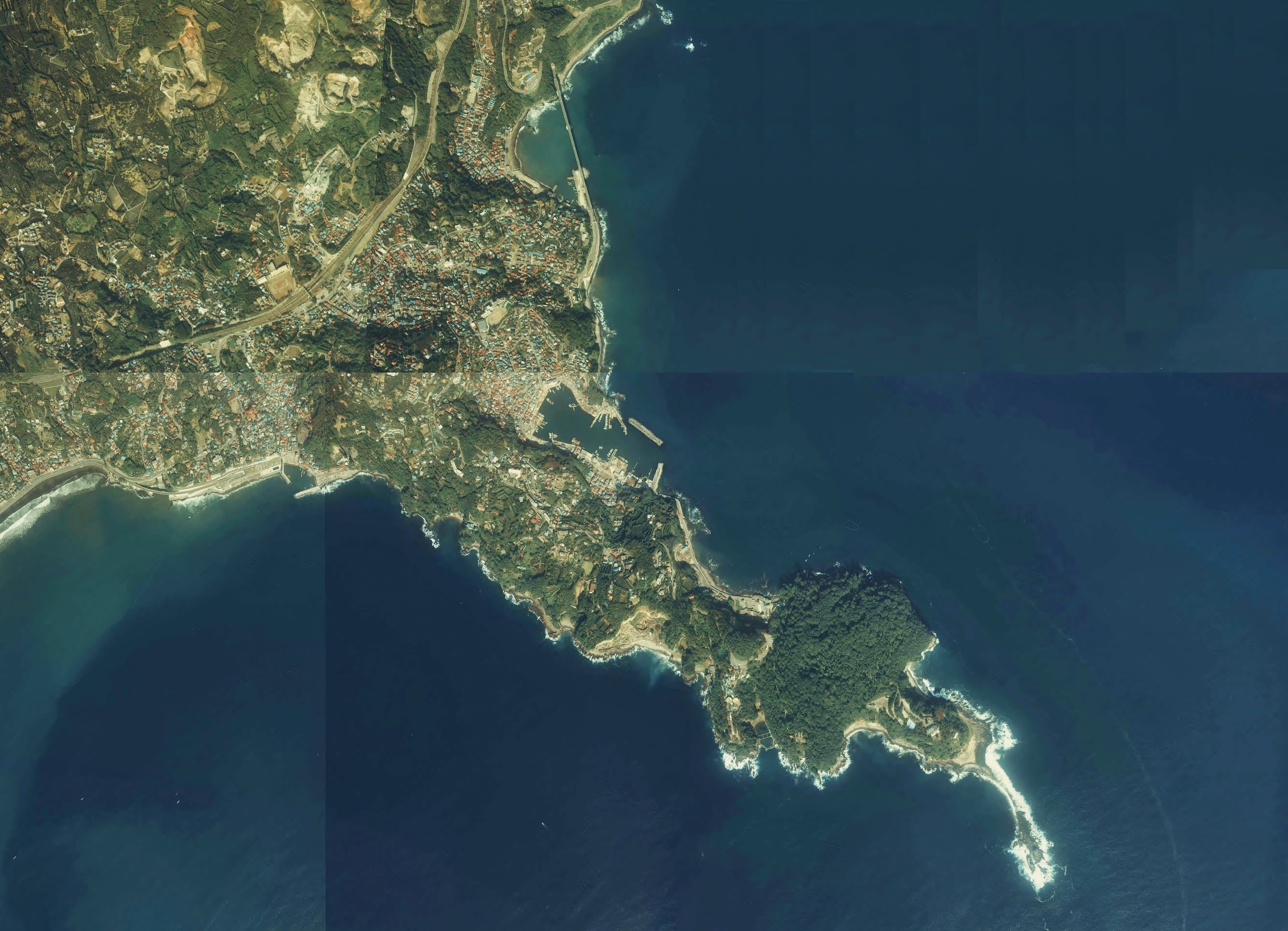
Aerial photo of the Manazuru Peninsula

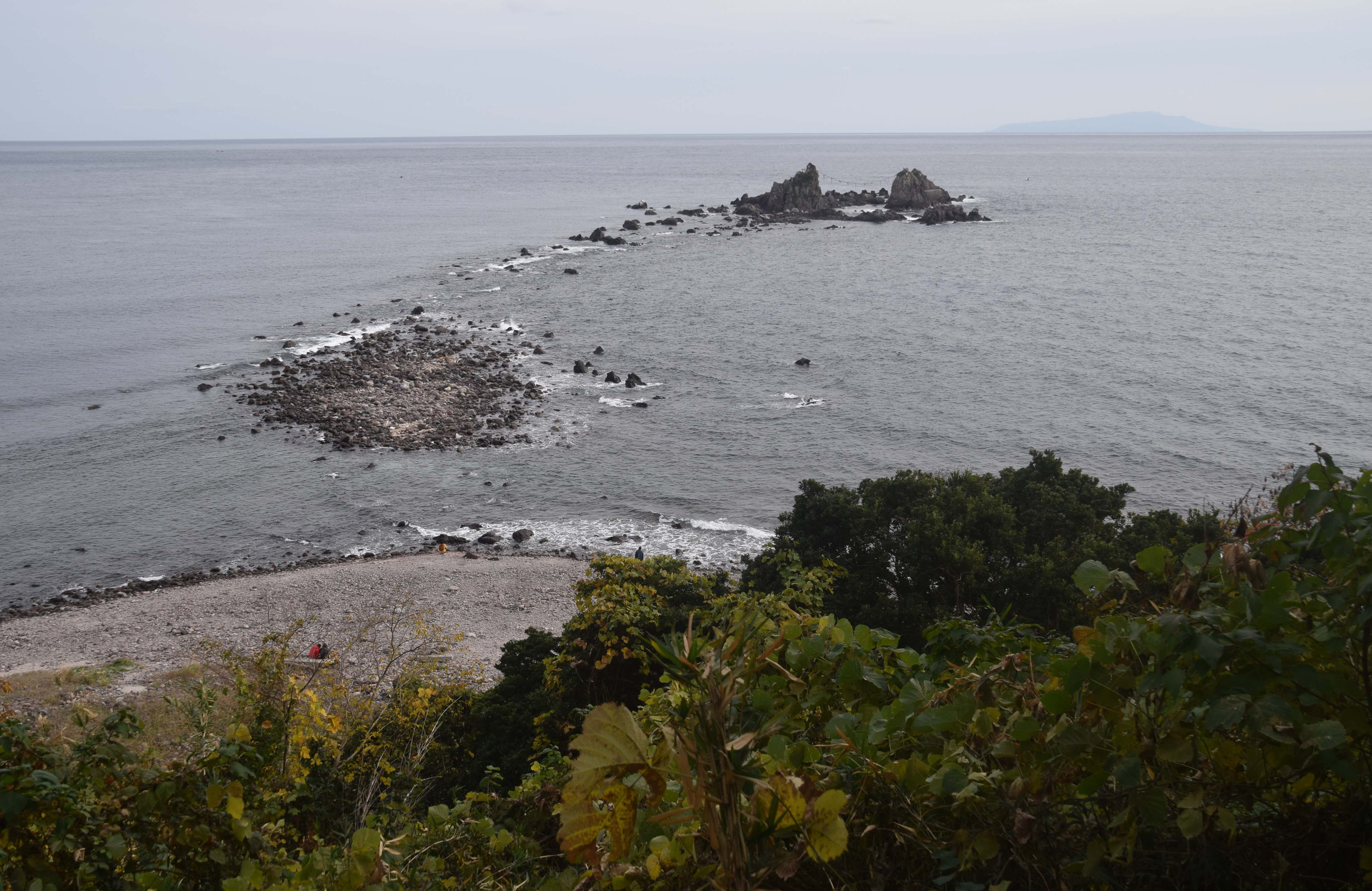
The Three Rocks, viewed from Cape Manazuru at the tip of the peninsula

Manazuru Peninsula (Japanese: 真鶴半島) is a relatively small peninsula, 7 km long and 1 km wide, in Manazuru, Kanagawa, Japan.

== In general ==
The Manazuru Peninsula is believed to have been formed about 230,000 years ago, together with Mount Maku and other mountains on the southern part of the Old outer rim of the Mount Hakone volcano.

Manazuru Hantō Prefectural Natural Park, located in the Manazuru Peninsula, offers the nature trails, leading to Cape Manazuru, the Three Rocks (三ツ石) and the Shiosai Promenade (潮騒プロムナード).

== See also ==
- Fuji-Hakone-Izu National Park
