= Jungo Kono =

Japanese footballer (born 1982)

Jungo Kono 河野 淳吾
Personal information
- Full name: Jungo Kono
- Date of birth: July 9, 1982 (age 44)
- Place of birth: Yugawara, Japan
- Height: 1.83 m (6 ft 0 in)
- Position: Defender

Team information
- Current team: s1=Shimizu Commercial High School

Senior career*
Years	Team	Apps	(Gls)
2001–2003	Sanfrecce Hiroshima	0	(0)
2003–2005	Yokohama FC	59	(3)
2006	Mito HollyHock	40	(2)
2007–2008	Tokushima Vortis	22	(1)
Total		121	(6)
- * Club domestic league appearances and goals

Jungo Kono (河野 淳吾, Kono Jungo; born July 9, 1982) is a former Japanese football player.

== Playing career ==
Kono was born in Yugawara, Kanagawa on July 9, 1982. After graduating from Shimizu Commercial High School, he joined J1 League club Sanfrecce Hiroshima in 2001. He played 2 matches as substitute defender in 2002 J.League Cup. However he could only play these 2 matches until June 2003. In June 2003, he moved to J2 League club Yokohama FC. He became a regular center back soon. Although his opportunity to play decreased from 2004, he played many matches. In 2006, he moved to Mito HollyHock. He played as regular center back. In 2007, he moved to Tokushima Vortis. Although he played as regular center back, he could not play at all in the match for injury from June. Although he played as substitute player last 2 matches in 2008 season, he retired end of 2008 season.

== Career statistics ==
Appearances and goals by club, season and competition
Club	Season	League			Emperor's Cup		J.League Cup		Total	
Club	Season	Division	Apps	Goals	Apps	Goals	Apps	Goals	Apps	Goals
Sanfrecce Hiroshima	2001	J1 League	0	0	0	0	0	0	0	0
Sanfrecce Hiroshima	2002	J1 League	0	0	0	0	2	0	2	0
Sanfrecce Hiroshima	2003	J2 League	0	0	0	0	—		0	0
Yokohama FC	2003	J2 League	22	1	3	0	—		25	1
Yokohama FC	2004	J2 League	18	0	2	0	—		20	0
Yokohama FC	2005	J2 League	19	2	0	0	—		19	2
Mito HollyHock	2006	J2 League	40	2	0	0	—		40	2
Tokushima Vortis	2007	J2 League	20	1	0	0	—		20	1
Tokushima Vortis	2008	J2 League	2	0	0	0	—		2	0
Career total			121	6	5	0	2	0	128	6
