= Michiharu Sugimoto =

Japanese footballer

Michiharu Sugimoto 杉本 倫治
Personal information
- Full name: Michiharu Sugimoto
- Date of birth: June 17, 1981 (age 45)
- Place of birth: Tenri, Nara, Japan
- Height: 1.81 m (5 ft 11 1/2 in)
- Position: Midfielder

Youth career
- 1997–1999: Unebi High School

Senior career*
Years	Team	Apps	(Gls)
2000–2003	Cerezo Osaka	16	(3)
2003	Ventforet Kofu	3	(0)
2004–2005	Yokohama FC	28	(0)
Total		47	(3)
Medal record
Cerezo Osaka
Runner-up	Emperor's Cup	2001
Runner-up	Emperor's Cup	2003
- * Club domestic league appearances and goals

Michiharu Sugimoto (杉本 倫治, Sugimoto Michiharu; born June 17, 1981) is a former Japanese football player.

== Playing career ==
Sugimoto was born in Tenri on June 17, 1981. After graduating from high school, he joined J1 League club Cerezo Osaka in 2000. He played several matches as forward and left midfielder from first season. However the club was relegated to J2 League from 2002 and he could hardly play in the match in 2002. Although the club returned to J1 in a year, he could not play at all in the match in 2003. In August 2003, he moved to J2 club Ventforet Kofu. However he could hardly play in the match. In 2004, he moved to J2 club Yokohama FC. He played many matches as left midfielder in 2004. However he could not play at all in the match in 2005 and retired end of 2005 season.

== Club statistics ==
Club performance			League		Cup		League Cup		Total	
Season	Club	League	Apps	Goals	Apps	Goals	Apps	Goals	Apps	Goals
Japan			League		Emperor's Cup		J.League Cup		Total	
2000	Cerezo Osaka	J1 League	7	2	3	1	0	0	10	3
2001	Cerezo Osaka	J1 League	7	1	5	1	0	0	12	2
2002	Cerezo Osaka	J2 League	2	0	0	0	-		2	0
2003	Cerezo Osaka	J1 League	0	0	0	0	0	0	0	0
2003	Ventforet Kofu	J2 League	3	0	0	0	-		3	0
2004	Yokohama FC	J2 League	28	0	1	0	-		29	0
2005	Yokohama FC	J2 League	0	0	0	0	-		0	0
Total			47	3	9	2	0	0	56	5
