= Manazuru =

Manazuru 真鶴町
- Town
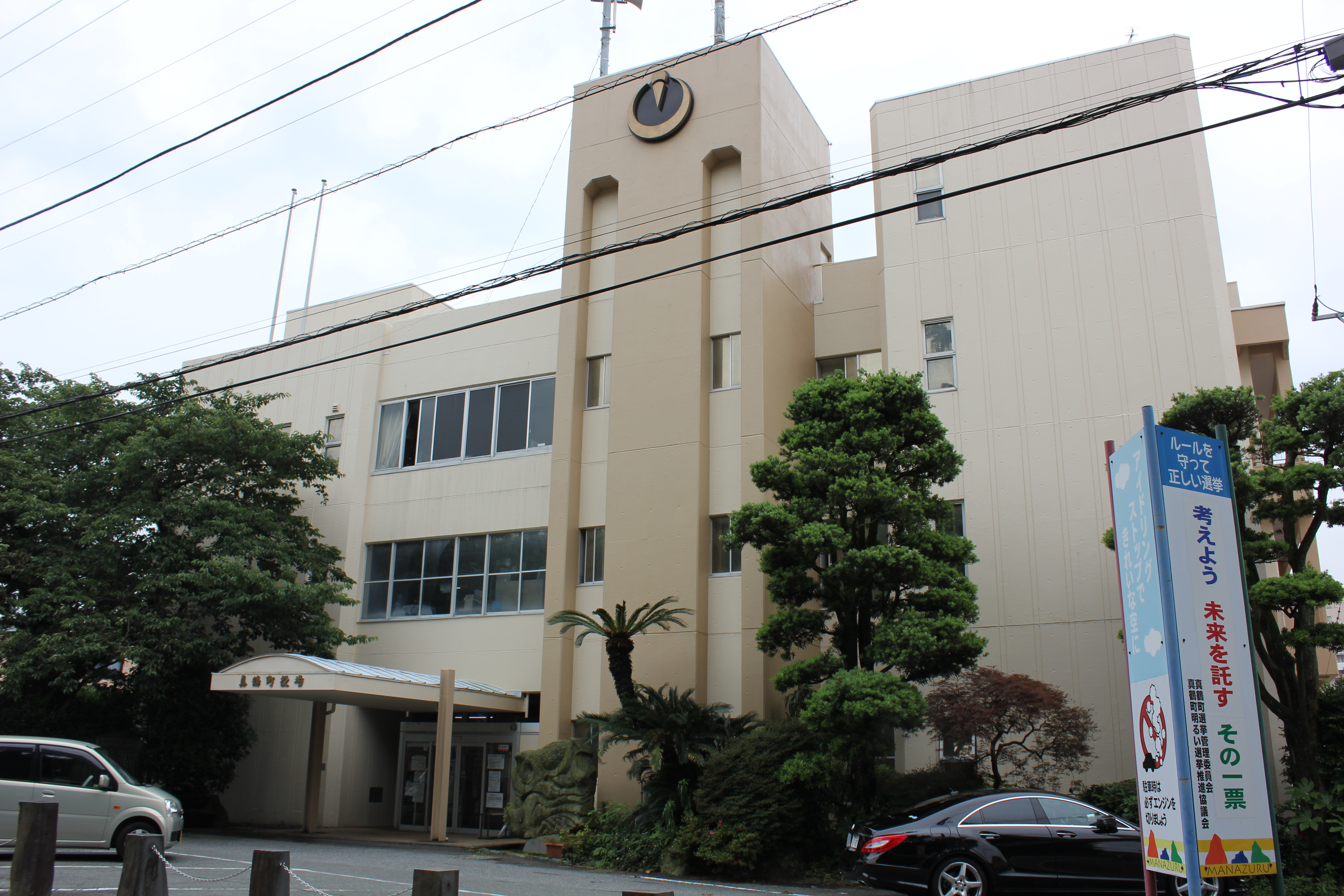
- Manazuru Town Hall

- Flag Seal

- Location of Manazuru in Kanagawa Prefecture

- Coordinates: 35°09′N 139°08′E
- Country: Japan
- Region: Kantō
- Prefecture: Kanagawa
- District: Ashigarashimo

Area
  - Total: 7.02 km^{2} (2.71 sq mi)

Population (May 1, 2021)
  - Total: 7,061
  - Density: 1,010/km^{2} (2,610/sq mi)
- Time zone: UTC+9 (Japan Standard Time)
- Tree: Cinnamomum camphora
- Flower: Crinum asiaticum
- Bird: Blue Rock-thrush
- Phone number: 0465-68-1131
- Address: 244-1 Iwa, Manazuru-machi, Ashigarashimo-gun, Kanagawa-ken; 259-0202
- Website: Official website

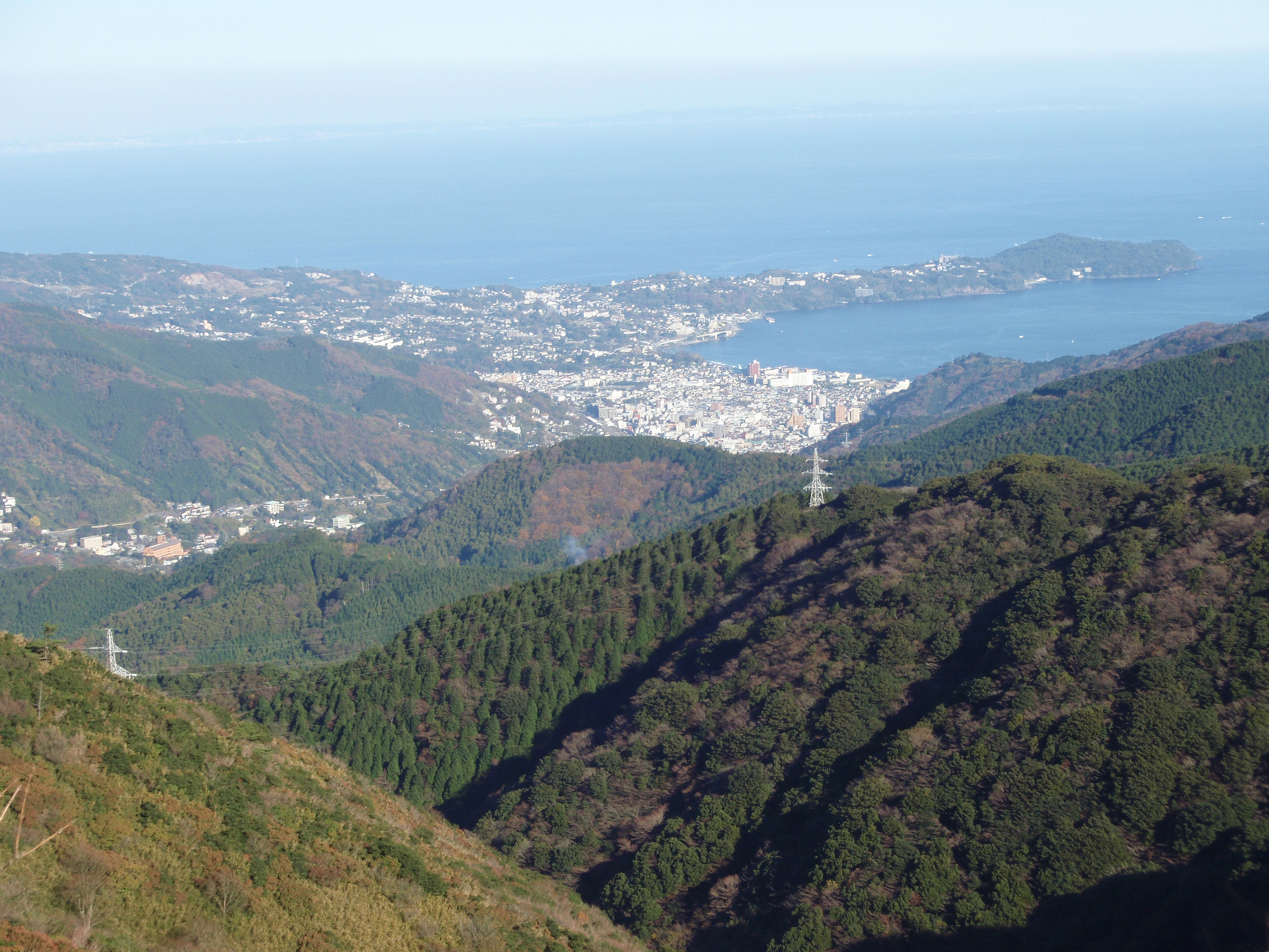
Manazuru peninsula

Manazuru (真鶴町, Manazuru-machi) is a town located in Kanagawa Prefecture, Japan. As of 1 June 2022, the town had an estimated population of 6,949 and a population density of 1000 persons per km^{2}. The total area of the town is 7.02 square kilometres (2.71 sq mi).

== Geography ==
Located in the southeast of Mount Hakone, the consists of the small Manazuru Peninsula, which extends into Sagami Bay from the southeast to the northwest, sandwiched between Odawara City in the north and Yugawara Town in the south. The Manazuru Peninsula is a lava plateau with a steep coast and The town area is generally rugged with few flat areas. The urban area is at the base of the peninsula, with Manazuru Station to the northwest, Iwa Fishing Port and Iwo Beach to the east, and Manazuru Port to the southeast. There are many quarries in the mountains north of the city. Mandarin oranges are cultivated in the hills along the northern coast. The northwestern part of the town is part of a mountainous area that extends to the outer ring of the Hakone volcano. The town is within the Manazuru Hantō Prefectural Natural Park.

=== Surrounding municipalities ===
Kanagawa Prefecture

- Odawara
- Yugawara

=== Climate ===
Manazuru has a humid subtropical climate (Köppen Cfa) characterized by warm summers and cool winters with light to no snowfall. The average annual temperature in Manazuru is 14.2 °C. The average annual rainfall is 2144 mm with September as the wettest month. The temperatures are highest on average in August, at around 24.7 °C, and lowest in January, at around 4.2 °C.

== Demographics ==
Per Japanese census data, the population of Manazuru peaked around the year 1970 and has declined since.

Historical population
Year	Pop.	±%
1920	5,097	—
1930	5,511	+8.1%
1940	6,169	+11.9%
1950	8,657	+40.3%
1960	9,141	+5.6%
1970	10,284	+12.5%
1980	9,968	−3.1%
1990	9,588	−3.8%
2000	9,075	−5.4%
2010	8,212	−9.5%
2020	6,722	−18.1%

== History ==
As with the rest of Ashigarashimo District, the area now comprising modern Manazuru was part of Sagami Province under control of the later Hōjō clan in the Sengoku period, and part of Odawara Domain during the Edo period. During this time, it was known for high quality stones for construction. After the Meiji Restoration, Manazuru was established as a village in 1889 with the establishment of the modern municipalities system. On October 1, 1927, Manazuru village was elevated to town status. On September 30, 1956, neighboring Iwa village was merged into Manazuru. A proposal to merge Manazuru into neighboring Yugawara was overwhelmingly rejected by a citizen's referendum in 2005.

== Government ==
Manazuru has a mayor-council form of government with a directly elected mayor and a unicameral town council of 11 members. Manazuru, together with neighboring Yugawara, contributes one member to the Kanagawa Prefectural Assembly. In terms of national politics, the town is part of Kanagawa 16th district of the lower house of the Diet of Japan.

In November 2023, a mayoral candidate called "AI Mayer" hoped to be the first AI-powered officeholder in Japan. This candidacy was said to be supported by a group led by Michihito Matsuda.

== Economy ==
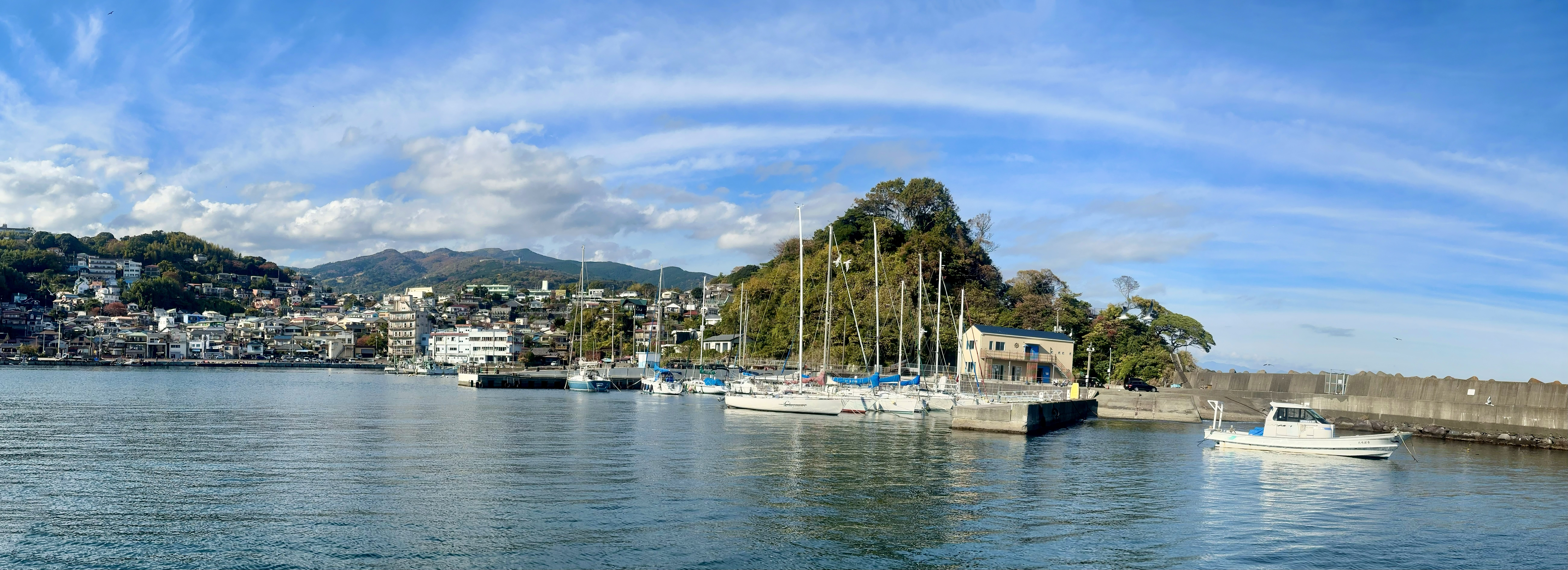
Manazuru Port

Traditionally, the industry characterizing Manazuru was the mining of Komatsu stone (ja) dating back to Middle Ages. The economy of Manazuru is now based on tourism, and as a summer resort area, promoting itself as the "Japanese Riviera", claiming to loosely resembles the Mediterranean coast of France and Italy. The town also functions as a bedroom community for nearby Odawara. The hilly, stony peninsula is not suited for agriculture, but cultivation of mikan and commercial fishing also contribute to the local economy.

== Education ==
Manazuru has one public elementary school and one public middle school operated by the town government. The town does not have a high school.

== Transportation ==
=== Railway ===
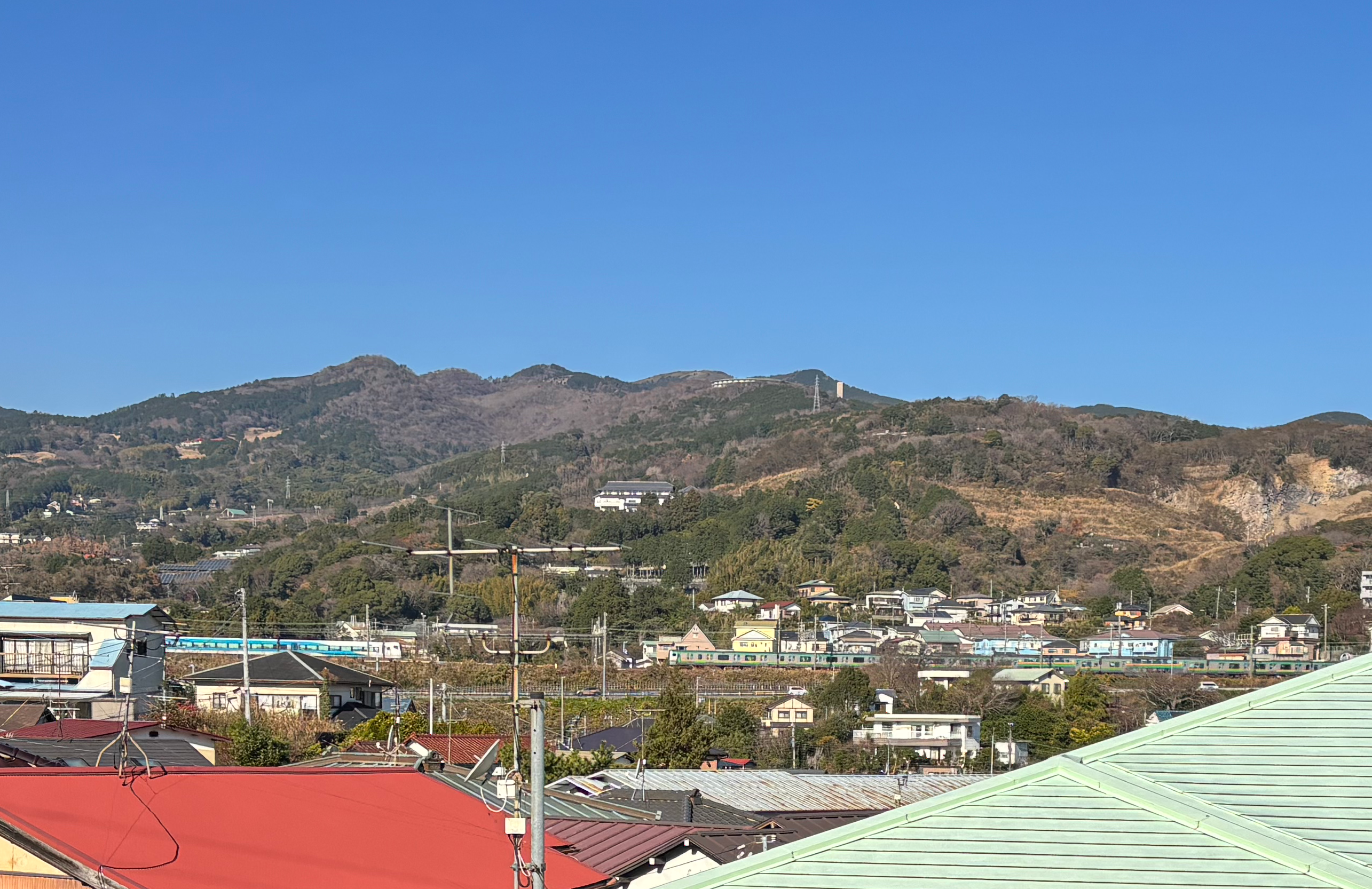
Trains running through Manazuru

JR East – Tōkaidō Main Line

- Manazuru

=== Highway ===
- National Route 135

== Area attractions ==
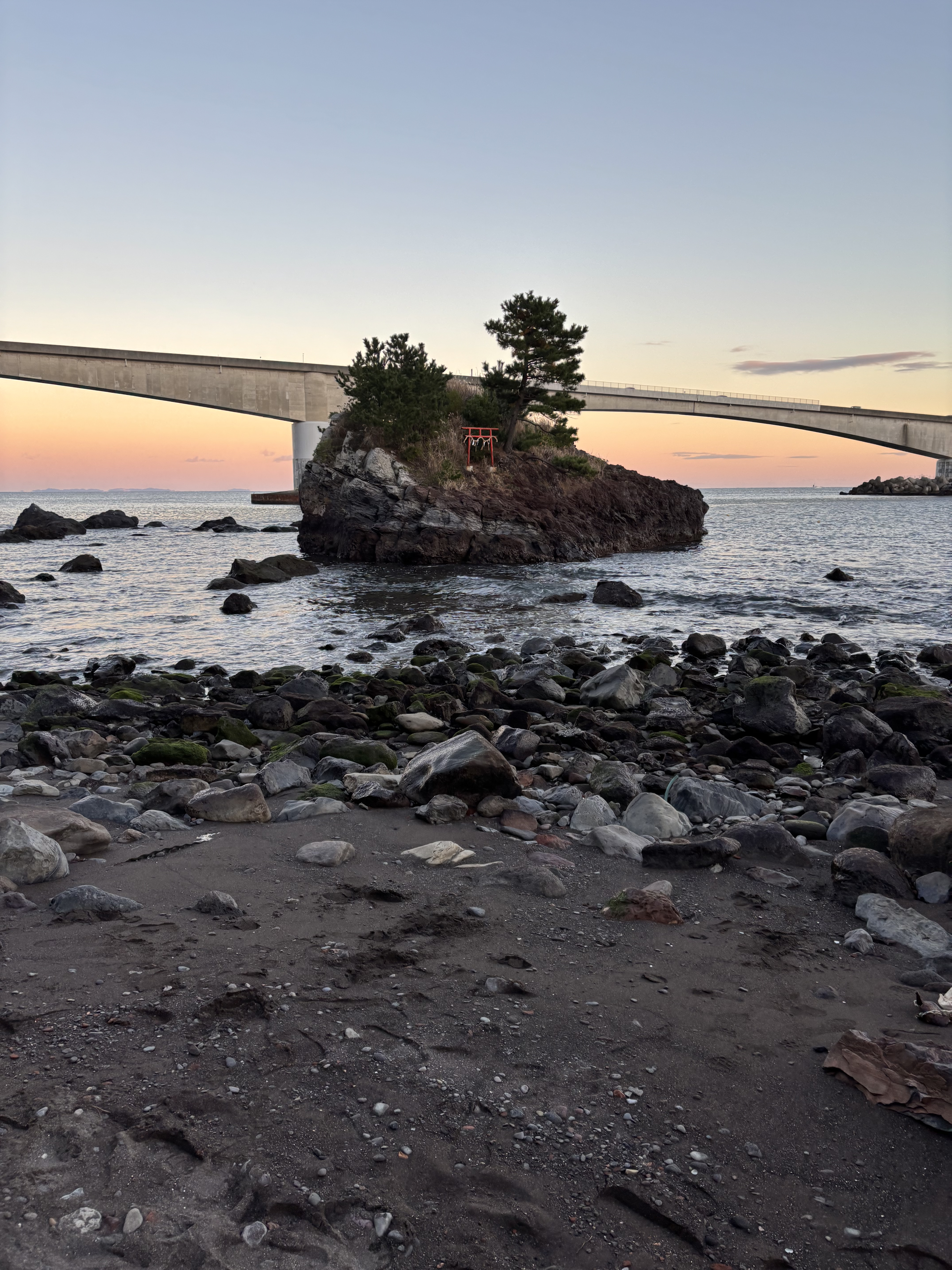
Shrine Island near Iwa Bridge at sunset

- Iwa Beach (ja)
- Dōsojin (ja)
- Ryumonji (ja)
- The monument of Stonemason's ancestors (ja)
- Manazuru Hantō Prefectural Natural Park
- Kibune jinja Shrine (ja)
  - Kibune Festival which is designated as an important intangible folk cultural asset designated as a country and is considered one of Japan's three major festivals. Held two days from 27 to 28 July.
- Nakagawa Kazumasa art Museum (ja)
- Kuroda Nagamasa memorial tower (ja)
- Shitodo-no-iwaya Hidden Cave (ja)
  - This historic site near Manazuru Port is associated with Minamoto no Yoritomo. After losing a battle with the Taira clan at Mt. Ishibasiyama in 1180, Minamoto no Yoritomo fled into the Fuji-Hakone-Izu National Park, stayed in this cave, then escaped to Awa (south of present-day Chiba).
- Odaiba memorial tower
- Manazuru Industrial vitalization Centre (Satoumi Base)(ja)
- Sakanaza
- Setomichi - The back streets of Manazuru
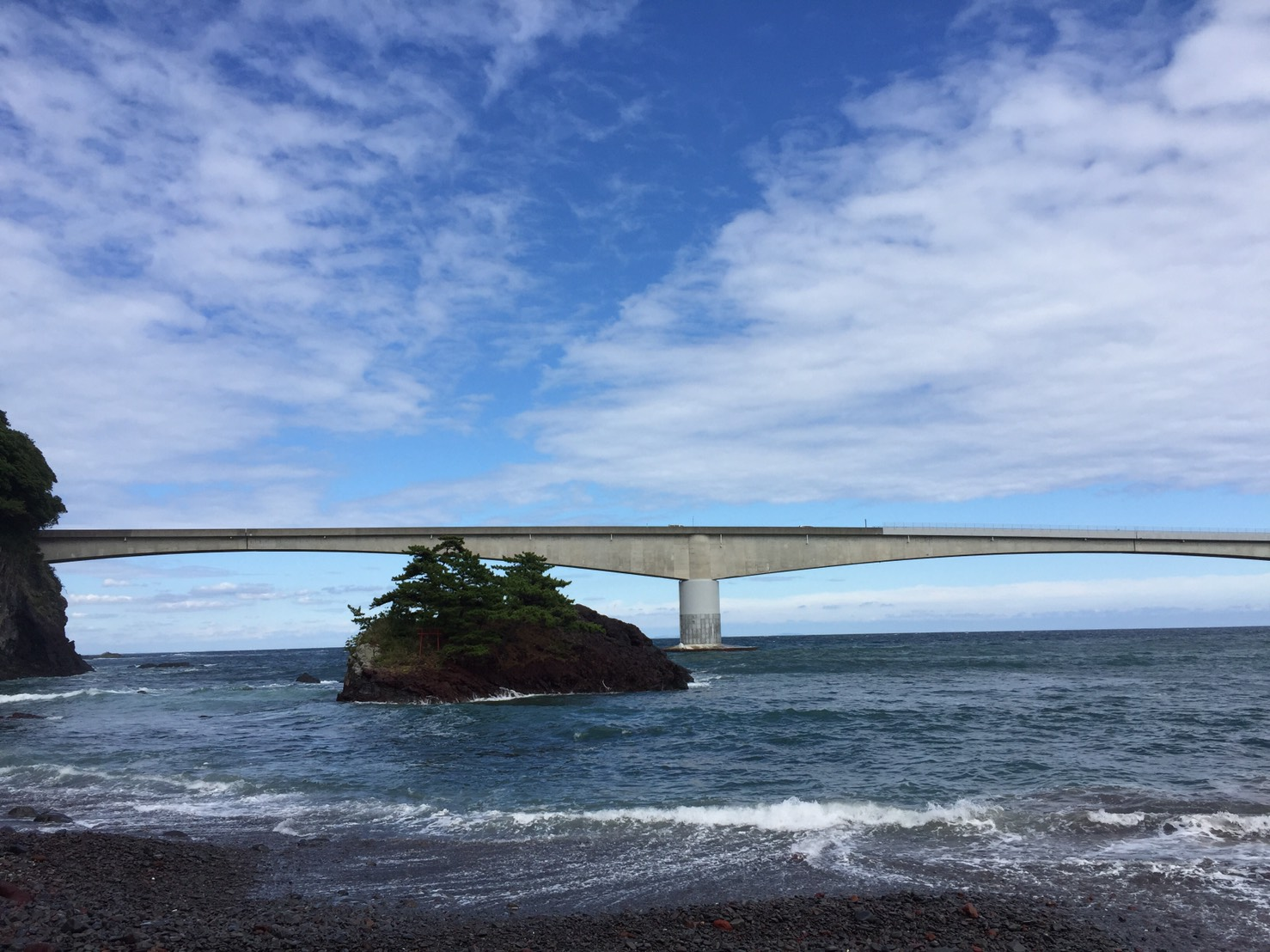
Iwa-bridge

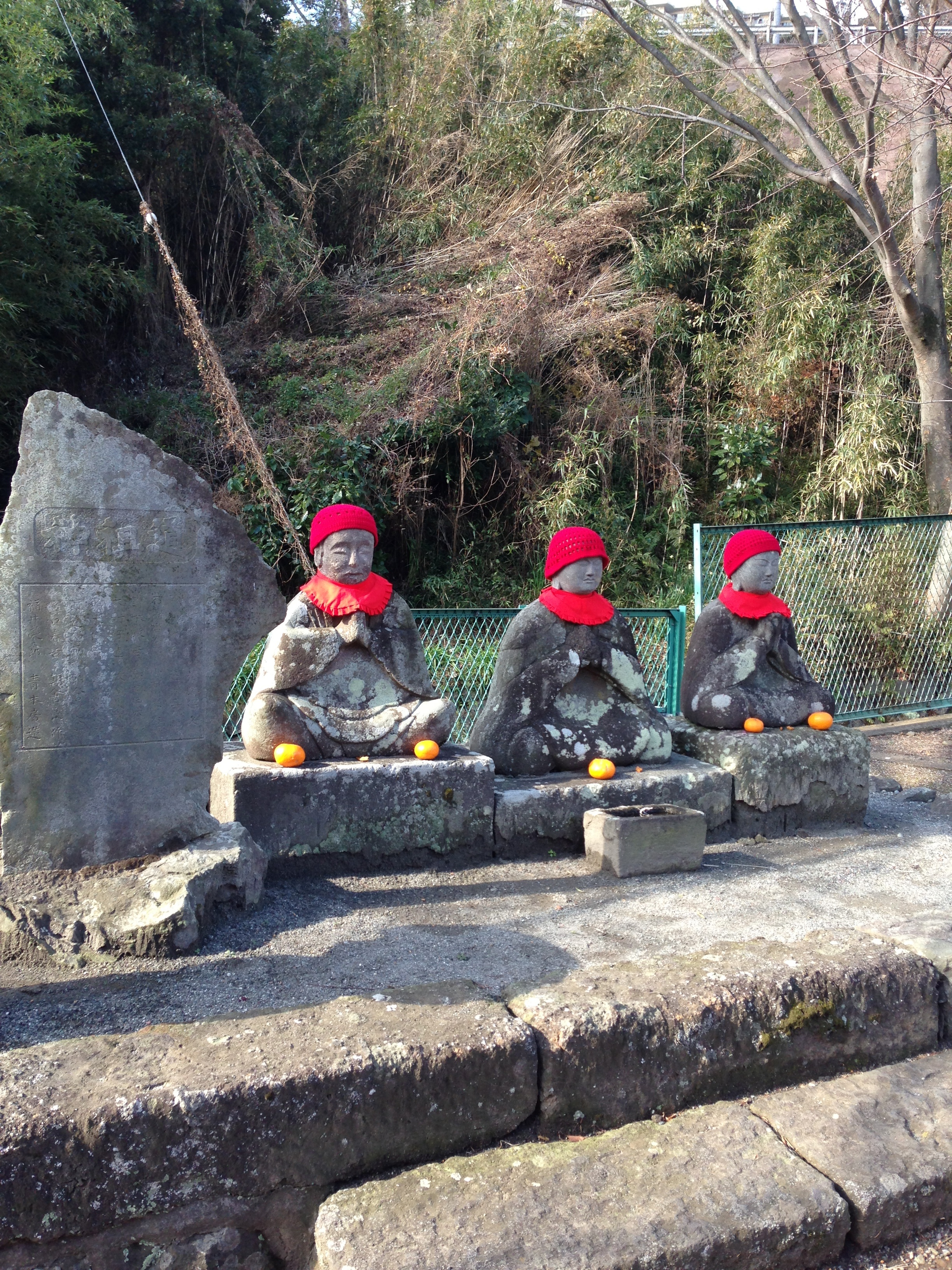
Dōsojin

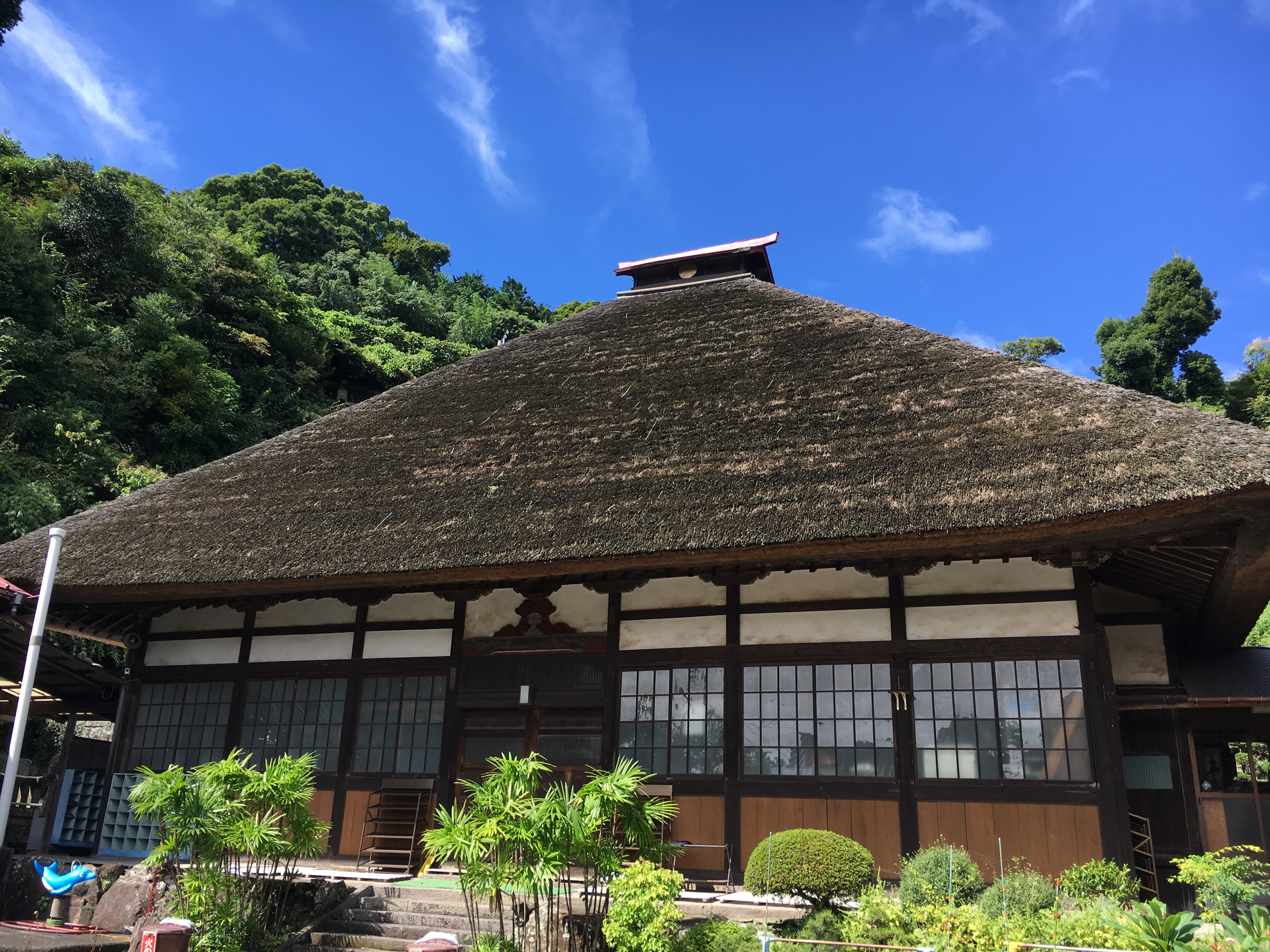
Ryumonji

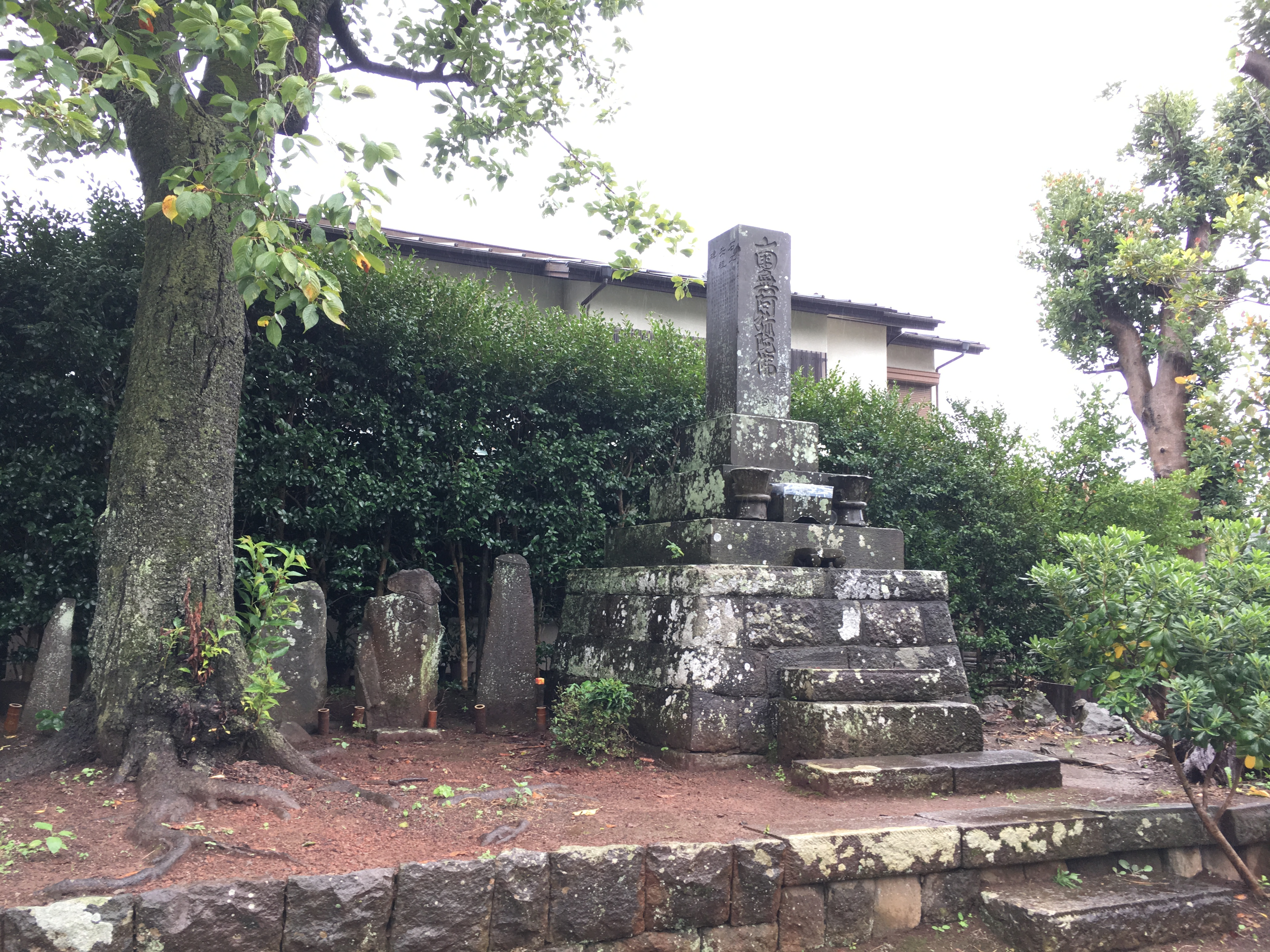
The monument of Maiden's ancestors

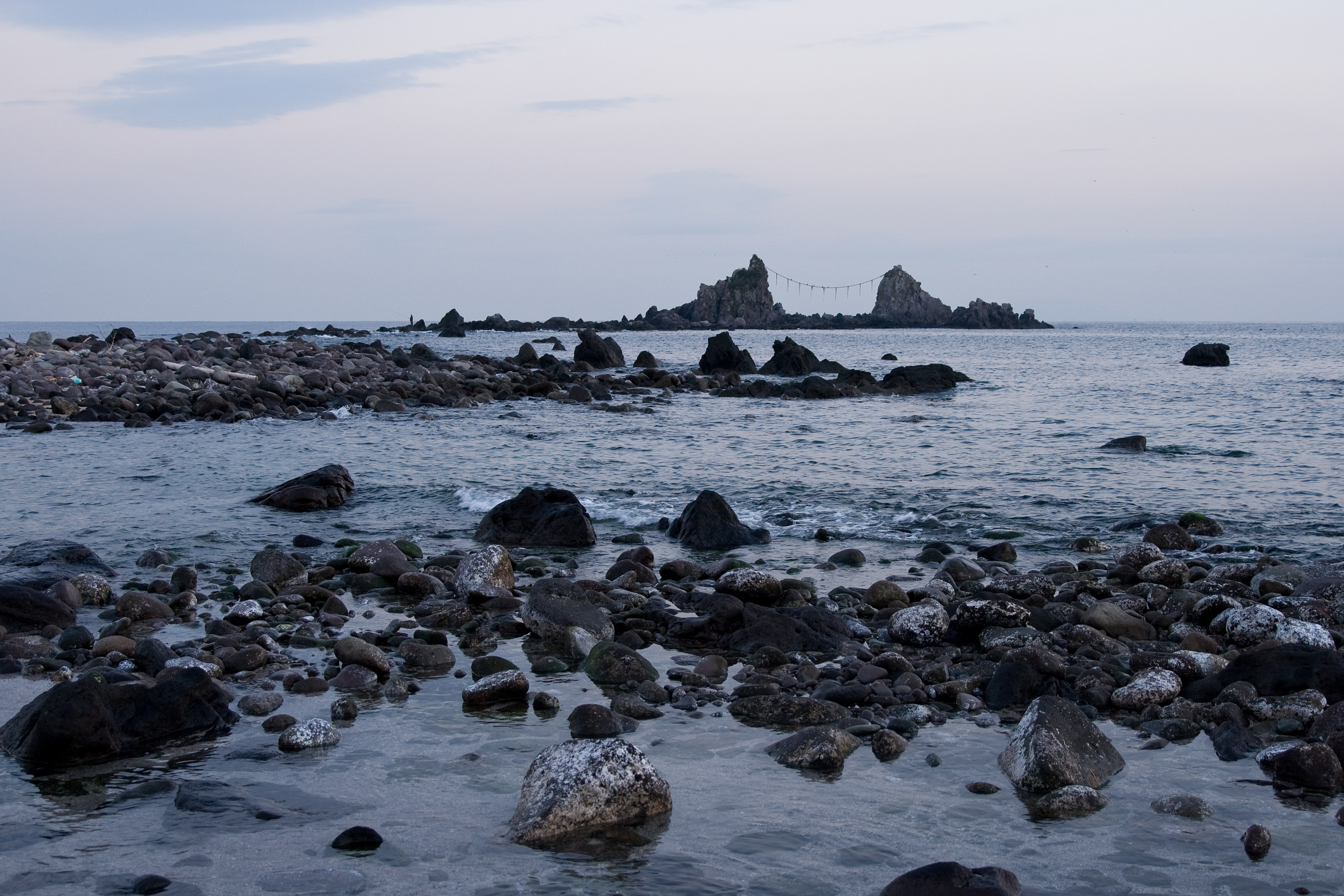
Manazuru Hantō Prefectural Natural Park

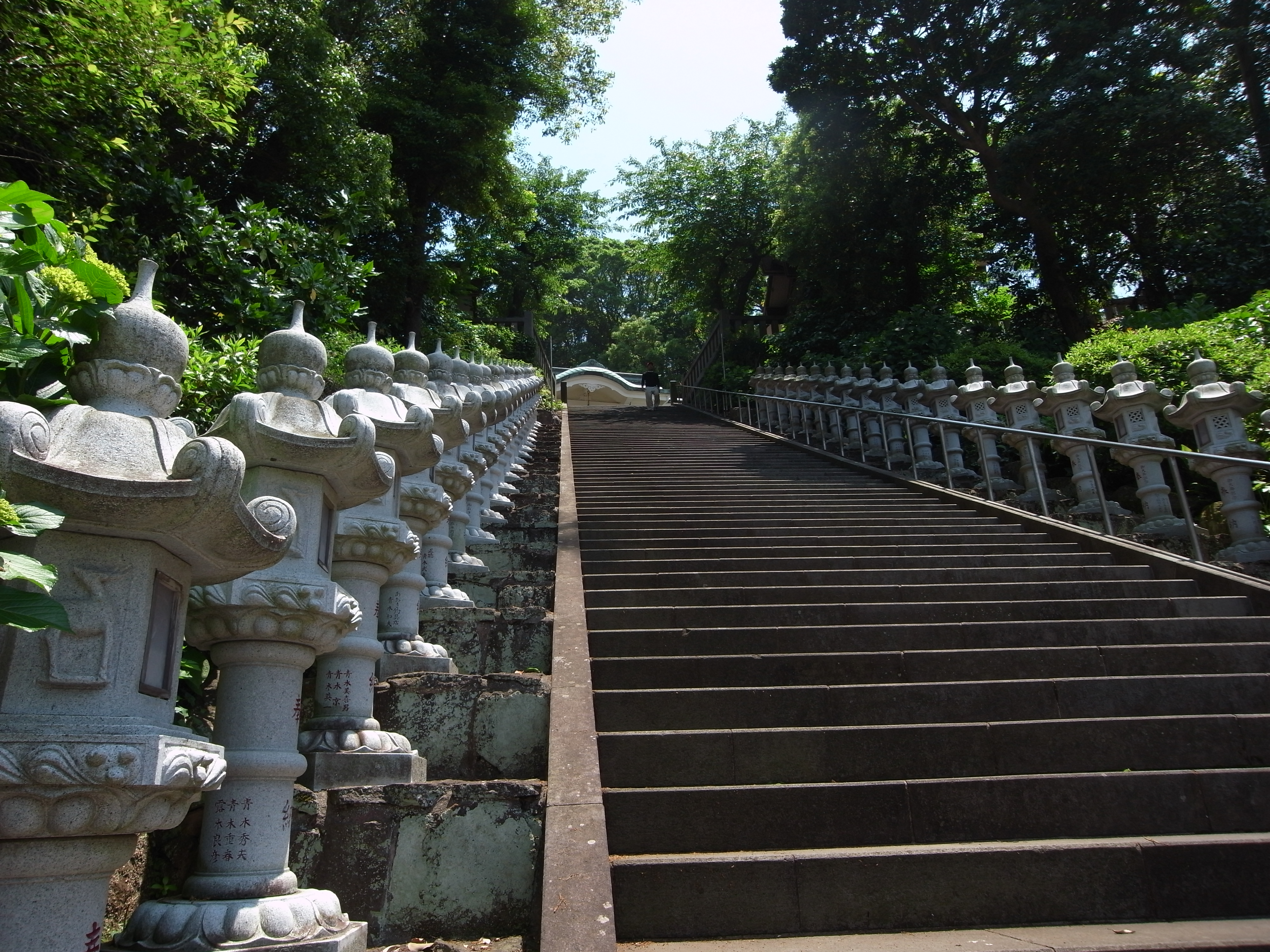
Kibune jinja Shrine

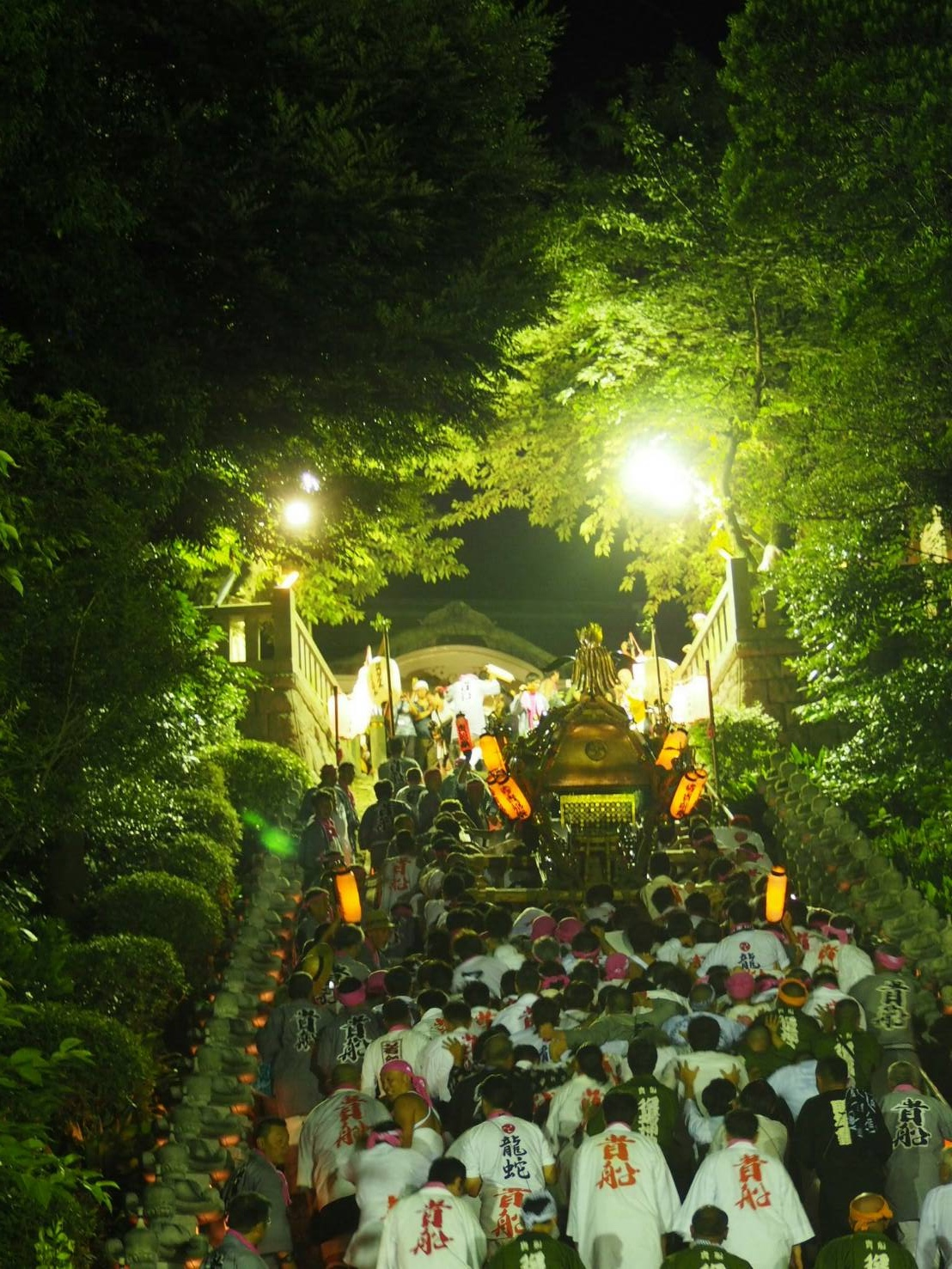
Kibune Festival
(Mikoshi)

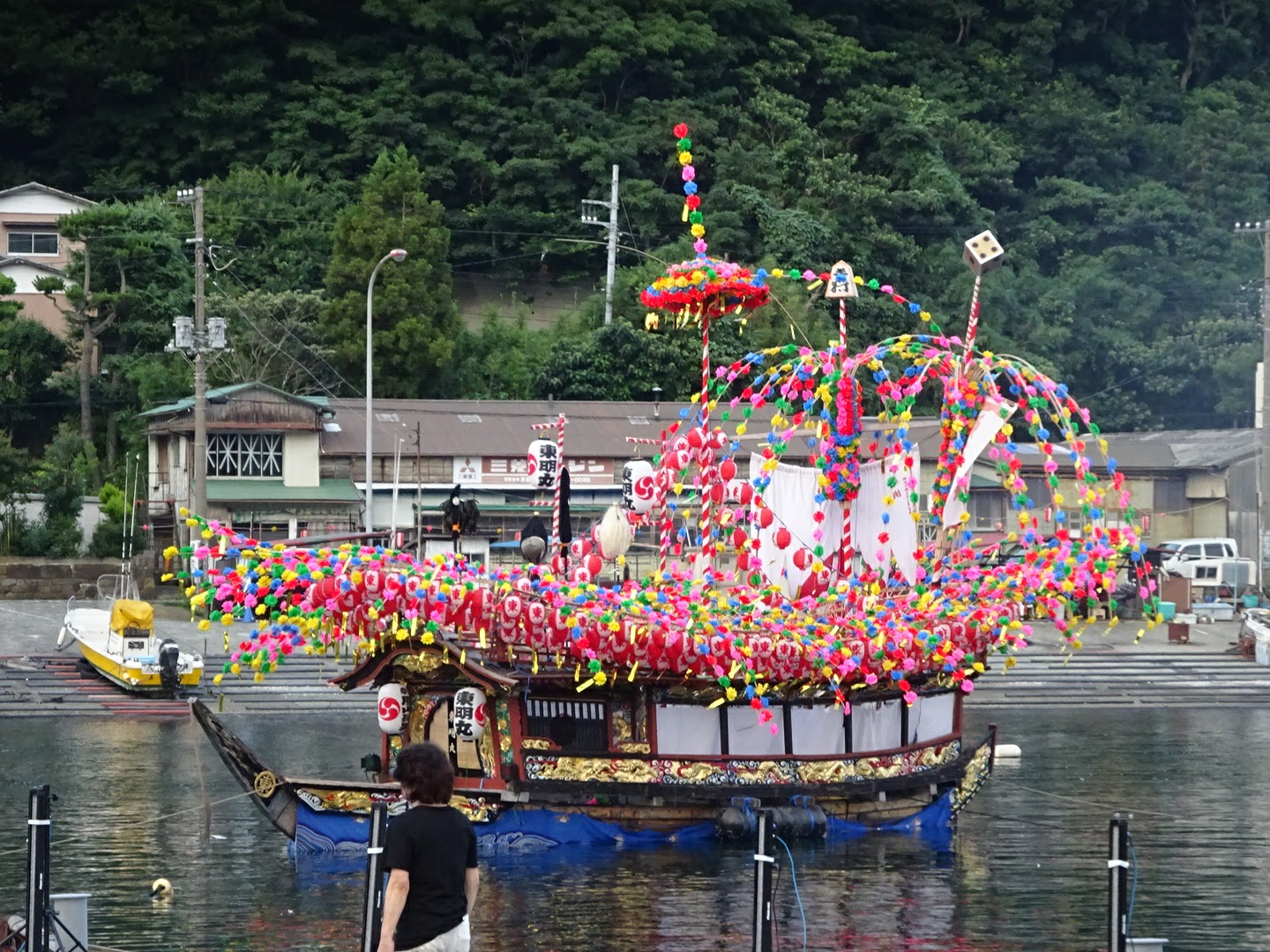
Kibune Festival
(Kobayabune)

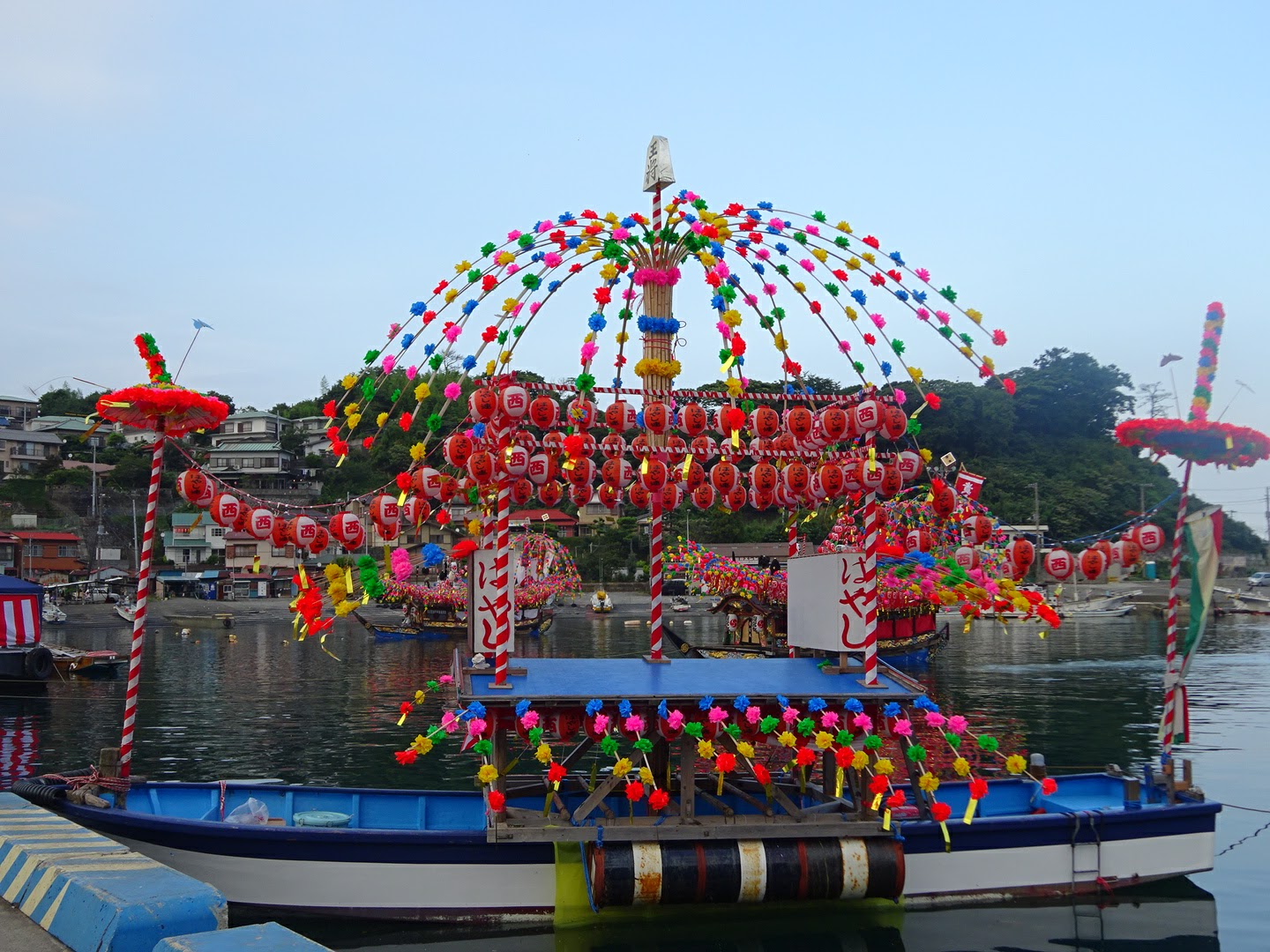
Kibune Festival
(Hayashibune)

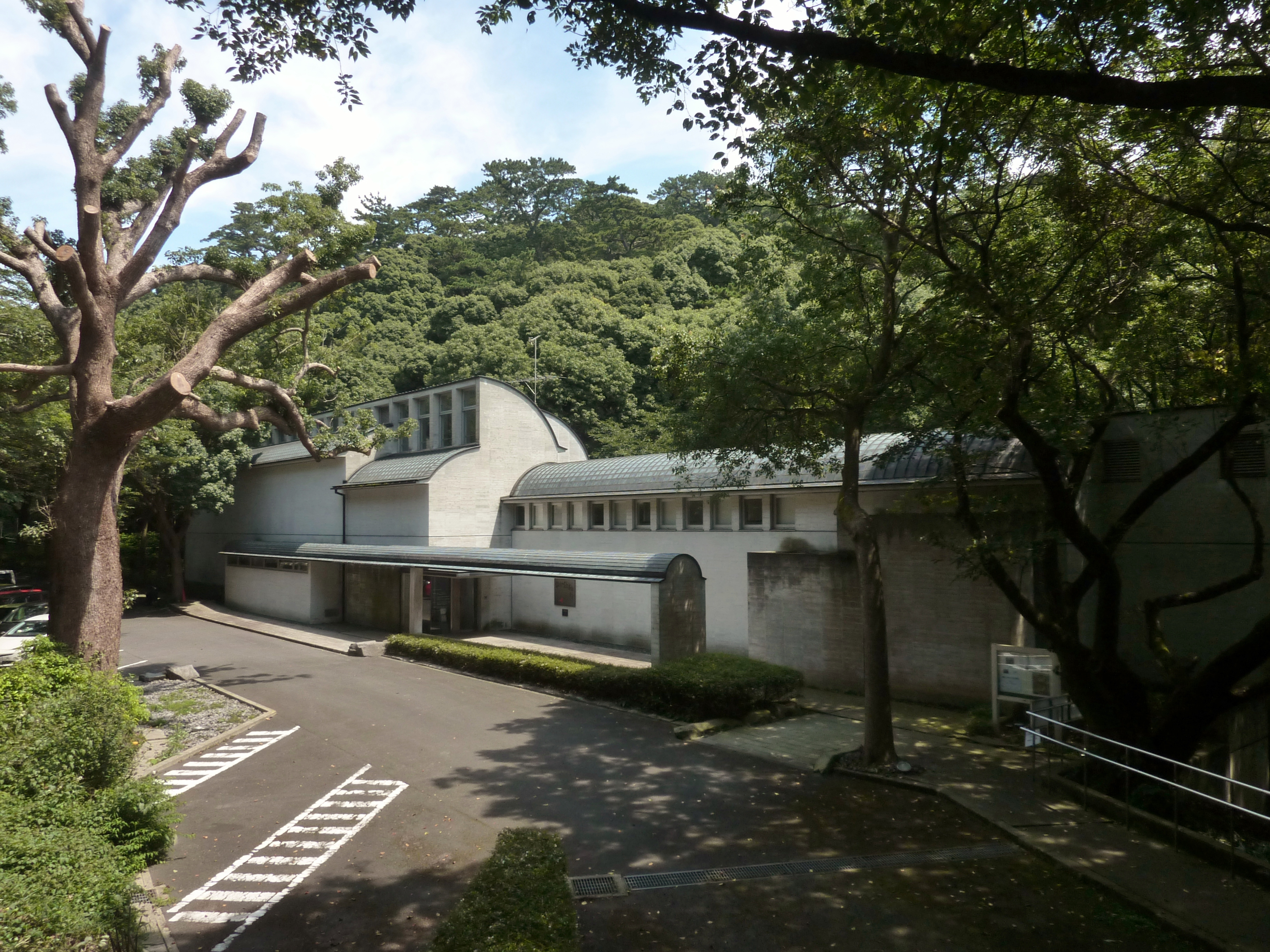
Nakagawa Kazumasa art Museum

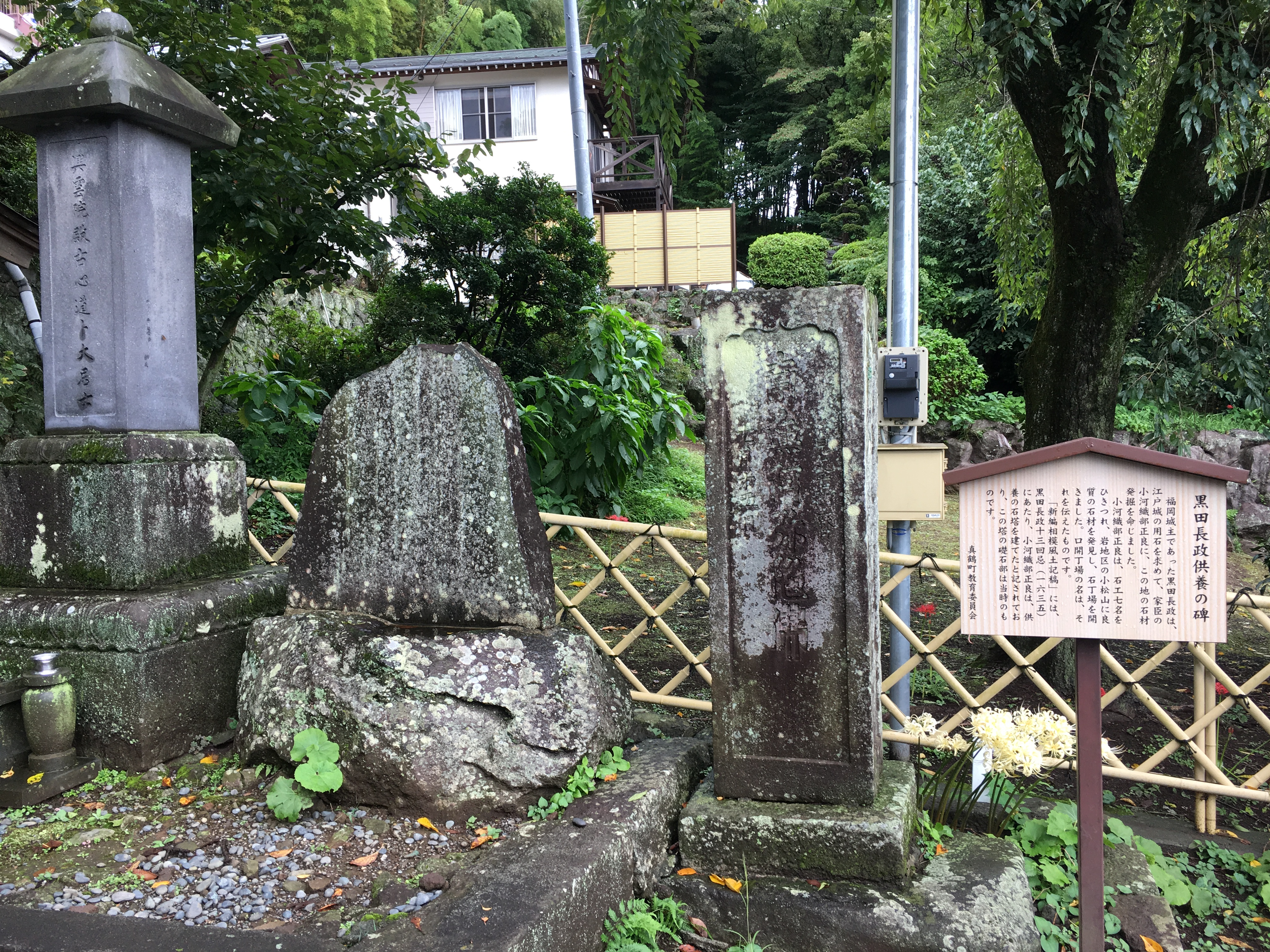
Kuroda Nagamasa memorial tower

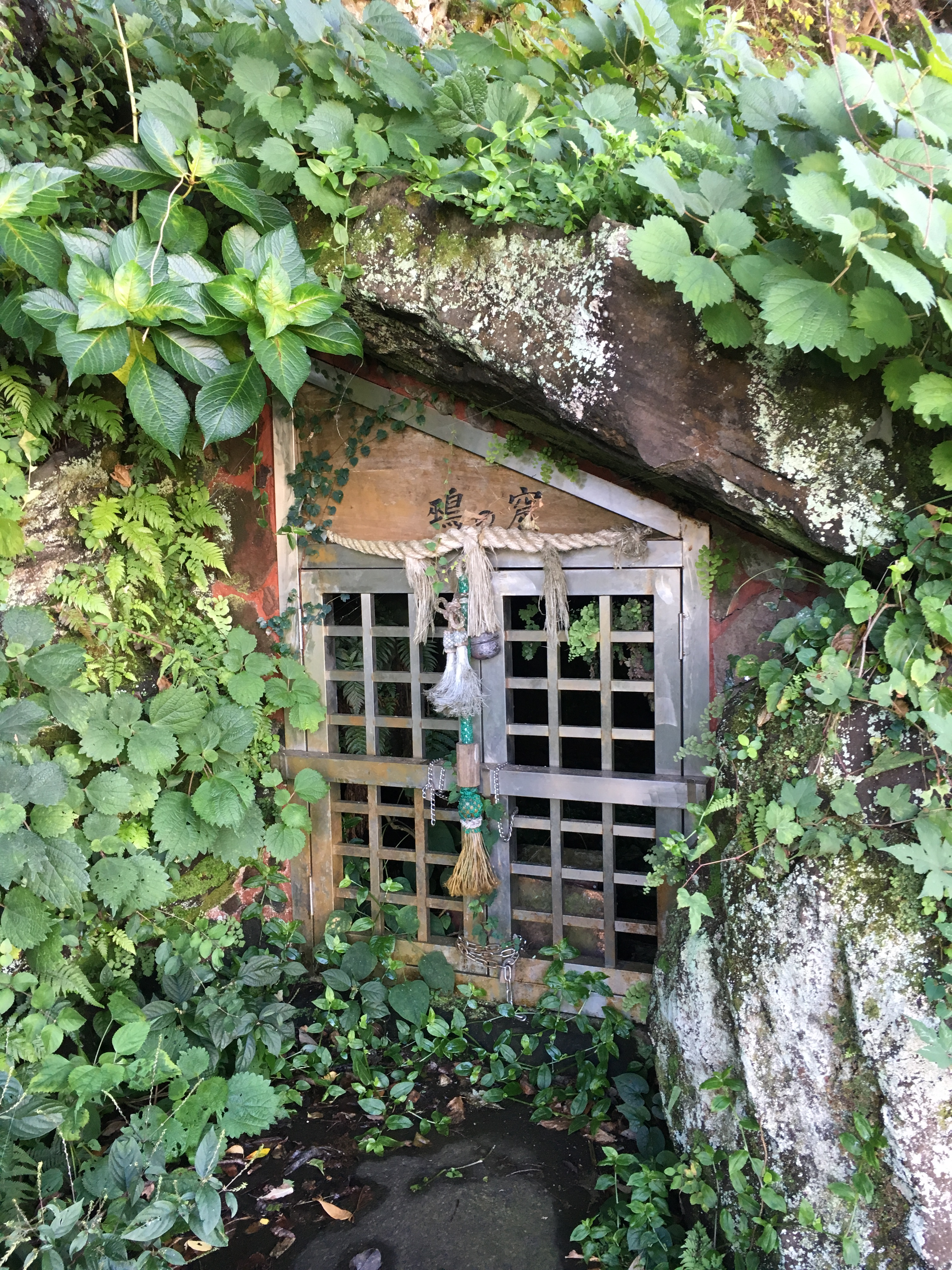
Shitodo-no-iwaya Hidden Cave

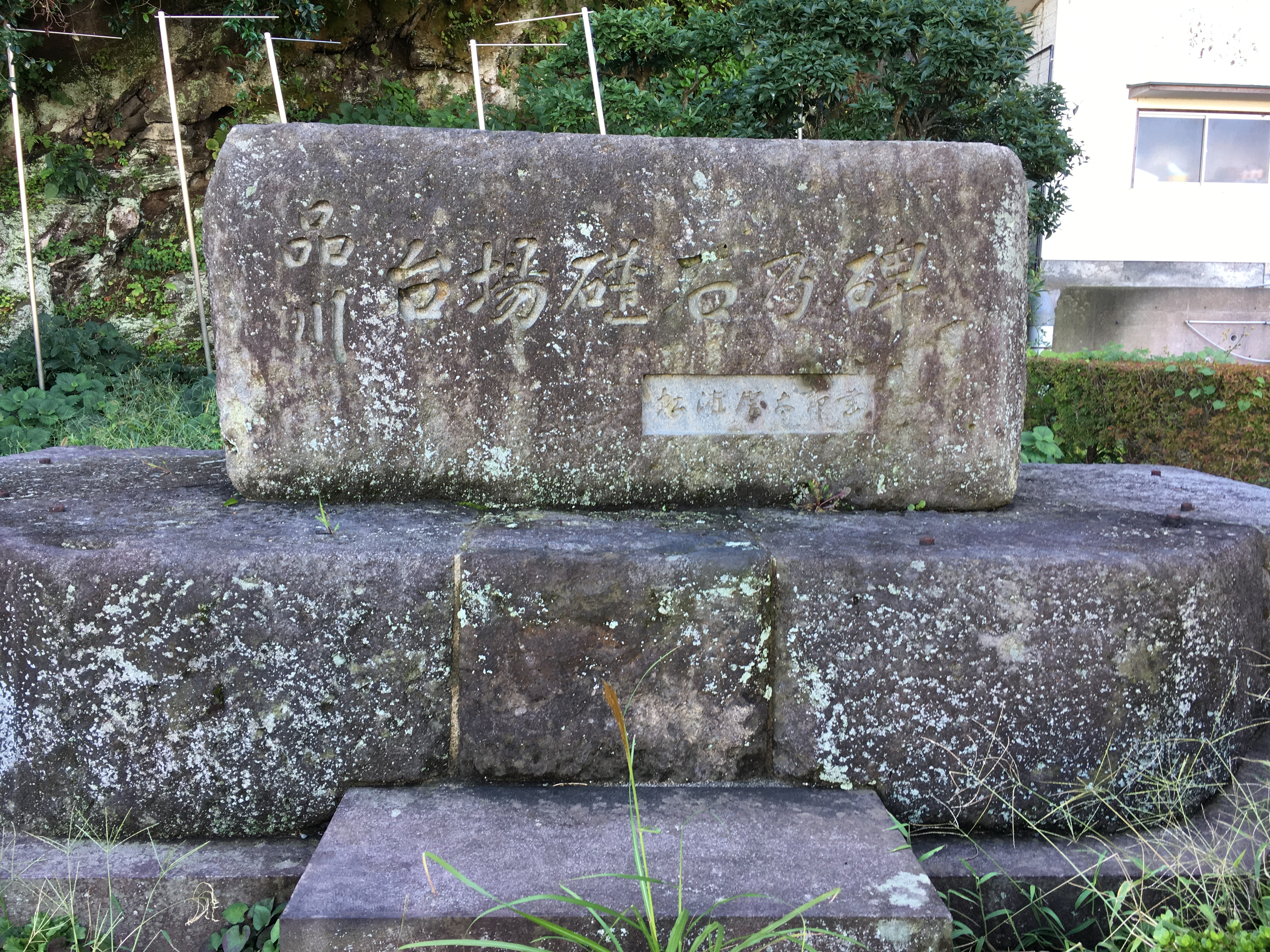
Odaiba memorial tower

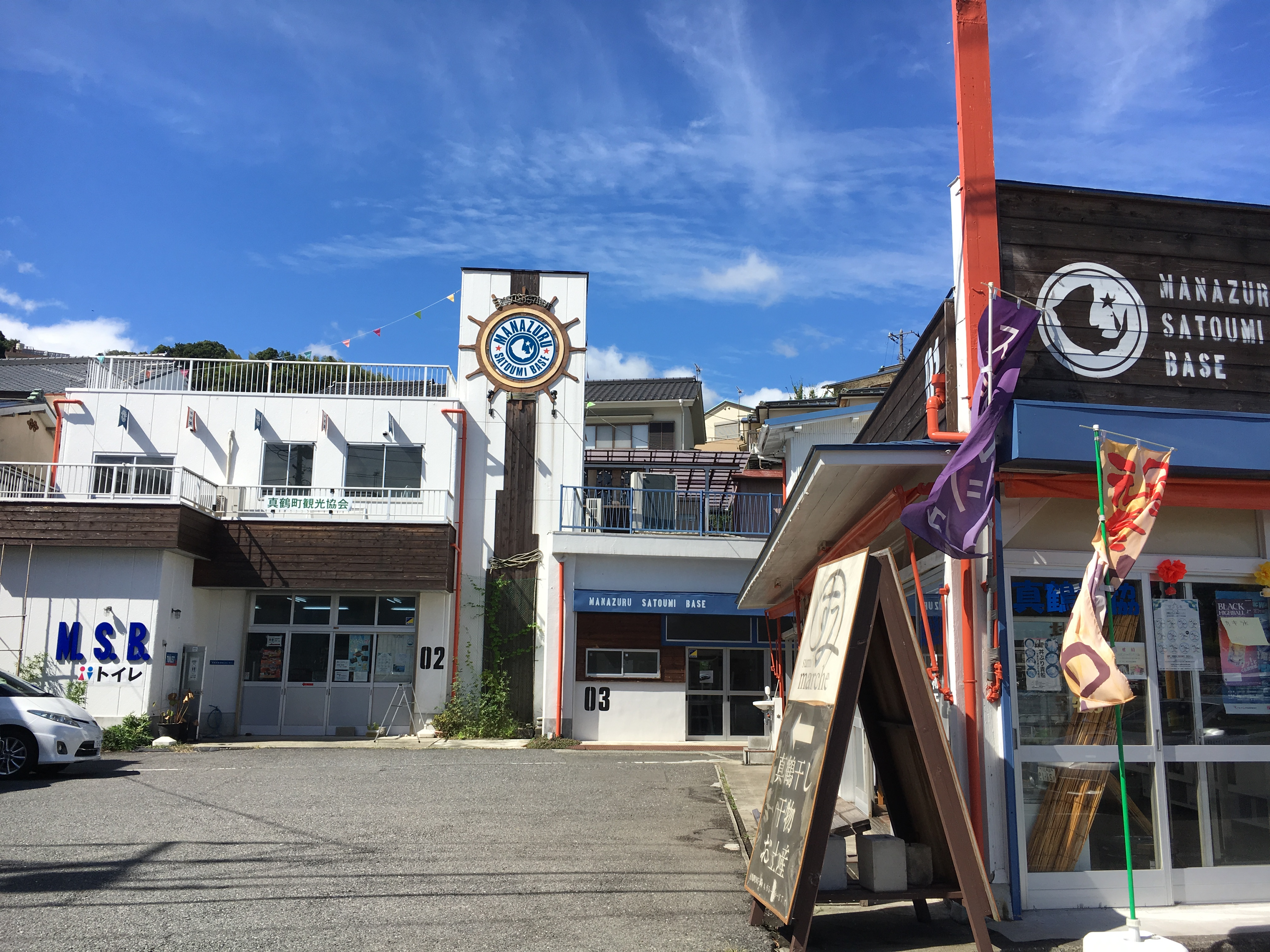
Manazuru Industrial vitalization Centre (Satoumi Base)

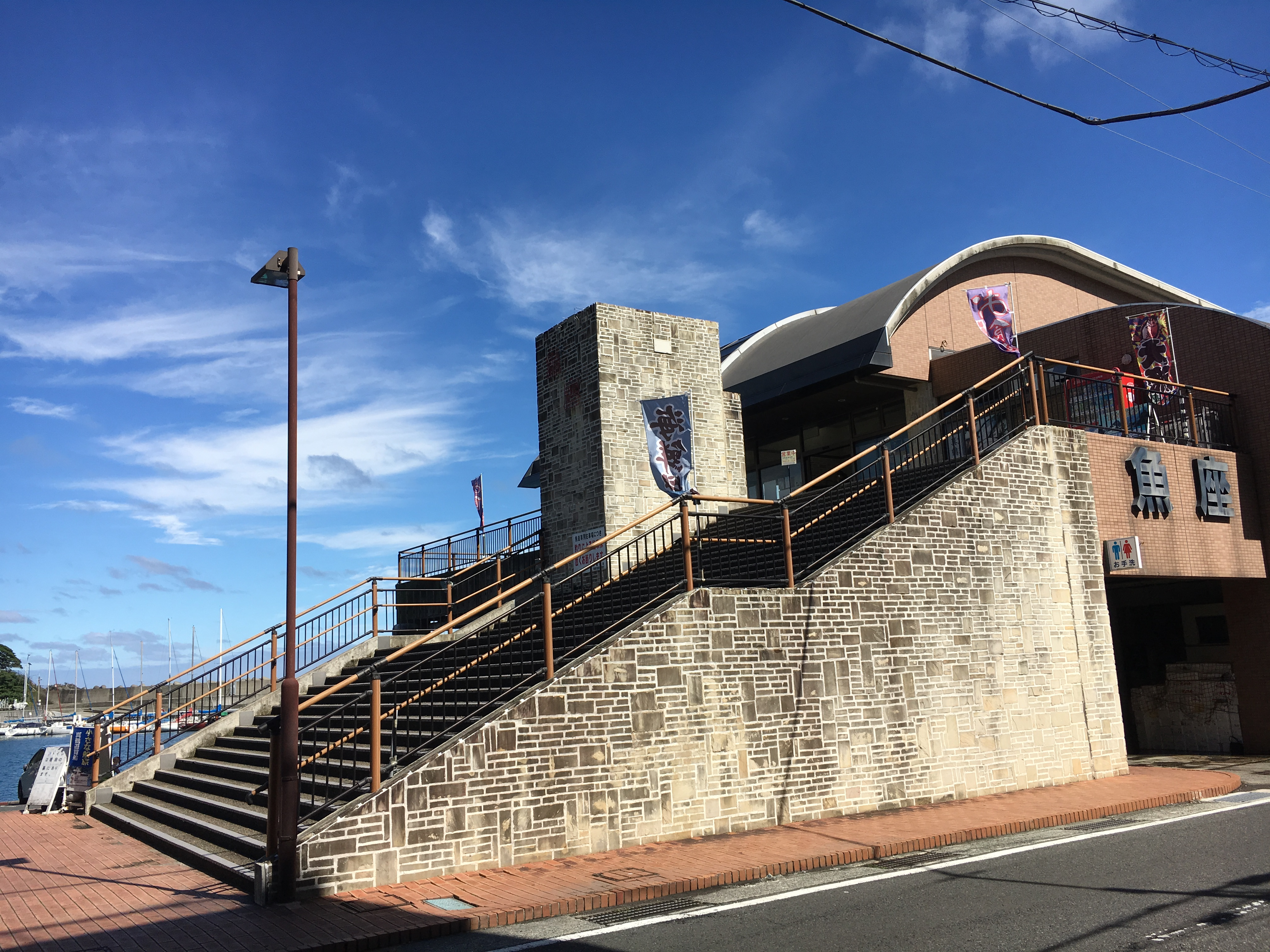
Sakanaza

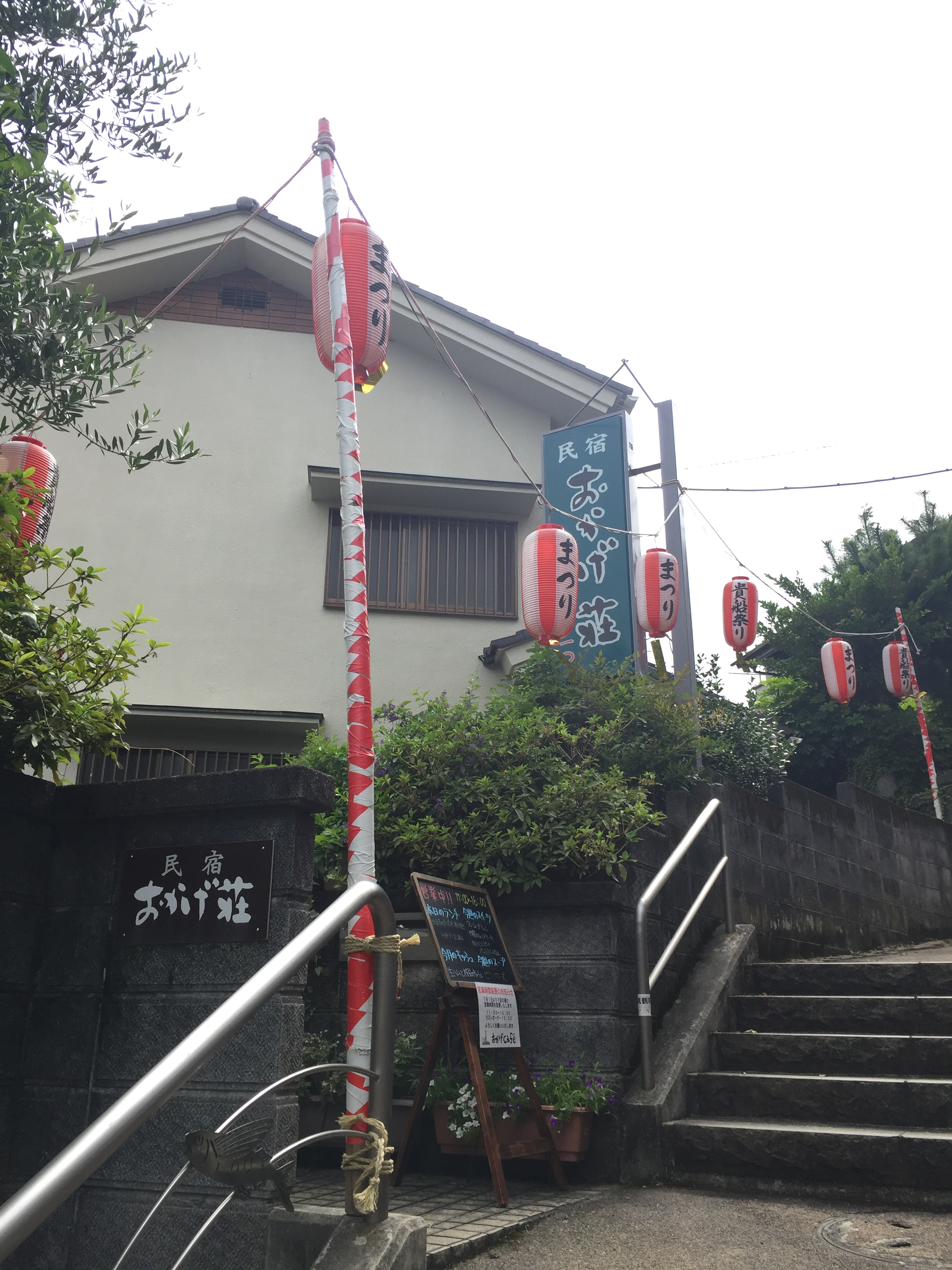
Setomichi

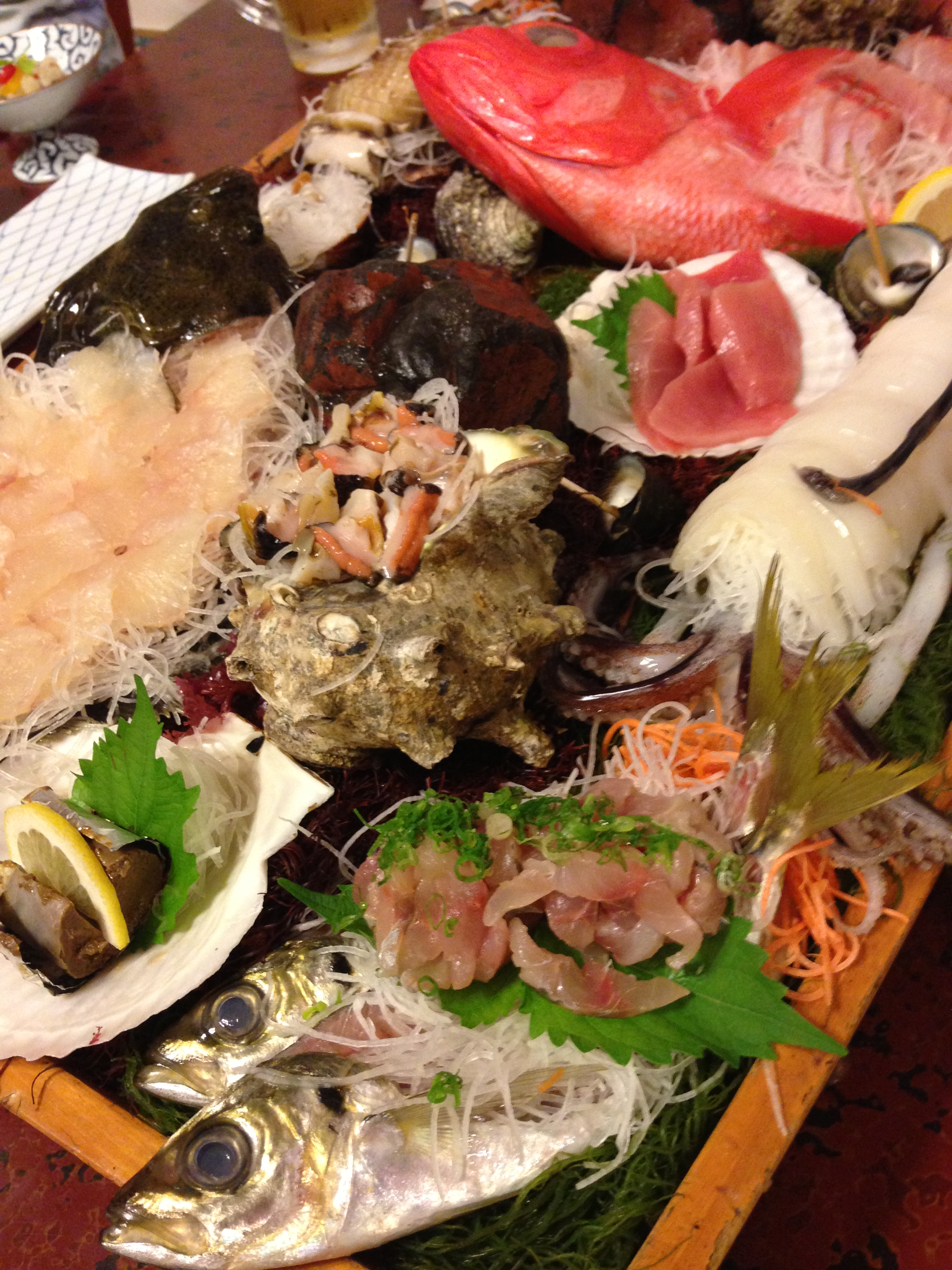
Sashimi boat

== Sister cities ==
- (Japan) Azumino, Nagano, since September 15, 1995
- (Japan) Hinohara, Tokyo, since March 28, 2014
- (Japan) Ama, Shimane, since July 10, 2017
