= Yugawara =

Yugawara 湯河原町
- Town
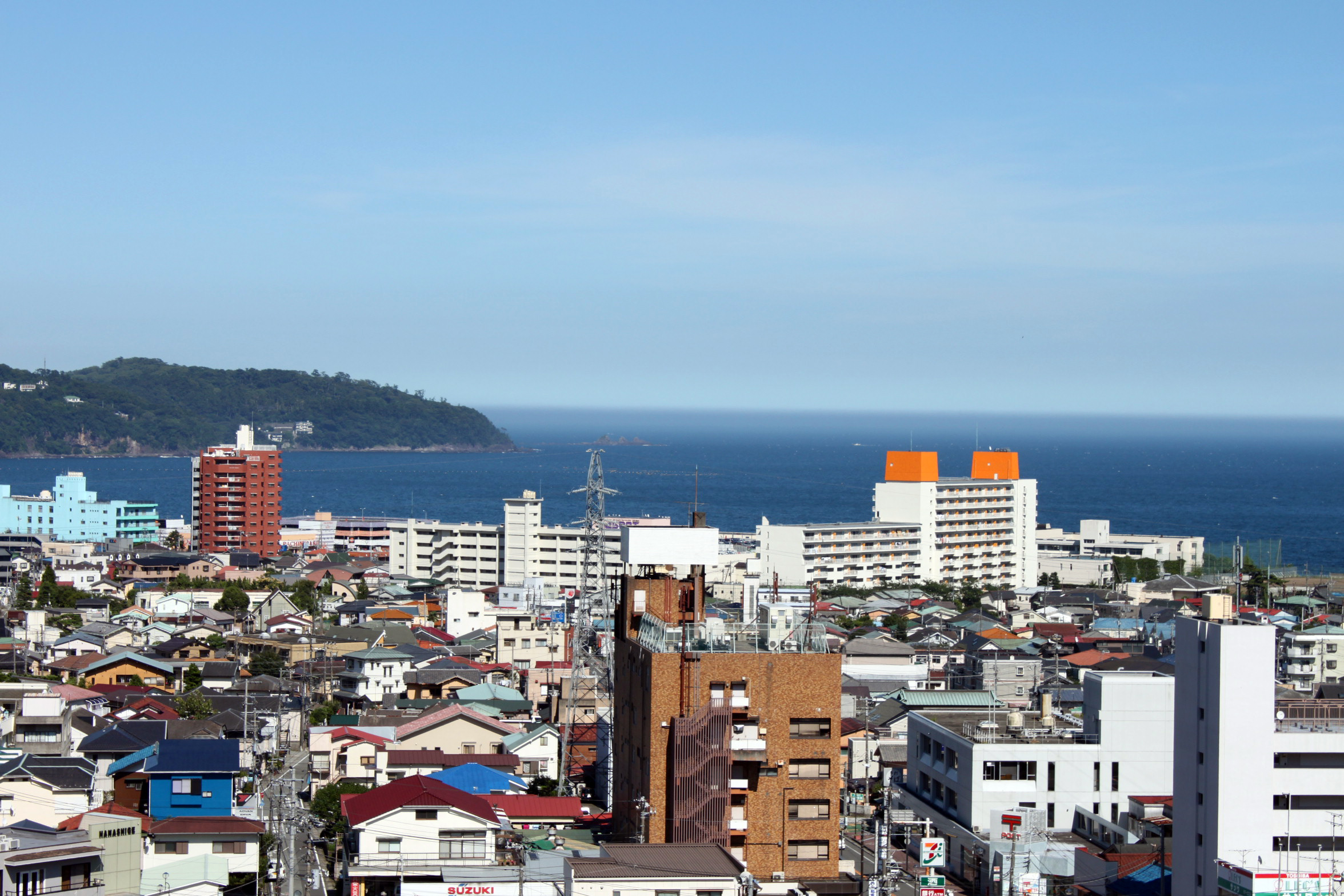
- Yugawara skyline

- Flag Seal

- Location of Yugawara in Kanagawa Prefecture

- Coordinates: 35°9′N 139°4′E
- Country: Japan
- Region: Kantō
- Prefecture: Kanagawa
- District: Ashigarashimo

Area
  - Total: 40.99 km^{2} (15.83 sq mi)

Population (May 1, 2021)
  - Total: 23,267
  - Density: 567.6/km^{2} (1,470/sq mi)
- Time zone: UTC+9 (Japan Standard Time)
- Symbols
  - Tree: Sakura, camellia
  - Flower: Mikan
  - Bird: Japanese white-eye
- Phone number: 0465-63-2111
- Address: 1-2-1 Chūō, Yugawara-machi, Ashigarashimo-gun, Kanagawa-ken 259-0392
- Website: Official website

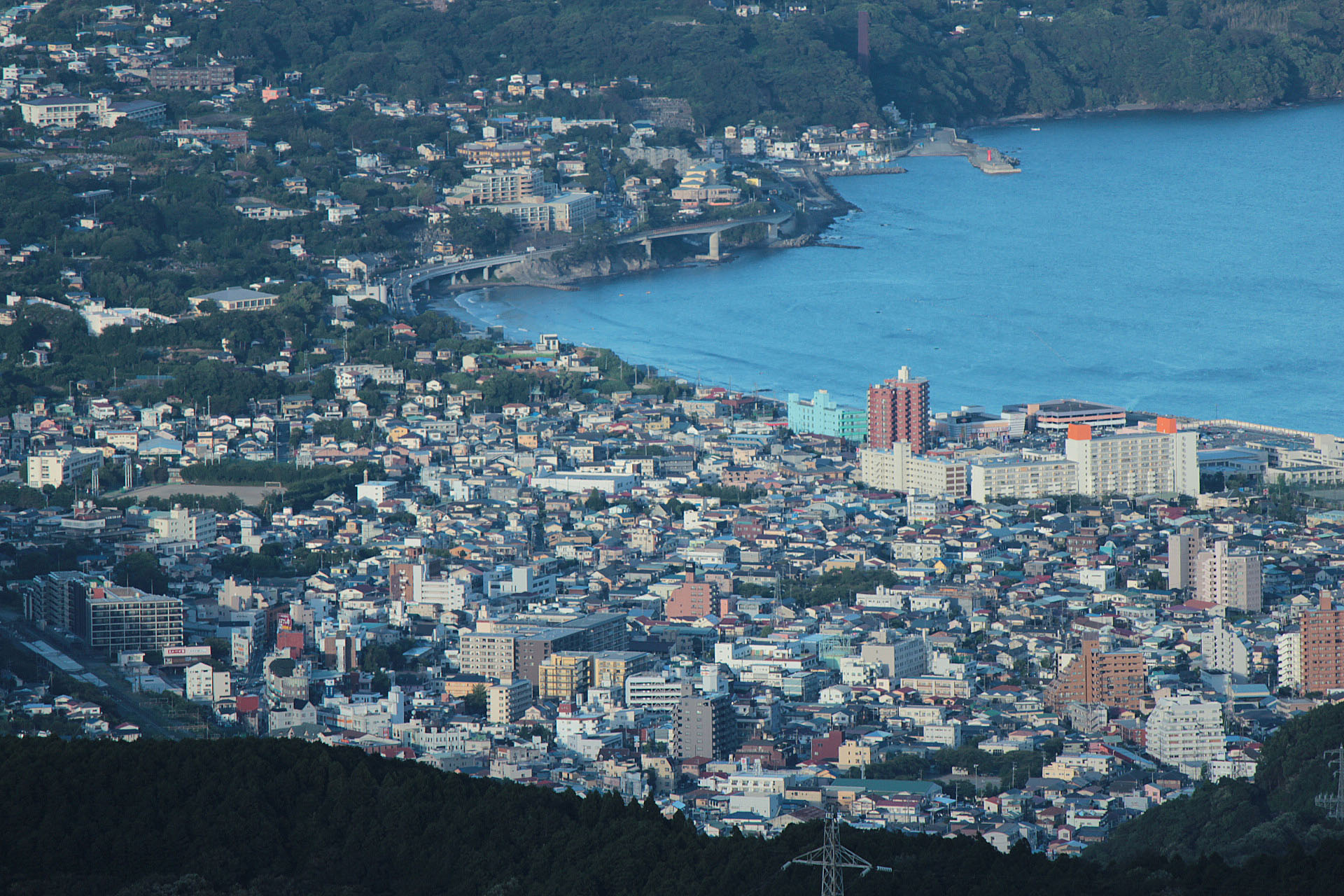
Downtown

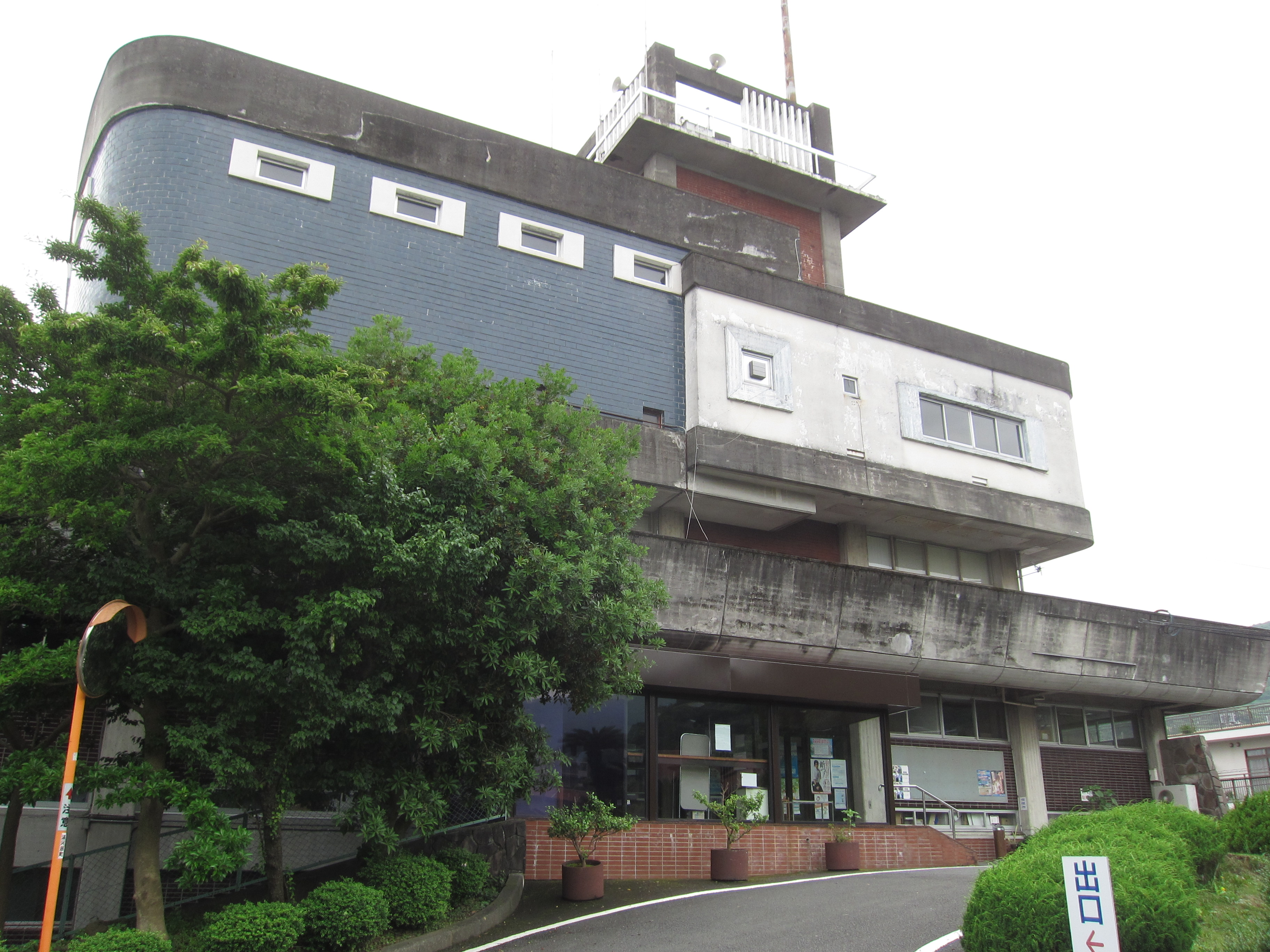
Yugawara Town Hall

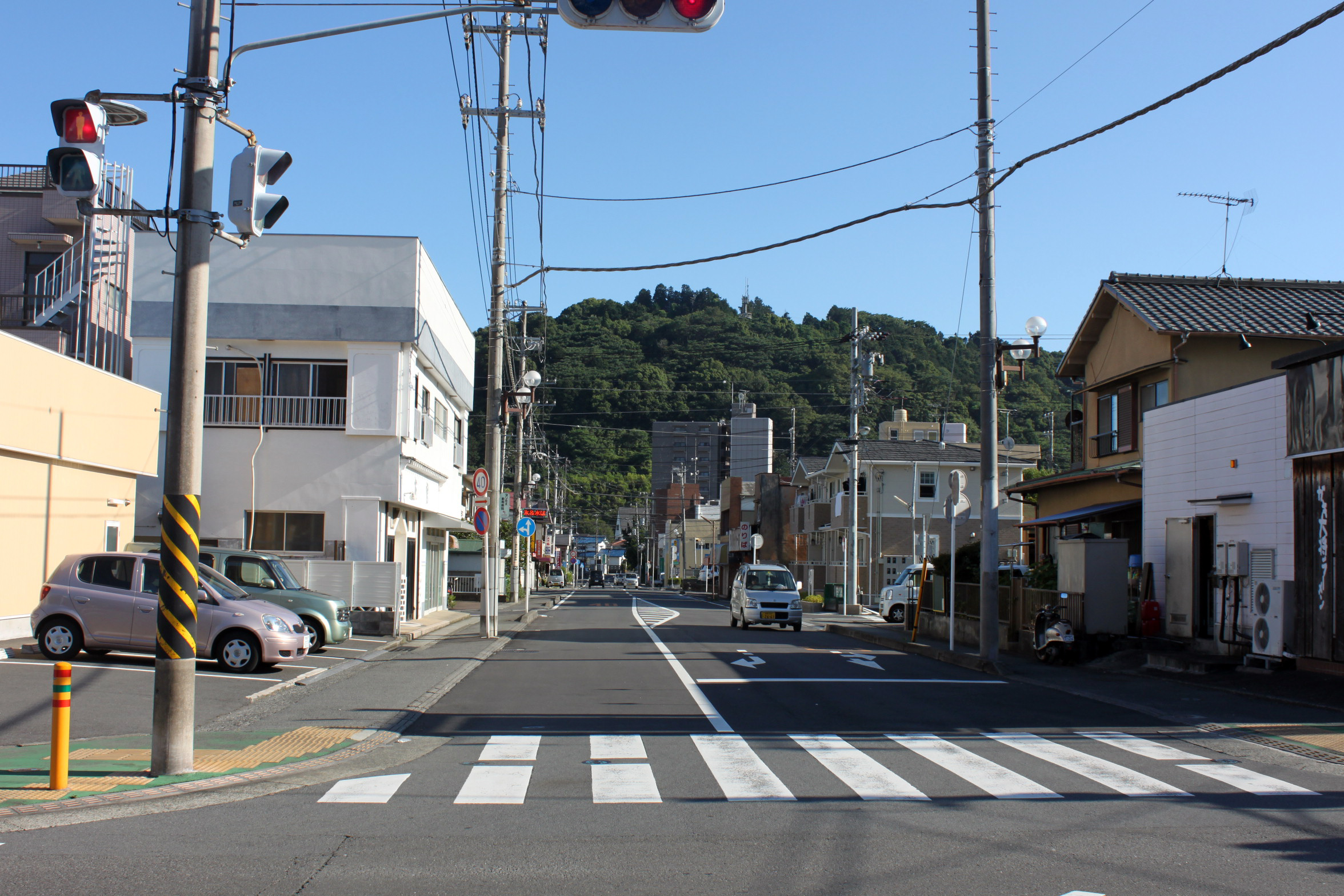
Street downtown

Yugawara (湯河原町, Yugawara-machi) is a town located in Ashigarashimo District, Kanagawa Prefecture, Japan. As of 1 May 2021, the town had an estimated population of 23,267 and a population density of 570 persons per km^{2}. The total area of the town is 40.99 square kilometres (15.83 sq mi).

== Geography ==
Yugawara is located in the far southwestern corner of the prefecture. The center of the town is located in the lowlands between the southern foot of Mount Hakone and the Sagami Bay. Much of the terrain formed by an eroded Quaternary volcano. In the northeast, bordering Manazuru Town, are gentle foothills where residential areas and mandarin orange fields coexist. In the south, hot spring resorts and residential areas are clustered along the north side of the Chitose River. The coastline has a sandy beach with a length of about 700 meters, which is crowded with swimmers in the summer.

=== Surrounding municipalities ===
Kanagawa Prefecture

- Hakone
- Manazuru
- Odawara

Shizuoka Prefecture

- Atami
- Kannami

=== Climate ===
Yugawara has a humid subtropical climate (Köppen Cfa) characterized by warm summers and cool winters with light to no snowfall. The average annual temperature in Yugawara is 14.2 °C. The average annual rainfall is 2221 mm with September as the wettest month. The temperatures are highest on average in August, at around 24.7 °C, and lowest in January, at around 4.2 °C.

== Demographics ==
Per Japanese census data, the population of Yugawara has remained relatively steady over the past 50 years. The major part of the local population is elderly, as Yugawara is famous for resorts catering especially to the elderly. The town has three public elementary schools and one public middle school. A prefectural high school was closed in 2008, and high-school students now study in the neighboring city of Odawara. Yugawara offers little night entertainment, though it does have bowling halls, supermarkets, restaurants and pubs. The suburbs of the town provide hotels and apartments for tourists seeking to enjoy hot spring baths, either during vacations or on weekends.

Historical population
| Year | Pop. | ±% |
|---|---|---|
| 1920 | 7,706 | — |
| 1930 | 10,239 | +32.9% |
| 1940 | 12,827 | +25.3% |
| 1950 | 16,973 | +32.3% |
| 1960 | 19,743 | +16.3% |
| 1970 | 23,299 | +18.0% |
| 1980 | 25,546 | +9.6% |
| 1990 | 27,717 | +8.5% |
| 2000 | 27,721 | +0.0% |
| 2010 | 26,848 | −3.1% |
| 2020 | 23,426 | −12.7% |

== History ==
During the Kamakura period, the area around Yugawara was called "Doi County" in Sagami Province. The area was under control of the later Hōjō clan in the Sengoku period, and part of Odawara Domain during the Edo period. After the Meiji Restoration, it was divided into six hamlets, and initially formed part of the short-lived Ashigara Prefecture, before becoming part of Ashigarashimo District of Kanagawa Prefecture. In April 1889, four of the six hamlets merged to form Doi village with the establishment of the modern municipalities system. The remaining two hamlets merged to form Yoshihama village. On July 1, 1926, Doi village was elevated to town status, taking the new name of Yugawara. Yoshihama attained town status on April 1, 1940, and merged into Yugawara on April 1, 1955. A planned merger of Yugawara into Odawara in 2005 was rejected by local voters in an August 8, 2004 referendum.

== Economy ==
Yugawara has many onsen hot spring resorts, and tourism plays a major role in the local economy, within easy access from Tokyo. Agriculture and commercial fishing play secondary roles in the local economy.

== Government ==
Yugawara has a mayor-council form of government with a directly elected mayor and a unicameral town council of 14 members. Yugawara, together with neighboring Manazuru, contributes one member to the Kanagawa Prefectural Assembly. In terms of national politics, the town is part of Kanagawa 16th district of the lower house of the Diet of Japan.

== Education ==
Yugawara has three public elementary schools and one public middle school operated by the town government. The town does not have a high school.

== Transportation ==
=== Railroad ===
JR East – Tōkaidō Main Line

- Yugawara

=== Highway ===
- National Route 135

== Sister city relations ==
- (South Korea) Chungju, Republic of Korea
- Mihara, Japan
- Port Stephens, New South Wales, Australia

== Notable people ==
- Yukiya Amano, diplomat, Director of IAEA
- Juzo Itami, film director and actor, and his wife Nobuko Miyamoto, actress, who spent much of their adult lives in Yugawara
- Jungo Kono, professional soccer player
- Marutei Tsurunen, former member of the Upper House, first Westerner to hold a political office in Japan
- Taichi Yamada, screenwriter
