= Enjō-ji Hōjō residence ruins =

Hōjō Residence ruins (Enjō-ji ruins)
- 北条氏邸跡(円成寺跡) (Japanese)
- Hōjō Residence ruins (Enjō-ji ruins) Enjō-ji Hōjō residence ruins (Japan)
- 35°2′47.0″N 138°56′14.0″E
- Periods: Muromachi period
- Location: Izunokuni, Shizuoka, Japan
- Region: Tōkai region

Site notes
- Public access: Yes (no public facilities)

The Hōjō Residence ruins (Enjō-ji ruins) (北条氏邸跡(円成寺跡), Hōjō-shi-tei (Enjō-ji ato)) is an archaeological site containing the ruins of the late Heian through Kamakura period residence of the Hōjō clan in the Jike neighborhood of the city of Izunokuni, Shizuoka in the Tōkai region of Japan. The site was designated a National Historic Site of Japan in 1996, with the area under protection expanded in 2005

== Overview ==
Following the destruction of the Hōjō clan at the Battle of Kamakura in 1333, the widow of Hōjō Takatoki, Kakukai Enjō (覚海円成) relocated from Kamakura to the Hōjō ancestral territory of Nirayama in Izu Province together with surviving women relatives and ladies-in-waiting. She built a nunnery on this site with the assistance of Ashikaga Tadayoshi, where she died in 1345. The nunnery was used briefly during the Muromachi period for daughters of the Uesugi clan wished to enter into a religious life, and it served as a temporary palace after the nearby Horigoe Gosho was destroyed by a fire in 1460; however, the temple fell into rapid decline afterwards and disappeared from records before the start of the Edo period.

The site is located on the Kano River at the northwestern foot of Mount Moriyama. On the eastern side of Mount Moriyama is the temple of Ganjōju-in founded by Hōjō Tokimasa.

Archaeological excavations were carried out in 1992 and 1993, uncovering the foundations of a building trace along with a large number of excavated remains from the end of the Heian period to the beginning of the Kamakura period. In 2007, excavations were suspended and the study area was backfilled with sand pending review of the findings and a determine on how to best preserve and utilize the site. It is located about a 25-minute walk from Nirayama Station on the Izuhakone Railway.

== See also ==
- List of Historic Sites of Japan (Shizuoka)
