= Kannami =

Kannami 函南町
- Town
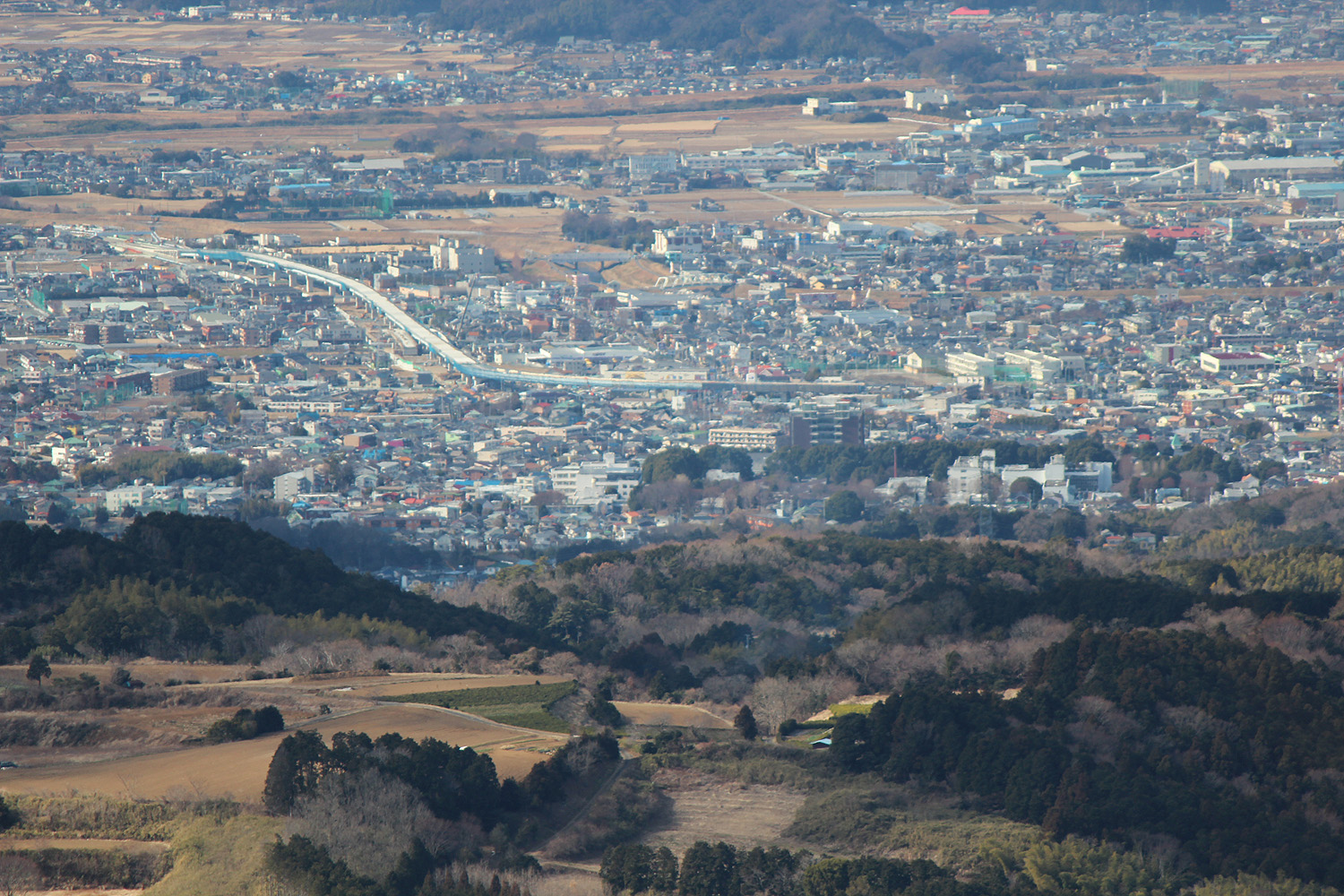
- A view of downtown Kannami

- Flag Emblem

- Location of Kannami in Shizuoka Prefecture

- Coordinates: 35°5′20.2″N 138°57′12.2″E
- Country: Japan
- Region: Chūbu; Tōkai
- Prefecture: Shizuoka
- District: Tagata

Area
  - Total: 65.16 km^{2} (25.16 sq mi)

Population (July 31, 2019)
  - Total: 37,782
  - Density: 579.8/km^{2} (1,502/sq mi)
- Time zone: UTC+9 (Japan Standard Time)
- Tree: Stewartia
- Flower: Sakura
- Phone number: 055-979-8105
- Address: 717-13, Hirai, Kannnami-chō, Tagata-gun, Shizuoka-ken 419-0192
- Website: Official website

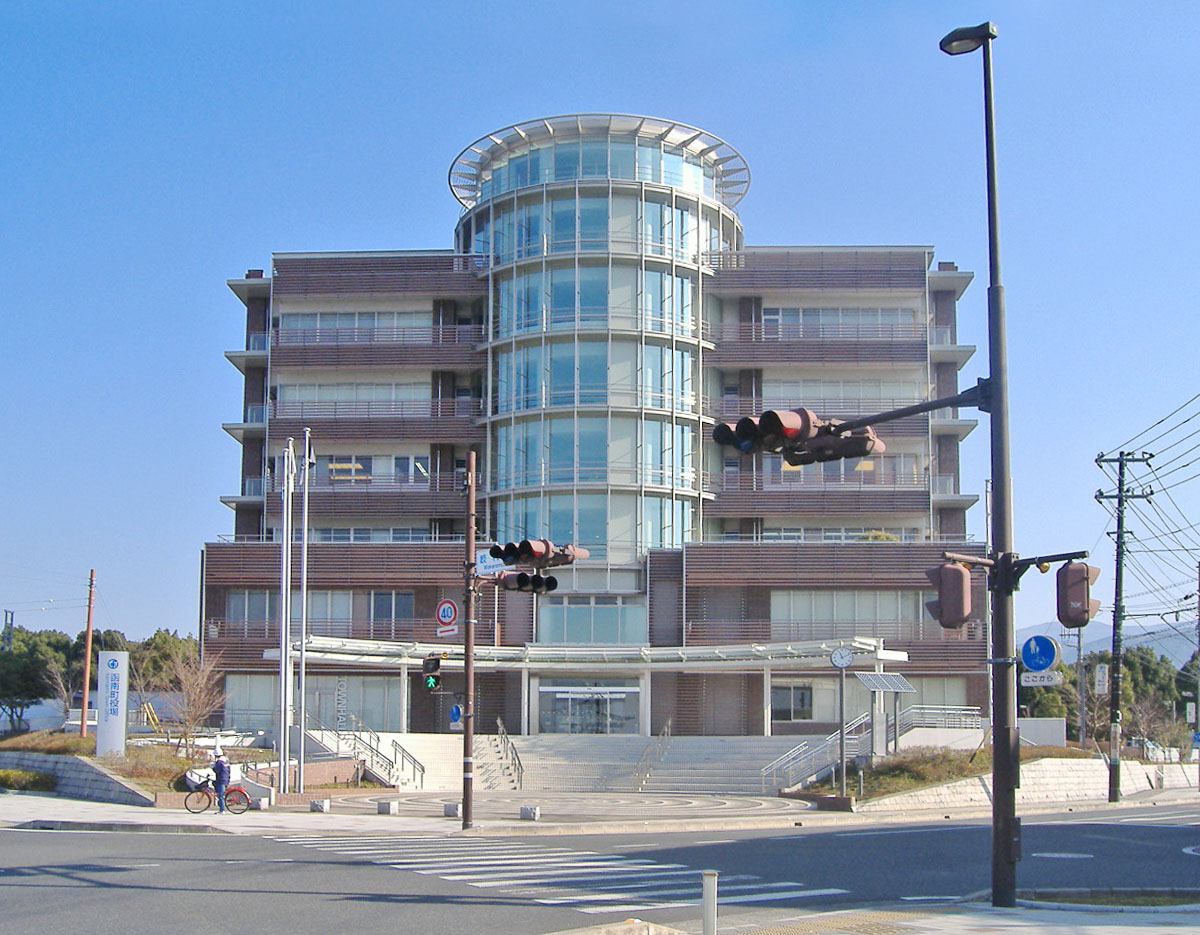
Kannami Town Office

Kannami (函南町, Kannami-chō) is a town located in Tagata District, Shizuoka Prefecture, Japan. As of 1 August 2019, the town had an estimated population of 37,782 in 16,401 households and a population density of 580 persons per km^{2}. The total area of the town was 65.16 square kilometres (25.16 sq mi).

== Geography ==
Kannami is located in an inland area in far eastern Shizuoka Prefecture, and the "root" of the Izu Peninsula, and in the southern foothills of the Hakone Mountains and the Tanzawa Mountains. The Kano River passes through the town.

== Neighboring municipalities ==
- Kanagawa Prefecture
  - Hakone
  - Yugawara
- Shizuoka Prefecture
  - Atami
  - Izunokuni
  - Mishima
  - Numazu

== Demographics ==
Per Japanese census data, the population of Kannami has been increasing over the past 50 years.

Historical population
Year	Pop.	±%
1940	10,625	—
1950	14,953	+40.7%
1960	15,505	+3.7%
1970	17,738	+14.4%
1980	28,749	+62.1%
1990	35,191	+22.4%
2000	38,611	+9.7%
2010	38,574	−0.1%

=== Climate ===
The city has a climate characterized by hot and humid summers, and relatively mild winters (Köppen climate classification Cfa). The average annual temperature in Kannami is 14.4 °C. The average annual rainfall is 1999 mm with September as the wettest month. The temperatures are highest on average in August, at around 25.2 °C, and lowest in January, at around 4.4 °C.

== History ==
During the Edo period, all of Izu Province was tenryō territory under direct control of the Tokugawa shogunate. During the cadastral reform of the early Meiji period in 1889, the village of Kannami was created within Tagata District, Shizuoka Prefecture. On April 1, 1962, it was elevated to town status.

== Economy ==
The economy of Kannami is primarily based on agriculture. Major products include strawberries, cucumbers and dairy products. The town is also a bedroom community for neighboring Mishima.

== Education ==
Kannami has five public elementary schools and two public middle schools operated by the town government. The town has one public high school operated by the Shizuoka Prefectural Board of Education.

== Transportation ==
=== Railway ===
- Central Japan Railway Company - Tōkaidō Main Line
  - Kannami
- Izuhakone Railway Sunzu Line
  - Izu-Nitta

=== Highway ===
- Izu-Jūkan Expressway
- Izu Chuodo
- National Route 1
- National Route 136

== Sister cities ==
- Kerman, California, United States, since October 12, 1985

== Notable people from Kannami ==
- Atsuto Uchida – professional soccer player
