= Egawa Hidetatsu =

Egawa Hidetatsu 江川英龍
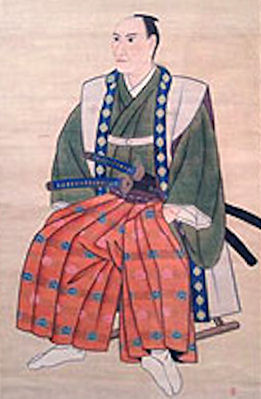
- Egawa Hidetatsu autoportrait
- Born: June 23, 1801; Nirayama, Shizuoka, Japan
- Died: March 4, 1855 (aged 53); Japan
- Occupations: educator, politician

Egawa Tarōzaemon Hidetatsu (江川 太郎左衛門 英龍; Japanese pronunciation: [ta.ɾoː.(d)zaꜜ.e.moɴ], June 23, 1801 - March 1, 1855) was a Japanese Bakufu intendant of the 19th century. He was Daikan, in charge of the domains of the Tokugawa shogunate in Izu, Sagami and Kai Provinces during the Bakumatsu period. He took a leading role in the reinforcement of Japanese coastal defenses against Western encroachments in the 19th century.

== Coastal defenses ==
Due to his holdings on the coast, Egawa Hidetatsu was involved in issues of coastal defences, critical to Japan at that time. He was in relations with the group of Watanabe Kazan, and Takano Chōei.

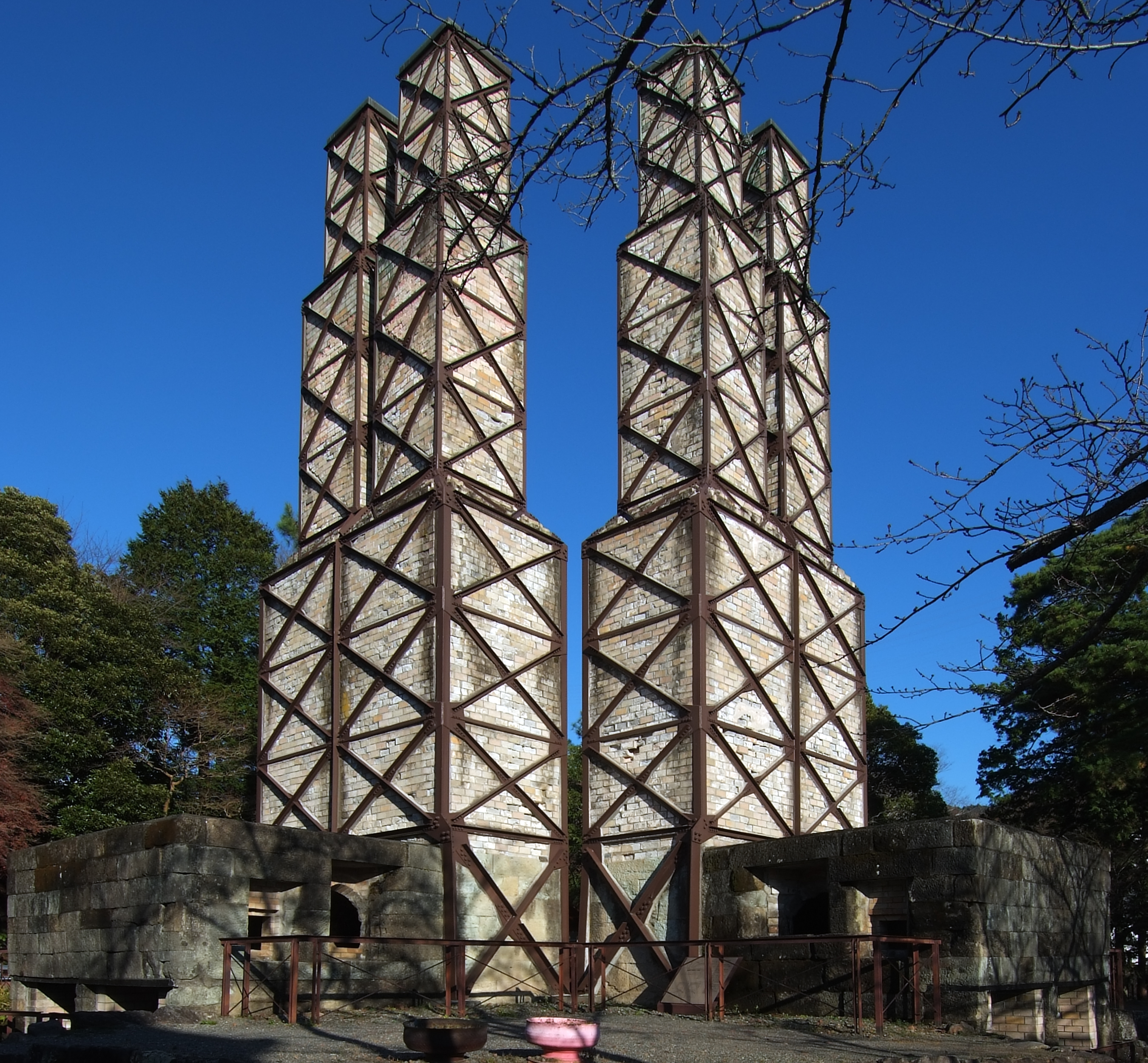
Nirayama (韮山) reverberatory furnace in Izunokuni, Shizuoka Japan built by Egawa Hidetasu. Construction began in November 1853, and after 3 years 6 months was completed in 1857 and operated until 1864.

Egawa Hidetatsu was put in charge of establishing the defense of Edo Bay against Western intrusions in 1839, following the incident of the Morrison under Charles W. King in 1837. In 1841, Egawa permitted the gunnery demonstrations of Takashima Shūhan to the Tokugawa Shogunate.

As early as 1842, Egawa attempted to build a furnace to cast weapons in the village of Nirayama in the Izu Peninsula. After sending a student to study the furnace which had been built in the Saga Domain, a new furnace was built which succeeded in casting cannons in 1858, after the death of Egawa.

Egawa taught Western gunnery and techniques to numerous men who would later have a role in the Meiji Restoration. He also advocated the conscription of farmers into the army.

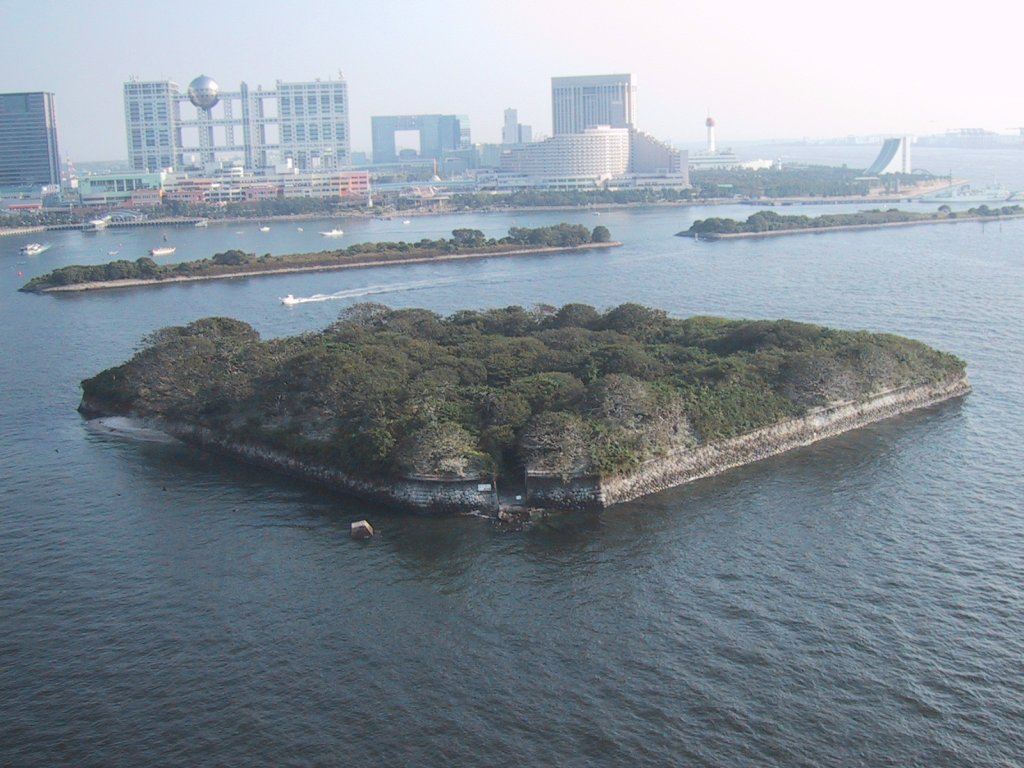
Egawa Hidetatsu designed and built the artillery batteries of Odaiba at the entrance of Edo in 1853-54.

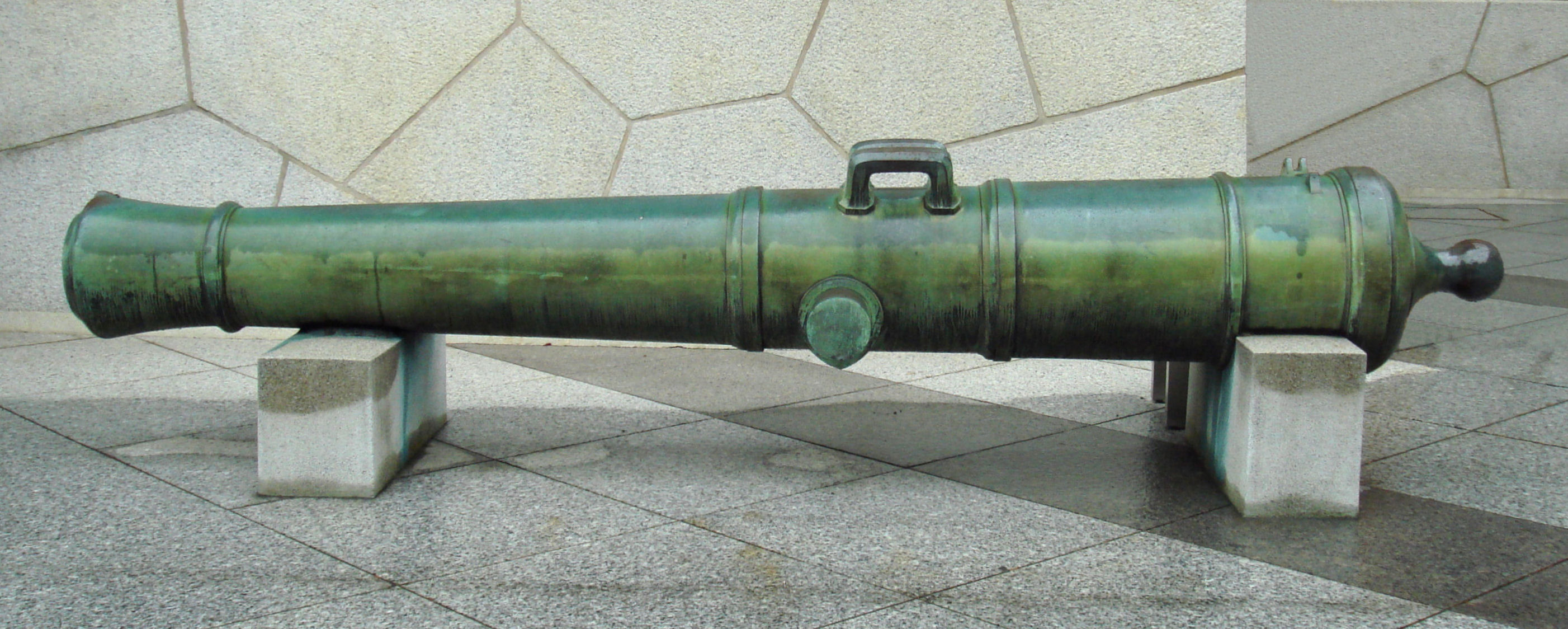
One of the cannons of Odaiba, now at the Yasukuni Shrine. 80-pound bronze, bore: 250mm, length: 3830mm.

Egawa also designed and built the battery emplacements at the entrance of Edo harbour at Odaiba in 1853/54, following the 1853 visit of Commodore Perry and his promise to return the following year. The fortifications were built to prevent the intrusion near Tokyo of the foreign ships. Commodore Perry would effectively stop his fleet at Uraga, southward at the entrance of Edo Bay, fully prepared for hostilities if his negotiations with the Japanese failed. His ships were equipped with modern Paixhans shell guns, capable of bringing destruction everywhere a shell landed.

== Westernization debate ==
Egawa was involved in an important debate at that time, whether to adopt Western guns and methods or not. He advocated that the English had shown great superiority over the Chinese in the 1840 Opium War, and that it was necessary to use their own techniques to repel them. Others, such as Torii Yōzō argued that only traditional Japanese methods should be employed and reinforced. Egawa argued that just as Confucianism and Buddhism had been introduced from abroad, it made sense to introduce useful Western techniques. Sakuma Shōzan was a student of a school founded by Egawa Hidetatsu.

A theoretical synthesis of "Western knowledge" and "Eastern morality" would later be accomplished by Sakuma Shōzan and Yokoi Shōnan, in view of "controlling the barbarians with their own methods".

At one point Egawa hired the services of Nakahama Manjirō, a Japanese castaway who had spent 10 years in the West before returning to Japan, in order to obtain better knowledge of the West.

== See also ==
- Shōshikai
- Late Tokugawa Shogunate
