= Takanobu Hozumi =

Japanese actor (1931–2018)

- 鈴木 隆信
- Born: Takanobu Suzuki; July 20, 1931; Ōhito, Shizuoka, Japan (now Izunokuni)
- Died: October 19, 2018 (aged 87); Kanagawa Prefecture, Japan
- Occupations: Actor; voice actor
- Years active: 1950–2018
- Height: 172 cm (5 ft 8 in)

Takanobu Suzuki (鈴木 隆信, Suzuki Takanobi; 20 July 1931 – 19 October 2018), better known as Takanobu Hozumi (穂積 隆信, Hozumi Takanobu), was a Japanese actor from Ōhito, Shizuoka (now Izunokuni) attached to Mausu Promotion.

He died of gallbladder cancer at the age of 87.

== Filmography ==
=== Live-action ===
==== Film ====
- Nichiren and the Great Mongol Invasion (1958)
- The Donkey Comes on a Tank (1964) (Officer Momota)
- The X from Outer Space (1967) (FAFC technical officer)
- Tora-san's Love Call (1971) (Osamu Suwa)
- Goodbye Morocco (1974) (Mura-san)
- Kichiku (1978) (Mizuguchi)
- Incident (1978) (Tabuchi)
- Tora-san Goes Religious? (1983) (Osamu)
- Chōchin (1987)
- Mr. Baseball (1992) (Hiroshi Nakamura)

=== Voice acting ===
==== Television animation ====
- Cybersix (xxxx) (Doctor Von Reichter)
- L/R: Licensed by Royalty (xxxx) (Taylor)
- Tenshi no Takutikusu ~Yume no Kakera wa Koroshi no Kaori~ (xxxx) (Chingensai)

==== OVA ====
- Ginga Eiyū Densetsu (xxxx) (Neguroponty)

==== Theatrical animation ====
- Boku no Son Gokū (xxxx) (Tentei)
- Detective Conan: Jolly Roger in the Deep Azure (xxxx) (Kazuo Mima)
- Doraemon: Nobita to Fushigi Kazetsukai (xxxx) (Elder)
- Doraemon: Nobita to Robot Kingdom (xxxx) (Doctor Chapekku)
- Esper Mami: Hoshizora's Dancing Doll (xxxx) (Megumi's Papa)
- Genma Taisen (xxxx) (Kafū)
- Hoshi no Orpheus (1978)
- WXIII Kidō Keisatsu Patlabor (2002) (Toshirō Kurisu)

==== Video games ====
- GeGeGe no Kitarō: Ibun Yōkai Kitan (xxxx) (Konaki Jijii)
- GeGeGe no Kitarō: Kikiippotsu! Yōkai Rettō (xxxx) (Konaki Jijii)
- Onimusha 2: Samurai's Destiny (xxxx) (Ginghamphatts)
- Spyro 2: Ripto's Rage! (xxxx) (The Professor)
- Yoshitsuneki (xxxx) (Taira no Kiyomori)

==== Dubbing roles ====
- Christopher Lloyd
  - Back to the Future (TV Asahi edition) (Dr. Emmett "Doc" Brown)
  - Back to the Future Part II (TV Asahi edition) (Dr. Emmett "Doc" Brown)
  - Back to the Future Part III (TV Asahi edition) (Dr. Emmett "Doc" Brown)
  - The Pagemaster (Mr. Dewey / The Pagemaster)
  - Alice in Wonderland (White Knight)
  - Chuck (Dr. Leo Dreyfus)
  - Piranha 3D (Mr. Goodman)
  - Piranha 3DD (Mr. Goodman)
  - The Michael J. Fox Show (Principal McTavish)
  - I Am Not a Serial Killer (Crowley)
  - Going in Style (Milton Kupchak)
- Eli Wallach
  - The Magnificent Seven (1974 TV Asahi edition) (Calvera)
  - Lord Jim (The General)
  - How to Steal a Million (Davis Leland)
  - A Lovely Way to Die (Tennessee Fredericks)
  - Mackenna's Gold (TV Asahi edition) (Ben Baker)
  - Cinderella Liberty (Forshay)
- 12 Angry Men (Juror #4 (E. G. Marshall))
- 12 Angry Men (Juror #8 (Jack Lemmon))
- Airport 1975 (Scott Freeman)
- Alien (1992 VHS/DVD edition) (Brett (Harry Dean Stanton))
- Coming to America (1991 Fuji TV edition) (Cleo McDowell (John Amos))
- Crimson Tide (Nippon TV edition) (Captain Frank Ramsey)
- Day of the Animals (Paul Jenson)
- The Deep (Romer Treece)
- Dinosaurs (B.P. Richfield)
- Django (1980 TV Tokyo edition) (General Hugo Rodríguez)
- Duel (TV edition) (David Mann (Dennis Weaver))
- The Fly II (Anton Bartok (Lee Richardson))
- For Your Eyes Only (TBS edition) (Aristotle Kristatos (Julian Glover))
- The Godfather (1976 NTV edition) (Santino "Sonny" Corleone (James Caan))
- The Godfather Part II (1980 NTV edition) (Santino "Sonny" Corleone (James Caan))
- The Hot Rock (Andy Kelp)
- Lawrence of Arabia (1981 TV Asahi edition) (Jackson Bentley (Arthur Kennedy))
- Little House on the Prairie (Doctor Hiram Baker)
- Midnight Cowboy (TV Asahi edition) (Enrico "Ratso" Rizzo)
- Mighty Morphin Power Rangers: The Movie (Ivan Ooze)
- Never Talk to Strangers (Max Cheski (Harry Dean Stanton))
- Perry Mason (Perry Mason)
- Speed (Howard Payne (Dennis Hopper))
- Super Mario Bros. (King Koopa (Dennis Hopper))
- Trading Places (1992 Fuji TV edition) (Coleman (Denholm Elliott))
- UFO (Doctor Doug Jackson)
