= Toshiko Ono =

Japanese politician

- 小野 登志子

Mayor of Izunokuni
- In office 24 April 2013 – 23 April 2021
- Preceded by: Yoshikazu Mochizuki
- Succeeded by: Masayuki Yamashita

Member of Shizuoka Prefectural Assembly
- In office 30 April 2003 – 4 March 2013
- Succeeded by: Motoyoshi Tsuchiya
- Constituency: Tagata District (2003–2007); Izunokuni City (2007–2013)

Member of Nirayama Town Council
- In office September 2001 – April 2003

Personal details
- Born: 20 April 1944 (age 82) Izunokuni, Shizuoka, Japan
- Party: Liberal Democratic
- Education: Nihon University

Toshiko Ono (小野登志子, Ono Toshiko; born 20 April 1944) is a Japanese politician who was the mayor of Izunokuni city for two terms, serving from 2013 to 2021. Her previous offices include the member of Shizuoka Prefectural Assembly (Note: Serving 3 terms, from 2003 to 2013) and the member of Nirayama Municipality, which was abolished in 2005. (Note: Serving from 2001 to 2003.) She was also the first female mayor in the history of Shizuoka Prefecture. She retired from her political life in 2021, after losing her re-appointment election of Izunokuni city's mayor with huge differences between the current mayor of the city, Masayuki Yamashita.

== Early life and education ==
Ono was born in the Izunokuni City of Shizuoka Prefecture in a family engaging in midwifery hospital's work. After her graduation in Nihon University College of Art, she worked in her family's midwifery hospital followed by her first victory of municipal assembly election of Nirayama city in 2001.

== Relatives ==
Her eldest son, Norikazu Ono, was elected as the general manager of the Shizuoka 5th Ward of the House of Representatives of the former National Democratic Party on 27 November 2019. When the former National Democratic Party and the former Constitutional Democratic Party merged and the new Constitutional Democratic Party (CDP) was established in September 2020, he became the general branch president of the same district representing CDP. After that, he ran for the 2021 House of Representatives election, but was defeated by Goshi Hosono.
