= Izunokuni =

Izunokuni 伊豆の国市
- City
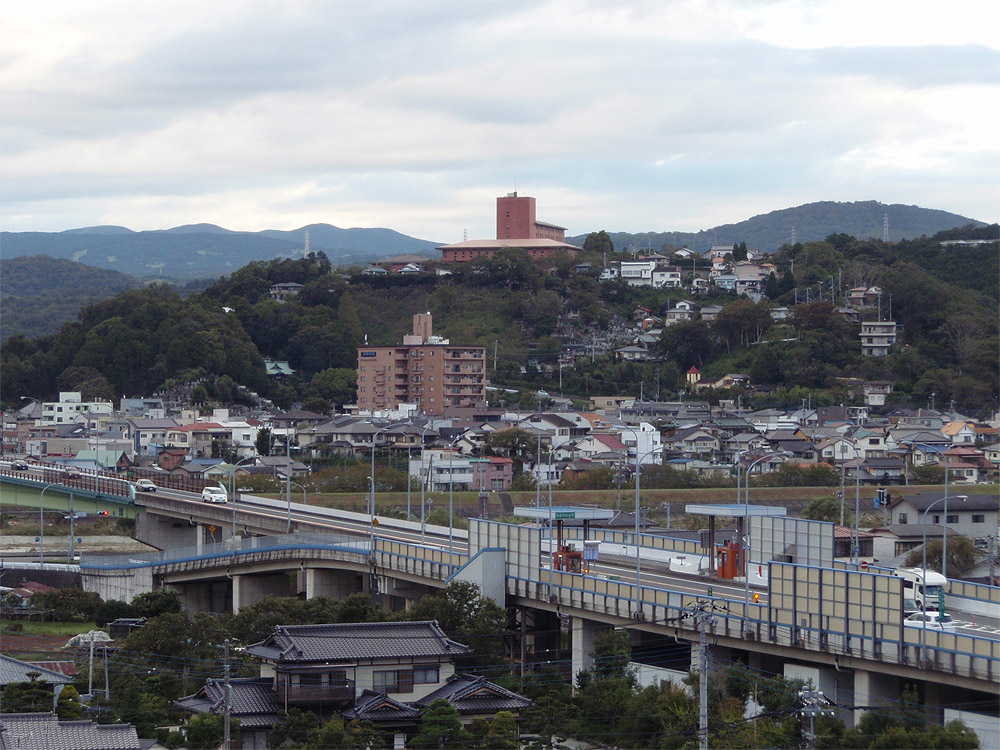
- Ohito onsen in Izunokuni

- Flag Emblem
- Interactive map of Izunokuni
- Coordinates: 35°2′N 138°56′E
- Country: Japan
- Region: Chūbu (Tōkai)
- Prefecture: Shizuoka

Government
  - Mayor: Masayuki Yamashita

Area
  - Total: 94.62 km^{2} (36.53 sq mi)

Population (July 2019)
  - Total: 48,579
  - Density: 513.4/km^{2} (1,330/sq mi)
- Time zone: UTC+9 (Japan Standard Time)
- Tree: Nageia nagi
- Flower: viola
- Phone number: 055-948-1413
- Address: 340-1 Nakaoka Izunokuni-shi, Shizuoka-ken 410-2292
- Website: Official website

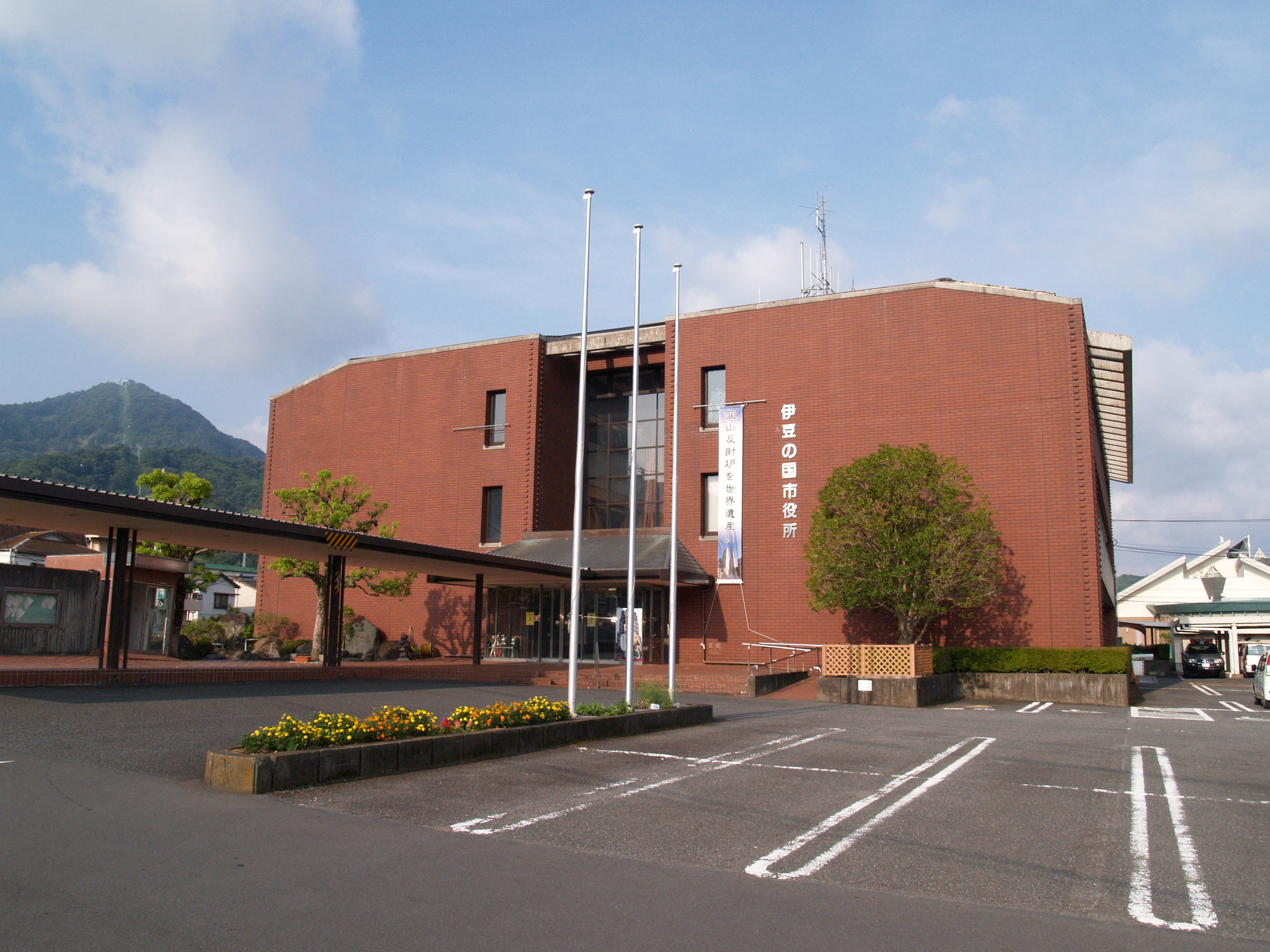
Izunokuni City Hall

Izunokuni (伊豆の国市, Izunokuni-shi; Japanese pronunciation: [ì.(d͡)zɨ́.nó̞.kɯ̈́.ɲ̟í(.ɕì)]) is a city located in Shizuoka Prefecture, Japan. As of 10 July 2019, the city had an estimated population of 48,579 in 21,257 households and a population density of 506 persons per km^{2}. The total area of the city is 94.62 square kilometres (36.53 sq mi).

== Geography ==
Izunokuni is located on the northern "neck" of the Izu Peninsula in eastern Shizuoka Prefecture. The region is hilly, with numerous hot springs. The climate of the region is temperate maritime, with hot, humid summers and short, cool winters, with the warm Kuroshio Current offshore having a moderating effect.

=== Surrounding municipalities ===
- Atami
- Izu
- Itō
- Numazu
- Kannami

== Demographics ==
Per Japanese census data, the population of Izunokuni has been relatively stable over the past 30 years.

Historical population
Year	Pop.	±%
1960	33,049	—
1970	37,984	+14.9%
1980	44,046	+16.0%
1990	48,369	+9.8%
2000	50,062	+3.5%
2010	49,274	−1.6%

=== Climate ===
The city has a climate characterized by characterized by hot and humid summers, and relatively mild winters (Köppen climate classification Cfa). The average annual temperature in Izunokuni is 16.0 °C. The average annual rainfall is 1981 mm with September as the wettest month. The temperatures are highest on average in August, at around 26.5 °C, and lowest in January, at around 6.2 °C.

== History ==
During the late Heian and Kamakura periods, the town of Nirayama within the current borders of Izunokuni was the home of the Later Hōjō clan, who dominated Japanese politics in the 12th century. A castle was established at Nirayama by Ise Moritoki in 1493. During the Edo period, most of Izu Province was tenryō territory under direct control of the Tokugawa shogunate, who ruled Izu and parts of eastern Suruga Province from a daikansho established at Nirayama. After the Meiji Restoration, the area became the short-lived Nirayama Prefecture, which was merged into the equally short-lived Ashigara Prefecture in 1871. From 1876, the area has been part of Shizuoka Prefecture. During the cadastral reform of 1886, the area was reorganized into several villages under Kimisawa District, which was with Tagata District in 1896. In 1934, the village of Izunagaoka was elevated to town status, followed by Ōhito in 1940, and Nirayama in 1962.

The city of Izunokuni was created on April 1, 2005 from the merger of the towns of Izunagaoka, Nirayama and Ōhito (all from Tagata District).

== Government ==
Izunokuni has a mayor-council form of government with a directly elected mayor and a unicameral city legislature of 17 members. The city contributes one member to the Shizuoka Prefectural Assembly. The current mayor of the city is Masayuki Yamashita, succeeding Toshiko Ono in 2021.

== Economy ==
The economy of Izunokuni is dominated by agriculture (strawberries and tomatoes) and by tourism related to the hot spring resort industry.

== Education ==
Izunokuni has six public elementary schools and three public junior high schools operated by the city government, and two public high schools operated by the Shizuoka Prefectural Board of Education. The prefecture also operates one special education school for the handicapped.

== Transportation ==
=== Railway ===
- Izuhakone Railway - Sunzu Line
  - Baraki - Nirayama - Izu-Nagaoka - Ōhito - Takyō

=== Highway ===
- Izu-Jūkan Expressway
- National Route 136
- National Route 414

== Local attractions ==
=== National Historic sites ===
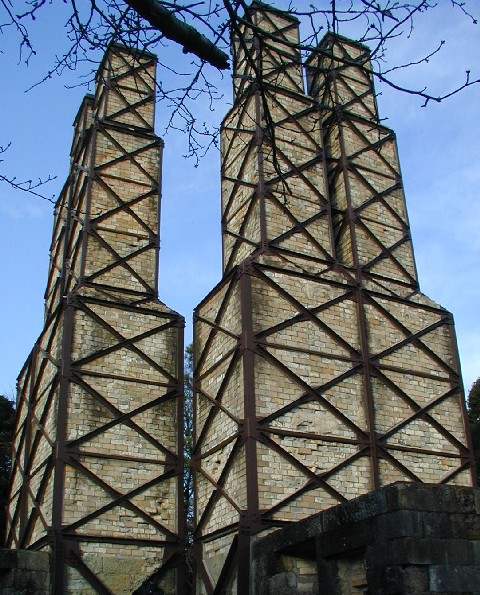
Nirayama Reverberatory Furnace site

- Nirayama Reverberatory Furnaces, a group of reverberatory furnaces for manufacturing cannon built in 1857. It was officially registered as a UNESCO World Heritage Site, as one of the constituent Sites of Japan's Meiji Industrial Revolution: Iron and Steel, Shipbuilding and Coal Mining in 2015.
- Ganjōju-in, Buddhist temple with National Treasure sculptures by Unkei
- Kitaema Cave Tomb cluster, Jomon period tomb complex
- Hōjō residence ruins
- Horigoe Gosho ruins
- Nirayama Daikansho

== Sister cities ==
- Gainesville, Georgia, United States

== Notable people from Izunokuni ==
- Sayuri Iwata - actress
- Takanobu Hozumi - actor and voice actor

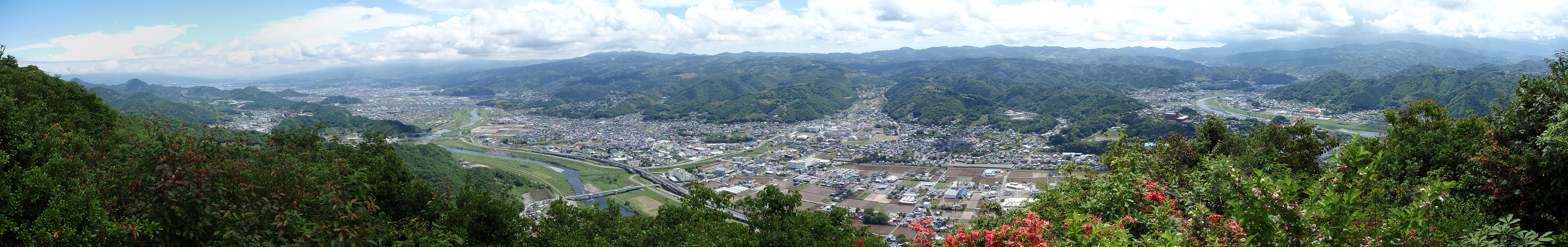
A view from top of Mount Jōyama in Izunokuni
