= Ganjōju-in =

- 願成就院
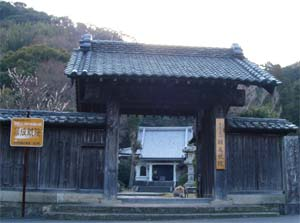
- Gate of Ganjōju-in

- Ganjōju-in Ganjōju-in (Japan)

Religion
- Affiliation: Buddhism
- Deity: Amida Nyōrai
- Rite: Kōyasan Shingon-shū

Location
- Location: 83-1 Jike, Izunokuni-shi, Shizuoka-ken 410-2122
- Country: Japan
- Interactive map of Ganjōju-in
- Coordinates: 35°02′44″N 138°56′24″E

Architecture
- Founder: Hōjō Tokimasa
- Completed: 1189 AD

Website
- ganjoujuin.jp
- National Treasure National Historic Site of Japan

Ganjōju-in (願成就院) is a Buddhist temple of the Kōyasan Shingon-shū sect in the Hike neighborhood of the city of Izunokuni, Shizuoka Prefecture, Japan. Its main image is a statue of Amida Nyōrai. The temple grounds were designated a National Historic Site on February 14, 1973. The temple is noted for a set of statues by the famed Kamakura period sculptor Unkei which are collectively designated a National Treasure of Japan.

== History ==
Ganjōju-in is located at the eastern foot of Mount Moriyama at an elevation of 100 meters along the Kano River in the Izu Peninsula. Per the Azuma Kagami, Ganjōju-in was founded in 1189 by Hōjō Tokimasa to pray for the victory of the Minamoto forces in their campaign against the Northern Fujiwara at Hiraizumi. However, the temple's famed statues by Unkei are all dated 1186, or three years before the campaign, indicating that the temple was actually intended as a bodaiji for the Hōjō clan. The temple continued to expand during the tenures of Hōjō Yoshitoki and Hōjō Yasutoki, becoming the largest and most important temple in Izu Province during the Kamakura period. However, the temple's prosperity was short-lived. During the wars of Hōjō Soun in the late Muromachi period, the temple was burned down in 1491 and although reconstructed, was burned down again by the forces of Toyotomi Hideyoshi during the 1590 Siege of Odawara. Under the Tokugawa shogunate, the temple was rebuilt in by Hōjō Ujisada (1703-1758) daimyō of Sayama Domain and the present Hondō dates from 1789, although all buildings of the temple were extensively rebuilt in 1967.

Then layout of the current temple is consistent with its description in the Azuma Kagami and per archaeological excavations conducted in 1970, the foundations of a number of structures mentioned in the Azuma Kagami but no longer existent today were located. Excavated old roof tiles and pottery shards are on display at the Nagiyama Folk Museum. The temple is about a 15-minute walk from Nirayama Station on the Izuhakone Railway Sunzu Line.

== Cultural properties ==
=== National Treasures ===
Ganjōju-in houses some of the few remaining works which can be definitely attributed to the Kamakura period sculptor Unkei: wooden images of Amida Nyorai, Bishamonten, Fudō Myōō and two attendants. Based on inscriptions found inside the sculptures, this group has been dated to 1186. Since June 19, 2013 these statues have been collectively designated a National Treasure of Japan.

- Wooden statue of seated Amida Nyorai (木造阿弥陀如来坐像) - Kamakura period (1186)
- Wooden statue of standing Bishamonten (木造毘沙門天立像) - Kamakura period (1186)
- Wooden statue of standing Fudō Myōō with two attendants (木造不動明王二童子立像) - Kamakura period (1186)

=== Shizuoka Prefecture Designated Tangible Cultural Properties ===
- Wooden statue of seated Jizō Bosatsu (木造地蔵菩薩坐像) - Kamakura period (1229-1232); The statue is 51.6 cm tall. The head and trunk are split with two pieces of wood joined together, and the base of the statue is carved out at knee height. The inscription of Kanki (1229-1232) is inscribed in red on the base of the statue, and although there are some additions, the facial expression, slightly arched posture, and seated posture suggest it is a work from the early Kamakura period. This statue was donated to Ganjōju-in by Hōjō Yasutoki on the seventh anniversary of the death of Hōjō Masako. It is said that the face of this statue resembles that of Hōjō Masako, and is therefore commonly known as "Masako Jizō".
- Wooden statue of seated Amida Nyōrai (木造阿弥陀如来坐像) - Kamakura period; The statue is 86.8 cm tall. The head and trunk are made of two pieces of wood joined together, creating a split neck, and the base of the statue is carved out at knee height in a top-bottom style. These are characteristics of works by the Unkei school from the early Kamakura period. The firmness of the face, the shape of the topknot and clothing, and the imposing volume of the body also suggest that this is a work from the early Kamakura period.

== Gallery ==
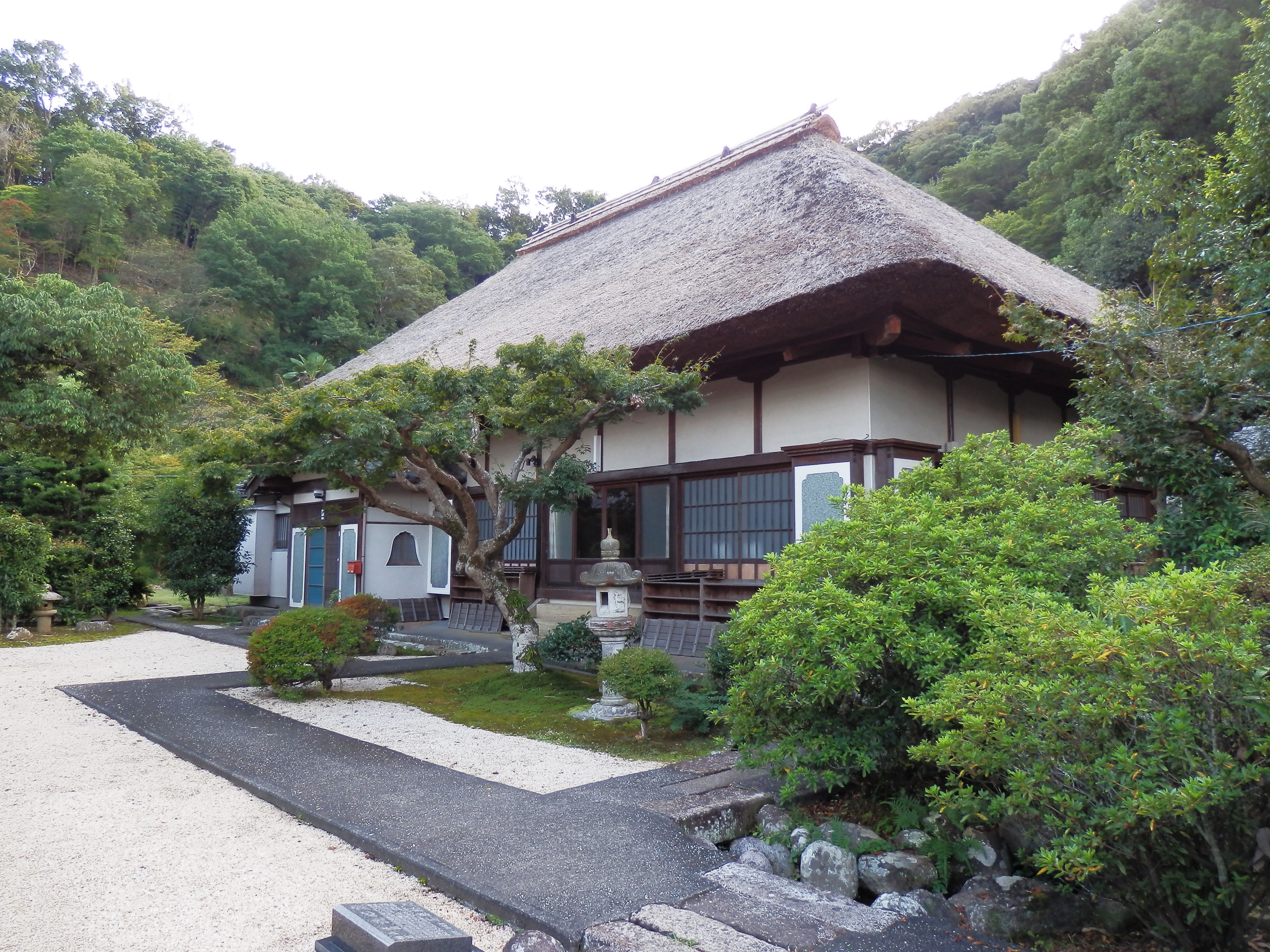
Hondō

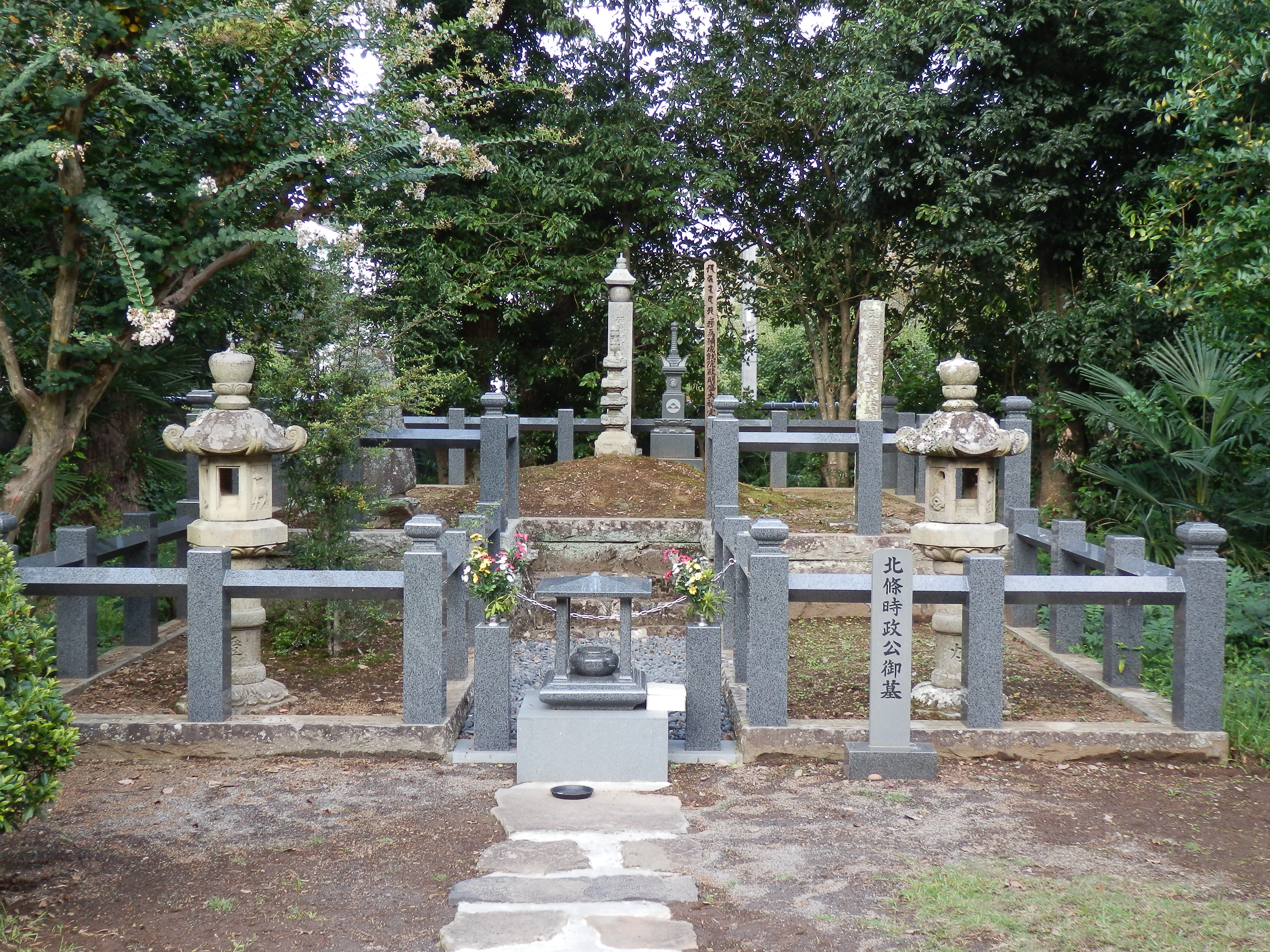
Grave of Hōjō Tokimasa

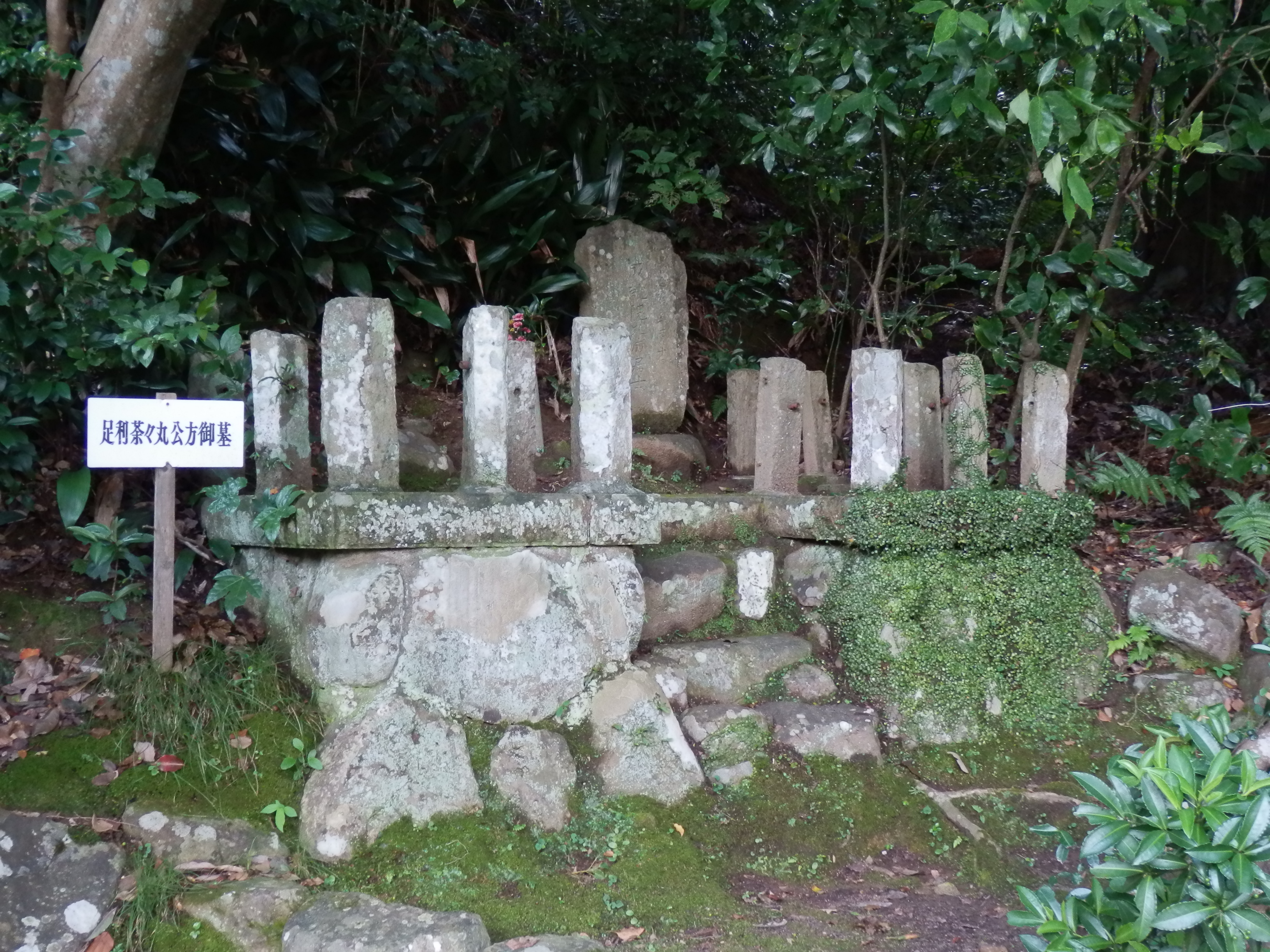
Grave of Ashikaga Chachamaru

== See also ==
- List of Historic Sites of Japan (Shizuoka)
- List of National Treasures of Japan (sculptures)
