= Kamishiroiwa ruins =

Archaeological site in Izu, Tōkai, Japan

- 上白岩遺跡 (Japanese)
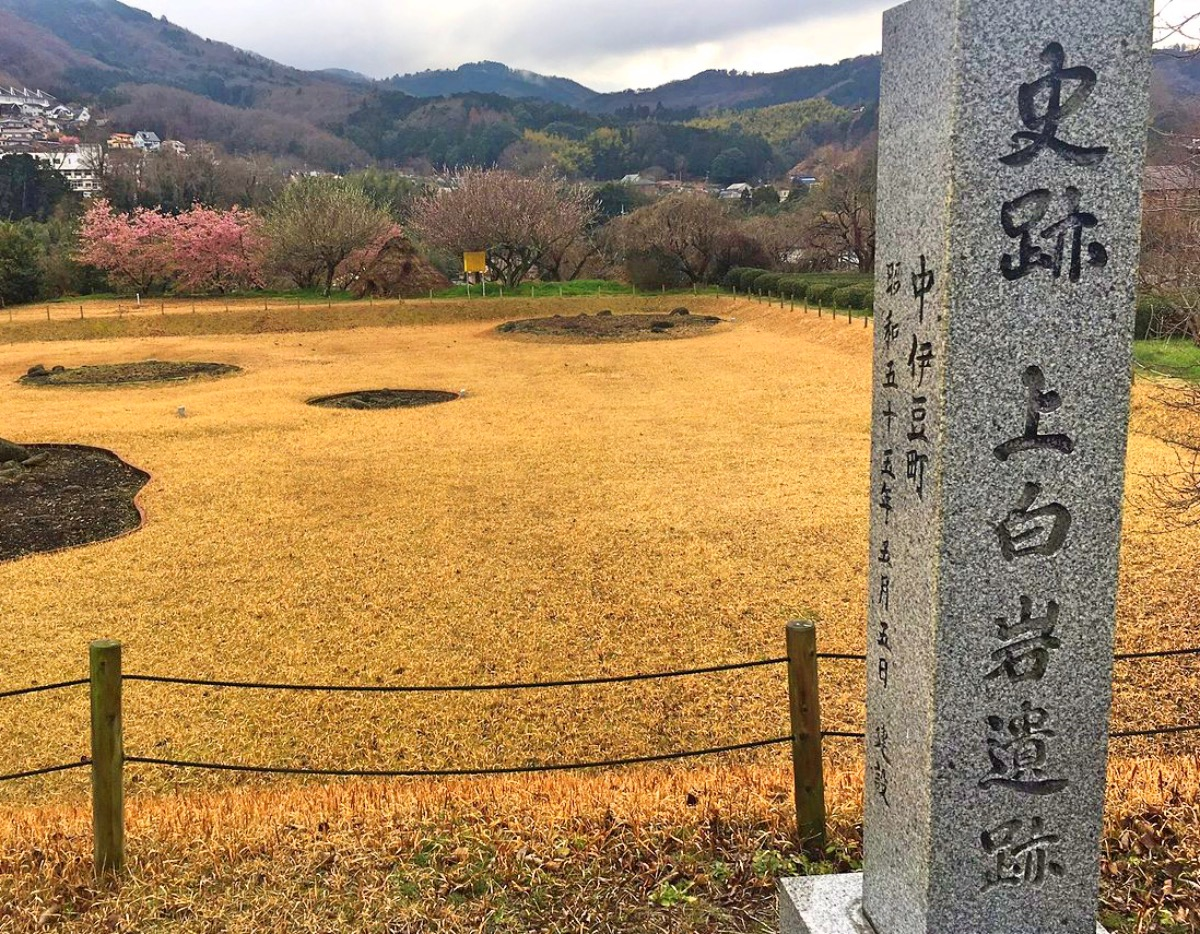
- Kamishiroiwa ruins

- Kamishiroiwa site Kamishiroiwa ruins (Japan)
- 34°57′48″N 138°59′03″E
- Type: settlement
- Periods: Jōmon period
- Location: Izu, Shizuoka, Japan
- Region: Tōkai region

Site notes
- Public access: Yes (park and museum)

The Kamishiroiwa site (上白岩遺跡, Kamishiroiwa iseki) is an archaeological site containing the ruins of a late-middle to early-late Jōmon period settlement located in the Kamishiraiwa neighborhood of the city of Izu, Shizuoka in the Tōkai region of Japan. The site was designated a National Historic Site of Japan in 1978.

== Overview ==
The Kamishiroiwa site is located on a river terrace 3.5 kilometers from the confluence of the Omi River with the Kano River and covers approximately 3 hectares. The site contained the foundations of pit dwellings from 3000 to 4000 years ago and an indeterminate number of tombs. Of note were a number of stone circles, one of which was 12 meters in diameter and contained elongated stones in its center which may once have been upright monoliths. Smooth river rocks were mostly used; however, some of the stones in the structure were polished to a flat surface. Outside of the stone circle, some 60 prehistoric storage pits were discovered, containing a large number of artifacts, mostly Jōmon pottery and stone tools. This included a clay token in the form of a human face. Some of these artifacts are now on display at the nearby Nakaizu History and Folklore Museum (中伊豆歴史民俗資料館, Nakaizu rekishi minzoku shiryōkan). The site is open to the public as a park and is located about three-minutes on foot from the "Shiraiwa" bus stop on the Nakaizu Tōkai Bus from Shuzenji Station.

== See also ==
- List of Historic Sites of Japan (Shizuoka)
