= Kannami Station =

Railway station in Kannami, Shizuoka Prefecture, Japan

CA01 Kannami Station 函南駅
- Kannami Station in October 2026

General information
- Location: Ōtake, Kannami Town, Tagata District, Shizuoka Prefecture; Japan
- Coordinates: 35°06′31″N 138°58′18″E
- Operator: JR Central
- Line: Tōkaidō Main Line
- Distance: 114.5 km (71.1 mi) from Tokyo
- Platforms: 1 island platform
- Tracks: 2

Construction
- Structure type: At grade

Other information
- Status: Staffed
- Station code: CA01
- Website: Official website

History
- Opened: 1 December 1934; 91 years ago

Passengers
- FY2017: 1,856 daily

Services
Preceding station	JR Central	Following station
Mishima CA02 towards Maibara	Tōkaidō Main Line Local	Atami CA00 Terminus
Location
- Location within Shizuoka Prefecture Location within Central Japan

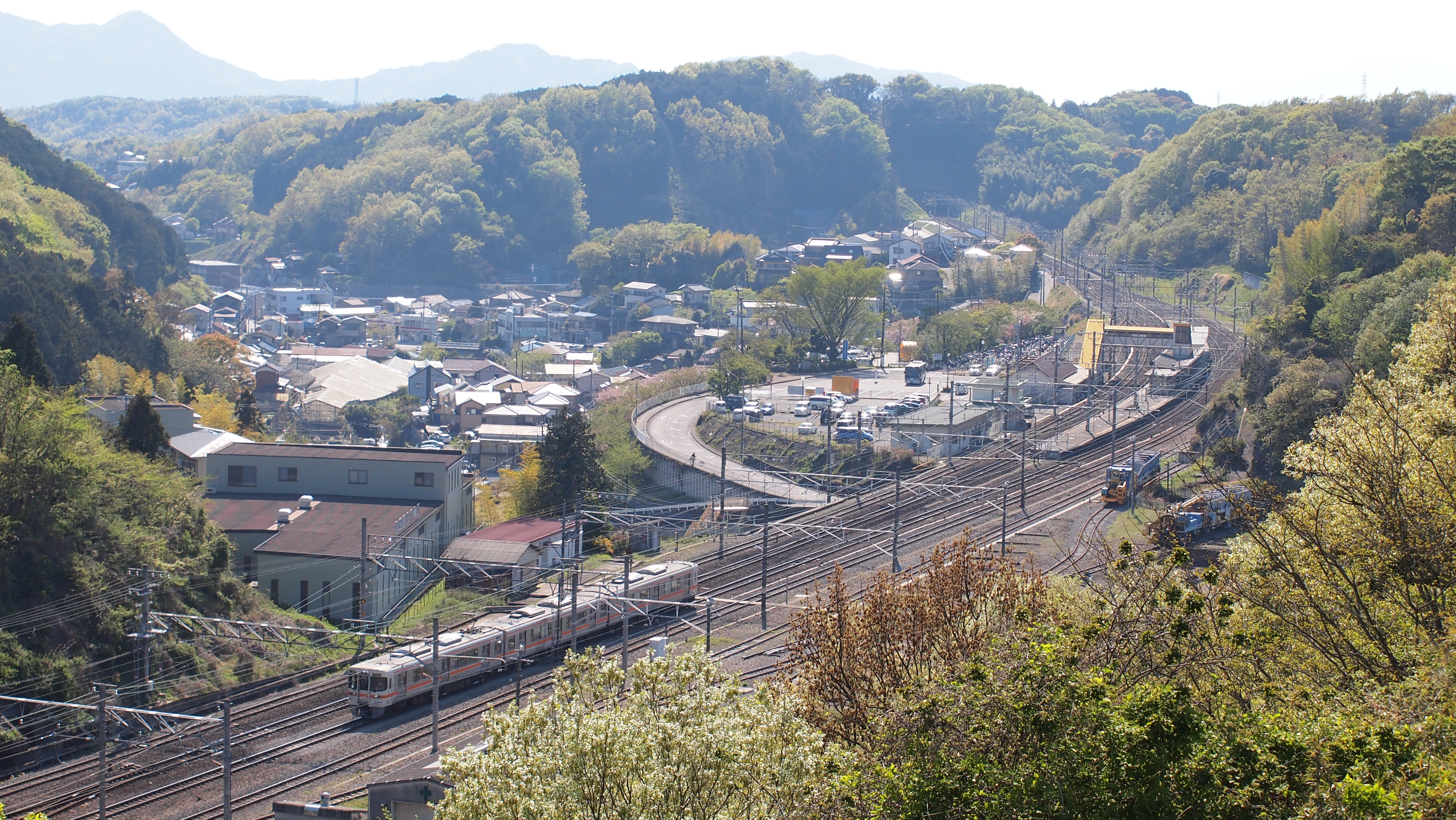
Panorama view

Kannami Station (函南駅, Kannami-eki) is a railway station in the city of Kannami, Shizuoka Prefecture, Japan, operated by Central Japan Railway Company (JR Tōkai).

== Lines ==
Kannami Station is served by the Tōkaidō Main Line, and is located 114.5 kilometers from the starting point of the line at Tokyo Station.

== Station layout ==
The station has a single Island platform serving Track 1 and Track 2, which are on passing loops with outside tracks to permit the through transit of express trains. The platform is connected to the station building by a footbridge. The station building has automated ticket machines, TOICA automated turnstiles and a staffed ticket office.

=== Platforms ===
1	■ Tōkaidō Main Line	For Mishima・Numazu・Fuji・Shizuoka・Hamamatsu
2	■ Tōkaidō Main Line	For Atami・Odawara・Yokohama・Tokyo

== Station history ==
Kannami Station was opened on December 1, 1934 when the section of the Tōkaidō Main Line connecting Atami with Numazu via the Tanna Tunnel was completed. Regularly scheduled freight service was discontinued in 1971. TOICA automated gates were installed in 2008.

Station numbering was introduced to the section of the Tōkaidō Line operated JR Central in March 2018; Kannami Station was assigned station number CA01.

== Passenger statistics ==
In fiscal 2017, the station was used by an average of 1856 passengers daily (boarding passengers only).

== Surrounding area ==
- Kannami City Hall

== See also ==
- List of railway stations in Japan
