= Atami Jinsha Tetsudo =

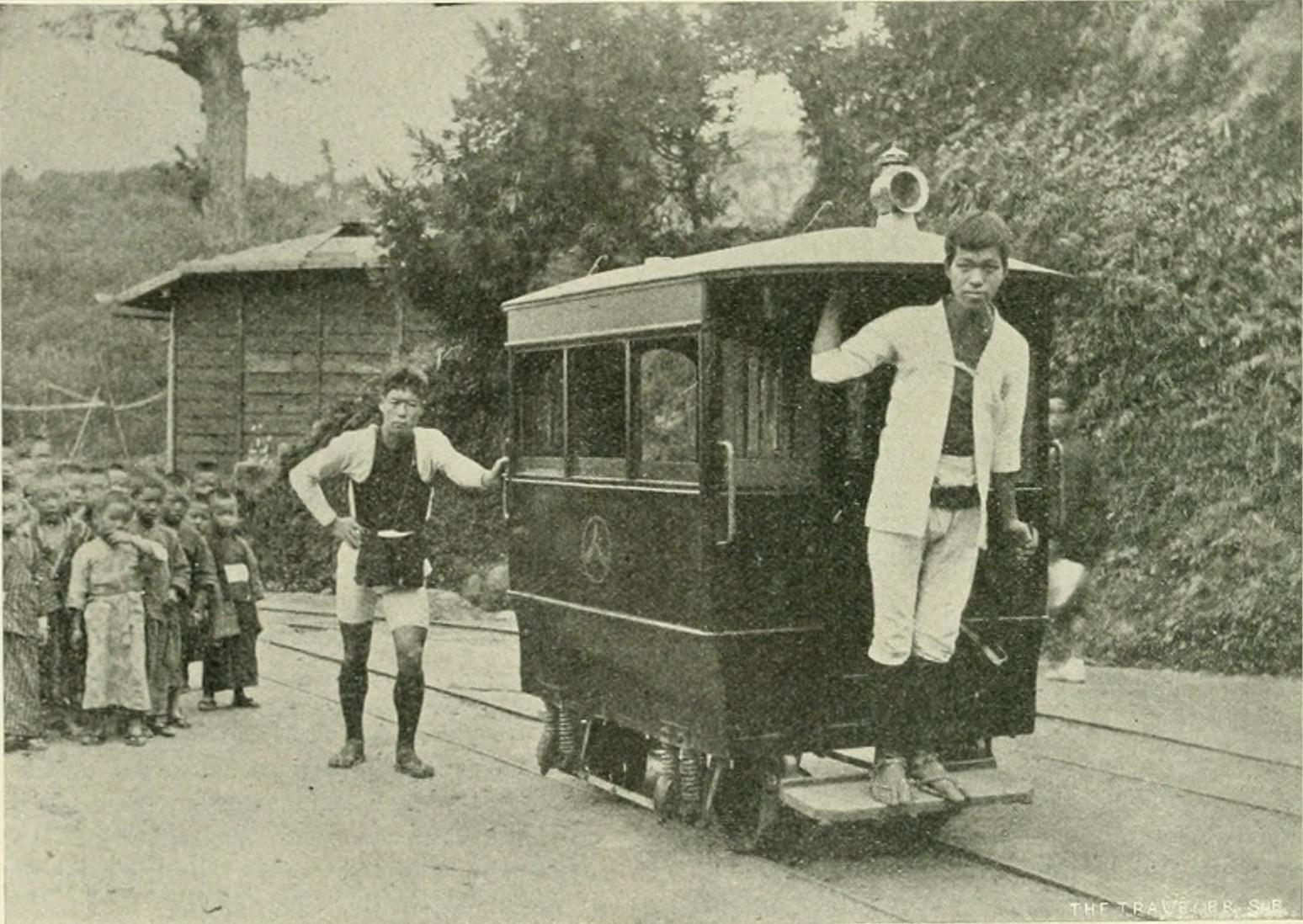
Handcar around 1900

The Atami Jinsha Tetsudo (Jap. for Atami man(powered) vehicle railway) was a 9.5 miles (15.3 km) long 2 feet (610 mm) manpowerered narrow gauge railway in the province of Izu, Japan which was operated around 1900.

The initially 7 miles (11 km) long handcar line was opened in 1895 and connected the coastal towns Atami and Yoshihama on the Izu Peninsula. The train crew comprised two men and a boy. The men, muscular coolies, pushed the car on the up-grades and jumped on the rear platform for a ride when the car was coasting on a level or down-grade. The boy rode on the front platform, and it was his duty to blow a horn as a warning at hills and curves, and to manipulate the brakes. The fare, including tips for the crew, on the road was equivalent to 21 cents per round trip. The line was expanded by 2.5 miles (4.0 km) to Odawara in 1896.

In 1907 the track was re-gauged to 3 ft 6 in (1,067 mm), and steam locomotives were introduced. The line closed in 1923 as a result of the Great Kanto earthquake.

== Photographs ==
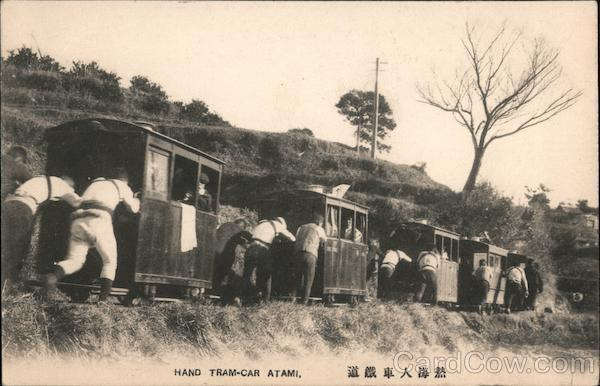
Hand Tram-Car Atami

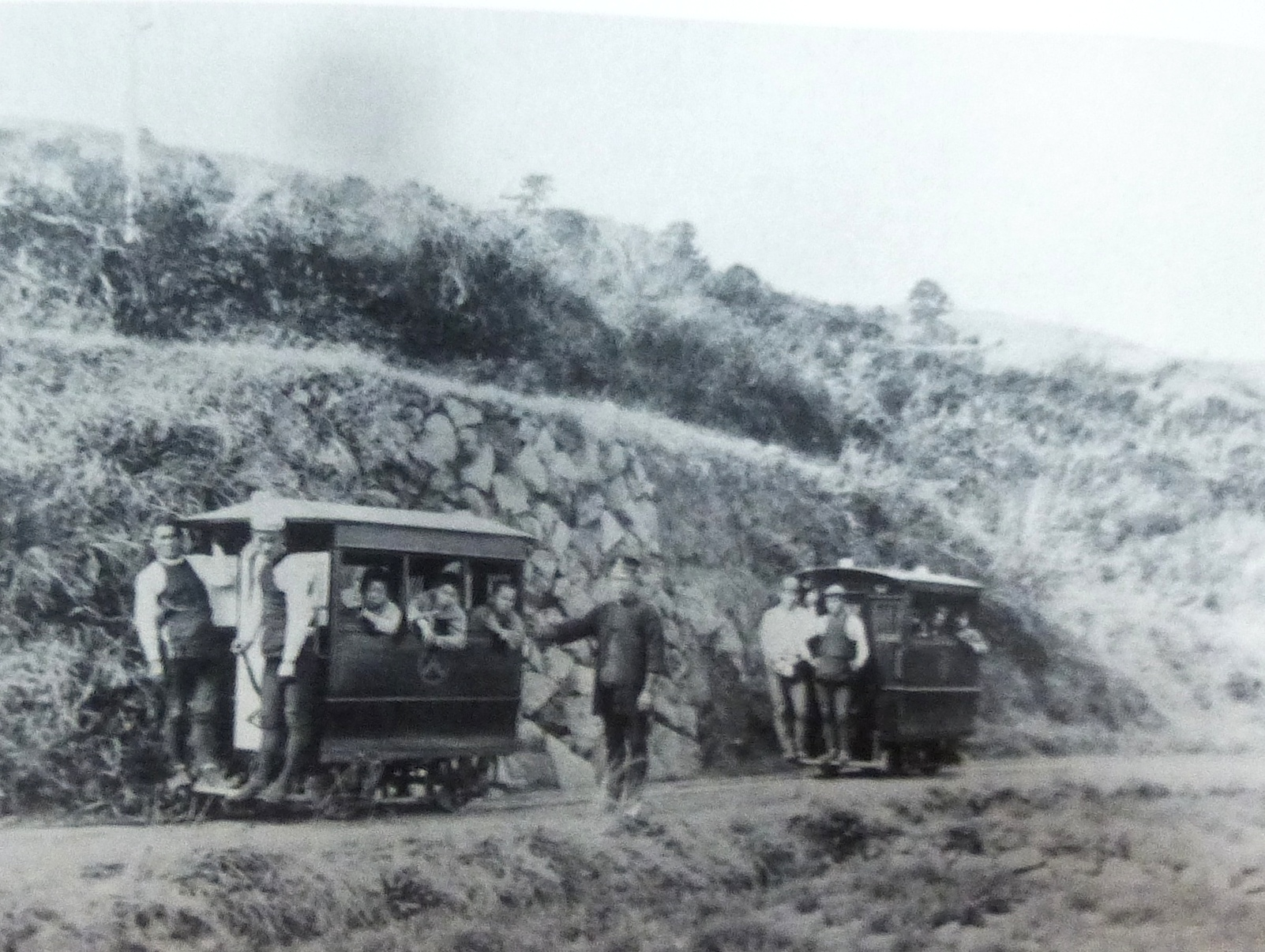
Passenger transport

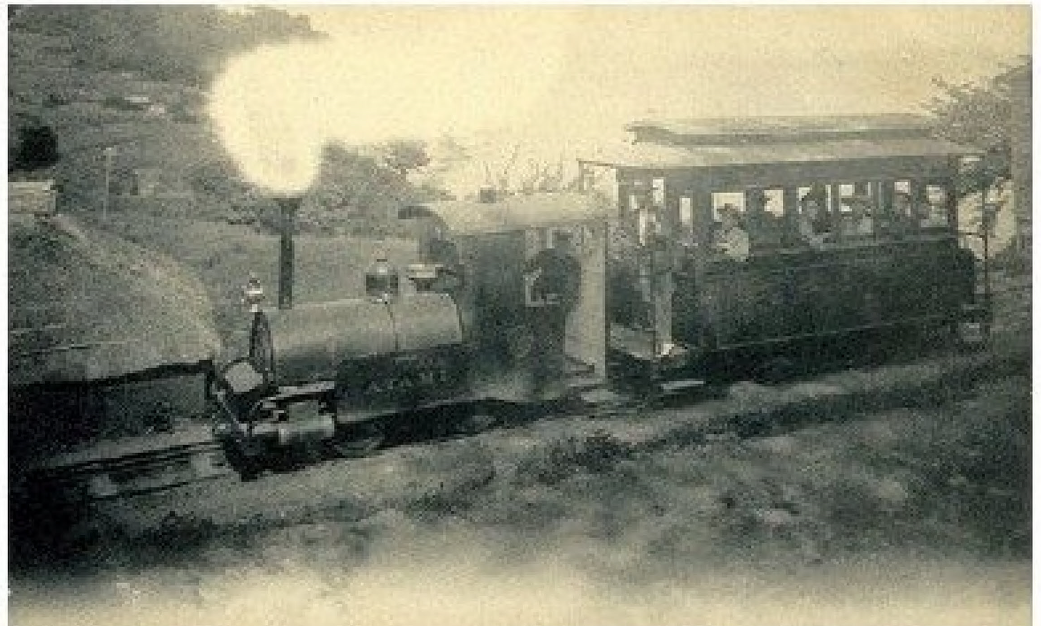
Steam locomotive No 1 after re-gauging in 1907
