= Izu, Shizuoka =

Izu 伊豆市
- City
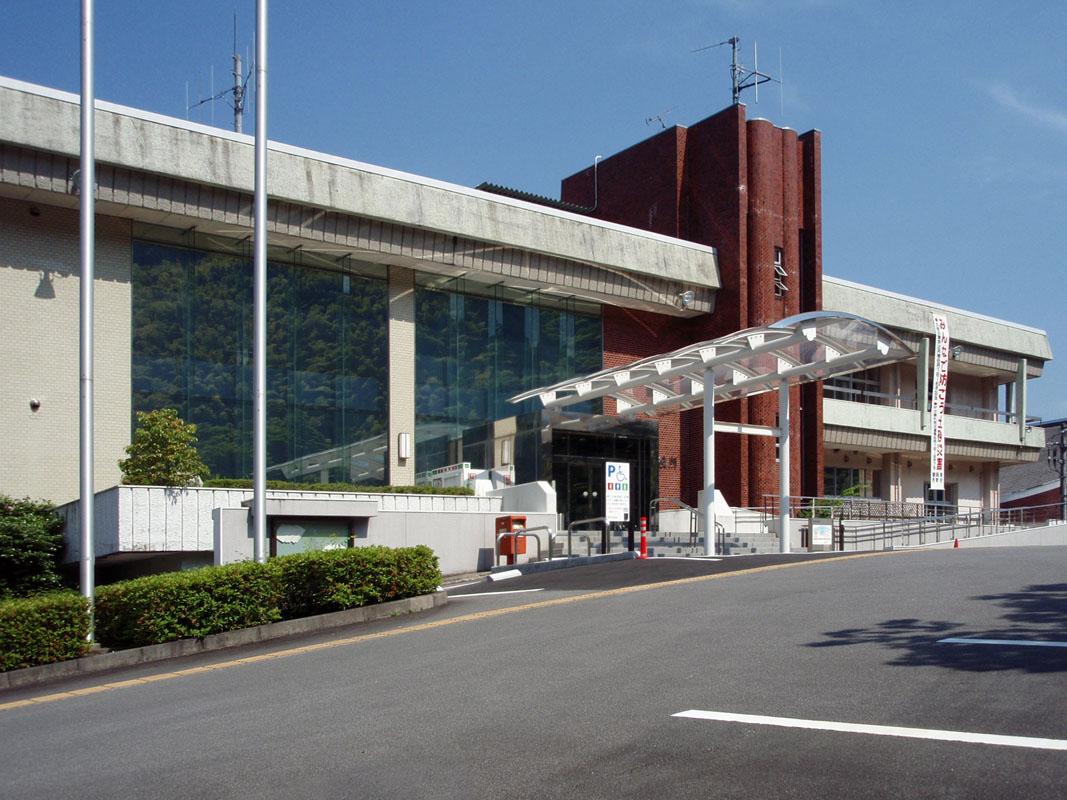
- Izu City Hall

- Flag Seal
- Interactive map of Izu
- Coordinates: 34°58′35.5″N 138°56′48.5″E
- Country: Japan
- Region: Chūbu (Tōkai)
- Prefecture: Shizuoka
- First official recorded: 680 AD
- Shuzenji town settled: August 30, 1924
- Toi town settled: April 1, 1938
- Both towns merged and city settled: April 1, 2004

Government
  - Mayor: Yutaka Kikuchi (from April 2008)

Area
  - Total: 363.97 km^{2} (140.53 sq mi)

Population (April 2019)
  - Total: 30,678
  - Density: 84.287/km^{2} (218.30/sq mi)
- Time zone: UTC+9 (Japan Standard Time)
- City symbols
  - Tree: Quercus acutissima
  - Flower: Wasabi
  - Bird: Green pheasant
- Phone number: 0558-72-1111
- Address: Kodachino 38-2, Izu-shi, Shizuoka-ken 410-2413
- Website: Official website

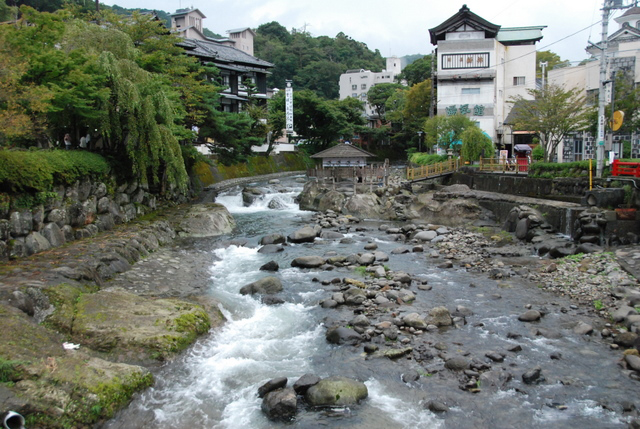
Shuzenji hot spring resort

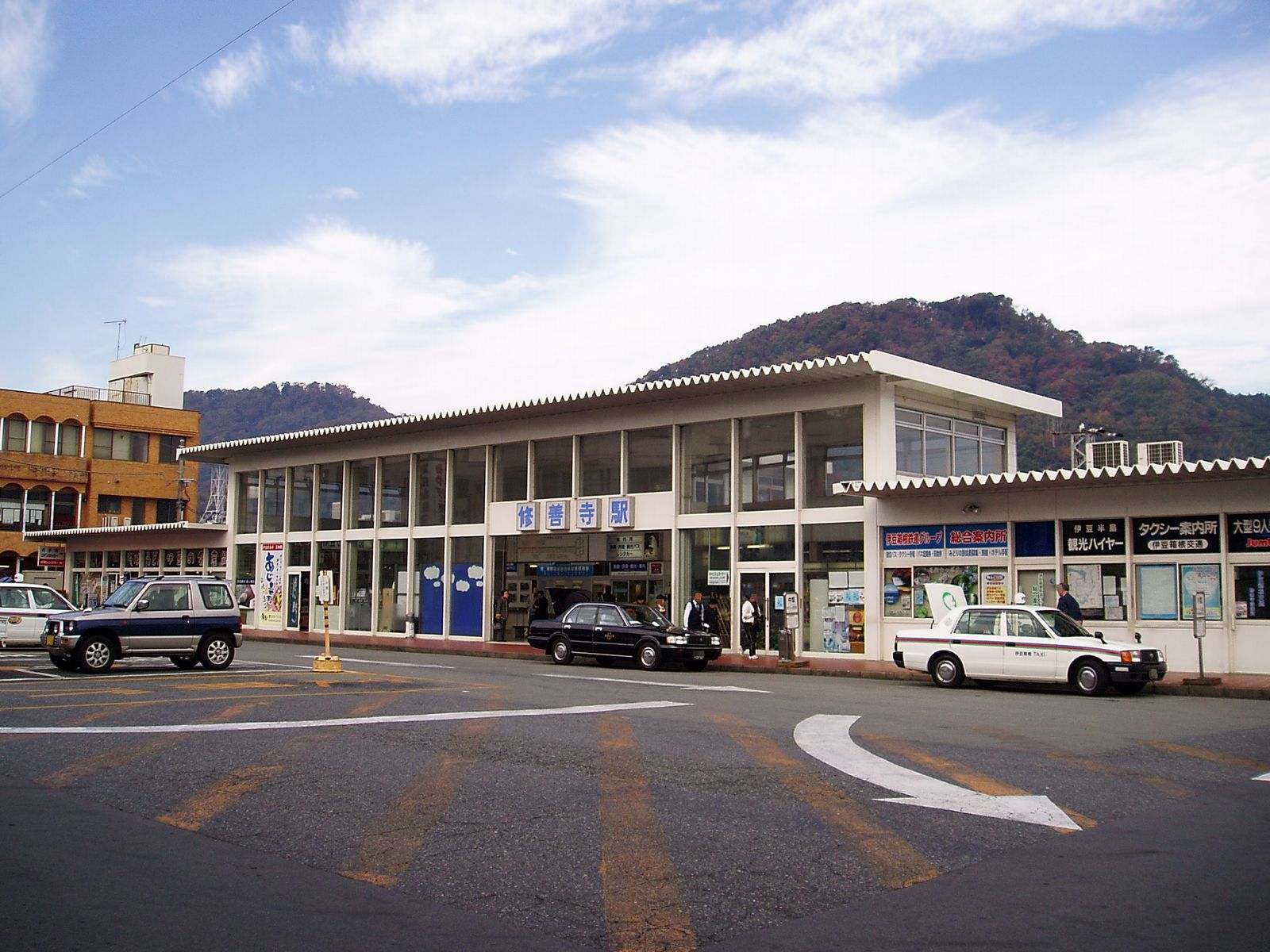
Shuzenji train station

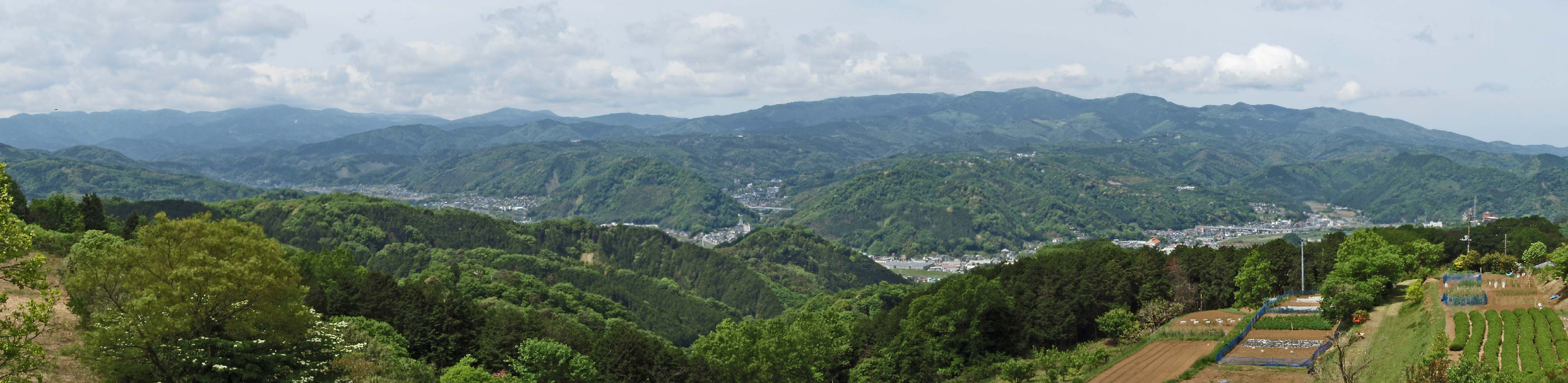
A panorama of the Izu city

Izu (伊豆市, Izu-shi; Japanese pronunciation: [ì.(d͡)zɨ́(.ɕì)]) is a city in central Izu Peninsula in Shizuoka Prefecture, Japan. As of 1 April 2019, the city had an estimated population of 30,678 in 13,390 households, and a population density of 84 persons per km^{2}. Izu has an area of 363.97 square kilometres (140.53 sq mi).

== Geography ==
Izu is in the north-central Izu Peninsula and includes most of the Amagi Mountains. The region is hilly and some 80% of the city's area is forested. The Kano River runs through Izu, which has a short coastline to the west on Suruga Bay of the Pacific Ocean. The area is part of the Izu-Tobu volcanic region, and is therefore subject to frequent earthquakes; the city has numerous hot springs as a result. Warmed by the Kuroshio Current, the area has a warm maritime climate with hot, humid summers and mild, cool winters.

=== Surrounding municipalities ===
- Shizuoka Prefecture
  - Higashiizu
  - Itō
  - Izunokuni
  - Kawazu
  - Nishiizu
  - Numazu

== Demographics ==
Per Japanese census data, Izu's population has been declining for 60 years.

Historical population
Year	Pop.	±%
1960	44,240	—
1970	40,875	−7.6%
1980	39,915	−2.3%
1990	38,999	−2.3%
2000	38,581	−1.1%
2010	34,206	−11.3%

=== Climate ===
Izu has a climate characterized by hot, humid summers and relatively mild winters (Köppen climate classification Cfa). Its average annual temperature is 15.9 °C. The average annual rainfall is 2035 mm. September is the wettest month. The temperatures are highest in August, at around 26.5 °C, and lowest in January, at around 6.3 °C.

== History ==
During the Edo period, most of Izu Province was tenryō territory under direct control of the Tokugawa shogunate, although portions near modern Shuzenji were under the control of the Ōkubo clan of Ogino-Yamanaka Domain. During the establishment of the modern municipalities system in the early Meiji period in 1889, the area was reorganized into several villages under Kimisawa District, Shizuoka Prefecture. Kimisawa District merged with Tagata District in 1896.

Shuzenji became a town in 1924, followed by Toi in 1938, Nakaizu in 1958, and Amagiyugashima in 1960. The city of Izu was established on April 1, 2004, by the merger of the towns of Shuzenji, Toi, Nakaizu, and Amagiyugashima (all from Tagata District).

== Government ==
Izu has a mayor-council form of government with a directly elected mayor and a unicameral city legislature of 16 members.

== Economy ==
Izu's economy centers on tourism—primarily hot spring resorts—farming/forestry, and commercial fishing. Izu is noted for its production of wasabi and shiitake. During the Edo period, the area was known for its production of gold and other ores; the last commercial mining operations closed in the 1960s.

== Education ==
Izu has six public elementary schools, a public middle school, and a combined elementary/middle school operated by the city government. The city has two public high schools, operated by the Shizuoka Prefectural Board of Education.

== Transportation ==
=== Railway ===
- Izuhakone Railway – Sunzu Line
  - Shuzenji–Makinokō

=== Highway ===
- Izu-Jūkan Expressway
- National Route 136
- National Route 414

== Local attractions ==
- Jōren Falls
- Kamishiroiwa ruins, Jomon period settlement trace, National Historic Site
- Shuzenji Romney Railway
- Su-Za World Sōhonzan (主座世界総本山, Suza Sekai Sōhonzan), often simply called the "Suza" (主座 / ス座). Located in Hiekawa (冷川), Izu, it is the headquarters of the Japanese new religion Sekai Mahikari Bunmei Kyodan (世界真光文明教団), officially known in English as the World Divine Light Organization (WDL).
- Toi gold mine

== Sister cities ==
- Nelson, British Columbia, Canada, since August 18, 2005
- Hope, British Columbia, Canada, since August 18, 2005
- Minamiminowa, Nagano, Japan, since February 25, 1991

== Notable people from Izu ==
- Yurina Hase (Yurika Ochiai), voice actress
- Yasushi Inoue, writer
- Sōsuke Kaise, manga artist
- Naoko Ken, singer and actress
- Hon'inbō Shūwa, professional Go player
