= Toi, Shizuoka =

Toi 土肥町
- Former municipality
- Flag Seal

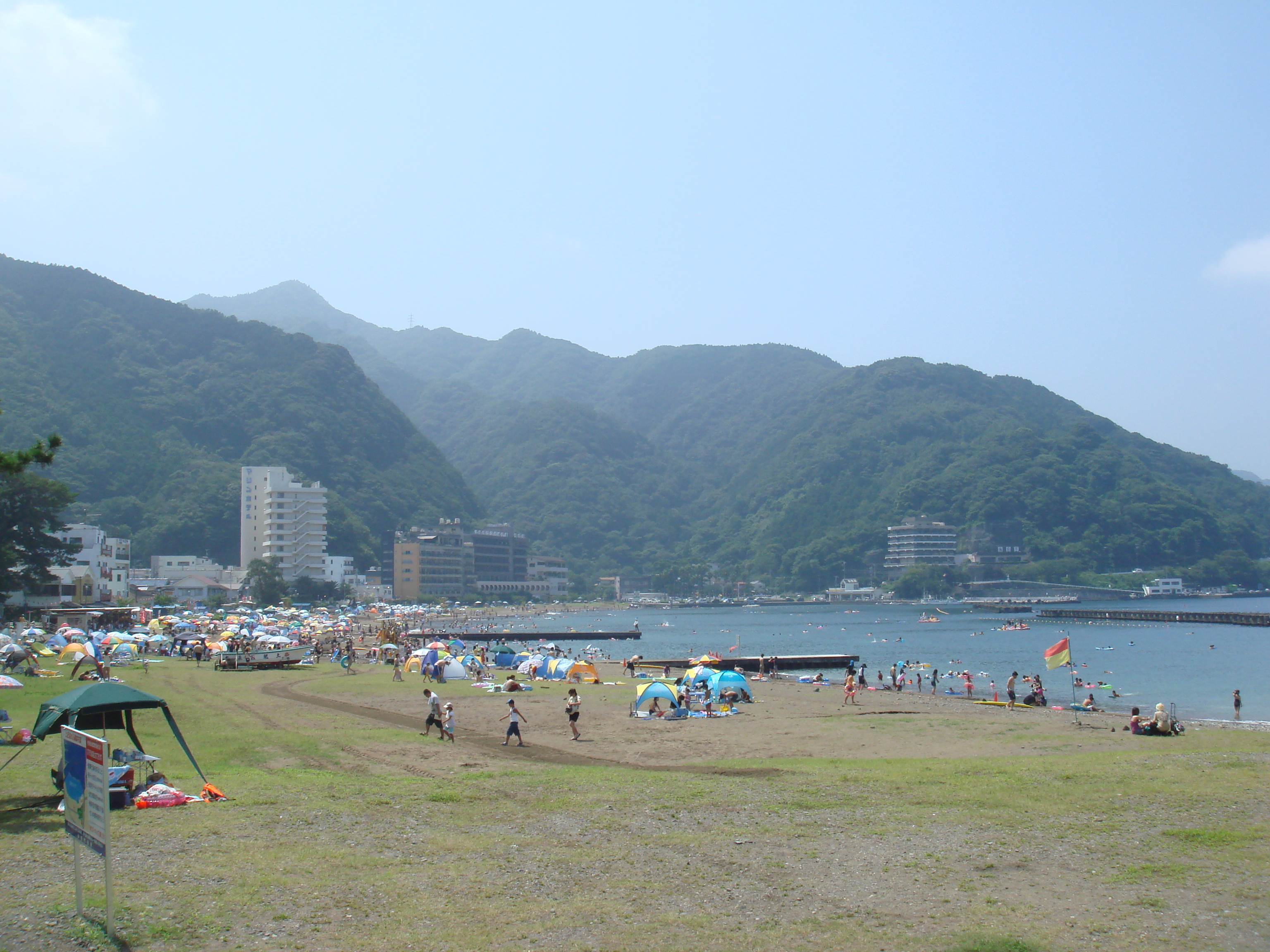
- Location of Toi in Shizuoka Prefecture

- Location in Japan
- Coordinates: 34.910758°N 138.792324°E
- Country: Japan
- Region: Chūbu (Tōkai)
- Prefecture: Shizuoka Prefecture
- District: Tagata
- Merged: April 1, 2004 (now part of Izu)

Area
  - Total: 49.41 km^{2} (19.08 sq mi)

Population (March 1, 2004)
  - Total: 5,203
  - Density: 105/km^{2} (270/sq mi)
- Time zone: UTC+09:00 (JST)

Toi (土肥町, Toi-chō) is a town located in Tagata District, Shizuoka Prefecture, Japan on the west coast of Izu Peninsula facing Suruga Bay.

As of March 1, 2004, final population data before the amalgamation, the town had an estimated population of 5,203 and a density of 105 persons per km^{2}.

On April 1, 2004, Toi, along with the towns of Amagiyugashima, Nakaizu and Shuzenji (all from Tagata District), was merged to create the city of Izu.

Toi was also home to the Toi gold mine, the second most productive gold mine in Japan after Sado, Niigata. The total area was 49.41 km^{2}. It was the location of the world's largest flower clock.
