= Nakaizu, Shizuoka =

Nakaizu 中伊豆町
- Former municipality
- Flag Seal

- Location in Japan
- Coordinates: 34°56′57″N 138°59′48″E
- Country: Japan
- Region: Chūbu (Tōkai)
- Prefecture: Shizuoka Prefecture
- District: Tagata
- Merged: April 1, 2004 (now part of Izu)

Area
  - Total: 102.02 km^{2} (39.39 sq mi)

Population (March 1, 2005)
  - Total: 8,457
  - Density: 77/km^{2} (200/sq mi)
- Time zone: UTC+09:00 (JST)

Nakaizu (中伊豆町, Nakaizu-chō) was a town located in Tagata District, Shizuoka Prefecture, Japan, in central Izu Peninsula.

As of March 1, 2004, final population data before the amalgamation, the town had an estimated population of 8,457 and a density of 77.03 persons per km^{2}. The total area was 110.02 km^{2}.

On April 1, 2004, Nakaizu, along with the towns of Amagiyugashima, Shuzenji and Toi (all from Tagata District), was merged to create the city of Izu.

Nakaizu, located in the Izu-Kogen highlands of central Izu Peninsula was noted for its production of wasabi and shiitake.
