= Izunagaoka, Shizuoka =

Izunagaoka 伊豆長岡町
- Former municipality
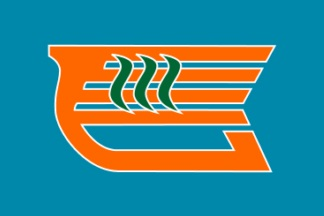
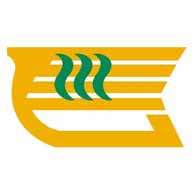
- Flag Emblem

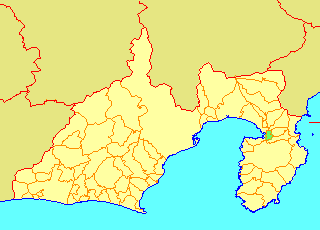
- Location of Izunagaoka in Shizuoka Prefecture

- Location in Japan
- Coordinates: 35.0399°N 138.9475°E
- Country: Japan
- Region: Chūbu (Tōkai)
- Prefecture: Shizuoka Prefecture
- District: Tagata
- Merged: April 1, 2005 (now part of Izunokuni)

Area
  - Total: 16.52 km^{2} (6.38 sq mi)

Population (April 1, 2005)
  - Total: 15,339
  - Density: 928.5/km^{2} (2,405/sq mi)
- Time zone: UTC+09:00 (JST)
- Symbols
- Bird: Japanese white-eye
- Flower: Iris
- Tree: Osmanthus

Izunagaoka (伊豆長岡町, Izu-Nagaoka-chō) was a town located in Tagata District, Shizuoka Prefecture, Japan in northern Izu Peninsula.

As of March 1, 2005, the town had an estimated population of 15,339 and a density of 928.5 persons per km^{2}. The total area was 16.52 km^{2}. The town was served by a station on the Izuhakone Railway.

On April 1, 2005, Izunagaoka, along with the towns of Nirayama and Ōhito (all from Tagata District), was merged to create the city of Izunokuni and thus it no longer exists as an independent municipality.

Izu-Nagaoka was established on April 1, 1889 as Kawanishi Village. It was renamed Izunagaoka Town on November 3, 1934.
