= Shuzenji, Shizuoka =

Shuzenji 修善寺町
- Former municipality
- Flag Seal

- Location in Japan
- Coordinates: 34.971662°N 138.930394°E
- Country: Japan
- Region: Chūbu (Tōkai)
- Prefecture: Shizuoka Prefecture
- District: Tagata
- Merged: April 1, 2004 (now part of Izu)

Area
  - Total: 69.4 km^{2} (26.8 sq mi)

Population (March 1, 2005)
  - Total: 16,328
  - Density: 236.5/km^{2} (613/sq mi)
- Time zone: UTC+09:00 (JST)

Shuzenji (修善寺町, Shuzenji-chō) was a town located in Tagata District, Shizuoka Prefecture, Japan, in central Izu Peninsula.

As of March 1, 2004, final population data before the amalgamation, the town had an estimated population of 16,328 and a density of 236.5 persons per km^{2}. The total area was 69.04 km^{2}.

On April 1, 2004 Shuzenji, along with the towns of Amagiyugashima, Nakaizu and Toi (all from Tagata District), was merged to create the city of Izu.

Shuzenji was located in an inland region of Izu Peninsula and was noted for its numerous onsen hot spring resorts. The area was also noted for its production of wasabi and shiitake.

The town of Shuzenji was founded on April 1, 1889 within Kimisawa District, Shizuoka. In 1896, Kimisawa District was abolished and became part of Tagata District.
