= Izu-Jūkan Expressway =

Road in Shizuoka prefecture, Japan

Izu-Jūkan Expressway
- 伊豆縦貫自動車道

Route information
- Maintained by Ministry of Land, Infrastructure, Transport and Tourism
- Length: 57.3 km (35.6 mi)
- Existed: 1992–present

Major junctions
- North end: Numazu Interchange; AH1 Tōmei Expressway in Numazu
- South end: Tsukigase Interchange; National Route 136 in Izu

Location
- Country: Japan

Highway system
- National highways of Japan; Expressways of Japan

The Izu-Jūkan Expressway (伊豆縦貫自動車道, Izu-Jūkan Jidōsha-dō) is an incomplete two-lane national expressway in Shizuoka Prefecture. It is owned and operated primarily by the Ministry of Land, Infrastructure, Transport and Tourism (MLIT), but has a short section maintained and tolled by the Central Nippon Expressway Company at its northern terminus with the Tōmei Expressway. The route is signed E70 under MLIT's "2016 Proposal for Realization of Expressway Numbering."

== Route description ==
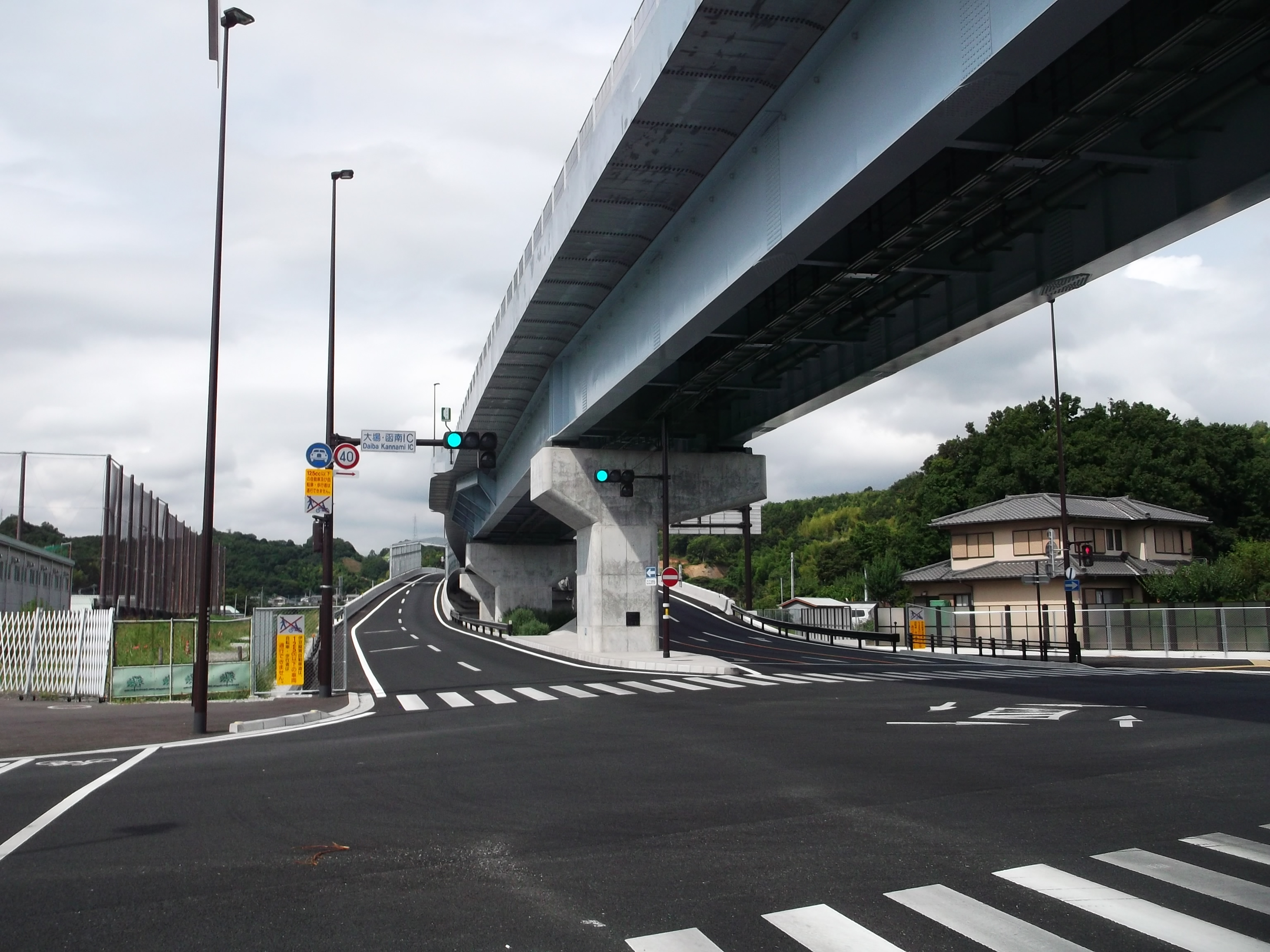
The Izu-Jūkan Expressway at Daiba-Kannami Interchange in Mishima.

As of February 2019, the expressway exists as two separate sections that are linked by the Izu Chuodo and Shuzenji Road. These roads are tolled by the Shizuoka Prefecture Road Corporation. Shuzenji Road is officially a branch line of the Izu-Jūkan Expressway while Izu Chuodo is not. The northern section links the Tōmei Expressway and nearby Shin-Tōmei Expressway to Kannami to the southeast. In Kannami, the road ends, leading to the Izu Chuodo. When completed the main line of the expressway will bypass the toll roads, running to the east of them. The southern section of the expressway begins at a junction with the Shuzenji Road in the northern part of the city of Izu and travels south, parallel to Japan National Route 136. The expressway has a junction with Route 136 near the center of Izu after tunneling through the hills around the city. This junction, Tsukigase Interchange, currently serves as the southern terminus of the expressway.

== History ==
The Izu-Jūkan Expressway was first opened as a 2.2-kilometer-long (1.4 mi) section of expressway on 19 September 1992 between Kumasaka and Shuzenji interchanges. Since then it has been expanded in stages, with the most recent expansion being a 5.1-kilometer-long (3.2 mi) section opened on 26 January 2019 between Ōdai and Tsukigase interchanges.

== See also ==
- Izu Chuodo
- Shuzenji Road
