= Jōren Falls =

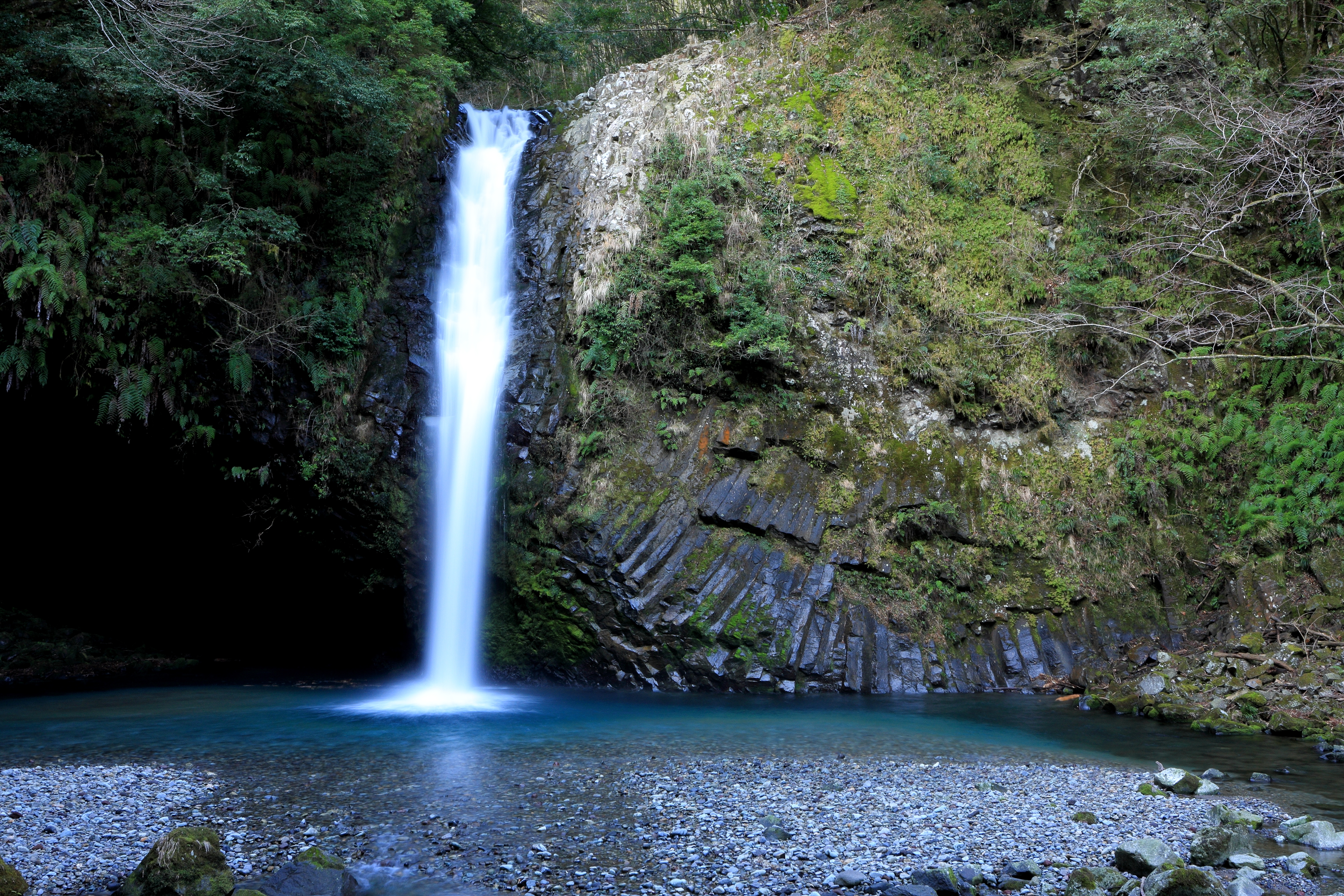

- Location within Shizuoka Prefecture Location within Japan
- Location: Izu, Shizuoka, Japan
- Coordinates: 34.871807°N 138.922144°E
- Type: block
- Total height: 25 m (82 ft)
- Average width: 7 m (23 ft)
- Watercourse: Kano River

Jōren Falls (浄蓮の滝, Jōren-no-taki) is a waterfall in the Yugashima district of Izu city, Shizuoka Prefecture, Japan, in central Izu Peninsula, in the upper reaches of the Kano River. It is a Shizuoka Prefectural Natural Monument. It is one of "Japan’s Top 100 Waterfalls", in a listing published by the Japanese Ministry of the Environment in 1990.

According to Japanese folklore, Jōren Falls is home to the jorōgumo, a spider that can transform into a seductive woman.

== See also ==
- List of waterfalls
- List of waterfalls in Japan
