= Amagiyugashima, Shizuoka =

Amagiyugashima 天城湯ヶ島町
- Former municipality
- Flag Emblem

- Location in Japan
- Coordinates: 34°54′05″N 138°55′32″E
- Country: Japan
- Region: Chūbu (Tōkai)
- Prefecture: Shizuoka Prefecture
- District: Tagata
- Merged: October 11, 2005 (now part of Izu)

Area
  - Total: 135.14 km^{2} (52.18 sq mi)

Population (March 1, 2004)
  - Total: 7,677
  - Density: 135.14/km^{2} (350.0/sq mi)
- Time zone: UTC+09:00 (JST)

Amagiyugashima (天城湯ヶ島町, Amagiyugashima-chō) was a town located in Tagata District, Shizuoka Prefecture, Japan.

As of March 1, 2004, final population data before the amalgamation, the town had an estimated population of 7,677 and a density of 56.8 persons per km^{2}. The total area was 135.14 km^{2}.

On April 1, 2004, Amagiyugashima, along with the towns of Nakaizu, Shuzenji and Toi (all from Tagata District), was merged to create the city of Izu.

Amagiyugashima was noted for its production of wasabi. It was also the location of the Amagi Tunnel, a tourist attraction based on a famous scene in Yasunari Kawabata's novel The Dancing Girl of Izu.
