= Ōhito, Shizuoka =

Ōhito 大仁町
- Former municipality
- Flag Seal
- Interactive map of Ōhito
- Country: Japan
- Region: Chūbu (Tōkai)
- Prefecture: Shizuoka Prefecture
- District: Tagata
- Merged: April 1, 2005 (now part of Izunokuni)

Area
  - Total: 43.56 km^{2} (16.82 sq mi)

Population (April 1, 2005)
  - Total: 15,169
  - Density: 348/km^{2} (900/sq mi)
- Time zone: UTC+09:00 (JST)

Ōhito (大仁町, Ōhito-chō) was a town located in Tagata District, Shizuoka Prefecture, Japan in central Izu Peninsula.

== Population ==
As of March 1, 2005, the town had an estimated population of 15,169 and a density of 348 persons per km^{2}. The total area was 43.56 km^{2}. The town has a station on the Izuhakone Railway.

== History ==
On April 1, 2005, Ōhito, along with the towns of Izunagaoka and Nirayama (all from Tagata District), was merged to create the city of Izunokuni and thus it no longer exists as an independent municipality.

== See also ==
- Ohito Declaration
