= Nirayama Station =

Railway station in Izunokuni, Shizuoka Prefecture, Japan

Nirayama Station 韮山駅
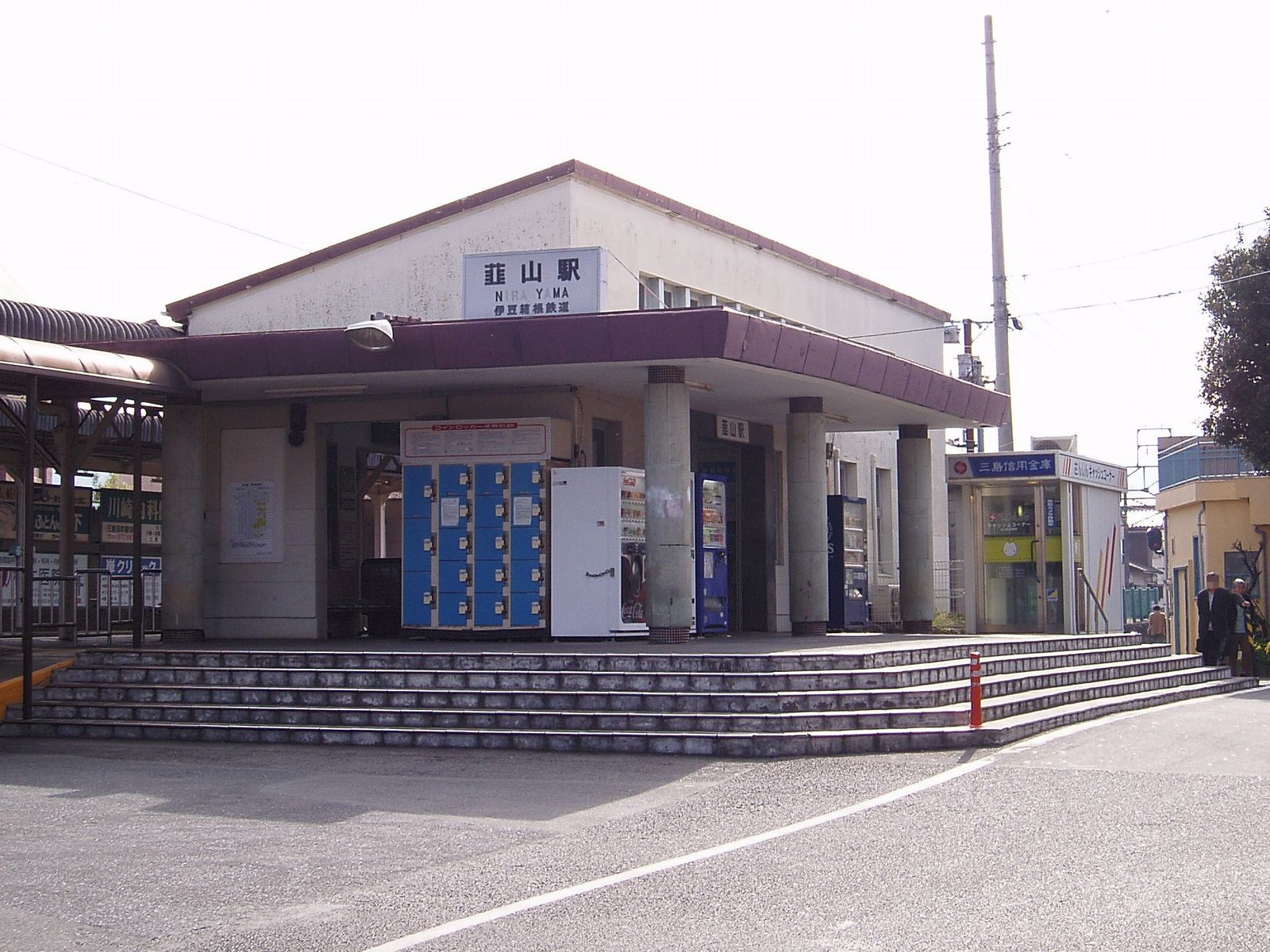
- Nirayama Station in November 2007

General information
- Location: Yokkamachi, Izunokuni City, Shizuoka Prefecture; Japan
- Coordinates: 35°03′11.76″N 138°56′43.44″E
- Operator: Izuhakone Railway
- Line: Sunzu Line
- Distance: 9.8 km (6.1 mi) from Mishima
- Platforms: 2 side platforms'
- Tracks: 2

Construction
- Structure type: At grade

Other information
- Status: Unstaffed
- Station code: IS08
- Website: Official website

History
- Opened: 5 August 1900; 126 years ago
- Former names: Hōjō (to 1919)

Passengers
- FY2017: 1,466 daily

Services
Preceding station	Izuhakone Railway	Following station
Izu-Nagaoka towards Shuzenji	Sunzu Line Local	Baraki towards Mishima
Location
- Location within Shizuoka Prefecture Location within Central Japan Location within Japan

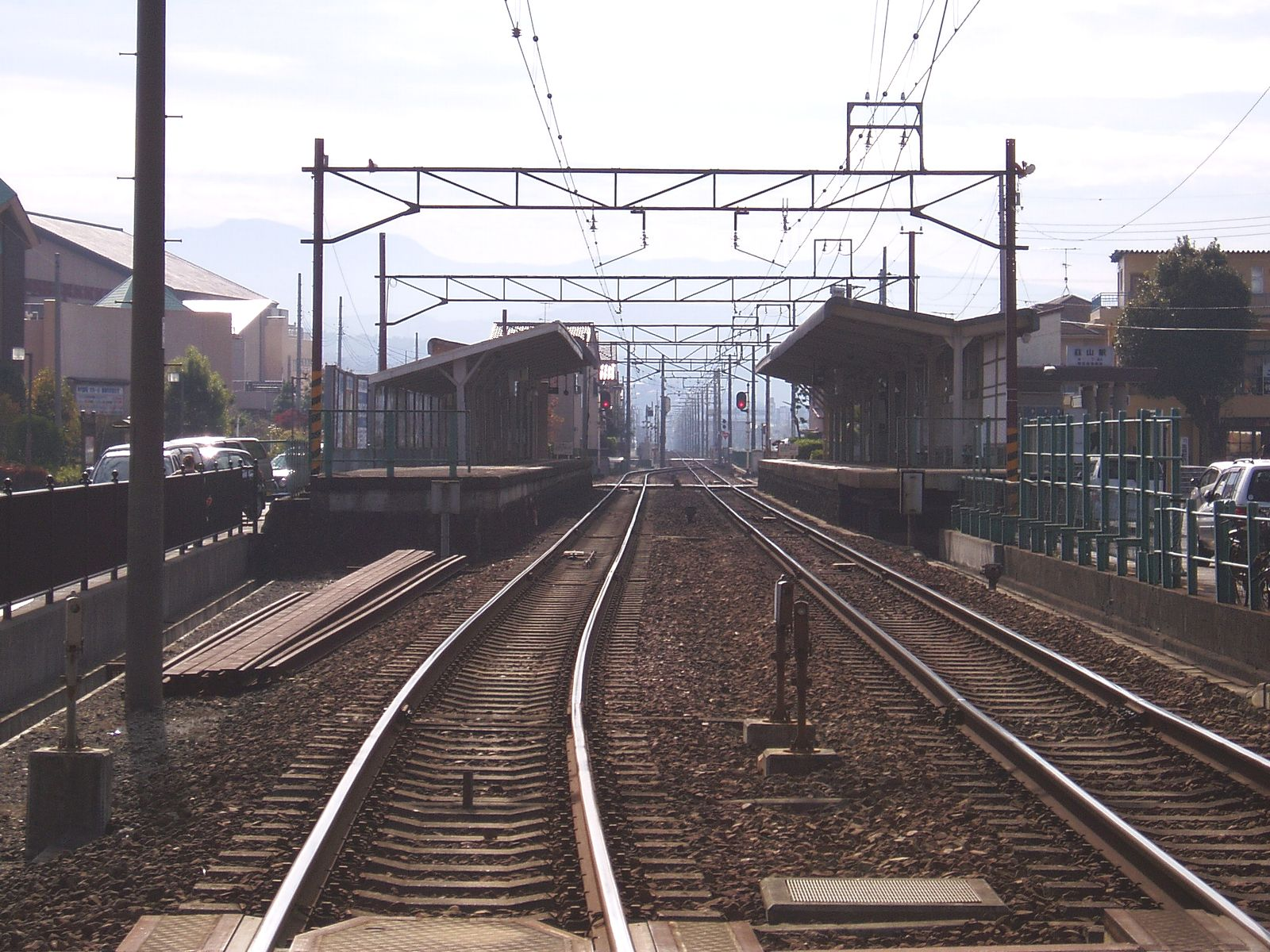
Platforms

Nirayama Station (韮山駅, Nirayama-eki) is a railway station located in the city of Izunokuni, Shizuoka Prefecture, Japan operated by the private railroad company Izuhakone Railway. It is located in the former town of Nirayama.

== Lines ==
Nirayama Station is served by the Sunzu Line, and is located 9.8 kilometers from the starting point of the line at Mishima Station.

== Station layout ==
The station has two opposed side platforms connected to the station building by a level crossing. Platform 2 is the primary platform, and is used for bidirectional traffic. Platform 1 is in occasional use only. The station building is unattended and has automatic ticket machines.

=== Platforms ===
1	■ Sunzu Line	For Izu-Nagaoka, Ōhito and Shuzenji
2	■ Sunzu Line	For Izu-Nagaoka, Ōhito and Shuzenji
2	■ Sunzu Line	For Daiba and Mishima

== History ==
Nirayama Station was opened on 5 August 1900 as Hōjō Station (北条駅, Hōjō-eki). It was given its present name on 25 May 1919.

== Passenger statistics ==
In fiscal 2017, the station was used by an average of 1466 passengers daily (boarding passengers only).

== Surrounding area ==
- Nirayama Town Hall
- Nirayama High School
- Nirayama Castle
- Nirayama Reverberatory Furnace

== See also ==
- List of railway stations in Japan
