= Jiken =

Jiken, the Japanese word for "incident", may refer to:

- The Incident (1978 film), a Japanese film
- Jiken series, a Japanese mystery novel series
- Jiken (Japanese term), a page about the word itself.
