= Tagata District, Shizuoka =

District in Japan

Coordinates: 35°07′10″N 138°56′10″E

Tagata District (田方郡, Tagata-gun) is a rural district located in Shizuoka Prefecture, Japan. As of July 2012, the district has an estimated population of 38,332 and a population density of 589 inhabitants per square kilometre (1,530/sq mi). The total area is 65.13 square kilometres (25.15 square miles). The district's administrative centre is the city hall at Mishima City.

== Towns and villages ==
Tagata District currently is composed of one town. The city of Atami and parts of the cities of Mishima, Izunokuni and Itō were formerly part of the district.

- Kannami

== History ==
Tagata District was one of the original districts of Izu Province, having been separated from Suruga Province in the cadastral reform of 680 AD, and covered most of central Izu Peninsula.

Modern Tagata District was established in the July 22, 1878 cadastral reforms initiated by the Meiji government with one town (Nirayama) and 61 villages. In a round of consolidation on April 1, 1889, this was reduced to seven villages, with Nirayama reduced to village status. However, on April 4, 1896, the area of the district was greatly expanded by portions of the former Kimisawa District and Kamo District, to have two towns (Mishima and Atami) and 27 villages.

Itō was raised to town status on January 1, 1906. In 1924, Ajiro and Shuzenji were also raised to town status, followed by Izunagaoka in 1936. Atami was elevated to city status on April 10, 1937. The village of Toi was elevated to town status on April 1, 1938, followed by Ōhito on December 10, 1940. Mishima was elevated to city status on April 29, 1941, and Itō on August 10, 1947.

On September 30, 1956, Shimokarino Village was merged into Shuzenji Town and Seizu Village merged into Toi Town. On April 1, 1957, Ajiro Town was merged into Atami City.

On January 1, 1958 the villages of Shimoomi, Nakaomi, and Kamiomi merged to form the town of Nakaizu, with parts of Kitakarino Village merging separately with Shuzenji Town and Ōhito Town on April 10, 1959.

On November 1, 1960, the villages of Nakakarino and Kamikarino merged to form the town of Amagiyugashima. Nirayama Village was elevated back to town status on April 1, 1962. Kannami Village was elevated to town status on April 1, 1963. On April 1, 2004, the towns of Shuzenji, Amagiyugashima, Nakaizu, and Toi merged to form the city of Izu. This was followed by the merger of the towns of Nirayama, Izunagaoka, and Ōhito to form the city of Izunokuni on April 1, 2005. The village of Heda merged into Numazu City on the same day.
