= Daikansho =

A daikansho (代官所) was the office of a daikan (magistrate) during the Edo period (18th & 19th century) of Japanese history.
