= Nirayama, Shizuoka =

Nirayama 韮山町
- Former municipality
- Flag Seal

- Location in Japan
- Coordinates: 35.05326°N 138.94552°E
- Country: Japan
- Region: Chūbu (Tōkai)
- Prefecture: Shizuoka Prefecture
- District: Tagata
- Merged: April 1, 2005 (now part of Izunokuni)

Area
  - Total: 34.63 km^{2} (13.37 sq mi)

Population (March 1, 2005)
  - Total: 19,602
  - Density: 566/km^{2} (1,470/sq mi)
- Time zone: UTC+09:00 (JST)

Nirayama (韮山町, Nirayama-chō) was a town located in Tagata District, Shizuoka Prefecture, Japan.

As of March 1, 2005, the town had an estimated population of 19,602 and a density of 566 persons per km^{2}. The total area was 34.63 km^{2}.

On April 1, 2005, Nirayama, along with the towns of Izunagaoka and Ōhito (all from Tagata District), was merged to create the city of Izunokuni and thus it no longer exists as an independent municipality.

During the Kamakura and Muromachi period, Niirayama was the site of a castle belonging to the Hōjō clan, and the later Hōjō clan. During the Edo period, it was the location of the daikansho offices of the Tokugawa shogunate controlling Izu Province.

Known for its strawberry crop, Nirayama sees many visitors from bigger cities (such as Tokyo) coming for seasonal picking and the views of Mount Fuji.
