= Japan National Route 136 =

National highway in Japan

National Route 136
- 国道136号
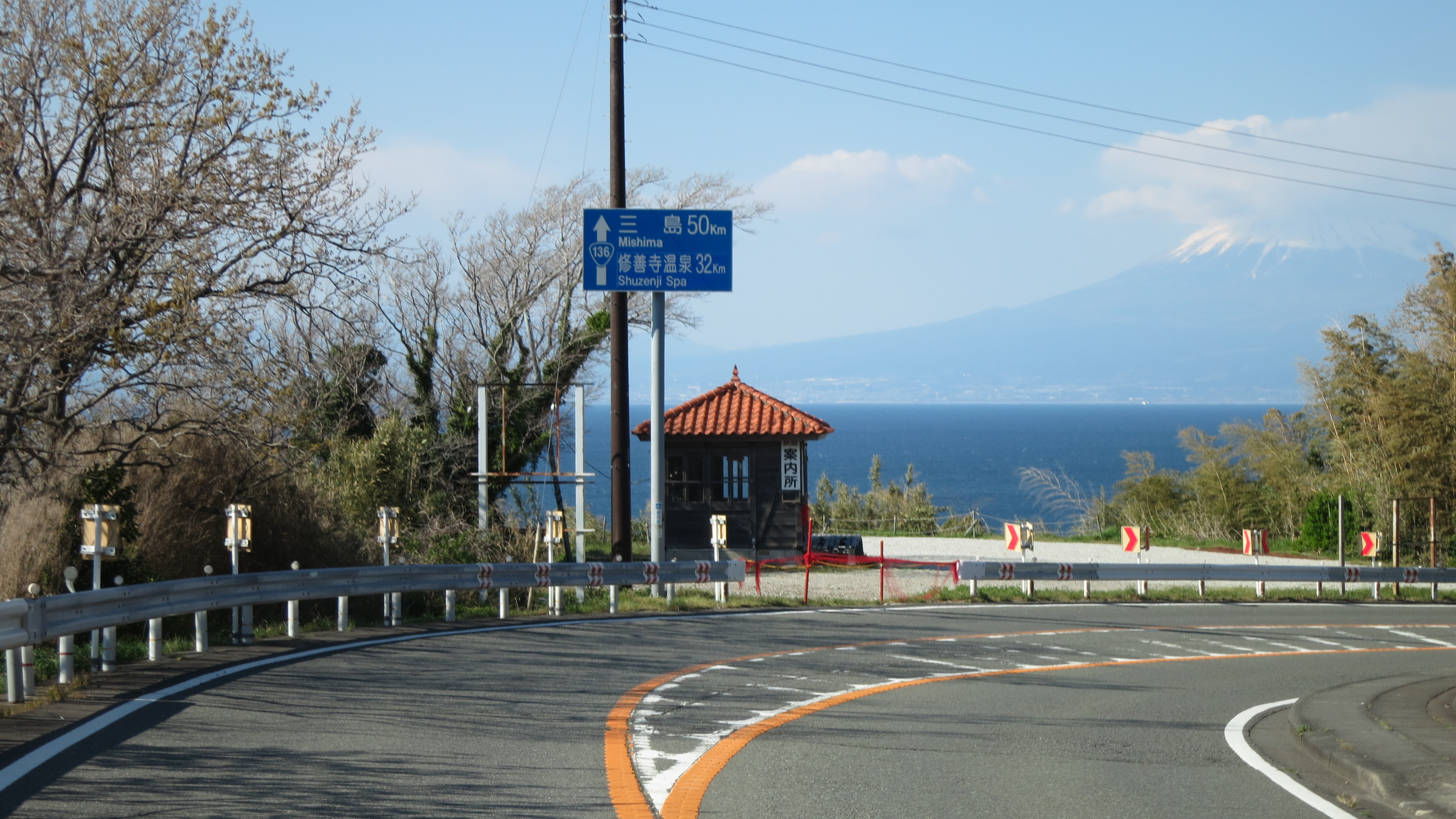

Route information
- Length: 111.3 km (69.2 mi)
- Existed: 1953–present

Major junctions
- South end: National Route 135 / National Route 414 in Shimoda, Shizuoka
- North end: National Route 1 in Mishima, Shizuoka

Location
- Country: Japan

Highway system
- National highways of Japan; Expressways of Japan
← National Route 135	→ National Route 137

National Route 136 is a national highway of Japan connecting Shimoda, Shizuoka and Mishima, Shizuoka in Japan, with a total length of 111.3 km (69.16 mi).
