= Kano River =

Coordinates: 35°04′47″N 138°51′17″E

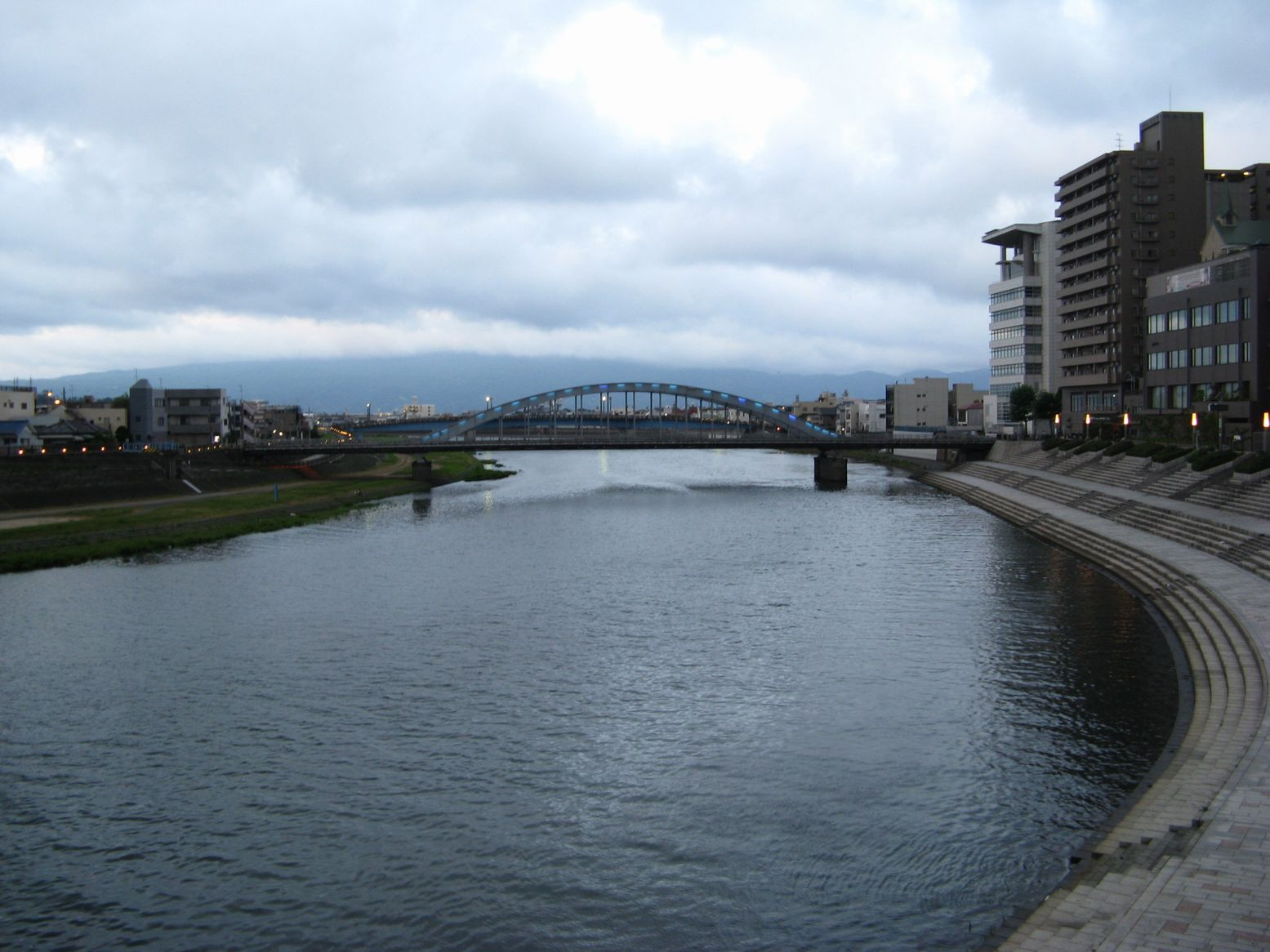
- Kano River at Numazu

- Native name: 狩野川 (Japanese)

Location
- Country: Japan

Physical characteristics
- Source
  - location: Amagi Mountains
  - elevation: 2,000 m (6,600 ft)
- Mouth
  - location: Suruga Bay
  - elevation: 0 m (0 ft)
- Length: 46 km (29 mi)
- Basin size: 853 km^{2} (329 sq mi)
- Discharge
  - average: 17.88 m^{3}/s (631 cu ft/s)

The Kano River (狩野川, Kano-gawa) is an A class river in Shizuoka Prefecture of central Japan. It is 46 kilometres (29 mi) long and has a watershed of 853 square kilometres (329 sq mi).

The Kano River originates from Mount Amagi in central Izu Peninsula and follows a generally northern path into Suruga Bay at Numazu. The Izu Peninsula is characterized by heavy rainfall, and the Kano River has a steep gradient with rapid flow and is prone to flooding. During Typhoon Ida in September 1958, the river caused heavy damage to towns along its banks, resulting in 1,269 deaths. 15 kilometres (9.3 mi) upriver from the river's mouth at Numazu, a flood diversion canal has been constructed to divert flood water into Suruga Bay. The canal is 2.9 kilometres (1.8 mi) in length with 200 metres (660 ft) and 850 metres (2,790 ft) long sets of triple tunnels.

The Jōren Falls, one of Japan's Top 100 Waterfalls with its 25-metre (82 ft) drop, is located in Yugashima district of Izu city, in the upper reaches of the Kano River.
