= Izu Province =

Former province of Japan

Map of Japanese provinces (1868) with Izu Province highlighted

Izu Province (伊豆国, Izu no Kuni; Japanese pronunciation: [ì.(d͡)zɨ́ (nó̞ kɯ̈́.ɲ̟í), í.(d͡)zɨ̀ (nò̞ kɯ̈̀.ɲ̟ì)]) was a province of Japan in the area now part of Shizuoka Prefecture and Tokyo. Izu bordered on Sagami and Suruga Provinces. Its abbreviated form name was Zushū (豆州).

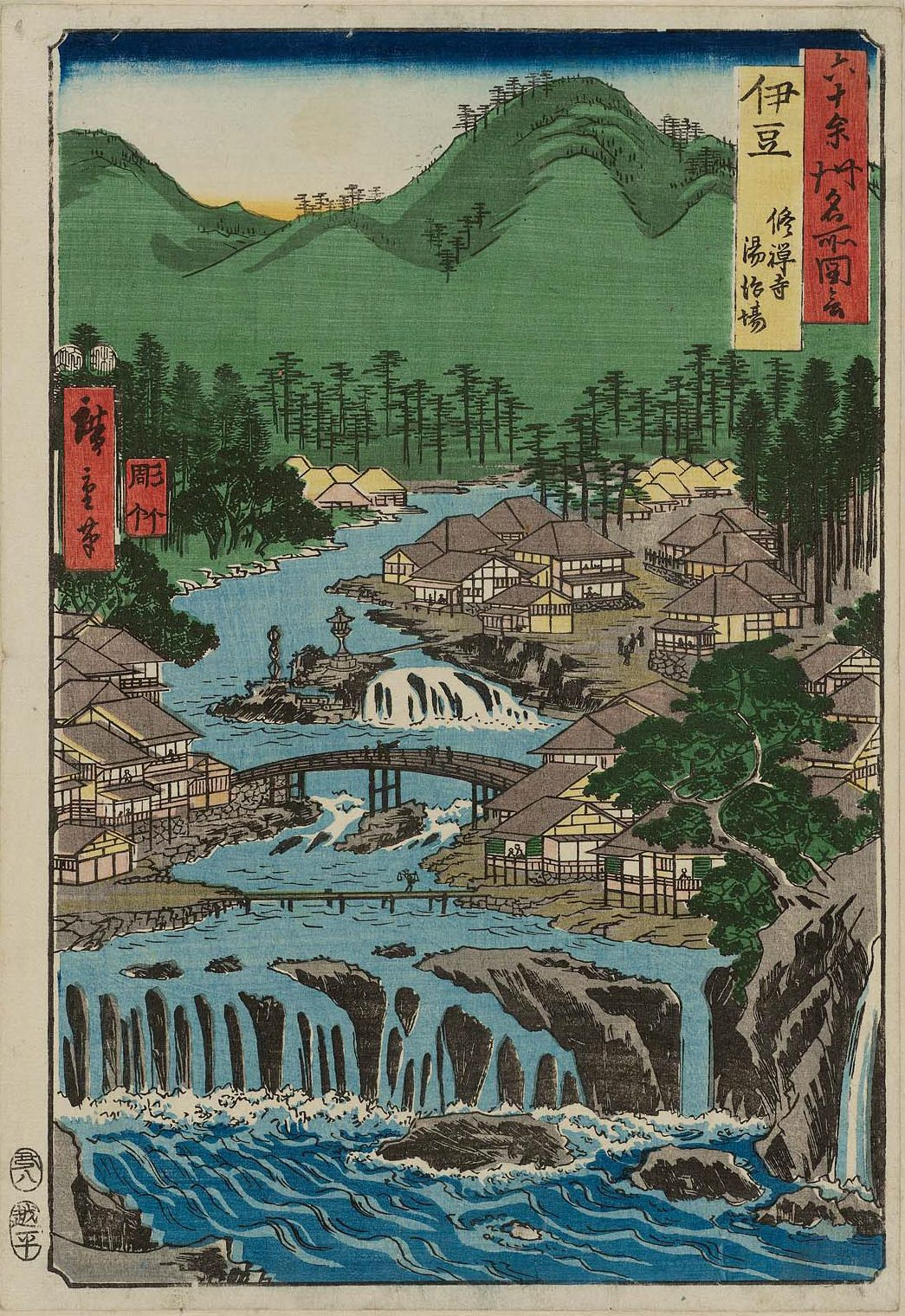
Hiroshige ukiyo-e "Izu" in "The Famous Scenes of the Sixty States" (六十余州名所図会), depicting Shuzen-ji

The mainland portion of Izu Province, comprising the Izu Peninsula, is today the eastern portion of Shizuoka Prefecture and the Izu Islands are now part of Tokyo.

== History ==
In 680 A.D., two districts of Suruga Province, Tagata District and Kamo District, were separated into the new Izu Province. At some point between the year 701 and 710, Naka District was added. The capital of the new province was established at Mishima, which also had the Kokubun-ji and the Ichinomiya (Mishima Taisha) of the province. Under the Engishiki classification system, Izu was ranked as a "lesser country" (下国). Under the ritsuryō legal system, Izu was one of the preferred locations for exile for those convicted of political crimes by the Heian period court.

In the Kamakura period, Izu was ruled by the Hōjō clan. During the Muromachi period, Izu was ruled nominally by the Uesugi clan due to their position as Kantō Kanrei; however, in reality, Izu came under the domination of whoever ruled the Kantō provinces of Sagami and Musashi. By the Sengoku period, this was the Later Hōjō clan based in Odawara. After the Battle of Odawara, Toyotomi Hideyoshi changed the fief of Tokugawa Ieyasu from his domains in the Tōkai region for the Kantō region instead, and Izu was one of the provinces that came under Tokugawa rule. After the establishment of the Tokugawa shogunate, Izu remained as a tenryō territory administered directly by the Shōgun. Much of the province was ruled by a daikan established in Nirayama, although portions were assigned to various hatamoto and to Odawara Domain. During the Edo period, Kimisawa District was added to the three ancient districts of Izu.

During the Edo period, the Tōkaidō road from Edo to Kyoto passed through northern Izu, with a post station at Mishima-shuku. The port of Shimoda at the southern end of Izu was a required port-of-call for all vessels approaching Edo from the east.

During the Bakumatsu period, Shimoda was chosen by the Tokugawa government as a port to be opened to American trade under the conditions of the Convention of Kanagawa, negotiated by Commodore Matthew Perry and signed on March 31, 1854. Shimoda was also the site of Yoshida Shōin's unsuccessful attempt to board Perry's "Black Ships" in 1854. The first American Consulate in Japan was opened at the temple of Gyokusen-ji in Shimoda under Consul General Townsend Harris. Harris negotiated the Treaty of Amity and Commerce between the two countries, which was signed at nearby Ryōsen-ji in 1858. Japan's relations with Imperial Russia were also negotiated in Shimoda, and in 1855 the Treaty of Shimoda was signed at Chōraku-ji.

After the start of the Meiji period, the districts of Naka and Kimisawa were merged with Kamo District, and Izu Province was merged into the short-lived Ashigaru Prefecture in 1871. Ashigaru Prefecture was divided between Shizuoka Prefecture and Kanagawa Prefecture on April 18, 1876, and the Izu Islands were subsequently transferred from Shizuoka Prefecture to Tokyo in 1878.

== Historical districts ==
Izu Province consisted of four districts:

- Shizuoka Prefecture
  - Kamo District (賀茂郡) – absorbed Naka District to become an expanded Kamo District; but lost parts to former Tagata District to become an expanded Tagata District on April 1, 1896
  - Kimisawa District (君沢郡) – merged with Naka and parts of original Kamo Districts into former Tagata District to become an expanded Tagata District on April 1, 1896
  - Naka District (那賀郡) – merged into remaining parts of original Kamo District to become an expanded Kamo District on April 1, 1896
  - Tagata District (田方郡) – absorbed Kimisawa, Naka and parts of Kamo Districts into former Tagata District to become an expanded Tagata District on April 1, 1896

== Highways ==
- Tōkaidō – connecting Edo to Kyoto
