= Mishima-Tamachi Station =

Railway station in Mishima, Shizuoka Prefecture, Japan

Mishima-Tamachi Station 三島田町駅
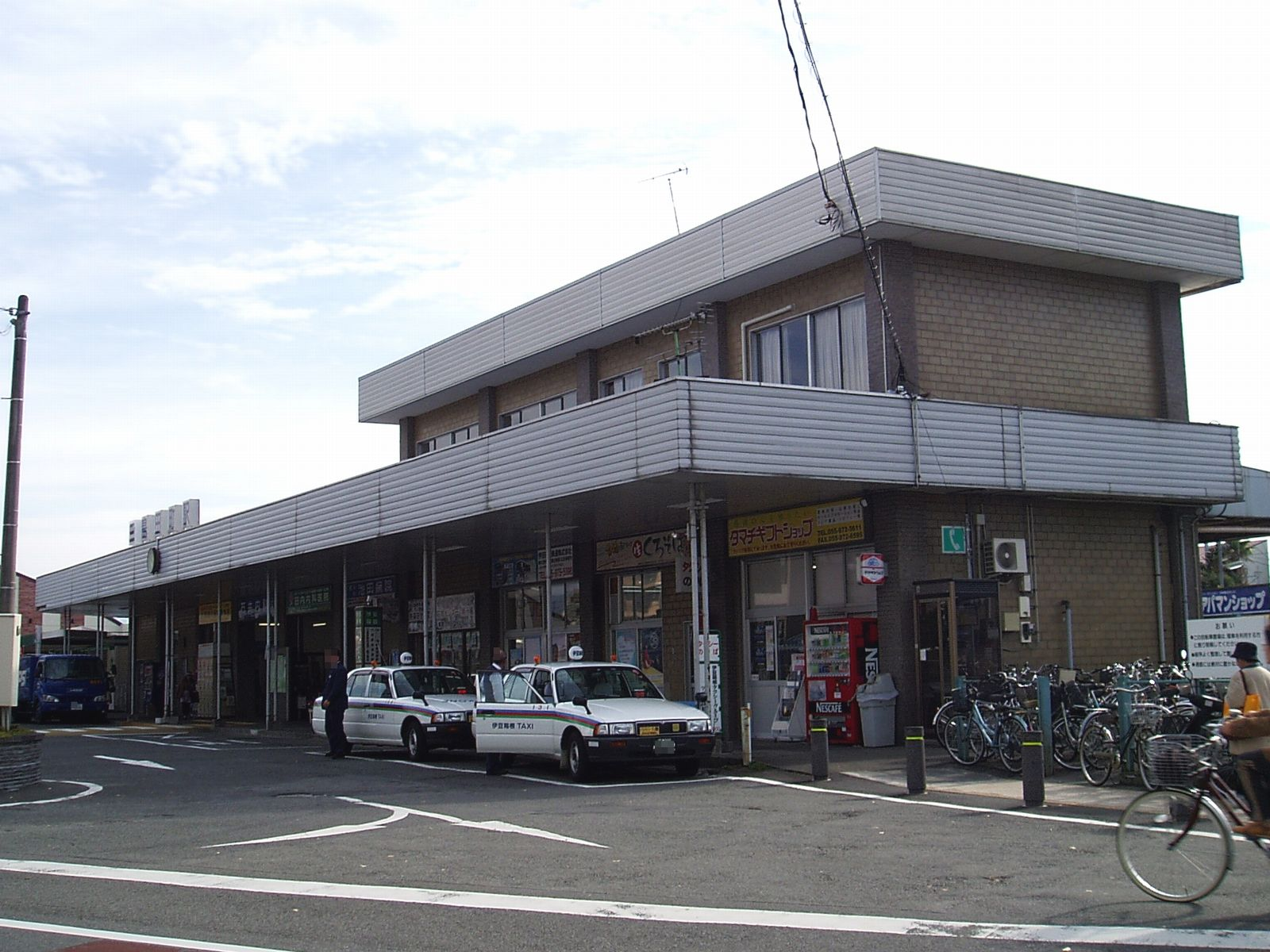
- Exterior of Mishima-Tamachi Station in November 2007

General information
- Location: 3-62 Kitadamachi, Mishima City, Shizuoka Prefecture; Japan
- Coordinates: 35°06′59.55″N 138°55′04.66″E
- Operator: Izuhakone Railway
- Line: Sunzu Line
- Distance: 2.0 km (1.2 mi) from Mishima
- Platforms: 1 side + 1 island platform

Construction
- Structure type: At grade

Other information
- Status: Staffed
- Station code: IS03
- Website: Official website

History
- Opened: 20 May 1898; 128 years ago
- Former names: Mishima-machi (until 1956)

Passengers
- FY2017: 1,368 daily

Services
Preceding station	Izuhakone Railway	Following station
Mishima-Futsukamachi towards Shuzenji	Sunzu Line Local	Mishima-Hirokōji towards Mishima
Daiba towards Shuzenji	Odoriko	Mishima towards Tokyo
Location
- Location within Shizuoka Prefecture Location within Central Japan Location within Japan

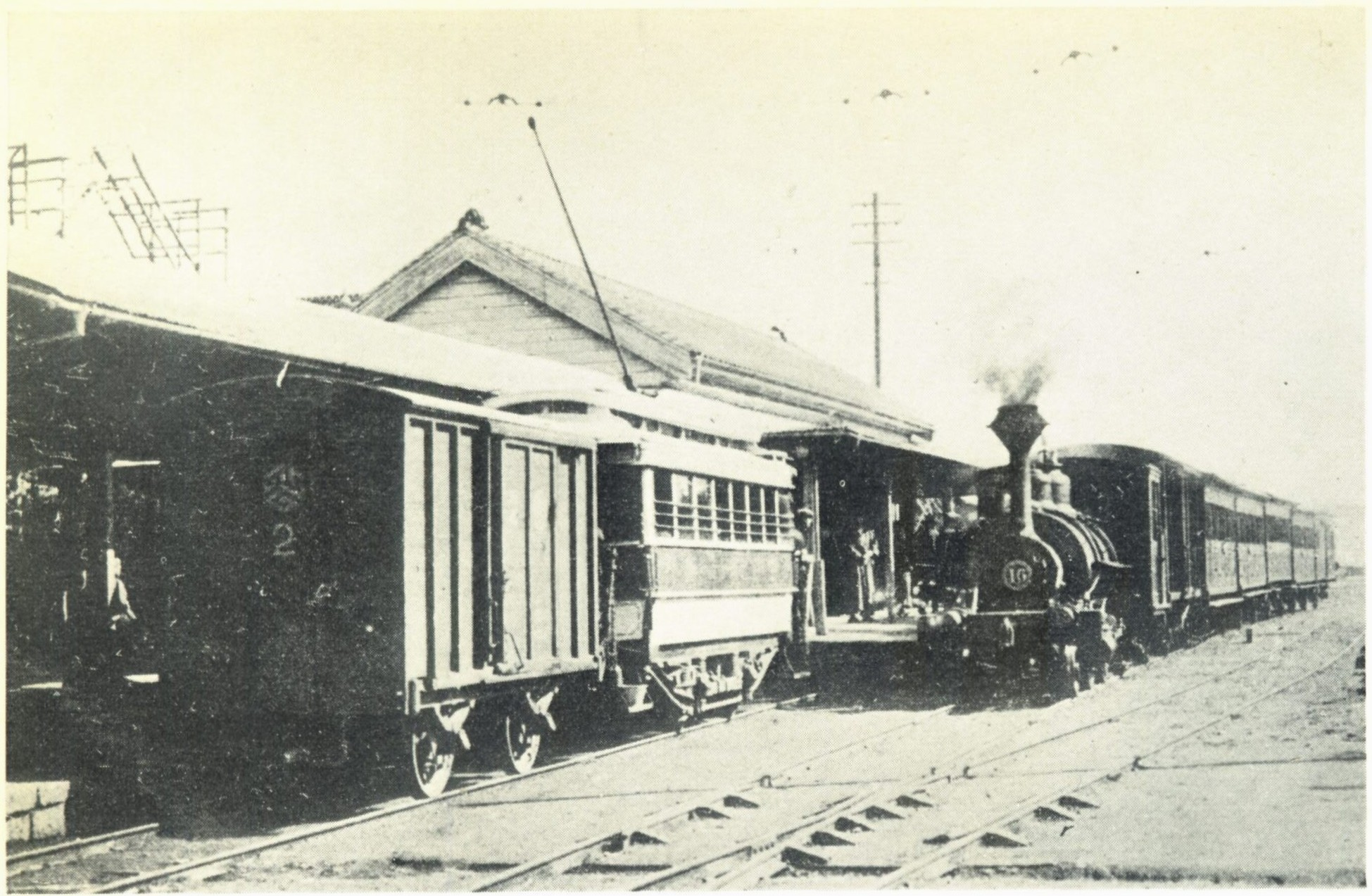
Mishima-tamachi Station before 1919

Mishima-Tamachi Station (三島田町駅, Mishimatamachi-eki) is a railway station located in the city of Mishima, Shizuoka Prefecture, Japan operated by the private railroad company Izuhakone Railway.

== Lines ==
Mishima-Tamachi Station is served by the Sunzu Line, and is located 2.0 kilometers from the starting point of the line at Mishima Station.

== Station layout ==
The station has an island platform and a side platform serving three tracks, connected by a level crossing. The station building is staffed.

=== Platforms ===
1	■ Sunzu Line	For Mishima and Shuzenji
2	■ Sunzu Line	For Mishima, Atami, Yokohama, and Tokyo
3	■ Sunzu Line	For Mishima

== History ==
Mishima-Tamachi Station was opened on May 20, 1898 as Mishima-machi Station (三島町駅, Mishima-machi eki), the terminal station of the initial phase of line construction extending from Nanjō Station (present-day Izu-Nagaoka Station). The line was connected to the former Mishima Station (present day Shimo-Togari Station) on June 15 of the same year. On May 25, 1919 the line was electrified. The northern terminus of the line was moved to present-day Mishima Station in 1934. The station was renamed to its present name on February 1, 1956.

== Passenger statistics ==
In fiscal 2017, the station was used by an average of 1368 passengers daily (boarding passengers only).

== Surrounding area ==
- Mishima City Hall
- Mishima Taisha
- Sano Art Museum

== See also ==
- List of railway stations in Japan
