= Dale Marsh =

Australian painter (born 1940)

- Born: 1940 (age 85–86); Brisbane, Queensland
- Known for: Oil paintings
- Movement: Postwar art

Dale Marsh (born 1940) is an Australian painter. He predominately paints in oils.

== Early life and education ==
Marsh was born in Brisbane in 1940. At nine years old, he entered the Queensland Art Gallery on a scholarship. There he was taught by prominent Queensland artist Vida Lahey.

He studied drawing and painting at the Brisbane Technical College, later studying and art at the Royal Melbourne Institute of Technology.

== Career ==
Marsh's work has been described as postwar art. He is influenced by artists Walter Withers and Ian Fairweather. His paintings, often landscapes, portray the character and natural environment of Australia.

His work is held within several public collections in Australia and overseas, including the Queensland Art Gallery, Queen Elizabeth II's collection, Princess Alexandra's collection, Japan's Sano Collection, Latrobe Valley Art Gallery, and the Australian War Memorial. His work is also held by private collectors throughout Australia, New Zealand, the United States, Malaysia, Hong Kong, Japan and the United Kingdom.

Over his career, over 50 one-man exhibitions have exhibited Marsh's work, in Australia, Japan and the UK. He has also published two books.The Teddy Sheehan painting . The sinking of. The corvete Armidale was commissioned by the director of the Australian war memorial.and hangs in the V.C section of the memorial.

== Personal life ==
Marsh formerly lived on Bribie Island, to which he retains a strong connection. On 28 January 1989, a mural painted by Marsh was unveiled to commemorate both the Australian Bicentenary in 1988 and the 25th anniversary of the Bribie Island Bridge in 1963. The mural was replaced in 1995.

As of 2017, Marsh lives north of Brisbane.
