= Tomomi Takahashi =

Tomomi Takahashi may refer to:

- Tomomi Takahashi (baseball) (高橋 朋己, born 1988), Japanese baseball player
- Tomomi Takahashi (pole vaulter) (高橋 卓巳, born 1956), Japanese pole vaulter
