= Daiba Station =

Daiba Station is the name of two railway stations in Japan:

- Daiba Station (Shizuoka) (大場駅)
- Daiba Station (Tokyo) (台場駅)
