= Izu Kokubun-ji =

- 伊豆国分寺
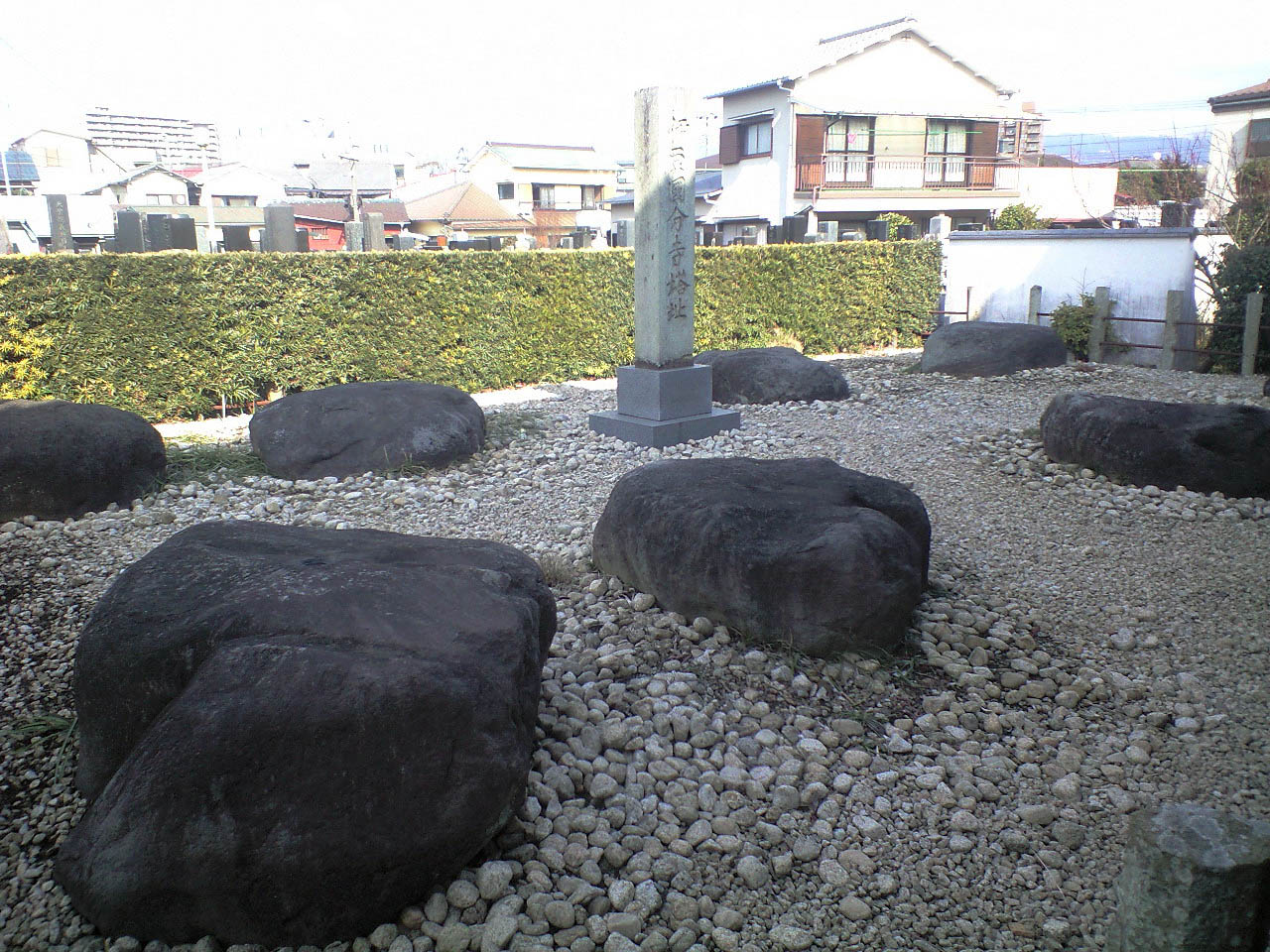
- Foundation Stones from the Nara period pagoda

- Location within Shizuoka Prefecture Location within Japan

Religion
- Affiliation: Buddhist
- Deity: Shaka Nyōrai
- Rite: Nichiren sect
- Status: functional

Location
- Location: Izumi-chō 12-31, Mishima-shi, Shizuoka 411-0037
- Country: Japan
- Interactive map of Izu Kokubun-ji
- Coordinates: 35°7′12.28″N 138°54′35.1″E

Architecture
- Founder: Emperor Shomu
- Completed: 741

Website
- Official website
- National Historic Site of Japan

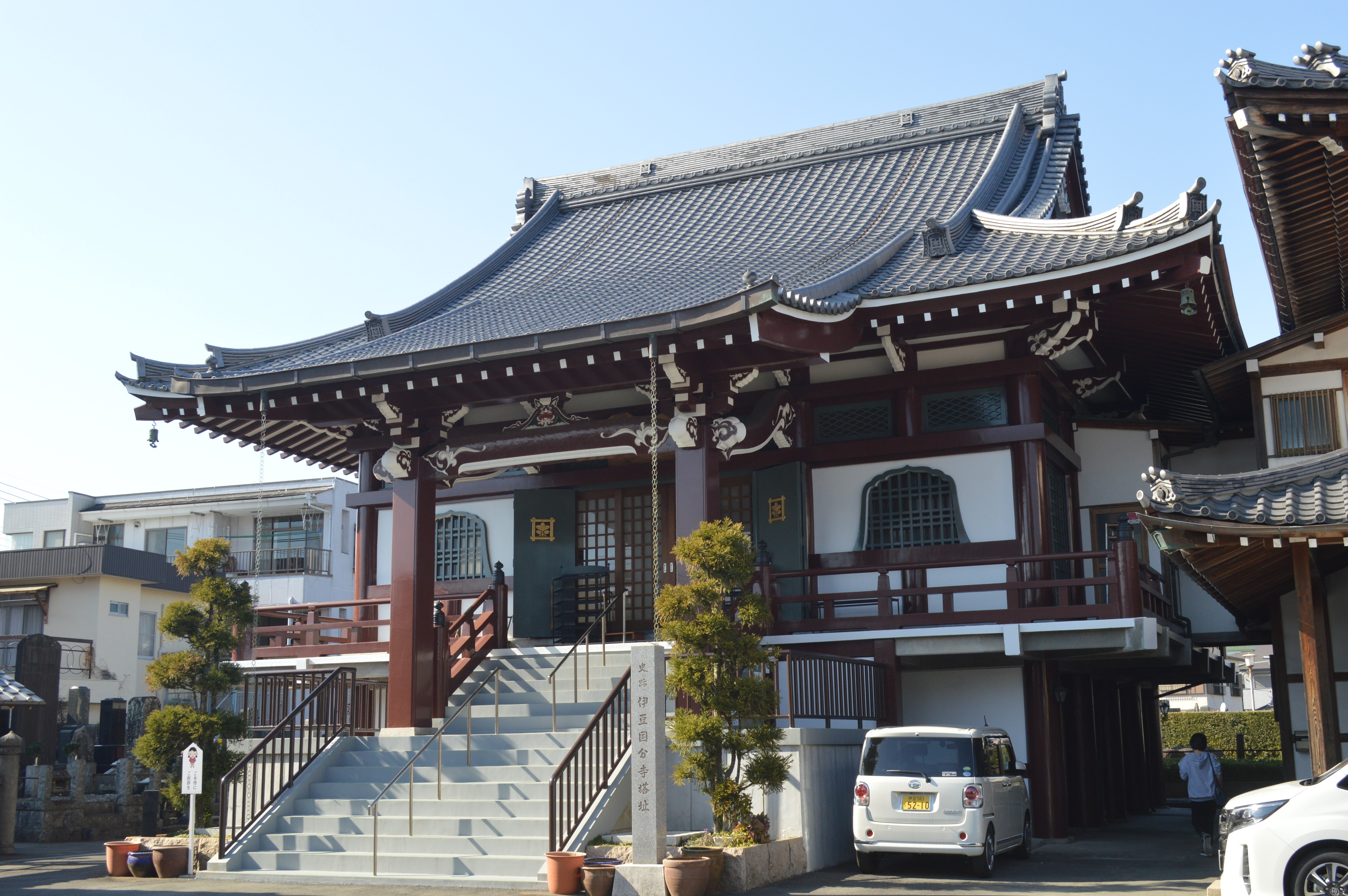
Main Hall of the modern Izu Kokubun-ji

Izu Kokubun-ji (伊豆国分寺) is a Buddhist temple located in what is now the city of Mishima, Shizuoka, Japan. The temple belongs to the Nichiren-shu sect, and its honzon is an image of Shaka Nyōrai. It is the modern successor of one of the provincial temples established by Emperor Shōmu during the Nara period (710 – 794) for the purpose of promoting Buddhism as the national religion of Japan and standardising control of imperial rule over the provinces. The foundation stones for the seven-story pagoda of original temple was designated as a National Historic Site in 1956.

== Izu Kokubun-ji ==
The Shoku Nihongi records that in 741, as the country recovered from a major smallpox epidemic, Emperor Shōmu ordered that a monastery and nunnery be established in every province, the kokubunji (国分寺).

Izu Kokubun-ji was founded in 741 as the provincial temple of Izu Province; however, the precise date of its construction has not been confirmed from archaeological materials or literature. As such a large-scale civil engineering project was unprecedented for relatively poor and remote Izu Province, the financial burden on the local government was also very great, and the temple was not completed until around the Hōki era (770-780). In the section on Izu Province in the Engishiki (dated 927), a temple named Sankō-ji (山興寺) is listed as the "substitute for the kokubunji", so it is possible that the temple had been destroyed by the 10th century. However, the name "Izu Kokubun-ji" continued to appear sporadically in historical documentation afterwards. The temple was converted at some time in the Heian period to the Shingon sect, and was burned down repeatedly in the incessant battles between the forces the Takeda clan and the Odawara Hōjō clan during the Sengoku period. In the early Edo period, it converted to the Nichiren sect and was completely rebuilt; however, these buildings were all destroyed by the 1855 Ansei Edo earthquake and the site was abandoned.

In 1923, the temple was rebuilt again on the same site as Shōren-ji (称蓮寺), and was renamed to Izu Kokubun-ji in 1954. Archaeological excavations were conducted in 1956. The foundations of the South Gate, Central Gate, Kondō and Kōdō (Lecture Hall) were discovered, as wells as the foundations of the surrounding cloister, Sutra Library, Belfry and monks quarters. The layout of the buildings was in accordance with the standardized "Shichidō garan" formation, similar to Tōdai-ji in Nara, the template upon which the kokubunji temples were based and occupied at site approximately 145 meters from east-to-west by 181 meters from north-to-south.

Outside of the main complex, eight original foundation stones of the original Nara-period Izu Kokubun-ji's pagoda were uncovered, immediately behind the present temple's Hondō. The foundation stones were made of basalt, with a height of 1.5 meters. Judging from the size and layout of the foundation, the pagoda was a seven-story structure with a height of 60-meters. The center stone with a circular depression for mounting the central pillar of the pagoda was also found; however, this was removed to the garden of Prince Komatsu Akihito in Tokyo during the Meiji period and its present whereabouts is unknown. Numerous roof tiles have been recovered from the site, with the round eaves tiles having an eight-petal lotus flow motif and the kanji for "flower" and "light" stamped on the reverse. The kanji for "flower" was a symbol for an ancient kiln located in the "Hanasaka" area of Izunokuni city, and the kanji for "light" was a reference to the formal name for the kokubun-ji temples. Some of the excavated roof tiles are on display at the Mishima City Museum.

The temple is located approximately one kilometer south of modern Mishima Station on the JR East Tōkaidō Main Line railway, or 200 meters northwest of Mishima-Hirokōji Station on the Izu Hakone Railway Sunzu Line.

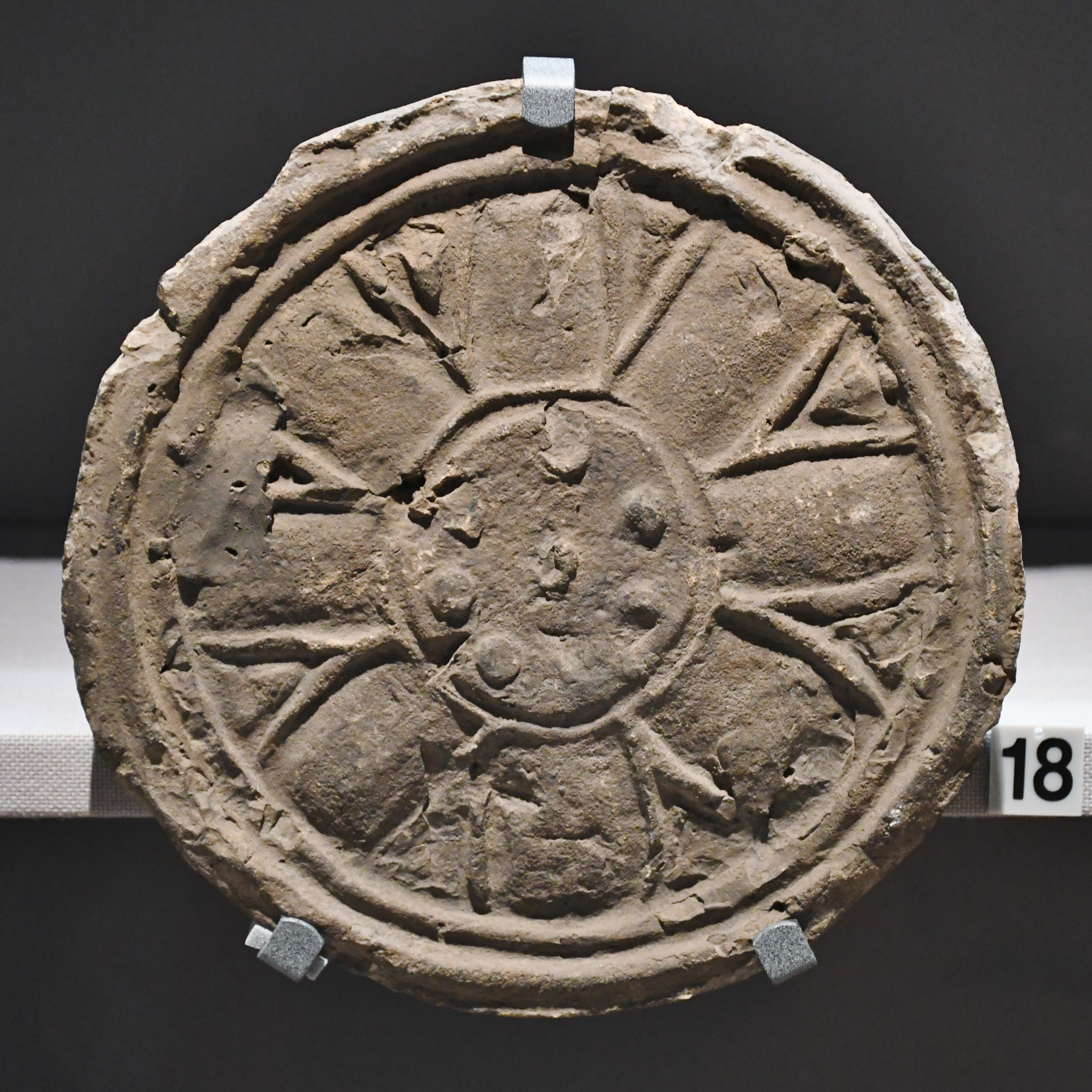
Roof tile from the Izu Kokubun-ji

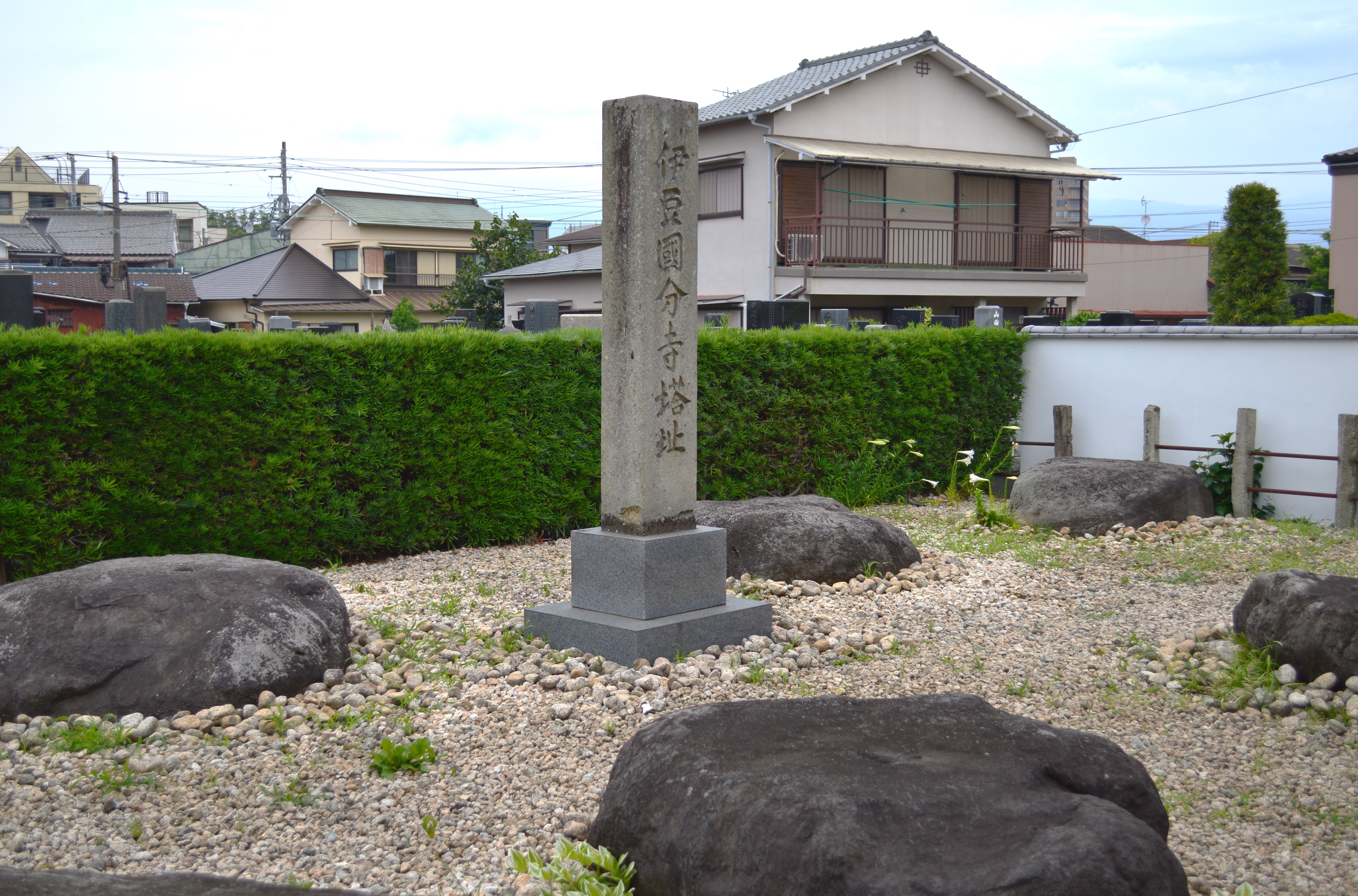
Foundations of the Izu Kokubun-ji Pagoda

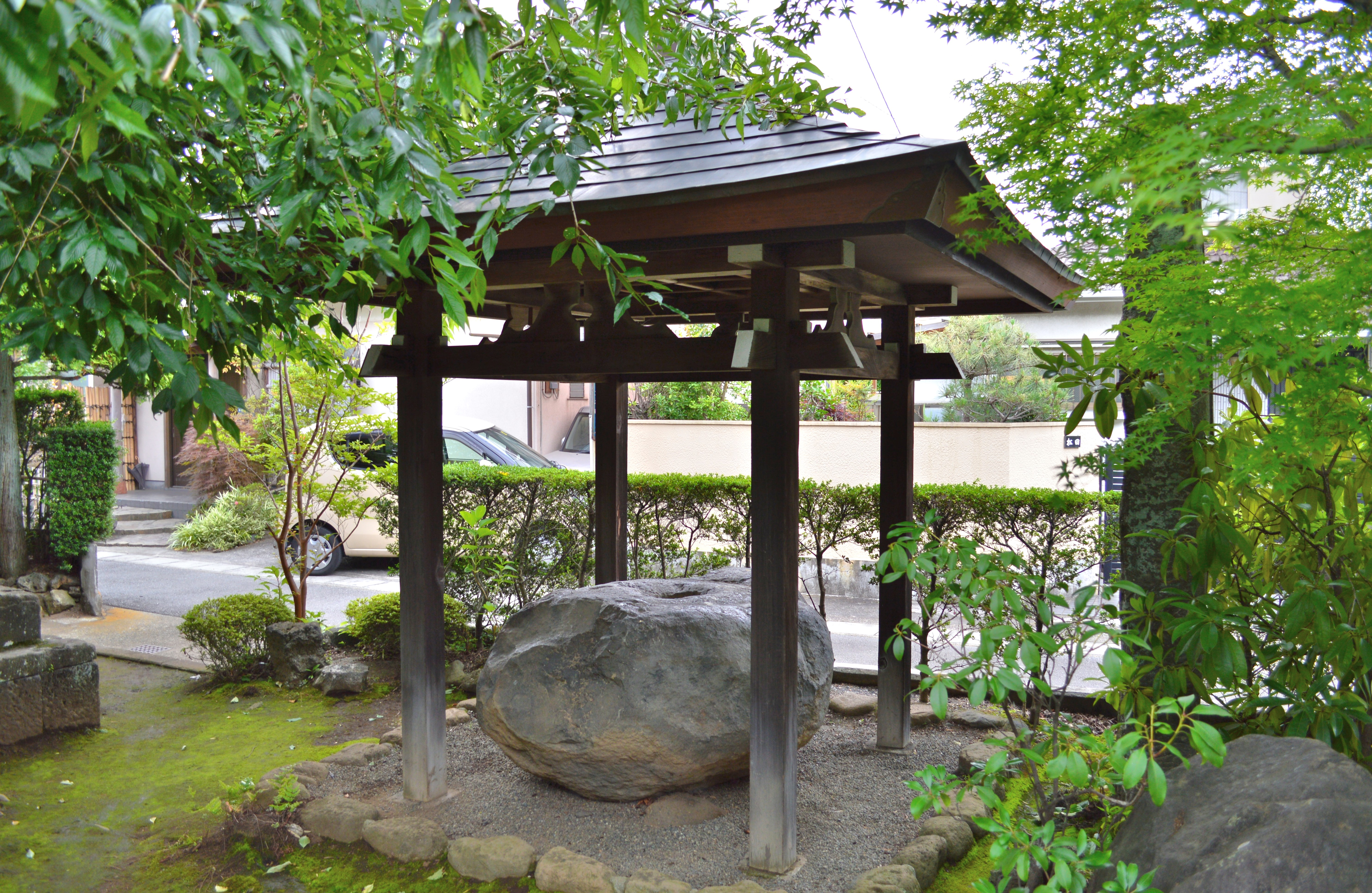
Pagoda foundation stone at Yūsen-ji

== Izu Kokubun-niji ==
The location of the Izu Kokubun-niji provincial nunnery associated with the Izu Kokubun-ji remain uncertain. According to the Nihon Sandai Jitsuroku, the nunnery burned down in 836, and a jōgakuji-class temple (i.e. a private temple with state approval and recognition equivalent to a government temple) was re-assigned the name "Hokke-ji" to take its place. The same entry also says that permission was given to build a new temple in 884. This account is echoed in the Nihon Montoku Tennō Jitsuroku. To the east of the Izu Kokubun-ji is the Ichigahara temple ruins (市ヶ原廃寺, Ichigahara hai-dera ato), which overlap with the modern temple of Yūsen-ji. The foundation stone for a pagoda have been found in the grounds of Yūsen-ji, and is designated as a Tangible Cultural Property by the city of Mishima. It is theorized by Mishima City authorities, and the temple of Yūsen-ji itself, that since there is no precedent for a pagoda at a provincial nunnery site, the Ichigahara site corresponds to the substitute temple mentioned in the Nihon Sandai Jitsuroku, and that the new temple mentioned in the same account is the temple of Hokke-ji, which exists to the south. However, as no comprehensive archaeological investigation has taken place, the extent and complete layout of the Ichigahara site remains uncertain.

== See also ==
- List of Historic Sites of Japan (Shizuoka)
- provincial temple
