= Kyohei Uchida =

Japanese footballer

Kyohei Uchida 内田恭兵
Personal information
- Full name: Kyohei Uchida
- Date of birth: 5 November 1992 (age 34)
- Place of birth: Mishima, Shizuoka, Japan
- Height: 1.71 m (5 ft 7 in)
- Position: Left back

Team information
- Current team: Nagano Parceiro
- Number: 18

Youth career
- –2007: ACN Júbilo Numazu
- 2008–2010: Júbilo Iwata

College career
Years	Team	Apps	(Gls)
2011–2014	Kansai University		

Senior career*
Years	Team	Apps	(Gls)
2015–2017	Kyoto Sanga	50	(1)
2018–	Nagano Parceiro	20	(0)
- * Club domestic league appearances and goals as of 2 June 2018

Kyohei Uchida (内田恭兵, Uchida, Kyohei; born 5 November 1992 in Mishima, Shizuoka) is a Japanese footballer who plays for AC Nagano Parceiro.

== Career statistics ==
Updated to 23 February 2018.

Appearances and goals by club, season and competition
Club	Season	League			Emperor's Cup		Total	
Club	Season	Division	Apps	Goals	Apps	Goals	Apps	Goals
Kyoto Sanga	2015	J2 League	20	0	2	0	22	0
Kyoto Sanga	2016	J2 League	21	1	2	0	23	1
Kyoto Sanga	2017	J2 League	9	0	0	0	9	0
Career total			50	1	4	0	54	1
