= Michi Takahashi =

Japanese teddy bear artist

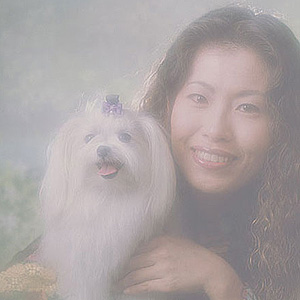
Michi Takahashi

Michi Takahashi (real name: Michiyo Takahashi, Christian name: Saint Mary Chiara, maiden name: Yoshimura, born July 22, 1963) is a teddy bear artist in Japan. She is well known in the teddy bear industry in the world as the pioneer teddy bear artist in Japan, who enhanced the charm of teddy bear as an art, not just a stuffed toy. One of her masterpieces "Look Here Bees! I'm Good Boy Takuya!" was nominated for TOBY awards in 1996¸ and won the highest praise from teddy bear fans in the world. She depicted the art of Takuya Kimura, whom she admires. Michi is also an art producer, an art director, and a soft sculptor. Her husband, Hiro Takahashi (Teddy bear artist), is also a teddy bear artist.

== Brief history ==
- Born July 22, 1963 in Mishima, Shizuoka. Graduated from Nirayama Elementary School, Nirayama Middle School, and Izu Chuo High School in Shizuoka.
- 1985 - Graduated from Showa School of Music Junior College, majoring in Piano. From 1985 participating in regular concert as a pianist.
- 1988 – Married Hiro Takahashi. Discovered teddy bears in Vienna during their honeymoon, and taught herself how to make teddy bears.
- 1993 – Made inroads into the teddy bear market in the US and Europe. Her exquisite workmanship was recognized by teddy bear world overseas.
- 2001 – Private exhibition was held at Yokohama Doll Museum for two and half months. "Michi & Hiro's World", their anthology, was published by Saihodo Gallery.
- 2003 – Opened private museum, "Hakodate Nishihatoba Museum Teddy Bear Art Michi & Hiro's World"

== Art work and activities ==
She made inroads into the US and European market since 1993, and received many awards in Japan, England, and America. She was the first Japanese artist, who was nominated for TOBY awards, called Academy Awards of teddy bear worlds. Four of her creations were nominated for three consecutive years. In 1996, her auction piece, "Over the Rainbow", for the Kobe earthquake charity auction, was appreciated by Princess Nobuko. Her piece was auctioned at 700,000 yen, the highest price among the Japanese artist bears, and she donated whole amount. Because all her work process is done by half-backstitch, she can create only about 35 teddy bears in a year, which makes her creations more valuable as a rarity. Some authoritative museums in Japan ( including Huis Ten Bosch) and England asked her to make special teddy bears for their exhibits. Her teddy bears associated with fantasy, cuteness, and neatness. She tries to establish the art of teddy bears, which people can look, touch, and talk to. She also added the oriental touch to her teddy bears through "Michi Takahashi Kimono Collection". She is recognized as a pioneering cultural ambassador, who advocates Japanese traditional beauty and the connection between East and West. Recently, she started making dogs with mohair as a Maltese dog fancier, and her "Real Dog Mohair " is appreciated by her fans in the world. She is active as a soft sculptor.

== Achievements ==
- 1988
  - October – Established original teddy bear brand of Fairy Chuckle, and started creating
- 1993
  - February – Visited "Winter Bear Fest" by Hugglets (England) as the first Japanese exhibitor, and became a special member of the "Bear Talk Club" in England.
  - May – "Lady Fairy" won the 3rd place at the "Teddy Bear Artist Competition" hosted by Linda Mullins, American Teddy Bear researcher.
  - August – Specially invited to the "Teddy's '93" of Hugglets (the first Japanese), thereafter has exhibited every year.
  - November – Exhibited at the 1st Japan Teddy Bear Convention by Japan Teddy Bear Association, and thereafter exhibited every year.
  - December – Appeared in the Dutch magazine, "Bear Bericht" and Australian magazine, "Bear Facts" (the first Japanese).
- 1994
  - February – Became an honorary member of the "Bear Talk Club" (first Japanese). Donated an ambassador bear, 'Momo", to celebrate the 3rd anniversary, which will be kept permanently in the Golden Cross Museum (England).
  - April – "Madame Fairy" received the grand prize at the 2nd Japan Teddy Bear Convention's Teddy Bear Contest.
  - July – "Fairy Chuckle" was featured in "The Collectors Guide to selecting Restoring and Enjoying New and Old Teddy Bears" by Margaret & Gerry Grey (England).
  - August – Donated "Miss Japan" to Cotswold Teddy Bear Museum (England) for permanent exhibition.
  - October – Exhibited at the Japan Teddy Bear Festival in KOBE by Japan Teddy Bear Fan Club.
  - November – Featured in "Tribute to Teddy Bear Artists Series 1" by Linda Mullin as the pioneer teddy bear artist couple.
  - December – Displayed her work at "World Teddy Bear Collection 1994" at Shinjuku Isetan Museum.
- 1995
  - January – Exhibited at "Linda's Teddy Bear Doll and Antique Toy Show and Sale in San Diego" by Linda Mullins. "Madame Fairy" was specially exhibited.
  - April – "Easter Sunday" was nominated (the first Japanese) for TOBY awards (the best teddy bear awards in America).
  - May – "Fairy Flower Shower" was nominated for TINY TEDS 1995 awards by Teddy Bear and Friends (American teddy bear magazine).
  - October - Featured in "BEARS" by Sue Pearson, teddy bear historian in England, as the representative of Japanese artists.
  - November – Invited to the "WDW TEDDY BEAR and DOLL SHOW 1995", and exhibited.
  - December – Exhibited at the "World Teddy Bear Collection 1995" at the Shinjuku Isetan Museum.
- 1996
  - January – "Over the Rainbow" was auctioned at 700,000 yen at the "Berryman's International Teddy Bear Artists Auction in Japan". Donated whole proceed to Kobe earthquake charity. Her piece was appreciated by Princess Nobuko at the auction.
  - April – "Look Here Bees! I'm Good Boy Takuya!" was nominated for TOBY awards ( two consecutive years). Their mascot, "Fairy Chuckle" figurine was produced by Linda Mullins, and sold by Hobby House Press.
  - March – "Kate and the Favorite Fairies Bedtime Party" was nominated for "British Bear Artists Awards" International category by Teddy Bear Times.
- 1997
  - April – "Oh, What a Fine Night Sky Flowers!" and "Loves me? Loves Me Not? ..." were nominated for TOBY (three consecutive years).
  - May – "Fairy Dream World" was nominated for "TINY TEDS 1997". "The Pole Star Fairy" was featured in the Miniature Bear Fairy World.
  - June – Featured in "100 Japanese Teddy Bear Artists" by Japan Vogue.
  - July – Featured in "Teddy Bear Fun Club International" as the representative of Japanese artists.
  - August – "Baby Theodora" became permanent exhibit at "Park House the TOY and COLLECTERS MUSEUM (England).
  - October – "Chizuru", the symbol of peace, and "Enjoy the Evening Cool" became permanent exhibits at Huis Ten Bosch (Nagasaki, Japan). Special article was published in Mainichi Newspaper.
- 1998
  - January – "Chizuru" was featured the cover page of "Teddy Bear Club International" (first Japanese), and special article was published.
- 1999
  - January – Exhibited at "Linda's TEDDY BEAR, DOLL and ANTIQUE TOY SHOW AND SALE in San Diego". "Moe" received the 3rd place at the Teddy Bear Competition. 'Sakura" was featured in the "Tribute to Teddy Bear Artists Series 3" by Linda Mullins.
  - March – "Moe" was nominated for "British Bear Artist Awards" International category. Special article was published in British "Teddy Bear Scene" (the first Japanese).
  - May – "Chummy Line's Busy" was nominated for "TINY TEDS 1999".
  - August – "Judy and Teddy Edward in Fairyland (Fantasy Fun)" was featured in "MASTERPIECE in MINIATURE Artists Teddy Bear" by Gerry Gray (England).
- 2000
  - January – "Akane", representative of Japan, was exhibited at "Linda's TEDDY BEAR, DOLL and ANTIQIE TOY AND SALE in San Diego".
  - February – "Chizuru" was featured in "Teddy Bears and Friends Identification and Price Guide" by Linda Mullins.
  - April – "Yukata Girl" representing Japan from 8 countries was produced by "Linda Mullins' International Artist Bear Collection" and limited released by Little Gem Teddy Bears, Inc. (USA).
  - May – Created "A Helping Hand" for "Teddy Bear Exhibition for Love" a touring exhibition, to support the removal of landmines activities by NHK Public Welfare Organization. "Akane" and "Moe" were featured in "Teddy Bear Club International".
  - July – "Moe" was featured the cover of "Teddy Bear Scene", and the article of "Michi Takahashi's Kimono Collections" was published.
- 2001
  - January – Special article (the first Japanese) was published in "Teddy Bear and Friends" magazine.
  - March – "A Helping Hand" was featured in "Teddy Bear Scene".
  - May – "The Playmate" was nominated for "TINY TEDS 2001".
  - June – First private exhibition was held at Yokohama Doll Museum (June 30-September 2, 2001), which was the first time they provided the exhibition space for the artist on active list. Special article was published in FOCUS by Shinchosha.
  - July – Works were featured to represent the Japanese artists in "Teddy Bear Centennial Book" by Linda Mullins, "A Century Bears (Teddy Bear Encyclopedia) Book" by Pauline Cockrill, a teddy bear historian, and "Teddy Bears: A Complete Collector's Guide" by Sue Pearson. Appeared on NHK, TVK, Tokyu CATV, and FM Yokohama. Special articles were published in Asahi, Yomiuri, and Tokyo newspapers.
  - August – Special article was published in The Japan Times (English paper).
  - November – "Oh, What a Fine Night Sky Flowers!" was featured in "Teddy Bear Scene".
- 2002
  - January – Michi and Hiro's "Magical Fairy Chuckle" was featured in "Teddy Bear Scene".
  - March – "Christine Chitose" and "A Lovely Day!" were featured in "The Teddy Bear Scene". Special article was published in International Herald Tribune Asahi (English paper).
  - May – "The day I've been waiting for... My sister was finally bone!" was featured in "Teddy Bear Scene".
  - August – Michi and Hiro's "Special Fairy Chuckle" became permanent exhibit at "Teddy Bear Kingdom" in Hong Kong.
  - October – Michi and Hiro's work was used in the "World Artists Stamps" by Saint Vincent and the Grenadines.
  - December – Her work was exhibited at the 100th anniversary of teddy bear charity auction. Maiko "Mamehana" was featured in "Teddy Bear and Friends".
- 2003
  - April – Opened "Hakodate Nishihatoba Museum Teddy Bear Art Takahashi Michi & Hiro's World". The world first museum of the private teddy bear artist.
  - December – Special story of visiting the "Hakodate Nishihatoba Museum Teddy Bear Art Takahashi Michi & Hiro's World" was featured in "Oshare Jikan" by Shufu to Seikatsusha magazine.
- 2005
  - August – A charity auction was held to support the victims of Sumatra earthquake in Washington DC on August 19. Her work was auctioned at $3,000.00, and all proceed was donated.
  - September – Established the internet shop, Malteesedog Exclusive & Comrade, specialize in the high quality stuffed dogs featuring the Mohair Real Dog, which modeling after their talent pet model "Fairy" and "Dolce".
- 2012
  - July – Exhibited at the 48th Kanagawa Art Exhibition, Craft section.
