= Fujimigaoka Women's Junior College =

- 富士見丘女子短期大学
- Type: private
- Active: 1966–2009
- Location: Mishima, Shizuoka, Japan

Fujimigaoka Women's Junior College (富士見丘女子短期大学, Fujimigaoka Joshi Tanki Daigaku) was a private junior college in Mishima, Shizuoka, Japan. It was founded as a junior college in 1965, and was closed in 2009.

== See also ==
- List of junior colleges in Japan
