= Yamanaka Castle =

Castle in Shizuoka Prefecture, Japan

- 山中城
- Mishima, Shizuoka prefecture, Japan
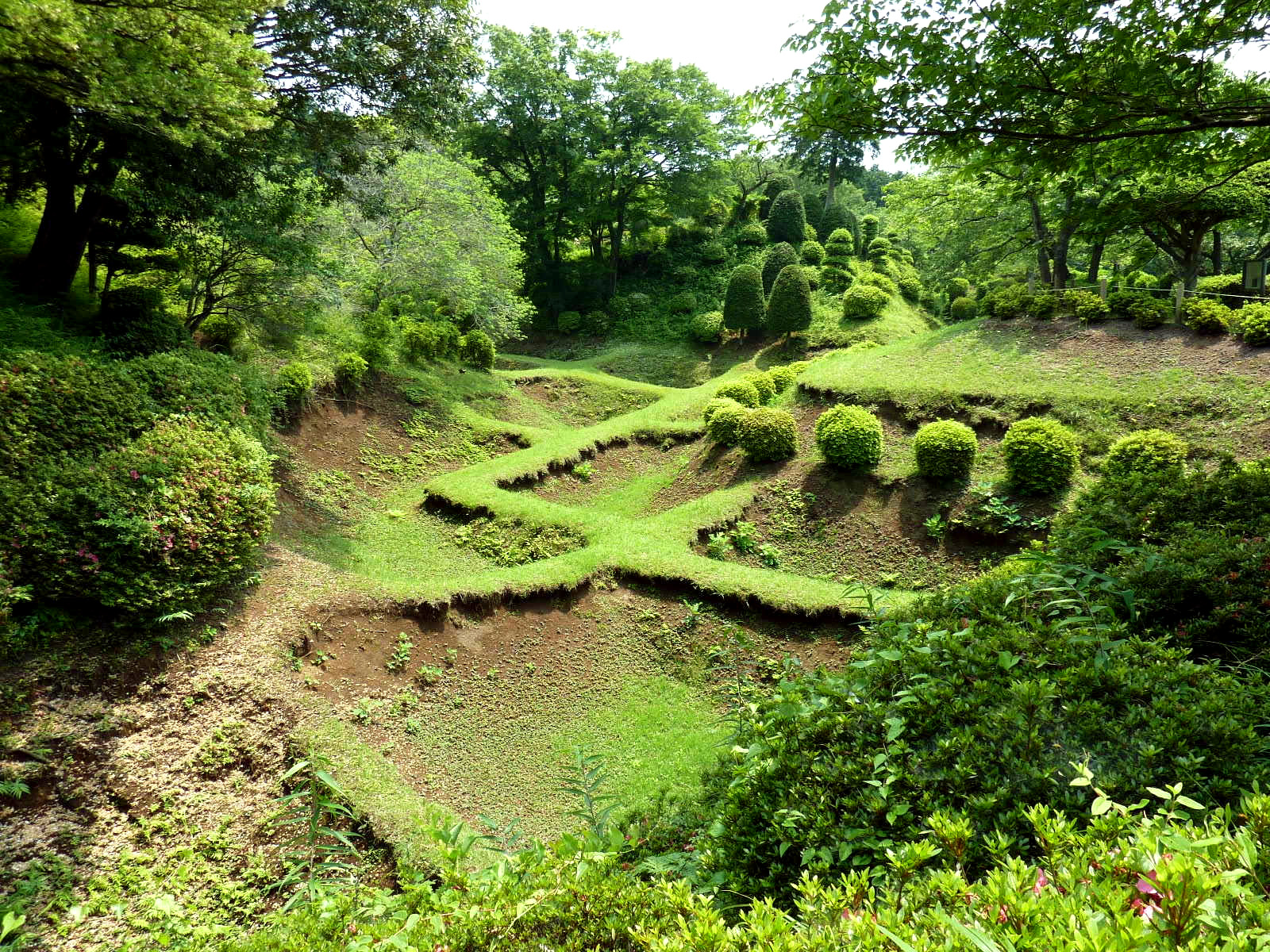
- Unique Checkerboard Moats of Yamanaka Castle

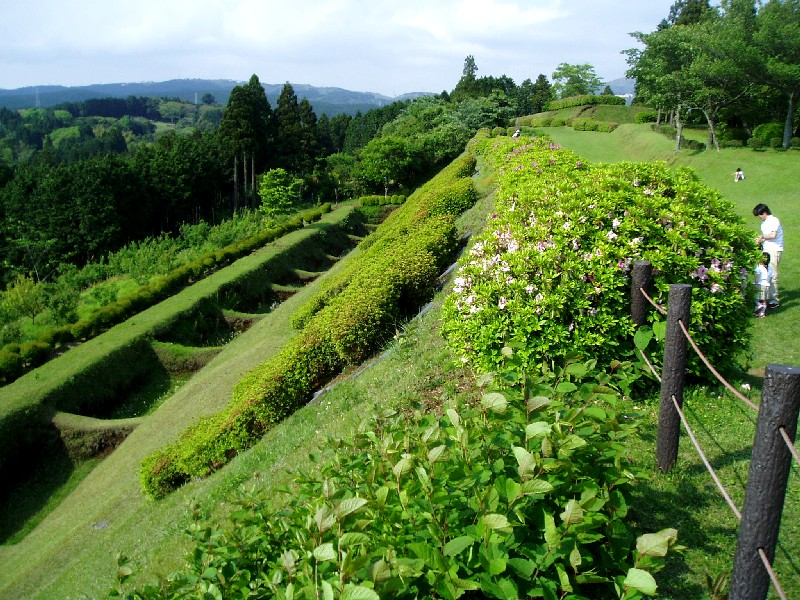
- Earthen works of Yamanaka Castle

Site information
- Type: Yamajiro-style Japanese castle
- Open to the public: yes
- Condition: ruins

Location
- Coordinates: 35°09′23.03″N 138°59′32.71″E

Site history
- Built: 1469-1487,
- Built by: Hōjō Ujiyasu
- In use: Sengoku period
- Demolished: 1590
- Battles/wars: Siege of Odawara (1590)

Yamanaka Castle (山中城, Yamanaka-jō) was a Sengoku period yamajiro-style Japanese castle, built by the Odawara Hōjō clan in Tagata District, Izu Province, in what is now eastern Mishima, Shizuoka Prefecture, Japan. The ruins have been protected by the central government as a National Historic Site since 1988.

== Overview ==
Yamanaka Castle overlooks the strategic Tōkaidō highway halfway of western slope of Hakone Pass. The Tōkaidō highway was the main route between Kyoto and the Kantō region of Japan. The castle has a long and narrow structure, consisting of two lines of connected enclosures extending west and south of the second bailey, which is located just below the inner bailey. These enclosures are protected by deep, wet and dry moats, which were divided into small compartments to further complicate the movement of attackers.

== History ==
The late Hōjō clan was based at Odawara Castle in far western Sagami Province and only a few kilometers from the border with Suruga Province ruled by the Imagawa clan. The Hōjō and Imagawa maintained an alliance; however, after the fall of the Imagawa clan, Suruga was occupied by the Takeda clan of Kai Province and the Hōjō territories were threatened. This threat did not diminish after the Takeda clan was destroyed by an alliance between Oda Nobunaga and Tokugawa Ieyasu, both of whom were at odds against the Hōjō. Yamanaka Castle was built by Hōjō Ujiyasu in the Eiroku era (1558–1577) to guard against this threat.

Despite the growing tension between the Hōjō and Toyotomi Hideyoshi, only a modest attempt was made to strength the defenses of the castle in 1586. When the Toyotomi armies attacked Odawara in 1590, Hideyoshi ordered Toyotomi Hidetsugu and Tokugawa Ieyasu to reduce Yamanaka Castle as quickly as possible, as it lie directly in his line of communications between the front lines and Osaka. In March, the two commanders attacked Yamanaka castle with 50,000 soldiers. In response, Hōjō Ujikatsu resisted with only 4,000 troops. Despite the disparity in numbers, the Toyotomi forces took heavy losses, including one general, Hitotsuyanagi Naosue; however, the castle fell in only a half day of combat and most of its defenders were killed.

Yamanaka Castle was not rebuilt during the Edo period, and the site reverted to forest. All that remains are fragmentary portions of its moats and earthworks.

In 2006, the site of Yamanaka Castle was listed as one of the 100 Fine Castles of Japan by the Japan Castle Foundation, primarily due to its historical significance.

== See also ==
- List of Historic Sites of Japan (Shizuoka)

== Literature ==
- De Lange, William (2021). An Encyclopedia of Japanese Castles. Groningen: Toyo Press. pp. 600 pages. ISBN 978-9492722300.
- Schmorleitz, Morton S. (1974). Castles in Japan. Tokyo: Charles E. Tuttle Co. pp. 144–145. ISBN 0-8048-1102-4.
- Motoo, Hinago (1986). Japanese Castles. Tokyo: Kodansha. p. 200 pages. ISBN 0-87011-766-1.
- Turnbull, Stephen (2003). Japanese Castles 1540-1640. Osprey Publishing. p. 64 pages. ISBN 1-84176-429-9.
