= Mishima, Shizuoka =

Mishima 三島市
- City
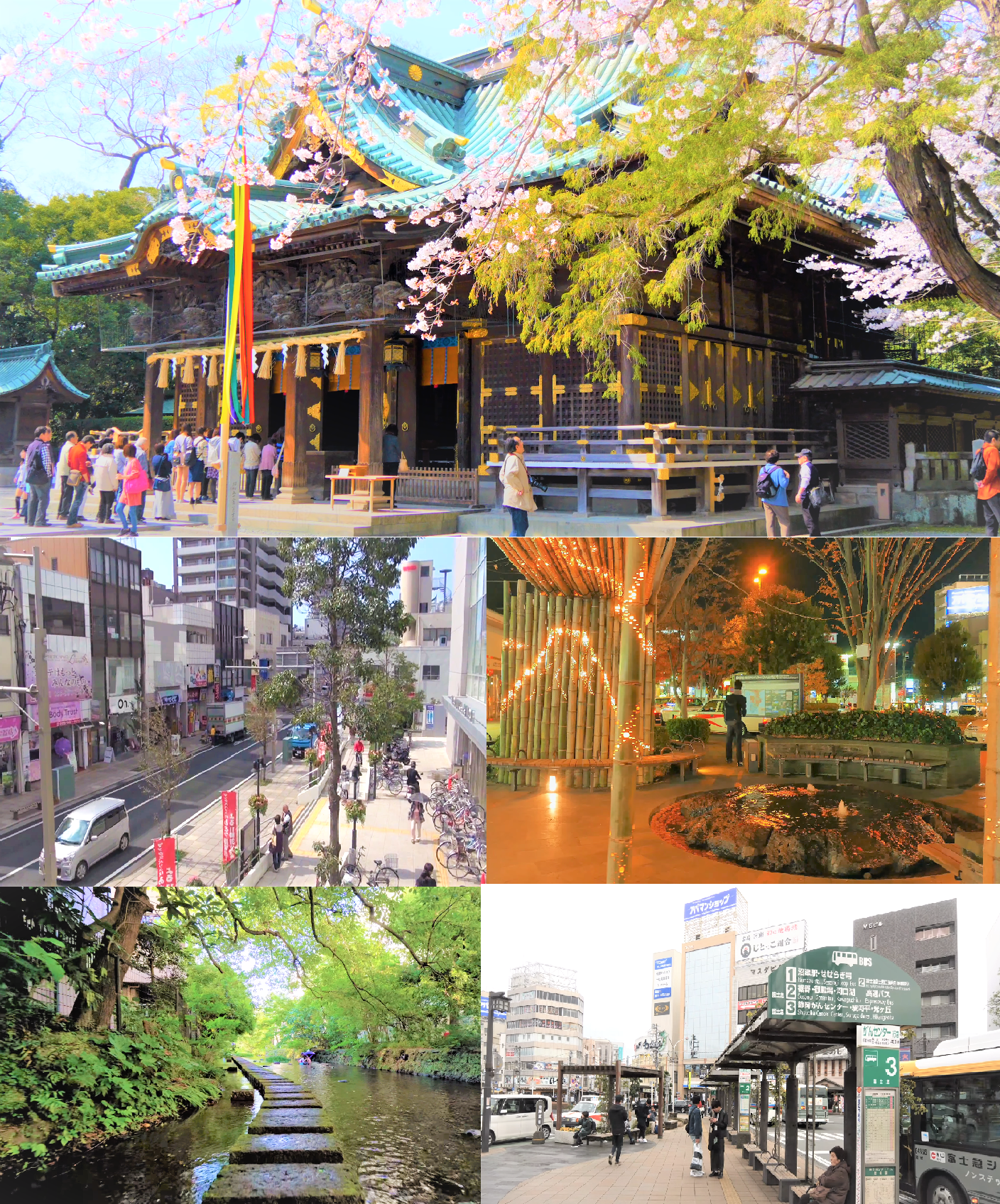
- Mishima Taisha, Mishima Odori Shopping Street, Bamboo light, Genbei River, City center

- Flag Emblem
- Interactive map of Mishima
- Coordinates: 35°07′6.6″N 138°55′6.8″E
- Country: Japan
- Region: Chūbu
- Prefecture: Shizuoka
- First official recorded: 5th century AD
- City Settled: April 29, 1941

Government
  - Mayor: Takeshi Toyooka (since December 2010)

Area
  - Total: 62.02 km^{2} (23.95 sq mi)

Population (October 1, 2020)
  - Total: 107,851
  - Density: 1,739/km^{2} (4,500/sq mi)
- Time zone: UTC+09:00 (JST)
- Postal code: 411-8666
- Phone number: 055-975-3111
- Address: 4–47 Kitatamachi, Mishima-shi, Shizuoka-ken
- Climate: Cfa
- Website: Official website
- Symbols
- Bird: European kingfisher
- Flower: Mishima sakura
- Tree: Ginkgo biloba

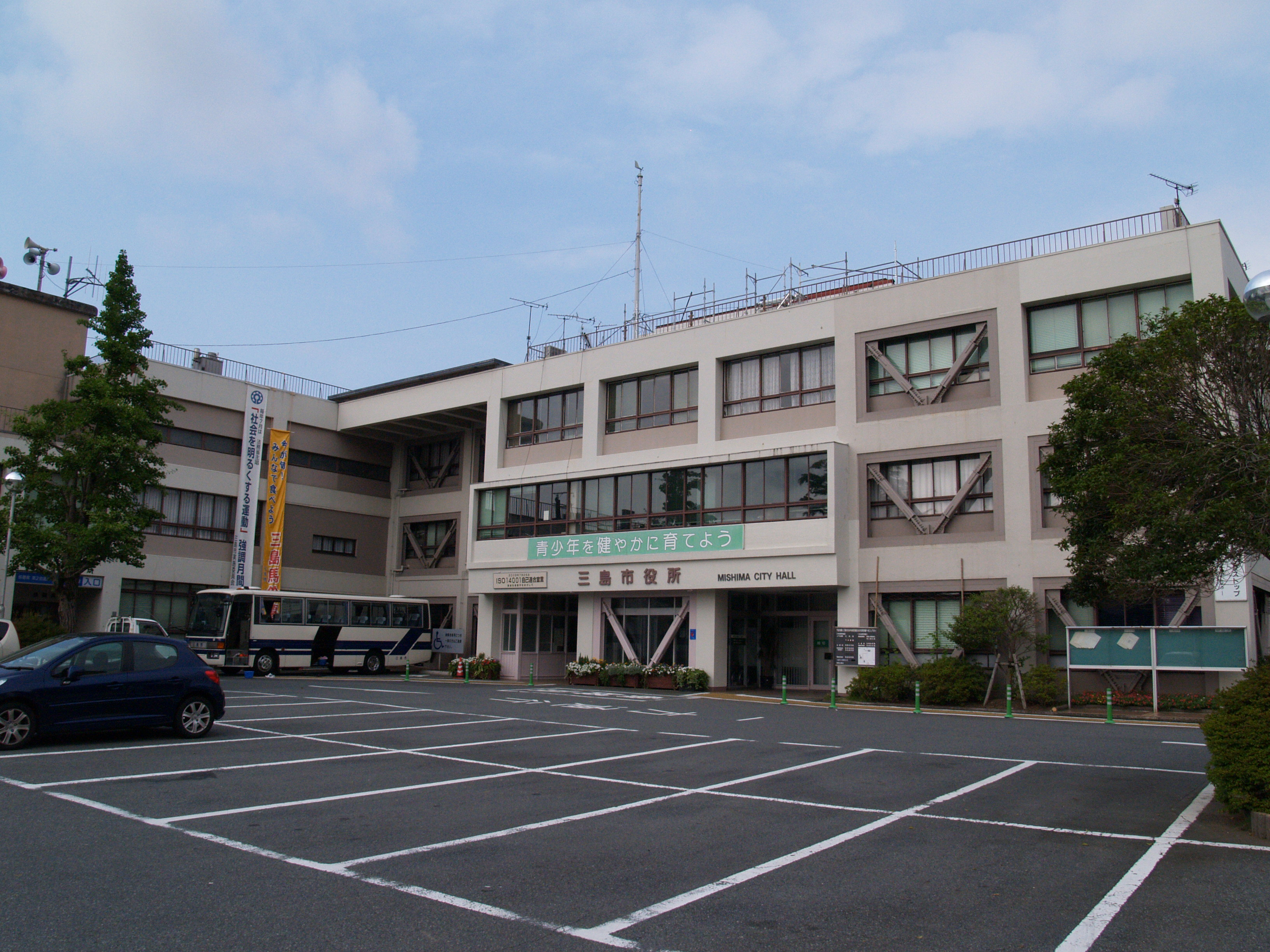
Mishima City Hall

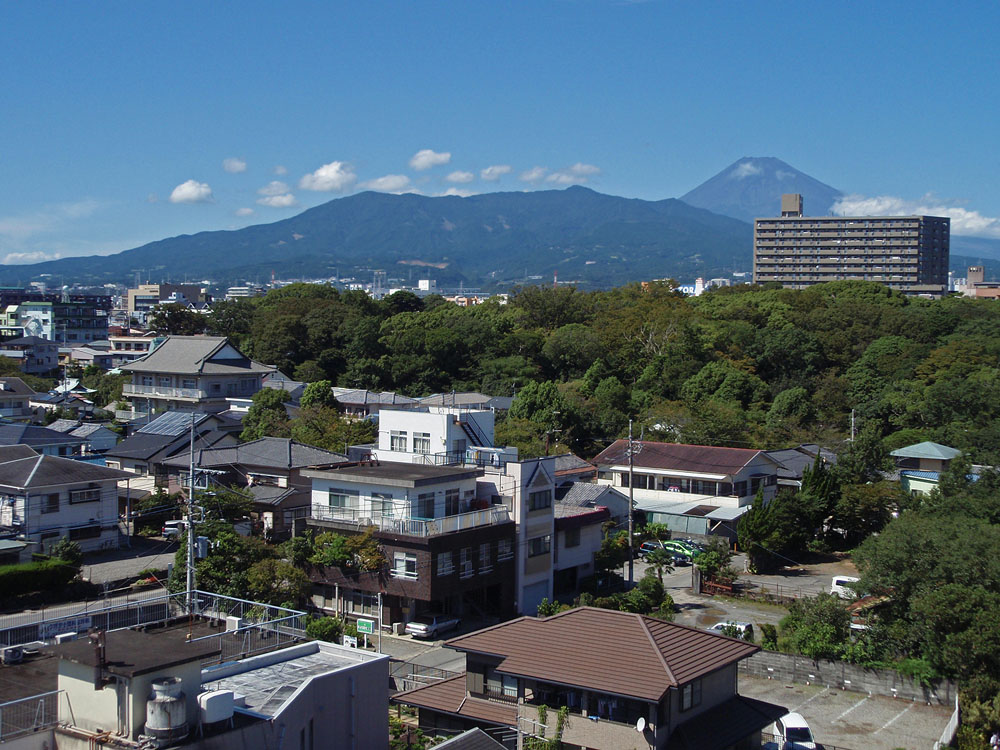
Mount Ashitaka and Mount Fuji seen from downtown of Mishima

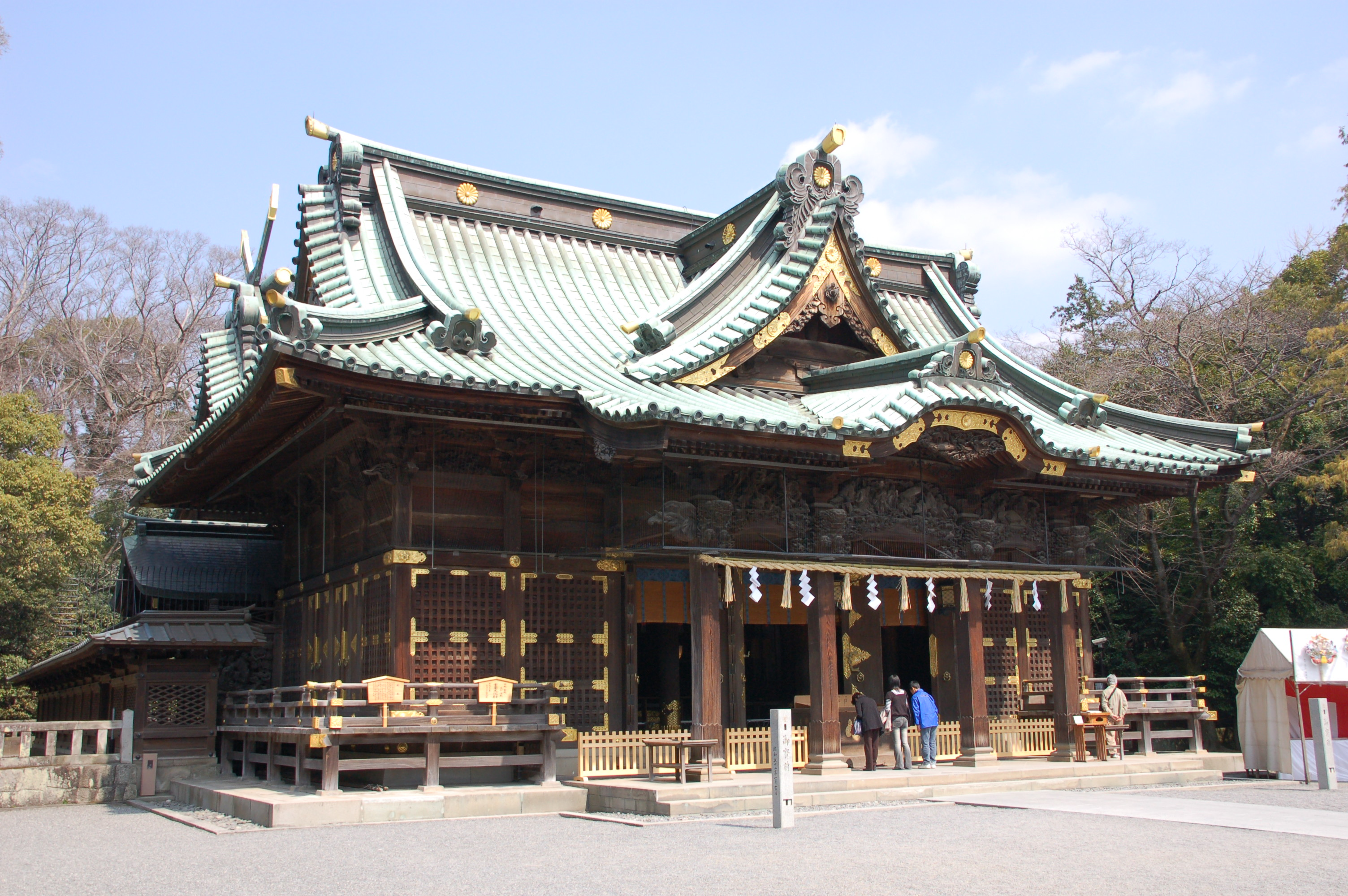
Mishima Taisha Shrine

Mishima (三島市, Mishima-shi) is a city located in eastern Shizuoka Prefecture, Japan. As of 31 July 2019, the city had an estimated population of 109,803 in 49,323 households, and a population density of 1,800 persons per square kilometre (4,700 per square mile). The total area of the city is 62.02 square kilometres (23.95 sq mi).

== Geography ==
Mishima is located in far eastern Shizuoka Prefecture, at the northern end of Izu Peninsula and in the foothills of Mount Fuji.

=== Surrounding municipalities ===
- Kanagawa Prefecture
  - Hakone
- Shizuoka Prefecture
  - Kannami
  - Nagaizumi
  - Numazu
  - Shimizu
  - Susono

=== Demographics ===
Per Japanese census data, the population of Mishima has remained stable over the past 25 years.

Historical population
Year	Pop.	±%
1940	38,827	—
1950	54,516	+40.4%
1960	62,966	+15.5%
1970	78,141	+24.1%
1980	94,612	+21.1%
1990	105,418	+11.4%
2000	110,519	+4.8%
2010	111,823	+1.2%

=== Climate ===
Mishima has a humid subtropical climate (Köppen climate classification Cfa) with hot summers and cool winters. Precipitation is significant throughout the year, but is heaviest from June to September. The average annual temperature in Mishima is 16.3 °C (61.3 °F). The average annual rainfall is 1,868.2 mm (73.55 in) with September as the wettest month. The temperatures are highest on average in August, at around 27.3 °C (81.1 °F), and lowest in January, at around 5.9 °C (42.6 °F).

Climate data for Mishima (1991−2020 normals, extremes 1930−present)
Month	Jan	Feb	Mar	Apr	May	Jun	Jul	Aug	Sep	Oct	Nov	Dec	Year
Record high °C (°F)	24.7 (76.5)	24.8 (76.6)	26.7 (80.1)	28.7 (83.7)	32.4 (90.3)	36.5 (97.7)	37.4 (99.3)	37.7 (99.9)	36.7 (98.1)	32.9 (91.2)	27.8 (82.0)	25.2 (77.4)	37.7 (99.9)
Mean maximum °C (°F)	16.7 (62.1)	19.4 (66.9)	22.1 (71.8)	25.6 (78.1)	28.8 (83.8)	31.7 (89.1)	34.6 (94.3)	35.2 (95.4)	33.3 (91.9)	29.3 (84.7)	23.9 (75.0)	19.9 (67.8)	35.6 (96.1)
Mean daily maximum °C (°F)	11.5 (52.7)	12.4 (54.3)	15.3 (59.5)	19.9 (67.8)	23.9 (75.0)	26.5 (79.7)	30.2 (86.4)	31.8 (89.2)	28.6 (83.5)	23.5 (74.3)	18.6 (65.5)	13.9 (57.0)	21.3 (70.4)
Daily mean °C (°F)	5.9 (42.6)	6.8 (44.2)	10.0 (50.0)	14.6 (58.3)	19.0 (66.2)	22.3 (72.1)	26.0 (78.8)	27.3 (81.1)	24.0 (75.2)	18.5 (65.3)	13.2 (55.8)	8.2 (46.8)	16.3 (61.4)
Mean daily minimum °C (°F)	0.8 (33.4)	1.5 (34.7)	4.8 (40.6)	9.5 (49.1)	14.3 (57.7)	18.7 (65.7)	22.8 (73.0)	23.7 (74.7)	20.1 (68.2)	14.2 (57.6)	8.4 (47.1)	3.1 (37.6)	11.8 (53.3)
Mean minimum °C (°F)	−3.9 (25.0)	−3.8 (25.2)	−1.2 (29.8)	2.6 (36.7)	8.5 (47.3)	13.6 (56.5)	18.8 (65.8)	19.7 (67.5)	14.2 (57.6)	8.1 (46.6)	2.5 (36.5)	−2.6 (27.3)	−4.7 (23.5)
Record low °C (°F)	−9.2 (15.4)	−9.8 (14.4)	−7.8 (18.0)	−2.4 (27.7)	1.1 (34.0)	7.9 (46.2)	11.6 (52.9)	15.4 (59.7)	8.4 (47.1)	0.9 (33.6)	−2.5 (27.5)	−7.8 (18.0)	−9.8 (14.4)
Average precipitation mm (inches)	73.2 (2.88)	91.6 (3.61)	154.9 (6.10)	152.8 (6.02)	158.7 (6.25)	212.7 (8.37)	223.4 (8.80)	168.5 (6.63)	241.8 (9.52)	215.7 (8.49)	110.7 (4.36)	65.1 (2.56)	1,868.2 (73.55)
Average snowfall cm (inches)	0 (0)	2 (0.8)	0 (0)	0 (0)	0 (0)	0 (0)	0 (0)	0 (0)	0 (0)	0 (0)	0 (0)	0 (0)	2 (0.8)
Average precipitation days (≥ 1.0 mm)	5.8	6.3	10.4	10.0	9.8	11.7	10.5	8.3	10.8	10.1	7.7	6.1	107.5
Average snowy days (≥ 1 cm)	0	0.5	0	0	0	0	0	0	0	0	0	0	0.5
Average relative humidity (%)	65	63	65	67	70	75	76	74	75	74	73	68	70
Mean monthly sunshine hours	186.3	168.1	172.2	182.2	184.8	128.9	149.7	191.0	151.2	149.4	160.1	179.4	2,003.2
Source: Japan Meteorological Agency

== History ==
Mishima is an ancient town, which developed around the important Shinto shrine of Mishima Shrine (三嶋大社, Mishima Taisha). Under the Ritsuryō administration system established in the Nara period, Mishima was made capital of Izu Province. It was also the location of the Kokubun-ji for Izu Province. In the Edo period, Mishima prospered from its location on the Tōkaidō highway connecting Edo with Kyoto, and Mishima-shuku was one of the 53 post stations on that road. The area was tenryō territory ruled by a daikan appointed directly by the Tokugawa shogunate. After the Meiji Restoration, Mishima became part of the short-lived Nirayama Prefecture in 1868. This merged with the equally short-lived Ashigara Prefecture in 1871, and became part of Shizuoka Prefecture from 18 April 1876. With the establishment of the modern municipalities system of 1889, the area was reorganized as Mishima Town within Kimisawa District. In 1892, Prince Komatsu Akihito established a villa in Mishima. Its gardens, the Rakujūen, are a noted visitor attraction in Mishima to this day. In 1896, Kimisawa District became part of Tagata District, Shizuoka. Mishima received its first train connection in 1898 when the predecessor of the Izuhakone Railway established what is now Shimo-Togari Station. The Sunzu Line began operations from 1906. However, Mishima's fortunes revived strongly only after the Tanna Tunnel was completed in 1934, connecting the town to the Tōkaidō Main Line railway between Tokyo and Shizuoka. Mishima developed rapidly afterwards, merging with neighboring Kitaue Village in 1935 and Nishikida Village in 1941. Mishima Town was elevated in status to a city on 29 April 1941. It became a stop on the Tōkaidō Shinkansen from 1969, leading to an expansion in population, as the line made it possible to commute to Tokyo.

== Government ==
Mishima has a mayor-council form of government with a directly elected mayor and a unicameral city legislature of 22 members. The city contributes two members to the Shizuoka Prefectural Assembly.

== Economy ==
Mishima is a major industrial center within Shizuoka Prefecture. In addition to a railroad repair facility operated by JR Central, the city hosts factories from:

- Toray
- Teijin (Formerly Toho Tenax)
- DMW Corporation
- Toshiba TEC Corporation
- Yokohama Rubber Company
- CFS Corporation (HAC Drugstores)
- Izuhakone Railway Company Ltd

== Education ==
Mishima has 14 public elementary schools, and seven public middle schools operated by the city government and three public high schools operated by the Shizuoka Prefectural Board of Education. There are one private junior high school and two private high schools. In addition, Juntendo University and the Graduate University for Advanced Studies each have a facility at Mishima. The College of International Relations for Nihon University is located in Mishima. A former private junior college, Fujimigaoka Women's Junior College, was operating between 1966 and 2009.

== Sister cities ==
- Pasadena, California, United States, since 24 July 1957
- New Plymouth, New Zealand, since 29 April 1991
- Lishui, Zhejiang, China, since 12 May 1997

== Transport ==
=== Railway ===
- Central Japan Railway Company – Tōkaidō Shinkansen
  - Mishima
- Central Japan Railway Company – Tōkaidō Main Line
  - Mishima Station
- Izuhakone Railway – Sunzu Line
  - Mishima – Mishima-Hirokōji – Mishima-Tamachi – Mishima-Futsukamachi – Daiba

=== Highways ===
- Tōmei Expressway
- Shin-Tōmei Expressway
- Izu-Jūkan Expressway
- National Route 1
- National Route 136

== Government facilities ==
Mishima is home to the National Institute of Genetics.

== Local attractions ==
- Mishima Taisha
- Ryūtaku-ji Rinzai Zen temple
- Izu Kokubun-ji ruins, A National Historic Site
- Yamanaka Castle ruins, A National Historic Site
- Sano Art Museum
- Rakuju-en Gardens
- The Mishima Summer Festival takes place from 15 to 17 August every year

== Notable people from Mishima ==
- Mirai Aoshima, Japanese professional shogi player ranked 6-dan and chess master (FIDE Master)
- EVIL (Real Name: Takaaki Watanabe, Nihongo: 渡辺 高章, Watanabe Takaaki), Japanese professional wrestler
- Sagatsukasa Hiroyuki (Real Name: Hiroyuki Isobe, Nihongo: 磯部 洋之, Isobe Hiroyuki), sumo wrestler
- Motoo Kimura (1924–1994) evolutionary biologist, lived and died in Mishima
- Yoshiaki Koizumi, videogame designer, director and producer for Nintendo
- Tsutomu Kouno, videogame designer
- Shohei Matsunaga, former professional soccer player (attacking midfielder)
- Makoto Ōoka, poet and literary critic
- Yukiko Sakamoto, Japanese politician
- Nobuyoshi Sano, composer and musician
- Kazuma Suzuki, Japanese stage, film, television actor, film director, fashion designer, and former model
- Hikari Takagi, professional soccer player (Nojima Stella Kanagawa Sagamihara, Nadeshiko League and the Japan national football team)
- Naohiro Takahara, professional soccer player (Okinawa SV, Kyushu Soccer League)
- Michi Takahashi, teddy bear artist
- Tomomi Takahashi, baseball player (Saitama Seibu Lions, Nippon Professional Baseball – Pacific League)
- Hiroshi Takano, Japanese singer, composer, lyricist, music arranger, guitarist and producer
- Kyohei Uchida, professional soccer player (AC Nagano Parceiro, J3 League)
