= Mishima-Futsukamachi Station =

Railway station in Mishima, Shizuoka Prefecture, Japan

Mishima-Futsukamachi Station 三島二日町駅
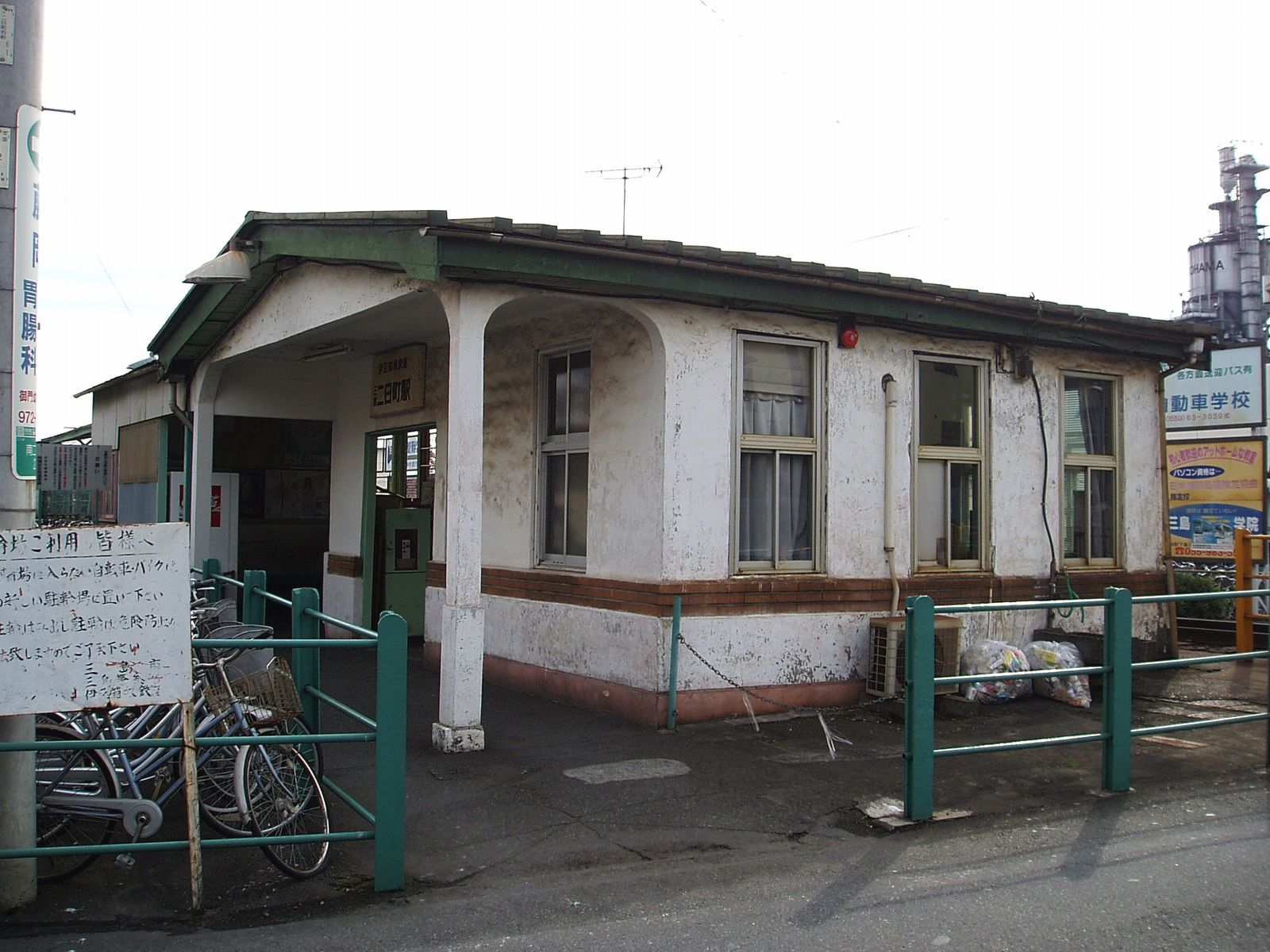
- Exterior of Mishima-Futsukamachi Station in November 2007

General information
- Location: Minami-Futsukamachi, Mishima City, Shizuoka Prefecture; Japan
- Coordinates: 35°06′41.36″N 138°55′31.55″E
- Operator: Izuhakone Railway
- Line: Sunzu Line
- Distance: 2.9 km (1.8 mi) from Mishima
- Platforms: 1 side platform
- Tracks: 1

Construction
- Structure type: At grade

Other information
- Status: Staffed
- Station code: IS04
- Website: Official website

History
- Opened: 15 December 1932; 93 years ago

Passengers
- FY2017: 1,483 daily

Services
Preceding station	Izuhakone Railway	Following station
Daiba towards Shuzenji	Sunzu Line Local	Mishima-Tamachi towards Mishima
Location
- Location within Shizuoka Prefecture Location within Central Japan Location within Japan

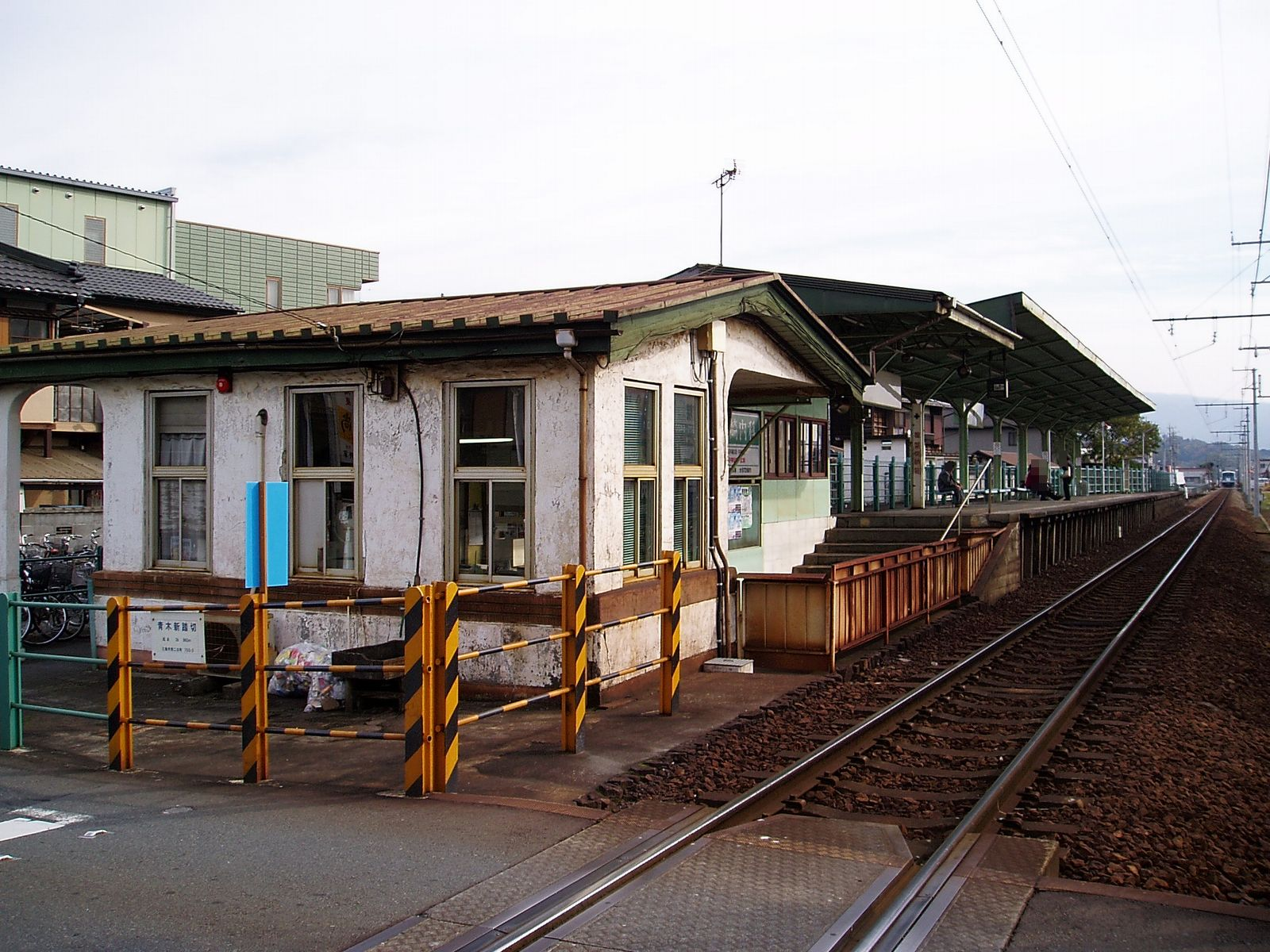
Mishima-Futsukamachi Station

Mishima-Futsukamachi Station (三島二日町駅, Mishimafutsukamachi-eki) is a railway station located in an industrial area of the city of Mishima, Shizuoka Prefecture, Japan operated by the private railroad company Izuhakone Railway.

== Lines ==
Mishima-Futsukamachi Station is served by the Sunzu Line, and is located 2.9 kilometers from the starting point of the line at Mishima Station.

== Station layout ==
The station has one side platform serving a single track. The station building is staffed.

== History ==
Mishima-Futsukamachi Station was opened on December 15, 1932.

== Passenger statistics ==
In fiscal 2017, the station was used by an average of 1483 passengers daily (boarding passengers only).

== Surrounding area ==
- Yokohama Rubber, Mishima plant
- Morinaga, Mishima plant

== See also ==
- List of railway stations in Japan
