= Tomomi Takahashi (baseball) =

Japanese baseball player

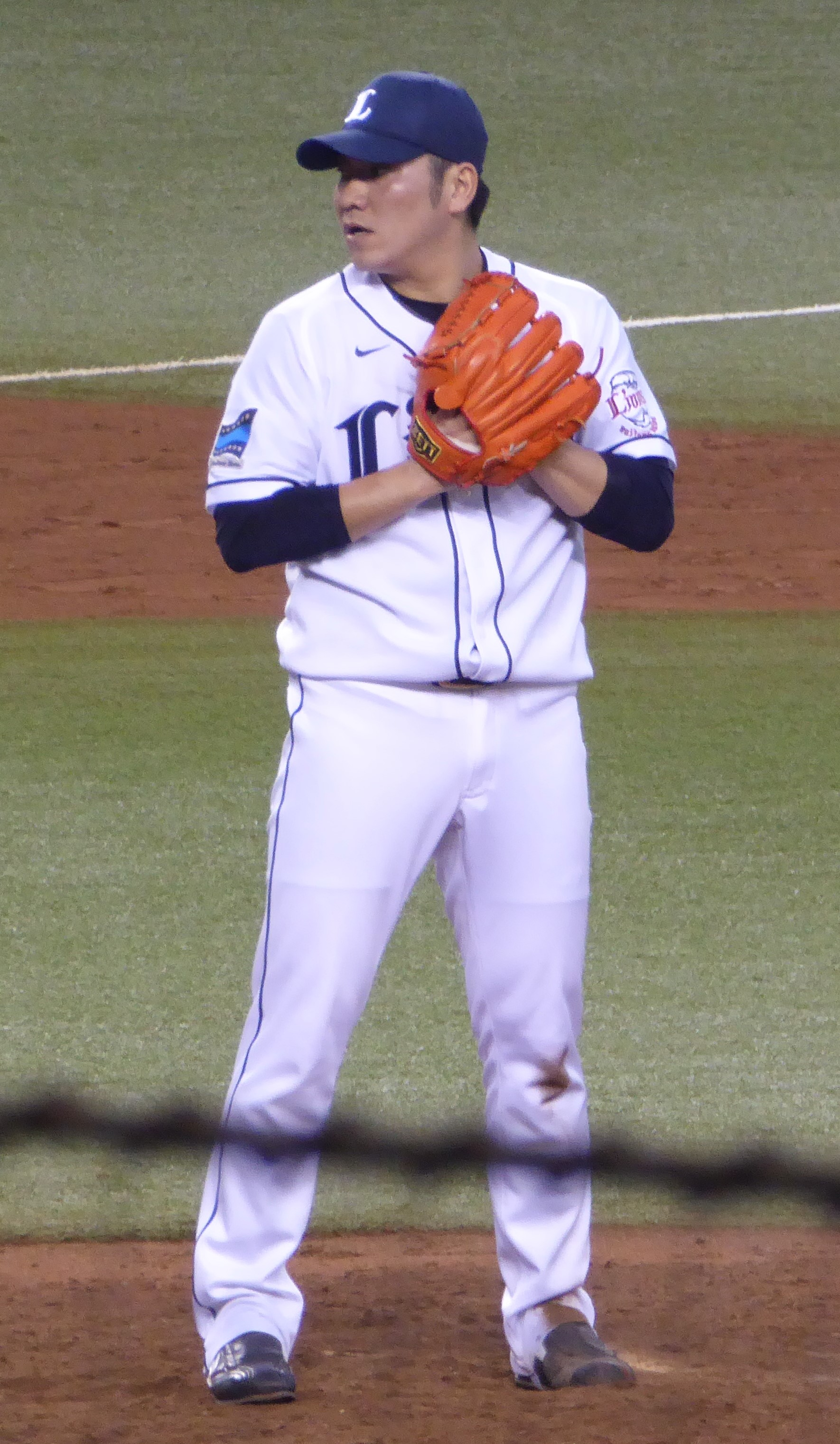
- Pitcher
- Born: November 16, 1988 (age 37); Mishima, Shizuoka, Japan
- Batted: Left Threw: Left

debut
- August 15, 2013, for the Saitama Seibu Lions

Last appearance
- March 31, 2018, for the Saitama Seibu Lions

Career statistics
- Win–loss record: 6-5
- ERA: 2.74
- Strikeouts: 167
- Saves: 52
- Holds: 40
- Stats at Baseball Reference

Teams
- Saitama Seibu Lions (2013–2020)

Tomomi Takahashi (高橋 朋己, Takahashi Tomomi; born November 16, 1988 in Mishima, Shizuoka, Japan) is a professional Japanese baseball player. He plays pitcher for the Saitama Seibu Lions.
