= Mishima Taisha =

Shinto shrine in Mishima, Shizuoka, Japan

Mishima Taisha 三嶋大社
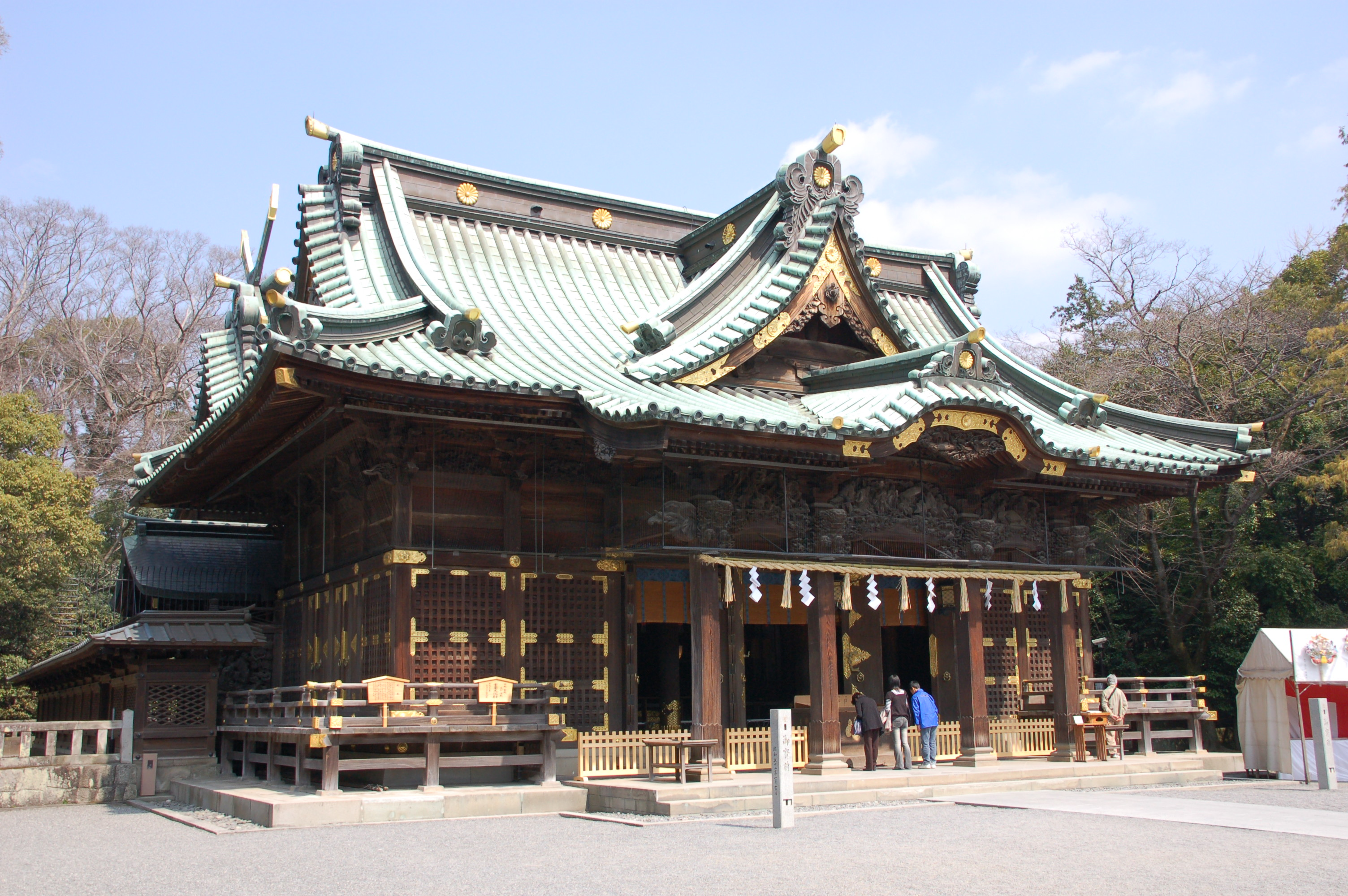
- Honden of Mishima Taisha

- Location within Shizuoka Prefecture Location within Japan

Religion
- Affiliation: Shinto
- Deity: Mishima Daimyōjin
- Festival: August 16

Location
- Location: 1-5 Omiya-chō 2-chōme, Mishima, Shizuoka, 411-0035
- Interactive map of Mishima Taisha 三嶋大社
- Coordinates: 35°07′19″N 138°55′08″E

Architecture
- National Treasure of Japan

Website
- www.mishimataisha.or.jp

The Mishima Taisha (三嶋大社) is a Shinto shrine located in the city of Mishima in Shizuoka Prefecture, Japan. It is the ichinomiya of former Izu Province as well as its Sōja shrine. The main festival of the shrine is held annually on August 16, and features yabusame performances.

== Enshrined kami ==
- Mishima Daimyōjin (三嶋大明神), an amalgamation of Ōyamatsumi-no-mikoto (大山祇命) and Tsumihayae Kotoshironushi-no-kami (積羽八重事代主神)

== History ==
The date of Mishima Taisha's foundation is unknown. Per shrine tradition and Nara period records, the predecessor of the shrine may have originally located on Miyakejima but was transferred later from place to place. It first appeared in national chronicles in the Nihon Kōki in an entry date 832, with the location given as being in Kamo county, which is in the southern part of Izu Peninsula, near modern Shimoda. Subsequent mentions in the Nihon Montoku Tennō Jitsuroku (850, 852, 854), the Nihon Sandai Jitsuroku (859, 864) and the Ruijū Kokushi (868) mention the shrine, but not its location. By the time of the Engishiki in 927 AD, the shrine's location is listed as being in Tagata county, or its present location.

Mishima Taisha was greatly revered by Minamoto no Yoritomo after he was exiled to Izu, and he made prayers at the shrine at the start of his struggle to overthrow the Heike clan in the Genpei War. After the successful establishment of the Kamakura shogunate, he rebuilt the shrine on a large scale, and worship of the Mishima Daimyōjin became popular with the samurai class. The shrine continued to be supported by Yoritomo's successors, especially the fourth Shogun Kujō Yoritsune. During the Sengoku period the kami of Mishima Taisha came to be associated with victory in battle, and the shrine was patronized by the Odawara Hōjō, the Imagawa clan and the Tokugawa clan.

It may have been used as the Izu Province Sōja shrine

During the Edo period, Mishima Taisha and its associated post town of Mishima-shuku prospered as a popular pilgrimage stop on the Tōkaidō highway between Edo and Kyoto. Its torii gate was depicted in an ukiyo-e print by Hiroshige. A calendar issued by the shrine was carried home by pilgrims from all over Japan, and was known as the "Mishima Calendar".

During the Meiji period era of State Shinto, the shrine was designated as an Imperial shrine, 1st rank (官幣大社, Kokuhei Taisha) under the Modern system of ranked Shinto Shrines in 1871, meaning that it stood in the first rank of government supported shrines. However, its name was not changed from "Mishima Jinja" to "Mishima Taisha" until after World War II.

== Cultural properties ==
=== National Treasures ===
- Makiie Box with plum decorations and contents (梅蒔絵手箱 一具, Ume makietebako ichi gu), Heian period. The most important object in the Mishima Shrine collection is a Japanese lacquerware wooden box with maki-e decoration. The box measures 25.8 x 34.5 x 19.7 cm, and contains numerous utensils and articles used for women's cosmetics in the late Heian period. It is the oldest existing hand box that has its original contents. It was donated to the shrine by Hōjō Masako. It is listed as one of the National Treasures of Japan from 1900.

=== Important Cultural Properties ===
- Honden, Edo Period. The Honden a three-bay nagare-zukuri style building, has been reconstructed numerous times over the history of the shrine. The current building dates from 1867, having been rebuilt after the shrine was flattened in the Ansei Tōkai earthquake of 1854.
- Tachi Japanese sword (太刀), Kamakura period; Forged by Munetada of the Ichimonji school in Fukuoka, Bizen Province. Its blade is 81.8 cm long, and retains the style of the late Heian period. It was donated to the shrine by Emperor Meiji.
- Wakizashi short sword (短刀), Nanboku-cho period (1364), with the inscription "Mishima Daimyojin Tanin Fuyo no Yono" (Mishima Daimyojin, not to be shared with anyone) by Fujiwara Tomoyuki
- Heart Sutra (紙本墨書般若心経 源頼家筆), Kamakura period (1203), written by Minamoto no Yoriie
- Yatabe Family Documents (矢田部家文書), a collection of 592 documents of shrine records from the Kamakura through Edo periods.

=== Natural Monuments ===
- Osmanthus fragrans tree, estimated to be 1200-years-old in the shrine precincts is protected by the national government as a Natural Monument.

=== Shizuoka Prefecture Designated Tangible Cultural Properties ===
- Nihon Shoki and Gusho (日本書紀並びに具書), Muromachi period (1438); This copy is called the "Mishima Nihonshoki." The "Nihon Shoki" consists of 30 volumes, of which this copy consists of only volumes 1 through 3 (Kamiyo-jo, Kamiyo-shi, and Jinmu Tenno-ki) and three volumes (Nakatomi Harae-kai, Kamiguchi-ketsu, and Nijuichisha Shugo-ki) are preserved. A portion of the extant copy is held at the Kokugakuin University Library. It was designated a National Important Art Treasure on April 13, 1949, and a Shizuoka Prefecture Tangible Cultural Property on November 28, 1980,

== Gallery ==
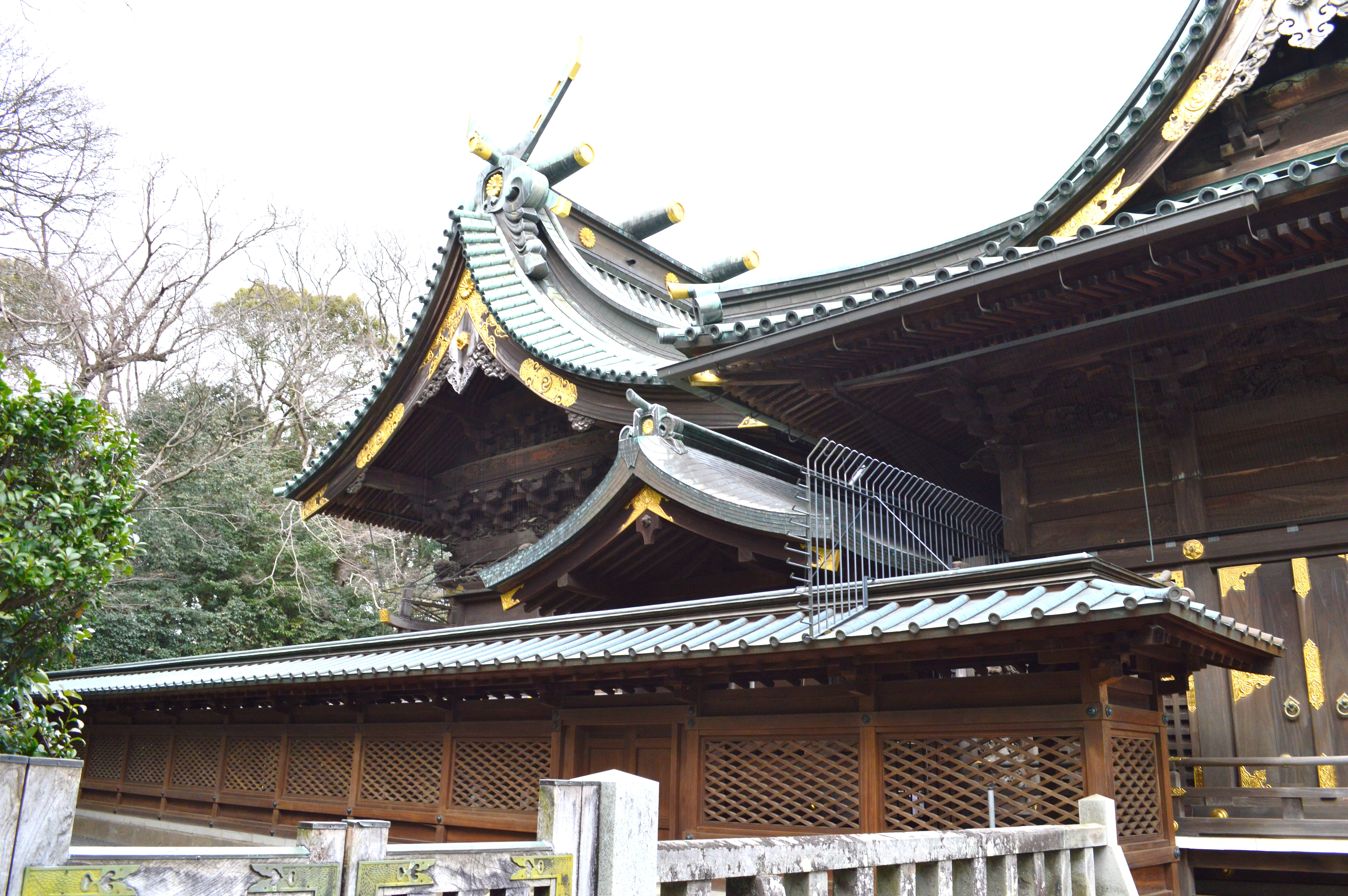
Honden

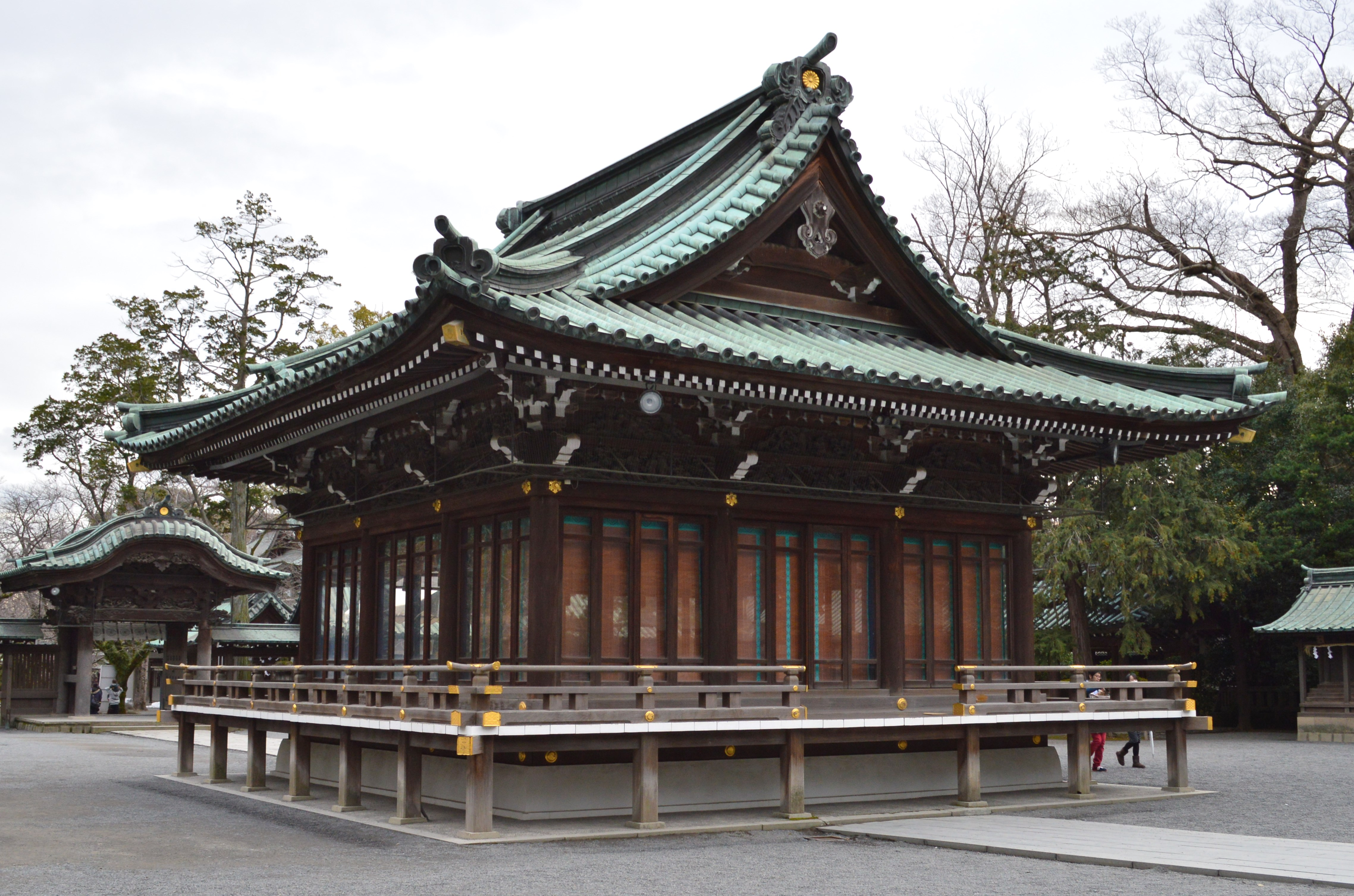
Maidono

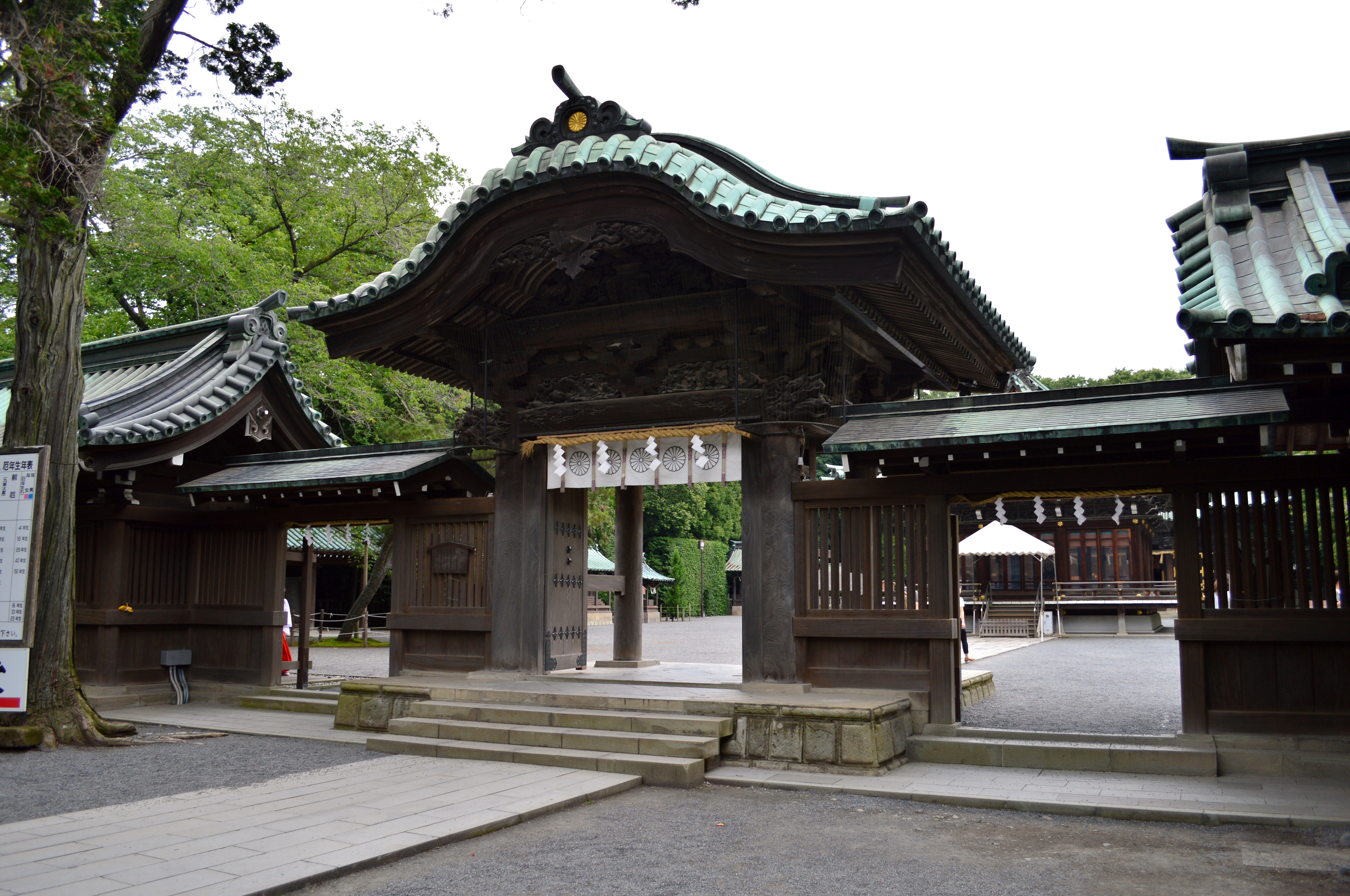
Jinmon

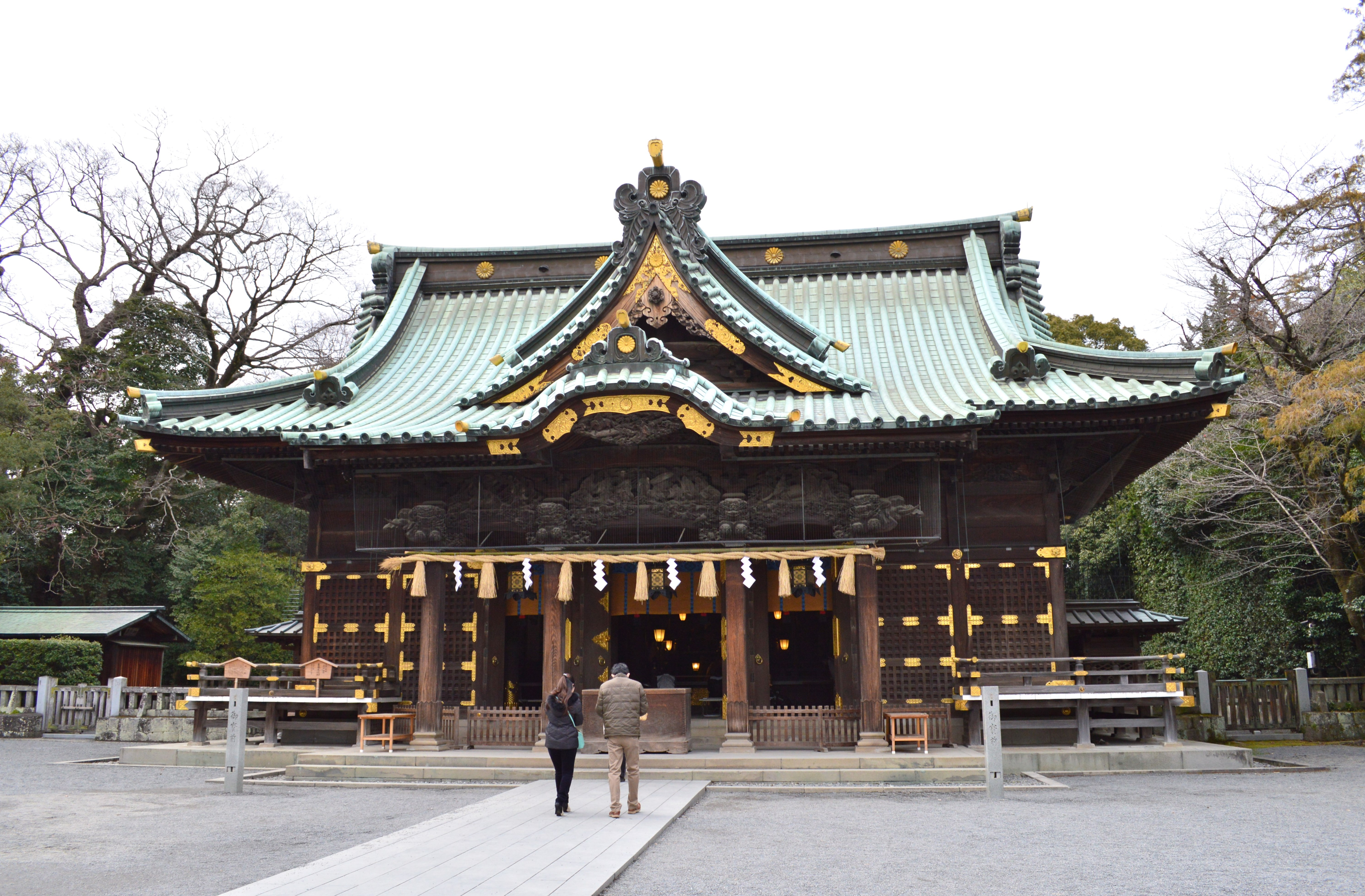
Haiden

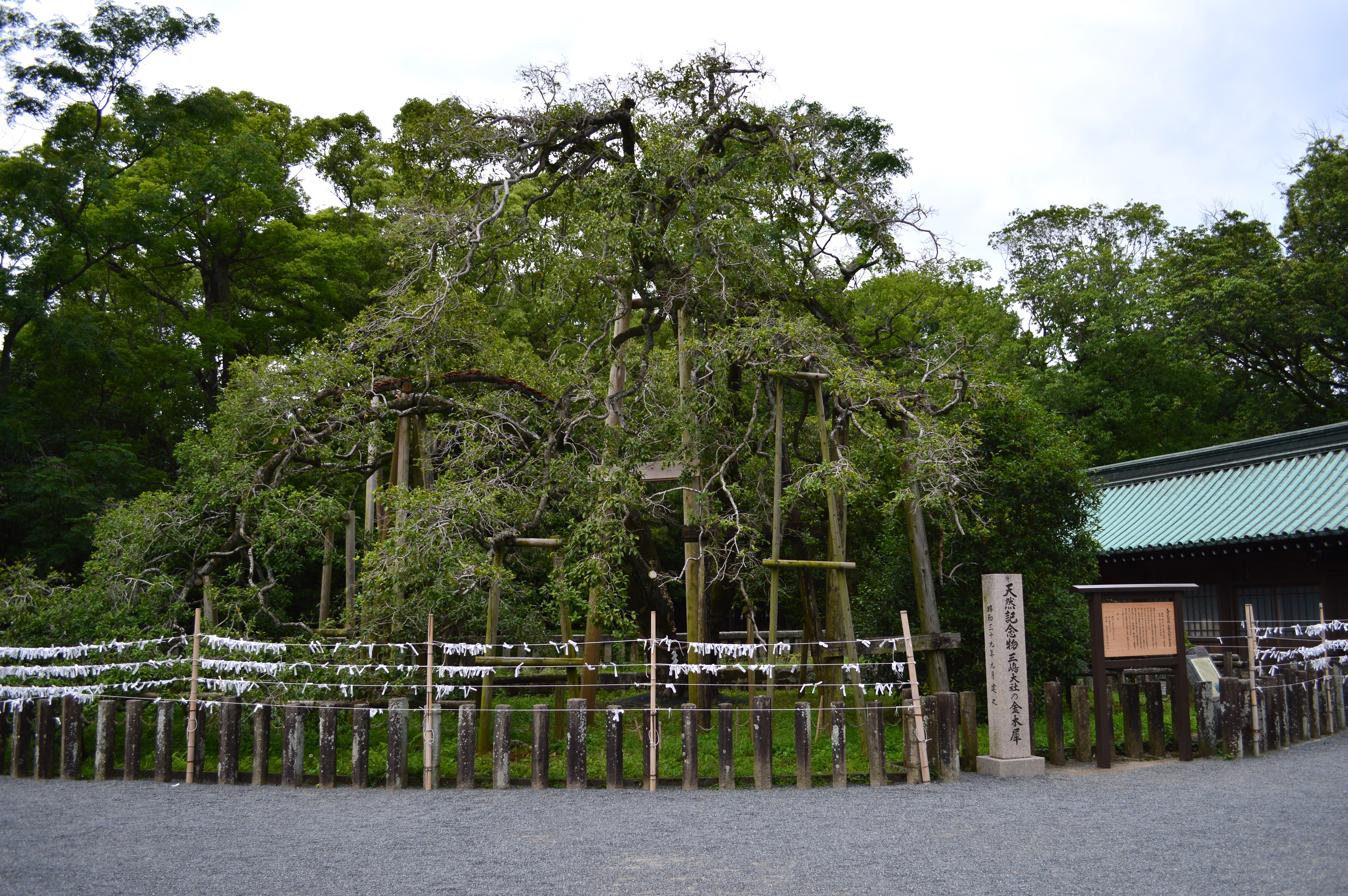
Osmanthus fragrans tree

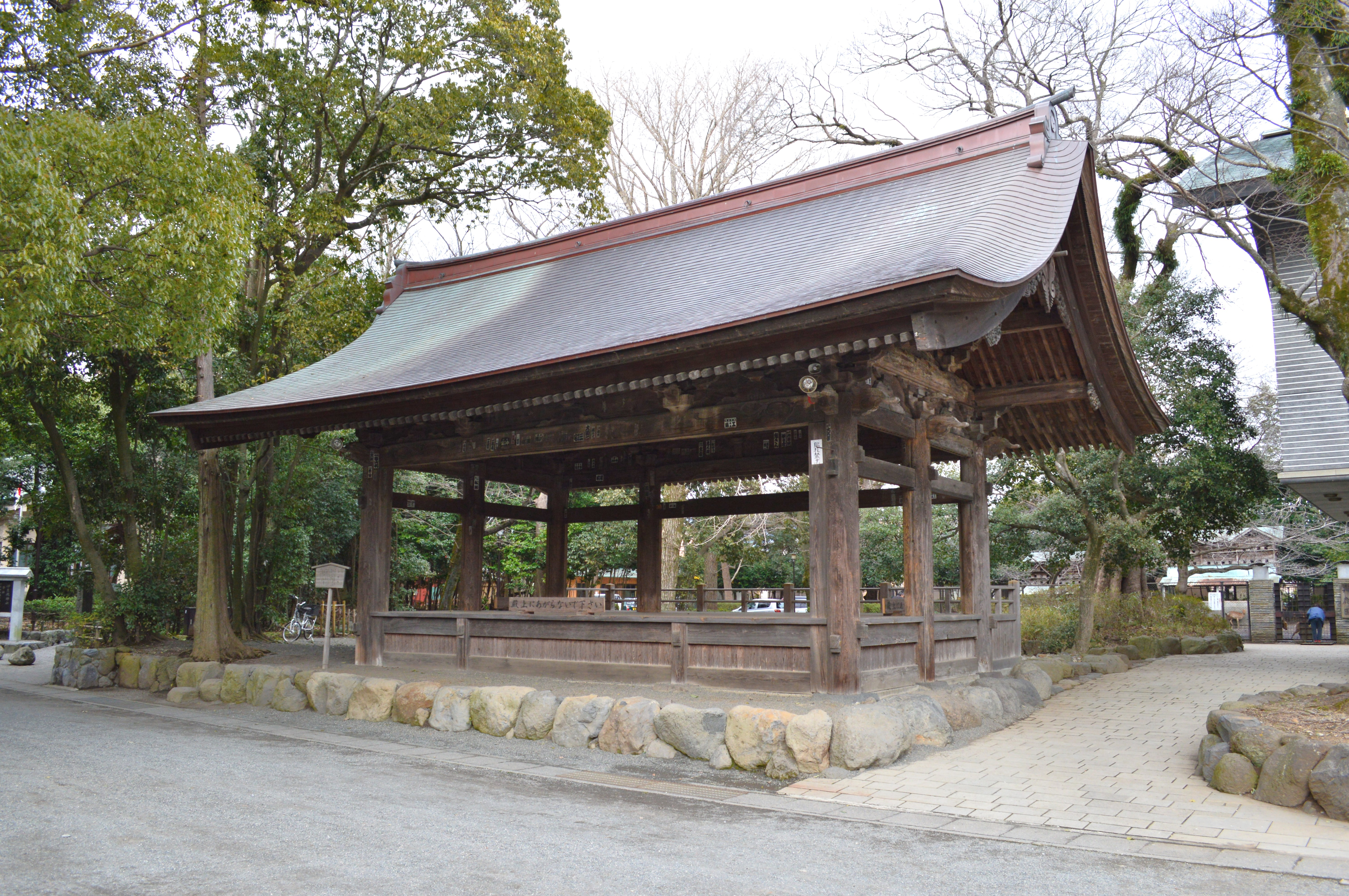
Geinōden

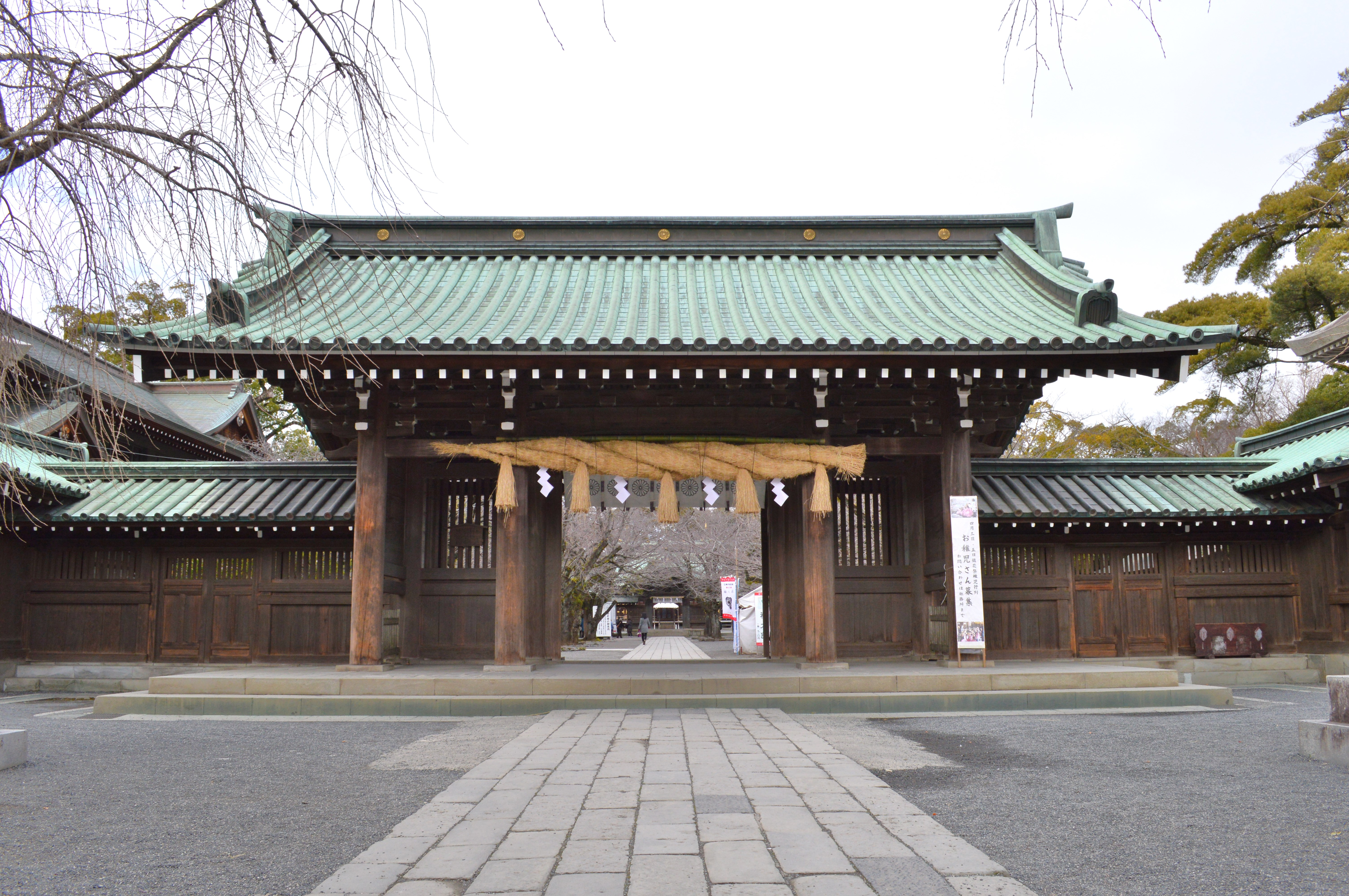
Main Gate

== See also ==
- List of National Treasures of Japan (crafts-others)
- List of Shinto shrines
- Ichinomiya
- Geographic data related to Mishima Taisha at OpenStreetMap
