= Daiba Station (Shizuoka) =

Railway station in Mishima, Shizuoka Prefecture, Japan

Daiba Station 大場駅
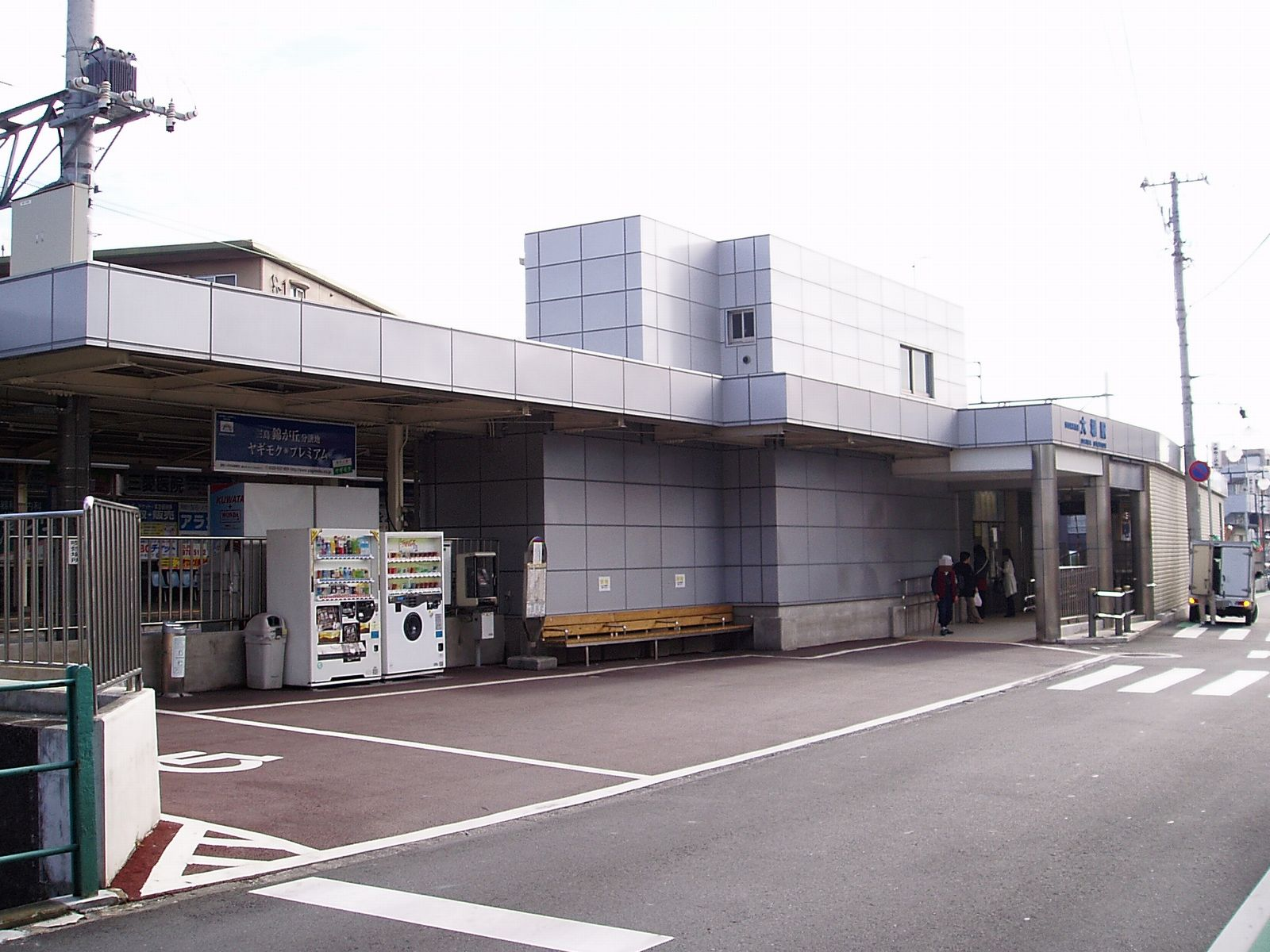
- Exterior of Daiba Station in November 2007

General information
- Location: Daiba 136-2, Mishima-shi, Shizuoka-ken; Japan
- Coordinates: 35°05′31.25″N 138°56′21.64″E
- Operator: Izuhakone Railway
- Line: Sunzu Line
- Distance: 5.5 km (3.4 mi) from Mishima
- Platforms: 1 side + 1 island platform
- Tracks: 3

Construction
- Structure type: At grade

Other information
- Status: Staffed
- Station code: IS05
- Website: Official website

History
- Opened: 20 May 1898; 128 years ago

Passengers
- FY2017: 2488 daily

Services
Preceding station	Izuhakone Railway	Following station
Izu-Nitta towards Shuzenji	Sunzu Line Local	Mishima-Futsukamachi towards Mishima
Izu-Nagaoka towards Shuzenji	Odoriko	Mishima-Tamachi towards Tokyo
Location
- Location within Shizuoka Prefecture Location within Central Japan Location within Japan

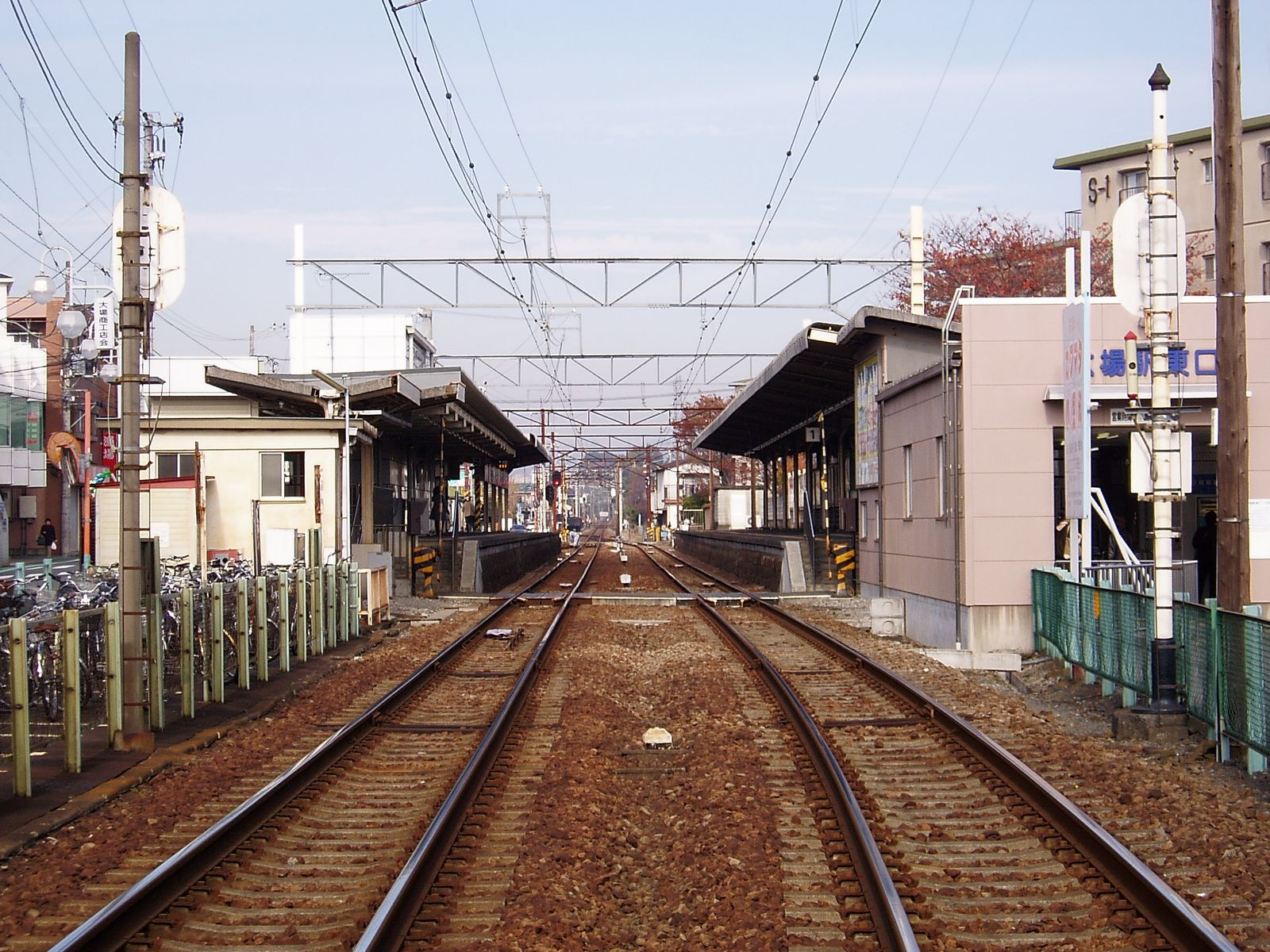
Platforms

Daiba Station (大場駅, Daiba-eki) is a railway station located in an industrial area of the city of Mishima, Shizuoka Prefecture, Japan operated by the private railroad company Izuhakone Railway. The rail yard for the Izuhakone Railway is located at this station.

== Lines ==
Daiba Station is served by the Sunzu Line, and is located 5.5 kilometers from the starting point of the line at Mishima Station.

== Station layout ==
The station has an island platform and a side platform serving three tracks, connected by a level crossing. Platforms 1 and 2 are used for both normal and express traffic. Platform 3 is used primarily during commuting hours, and the track at Platform 3 terminates at Daiba Station. The station building is staffed.

=== Platforms ===
1	■ Sunzu Line	For Izu-Nagaoka, Ōhito and Shuzenji
2	■ Sunzu Line	For Mishima, Odawara, Yokohama, and Tokyo
3	■ Sunzu Line	For Mishima-Hirokōji and Mishima

== History ==
Daiba Station was opened on May 20, 1898, as part of the initial construction phase of the Sunzu Line. The station building was rebuilt in 2005.

== Passenger statistics ==
In fiscal 2017, the station was used by an average of 2488 passengers daily (boarding passengers only).

== Surrounding area ==
- Mishima Minami High School
- Mishima Nakago Junior High School

== See also ==
- List of railway stations in Japan
