= Sano Art Museum =

Coordinates: 35.114944°N 138.915917°E

- 佐野美術館
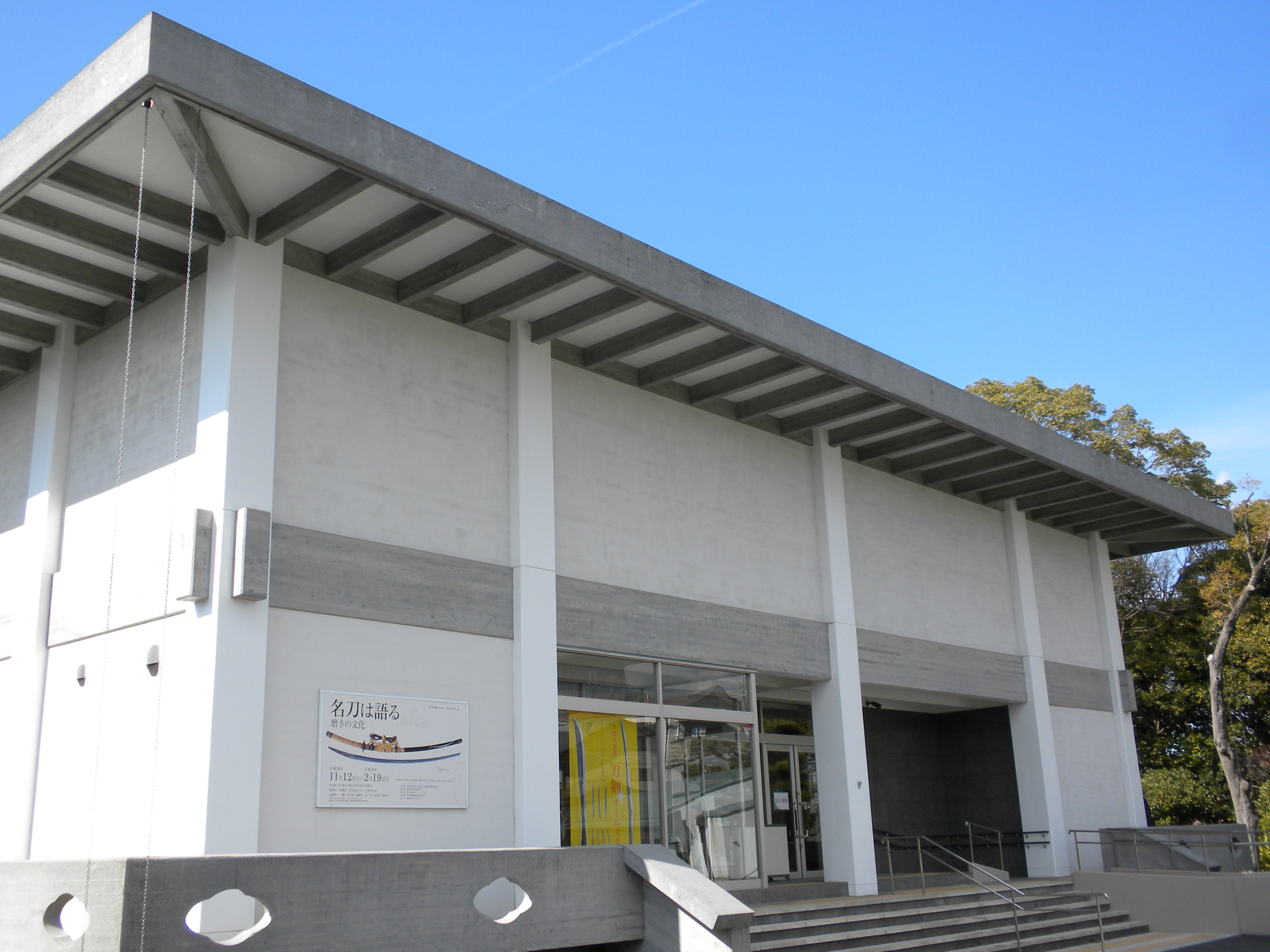
- Entrance to Sano Art Museum

- Location within Shizuoka Prefecture Location within Japan
- Established: 1966
- Location: Mishima, Shizuoka, Japan
- Type: Art museum
- Key holdings: Japanese Swords, sculpture and other Japanese artworks
- Founder: Sano Ryūichi
- Public transit access: Mishima-Tamachi Station (3 min walk)
- Website: www.sanobi.or.jp/eng/index.html

The Sano Art Museum (佐野美術館, Sano Bijutsukan) is a private art museum, located in the Nakata neighborhood of the city of Mishima, Shizuoka Prefecture, central Japan. The museum was founded in 1966 by Mishima-born Sano Ryūichi, founder of the chemical company Tekkōsha and recipient of the Second Order of the Sacred Treasure. The museum has a collection of over 2500 items, and is especially noted for its collection of Japanese swords.

== Cultural properties ==
=== National Treasures ===
The highlight of the Sano Art Museum collection is a naginata halberd from the 14th century Kamakura period. The blade portion has a length of 44.2 cm (17.4 in), and it is signed Made by Nagamitsu of Osafune in Bizen Province (備前国長船住人長光造, Bizen no kuni Osafune-jū Nagamitsu tsukuru). It is designated as a National Treasure

=== Important cultural properties ===
The museum owns various Japanese artworks most notably a number of excellent Japanese swords, some of which have been designated as Important Cultural Property. Other items in the collection include sculptures (one Important Cultural Property), Noh masks, textiles and accessories, ceramics, Japanese dolls, items of calligraphy and paintings.
