= Baraki Station =

Railway station in Izunokuni, Shizuoka Prefecture, Japan

Baraki Station 原木駅
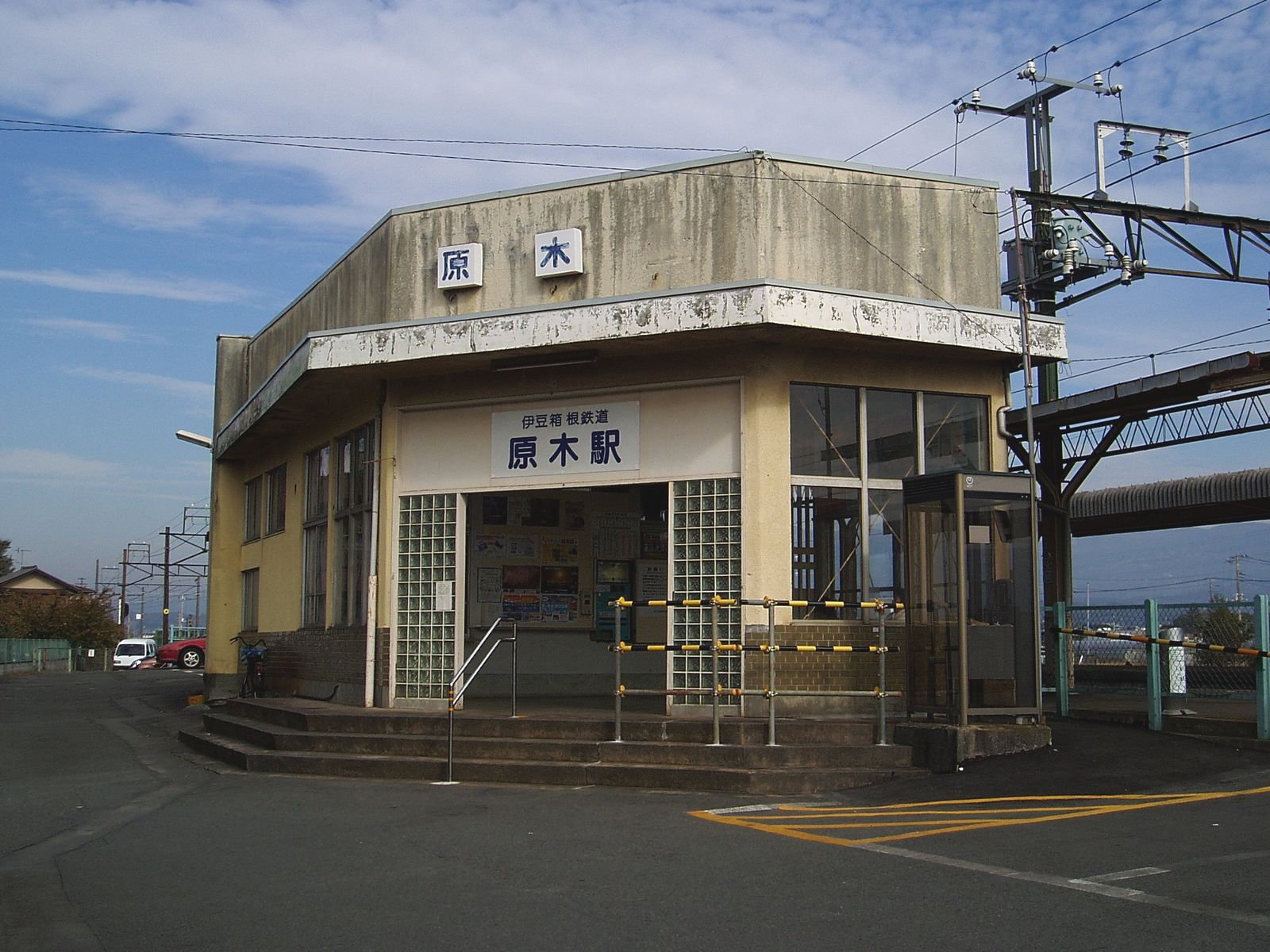
- Baraki Station in November 2007

General information
- Location: Baraki 763-3, Izunokuni City, Shizuoka Prefecture; Japan
- Coordinates: 35°03′55.68″N 138°56′37.04″E
- Operator: Izuhakone Railway
- Line: Sunzu Line
- Distance: 8.5 km (5.3 mi) from Mishima
- Platforms: 2 side platforms
- Tracks: 2

Construction
- Structure type: At grade

Other information
- Status: Staffed
- Station code: IS07
- Website: Official website

History
- Opened: 20 May 1898; 128 years ago

Passengers
- FY2017: 342 daily

Services
Preceding station	Izuhakone Railway	Following station
Nirayama towards Shuzenji	Sunzu Line Local	Izu-Nitta towards Mishima
Location
- Location within Shizuoka Prefecture Location within Central Japan Location within Japan

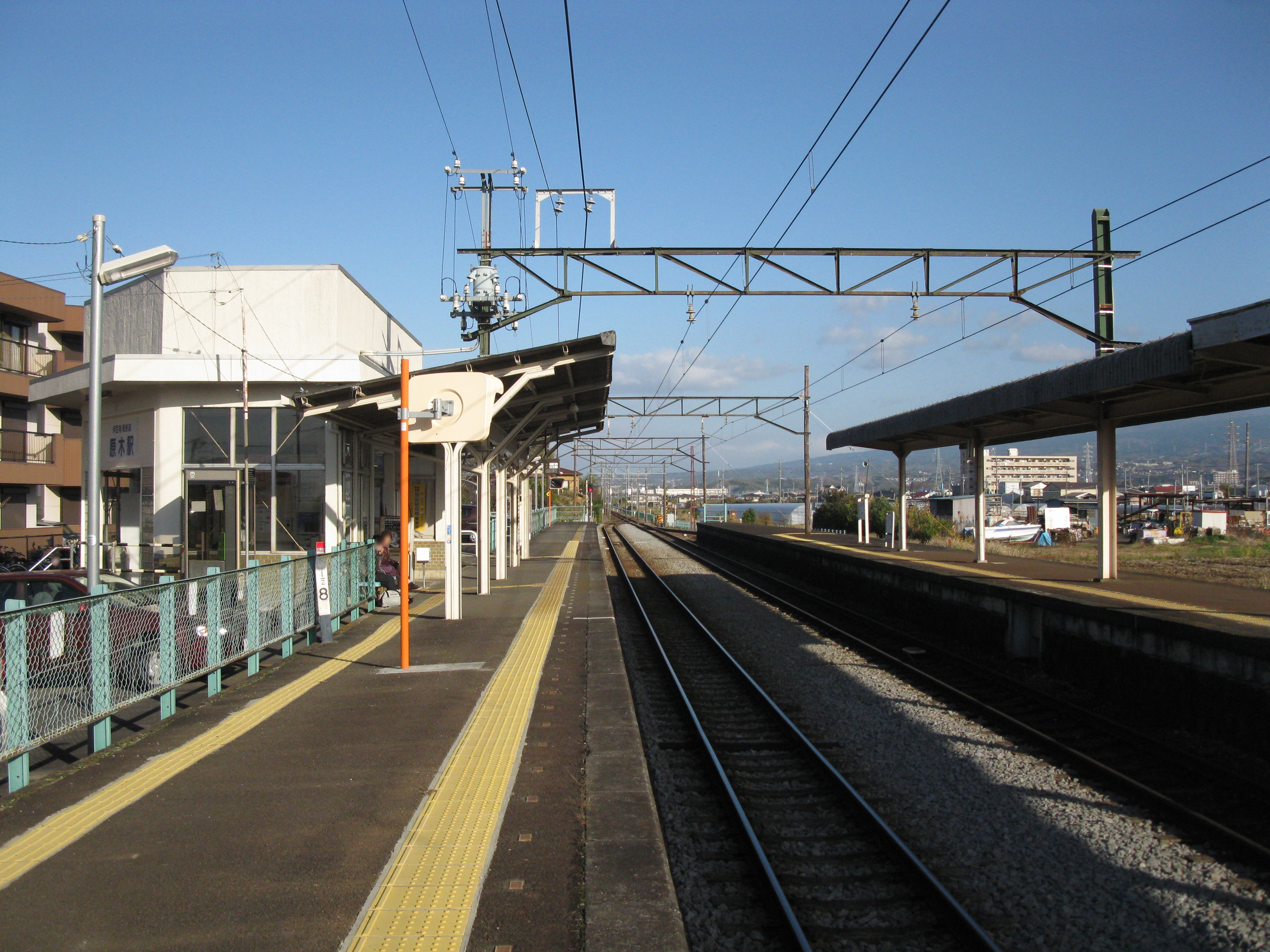
Platforms

Baraki Station (原木駅, Baraki-eki) is a railway station located in the city of Izunokuni, Shizuoka Prefecture, Japan operated by the private railroad company Izuhakone Railway.

== Lines ==
Makinokō Station is served by the Sunzu Line, and is located 8.5 kilometers from the starting point of the line at Mishima Station.

== Station layout ==
Baraki Station has two opposed side platforms connected to the station building by a level crossing. Platform 2 is the primary platform, and is used for bidirectional traffic. Platform 1 is in occasional use only. The station building is unattended and has automatic ticket machines.

=== Platforms ===
1	■ Sunzu Line	For Izu-Nagaoka, Ōhito and Shuzenji
2	■ Sunzu Line	For Izu-Nagaoka, Ōhito and Shuzenji; For Daiba and Mishima

== History ==
Baraki Station was opened on May 20, 1898 as part of the initial construction phase of the Sunzu Line.

== Passenger statistics ==
In fiscal 2017, the station was used by an average of 342 passengers daily (boarding passengers only).

== Surrounding area ==
The station is located in a residential area.

== See also ==
- List of railway stations in Japan
