= Izu-Nitta Station =

Railway station in Kannami, Shizuoka Prefecture, Japan

Izu-Nitta Station 伊豆仁田駅
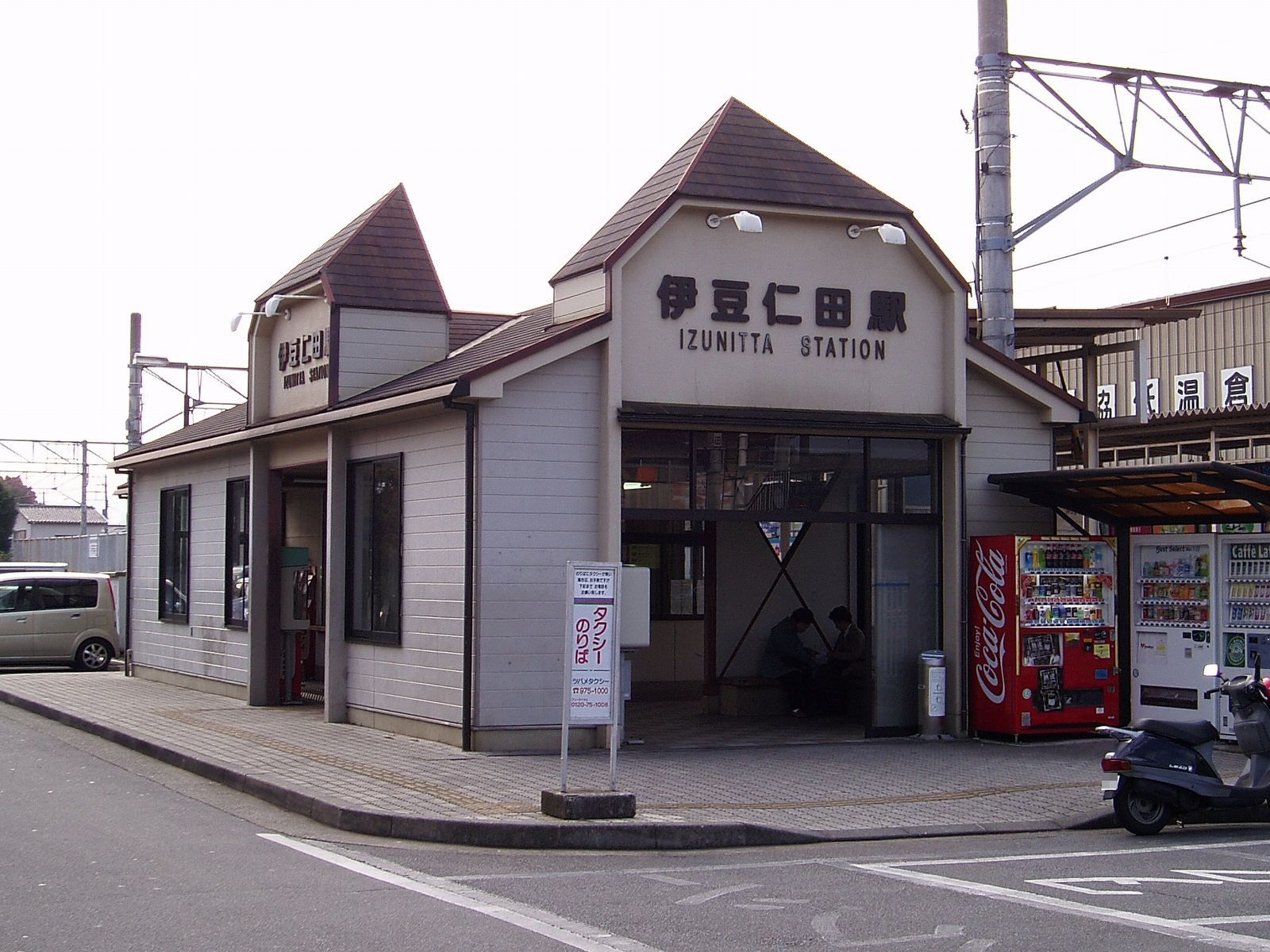
- Exterior of Izu-Nitta Station in October 2007

General information
- Location: Nitta, Kannami Town, Tagata District, Shizuoka Prefecture; Japan
- Coordinates: 35°04′44.80″N 138°56′29.76″E
- Operator: Izuhakone Railway
- Line: Sunzu Line
- Distance: 7.0 km (4.3 mi) from Mishima
- Platforms: 2 side platforms
- Tracks: 2

Construction
- Structure type: At grade

Other information
- Status: Staffed
- Station code: IS06
- Website: Official website

History
- Opened: 30 June 1921; 105 years ago

Passengers
- FY2017: 1,650 daily

Services
Preceding station	Izuhakone Railway	Following station
Baraki towards Shuzenji	Sunzu Line Local	Daiba towards Mishima
Location
- Location within Shizuoka Prefecture Location within Central Japan Location within Japan

Izu-Nitta Station (伊豆仁田駅, Izunitta-eki) is a railway station located in the city of Kannami, Shizuoka Prefecture, Japan operated by the private railroad company Izuhakone Railway.

== Lines ==
Izu-Nitta Station is served by the Sunzu Line, and is located 7.0 kilometers from the starting point of the line at Mishima Station.

== Station layout ==
The station has two opposed side platforms connected by a level crossing. Platform 1 is the primary platform, and used for bidirectional traffic. Platform 2 is used only during commuting hours for traffic to Mishima. The station building is staffed.

=== Platforms ===
1	■ Sunzu Line	For Shuzenji; For Mishima
2	■ Sunzu Line	For Mishima

== History ==
Izu-Nitta Station was opened on June 30, 1921.

== Passenger statistics ==
In fiscal 2017, the station was used by an average of 1650 passengers daily (boarding passengers only).

== Surrounding area ==
- Kannami Elementary School
- Tagata Agricultural High School

== See also ==
- List of railway stations in Japan
