= Takyō Station =

Railway station in Izunokuni, Shizuoka Prefecture, Japan

Takyō Station 田京駅
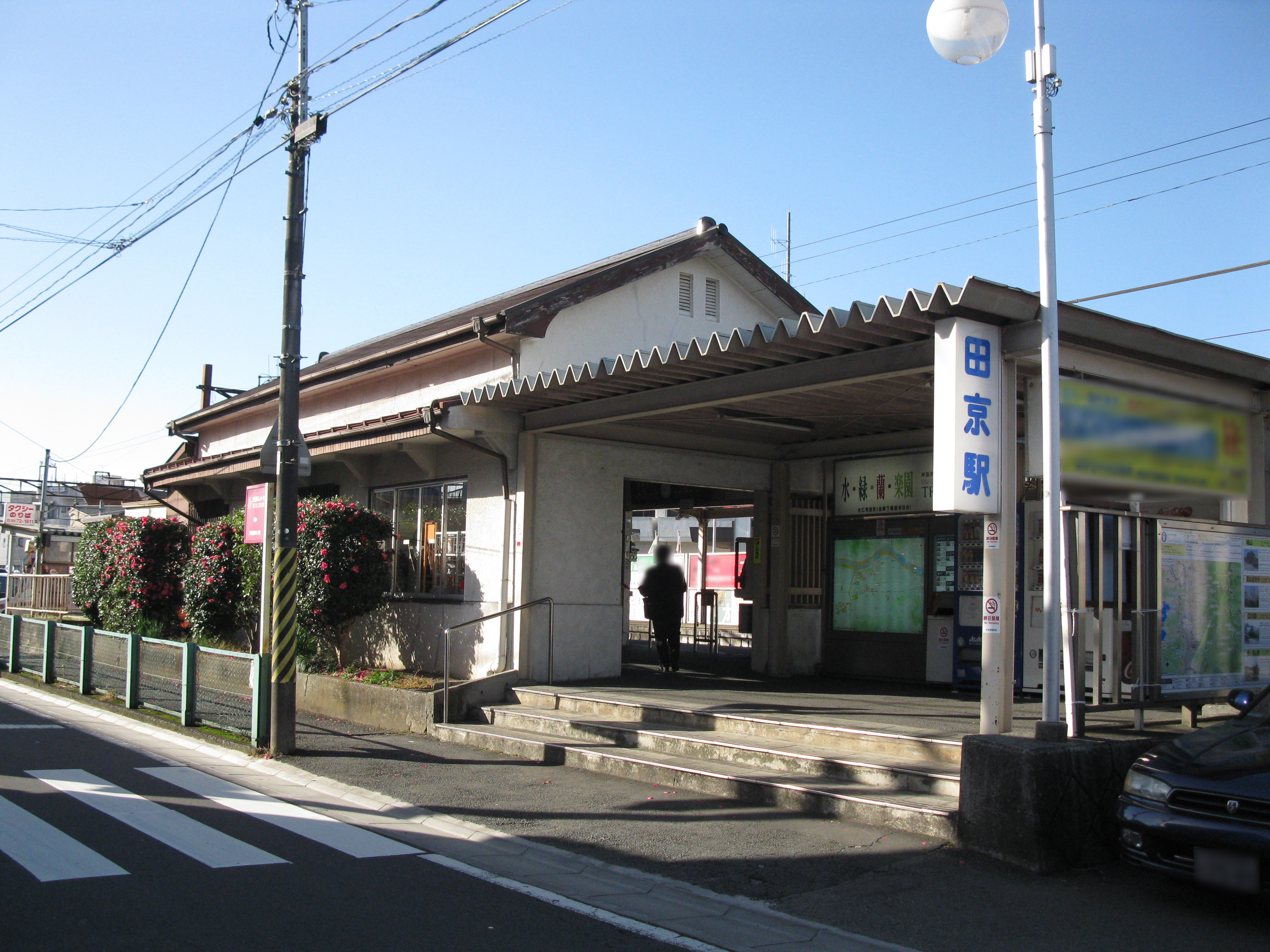
- Takyō Station, December 2010

General information
- Location: 675-3 Takyō, Izunokuni City, Shizuoka Prefecture; Japan
- Coordinates: 35°00′54.12″N 138°56′45.82″E
- Operator: Izuhakone Railway
- Line: Sunzu Line
- Distance: 14.2 km (8.8 mi) from Mishima
- Platforms: 1 side + 1 island platforms
- Tracks: 3

Construction
- Structure type: At grade

Other information
- Status: Staffed
- Station code: IS10
- Website: Official website

History
- Opened: 17 July 1899; 127 years ago

Passengers
- FY2017: 1,292 daily

Services
Preceding station	Izuhakone Railway	Following station
Ōhito towards Shuzenji	Sunzu Line Local	Izu-Nagaoka towards Mishima
Location
- Location within Shizuoka Prefecture Location within Central Japan Location within Japan

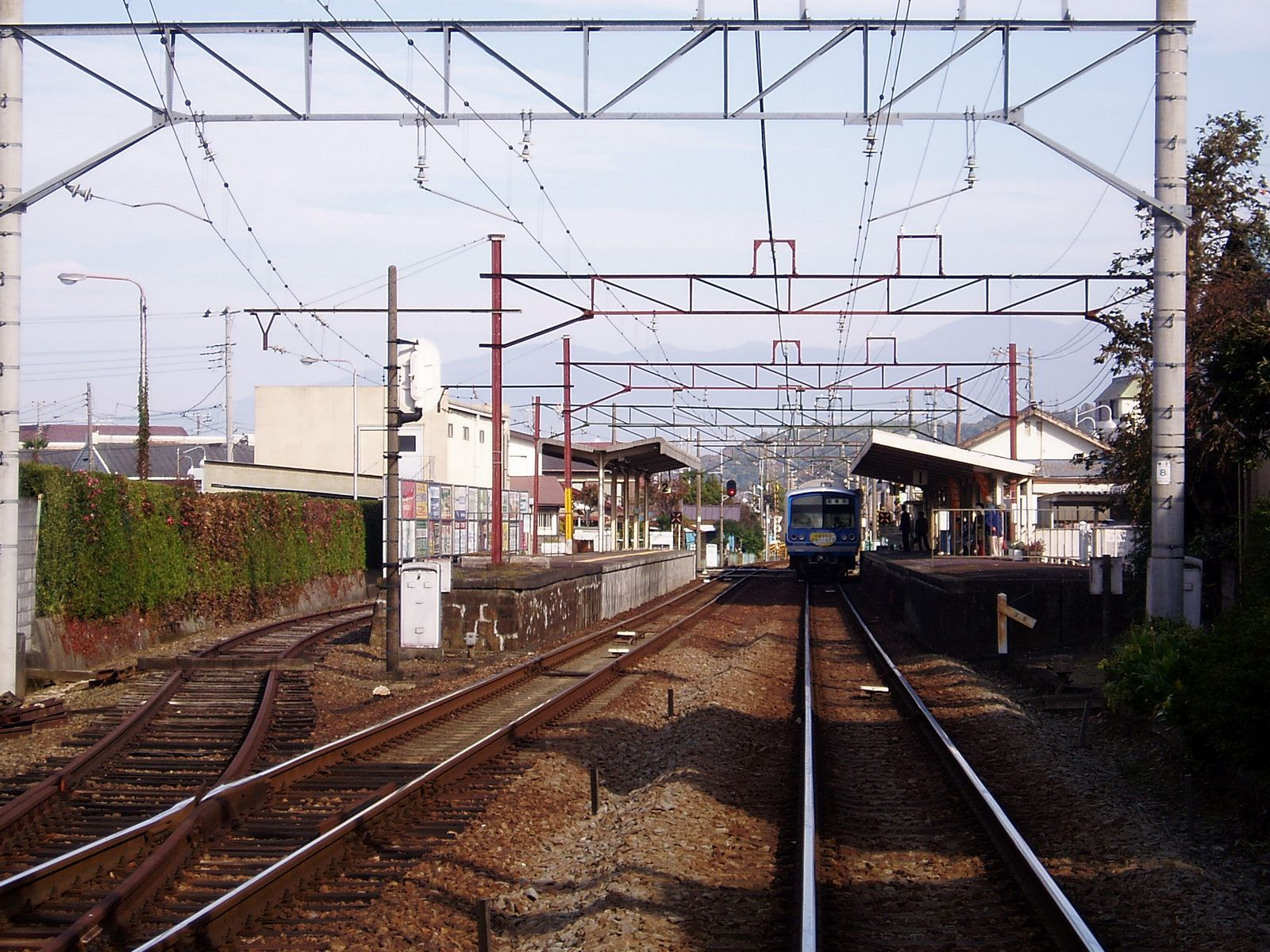
Platforms

Takyō Station (田京駅, Takyō-eki) is a railway station located in the city of Izunokuni, Shizuoka Prefecture, Japan operated by the private railroad company Izuhakone Railway.

== Lines ==
Takyō Station is served by the Sunzu Line, and is located 14.2 kilometers from the starting point of the line at Mishima Station.

== Station layout ==
The station has an island platform and a side platform connected to the station building by a level crossing. The station building has both a staffed service counter and automatic ticket machines.

=== Platforms ===
1	■ Sunzu Line	For Ōhito and Shuzenji
2	■ Sunzu Line	For Izu-Nagaoka, Daiba and Mishima
2	■ Sunzu Line	For Izu-Nagaoka, Daiba and Mishima

== History ==
Takyō Station was opened on July 17, 1899 as part of the extension of the Sunzu line from Nanjō Station (present-day Izu-Nagaoka) to Ōhito.

== Passenger statistics ==
In fiscal 2017, the station was used by an average of 1292 passengers daily (boarding passengers only).

== Surrounding area ==
- former Ohito Town Hall
- Kano River

== See also ==
- List of railway stations in Japan
