= Mishima-Hirokōji Station =

Railway station in Mishima, Shizuoka Prefecture, Japan

Mishima-Hirokōji Station 三島広小路駅
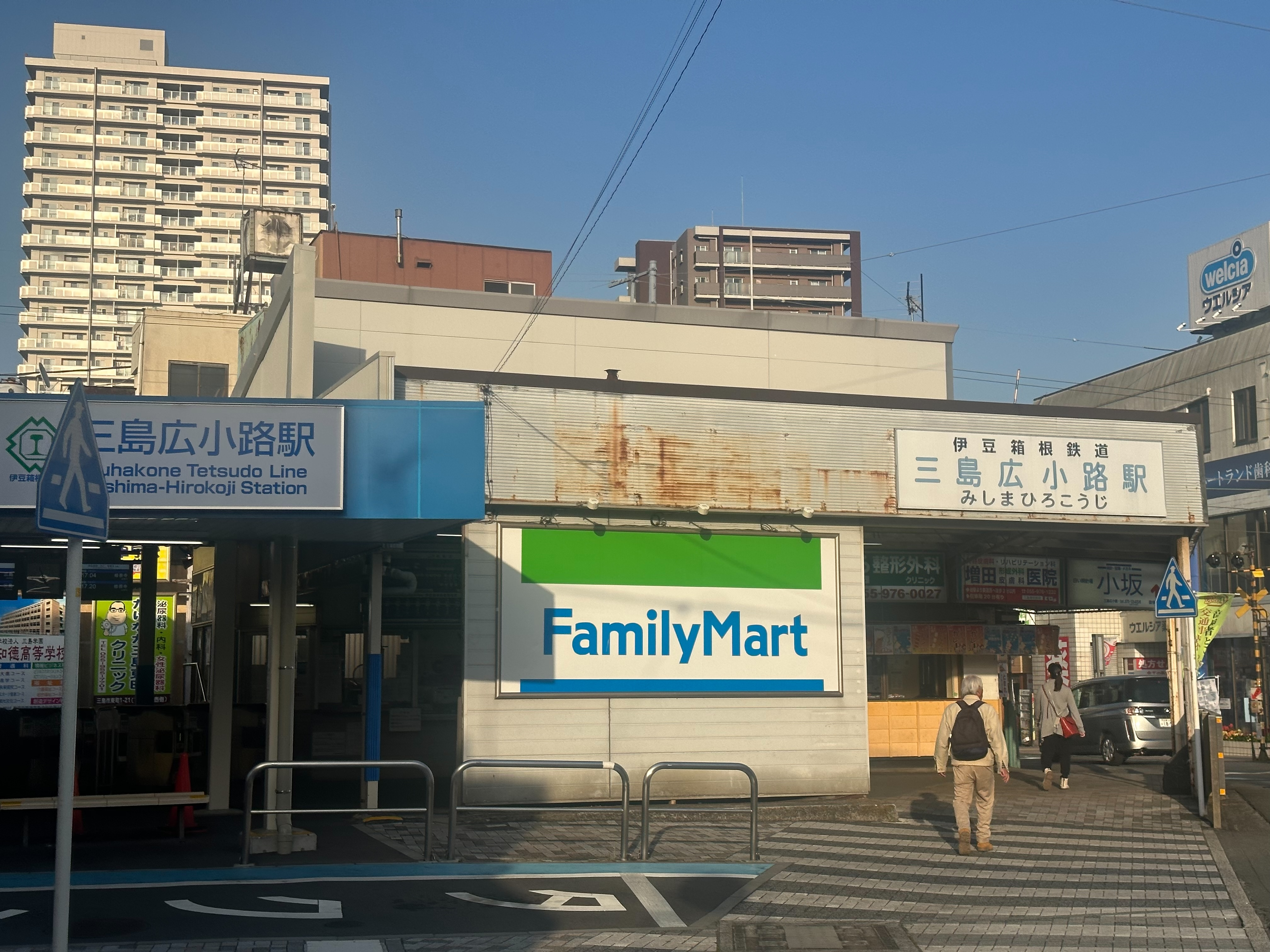
- Exterior of Mishima-Hirokōji Station, 2024

General information
- Location: Hirokōji, Mishima City, Shizuoka Prefecture; Japan
- Coordinates: 35°7′8.48″N 138°54′40.38″E
- Operator: Izuhakone Railway
- Line: Sunzu Line
- Distance: 1.3 km (0.81 mi) from Mishima
- Platforms: 1 side platform
- Tracks: 1

Construction
- Structure type: At grade

Other information
- Status: Staffed
- Station code: IS02
- Website: Official website

History
- Opened: 18 April 1928; 98 years ago

Passengers
- FY2017: 1,953 daily

Services
Preceding station	Izuhakone Railway	Following station
Mishima-Tamachi towards Shuzenji	Sunzu Line	Mishima Terminus
Location
- Location within Shizuoka Prefecture Location within Central Japan Location within Japan

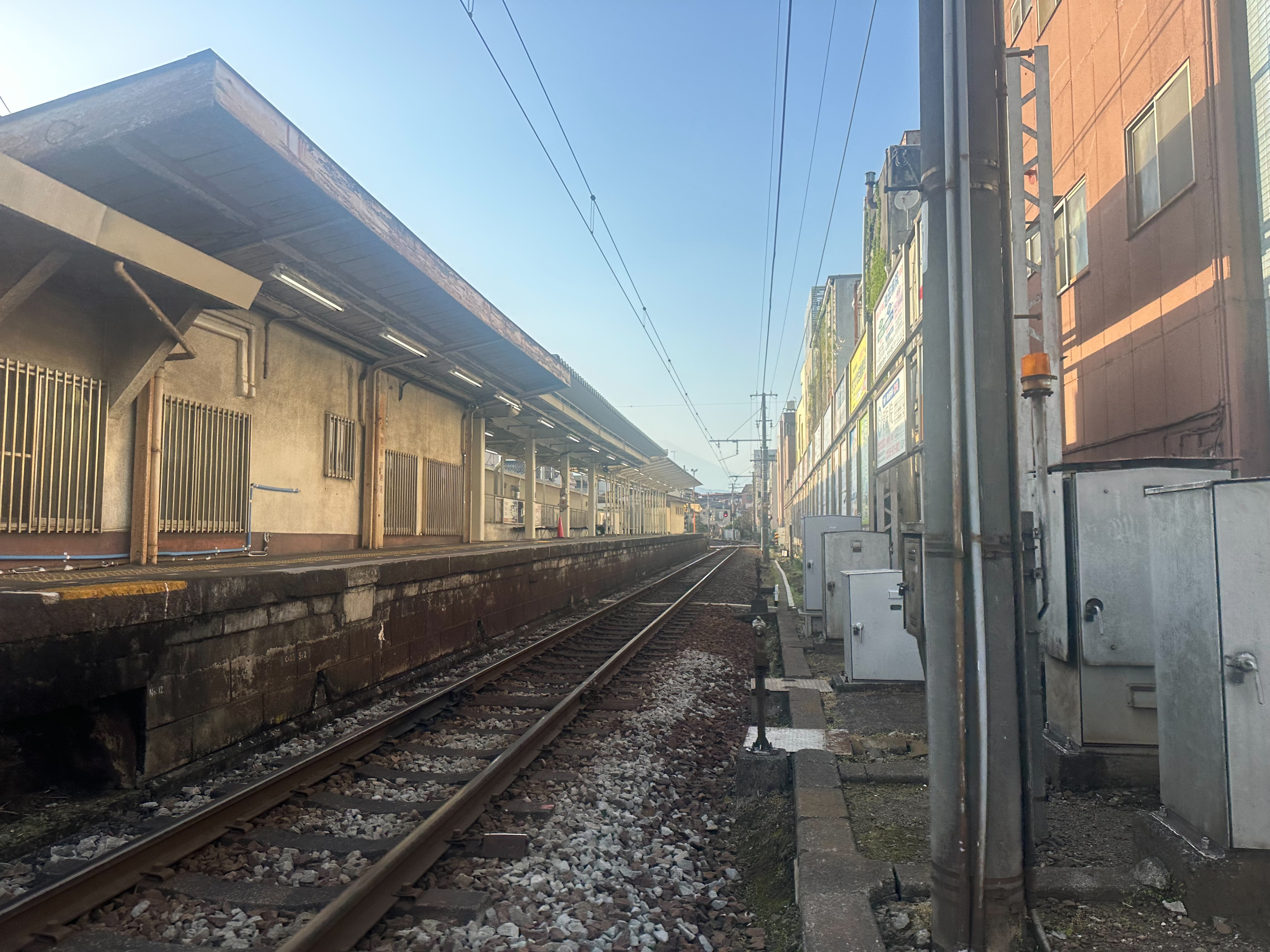
Platform, 2024

Mishima-Hirokōji Station (三島広小路駅, Mishimahirokōji-eki) is a railway station located in the city of Mishima, Shizuoka Prefecture, Japan operated by the private railroad company Izuhakone Railway.

== Lines ==
Mishima-Hirokōji Station is served by the Sunzu Line, and is located 1.3 kilometers from the starting point of the line at Mishima Station.

== Station layout ==
The station has one side platform serving a single track. The station building is staffed.

== History ==
Mishima-Hirokōji Station was opened on April 18, 1928. Located in downtown Mishima, it is primarily used by commuter traffic, except during the annual Mishima Matsuri.

== Passenger statistics ==
In fiscal 2017, the station was used by an average of 1953 passengers daily (boarding passengers only).

== Surrounding area ==
- Izu Kokubun-ji ruins

== See also ==
- List of railway stations in Japan
