= Makinokō Station =

Railway station in Izu, Shizuoka Prefecture, Japan

Makinokō Station 牧之郷駅
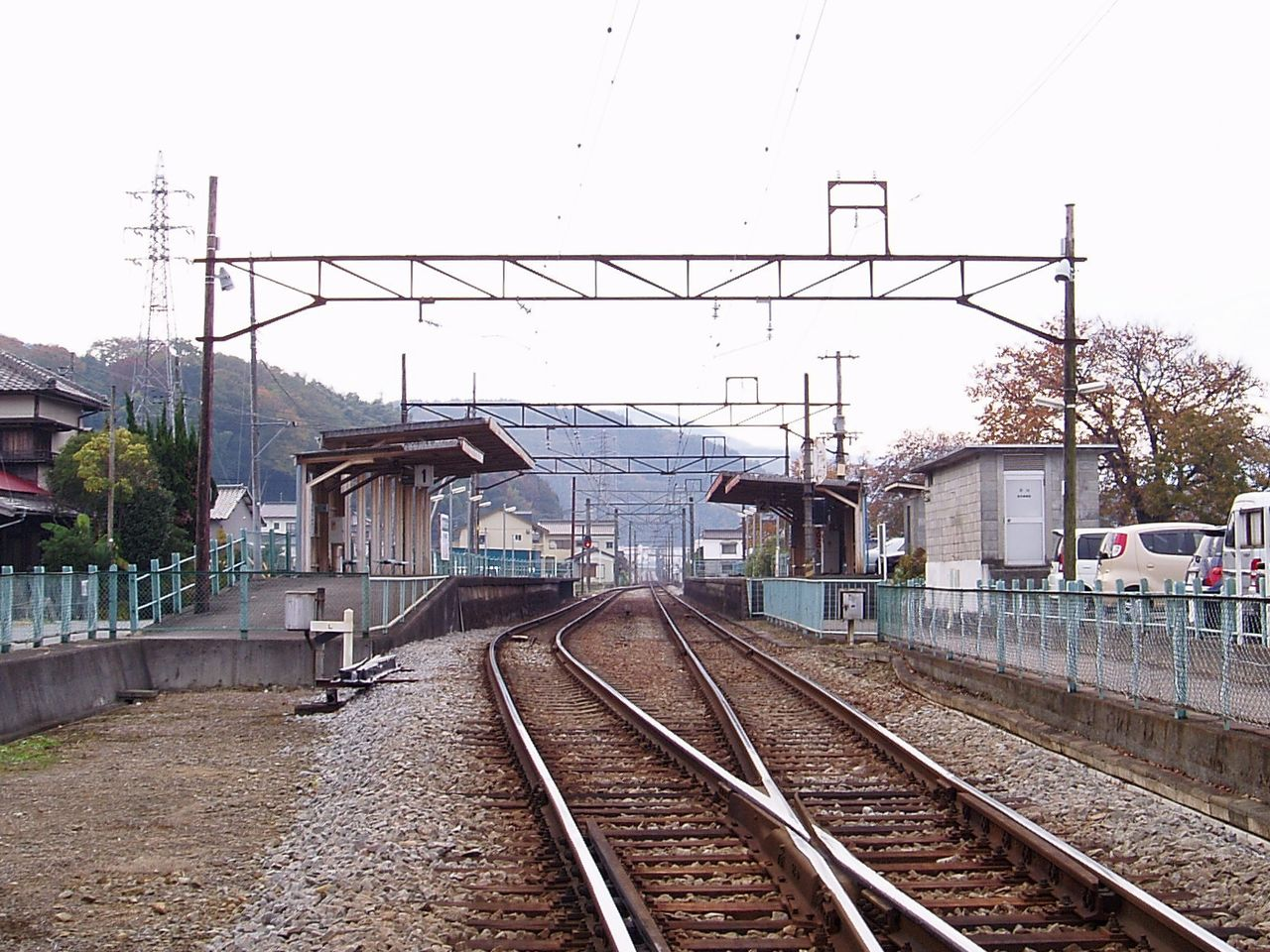
- Exterior of Makinokō Station in November 2007

General information
- Location: Makinokō, Izushi, Shizuoka-ken; Japan
- Coordinates: 34°59′19.15″N 138°57′15.68″E
- Operator: Izuhakone Railway
- Line: Sunzu Line
- Distance: 18.6 km (11.6 mi) from Mishima
- Platforms: 2 side platforms
- Tracks: 2

Construction
- Structure type: At grade

Other information
- Status: Staffed
- Station code: IS12
- Website: Official website

History
- Opened: 1 August 1924; 102 years ago

Passengers
- FY2017: 228 daily

Services
Preceding station	Izuhakone Railway	Following station
Shuzenji Terminus	Sunzu Line Local	Ōhito towards Mishima
Location
- Location within Shizuoka Prefecture Location within Central Japan Location within Japan

Makinokō Station (牧之郷駅, Makinokō-eki) is a railway station located in the city of Izu, Shizuoka Prefecture, Japan operated by the private railroad company Izuhakone Railway.

== Lines ==
Makinokō Station is served by the Sunzu Line, and is located 18.6 kilometers from the starting point of the line at Mishima Station.

== Station layout ==
The station has two opposed side platforms connected to the station building by a level crossing. The station building is unattended and has automatic ticket machines.

=== Platforms ===
1	■ Sunzu Line	Westbound (For Shuzenji)
2	■ Sunzu Line	Eastbound (For Izu-Nagaoka, Daiba and Mishima)

== History ==
Makinokō Station was opened on August 1, 1924, as part of the final extension of the Sunzu line from Ōhito to its present terminus at Shuzenji.

== Passenger statistics ==
In fiscal 2017, the station was used by an average of 228 passengers daily (boarding passengers only).

== Surrounding area ==
- Kano River

== See also ==
- List of railway stations in Japan
