= Ōhito Station =

Railway station in Izunokuni, Shizuoka Prefecture, Japan

Ōhito Station 大仁駅
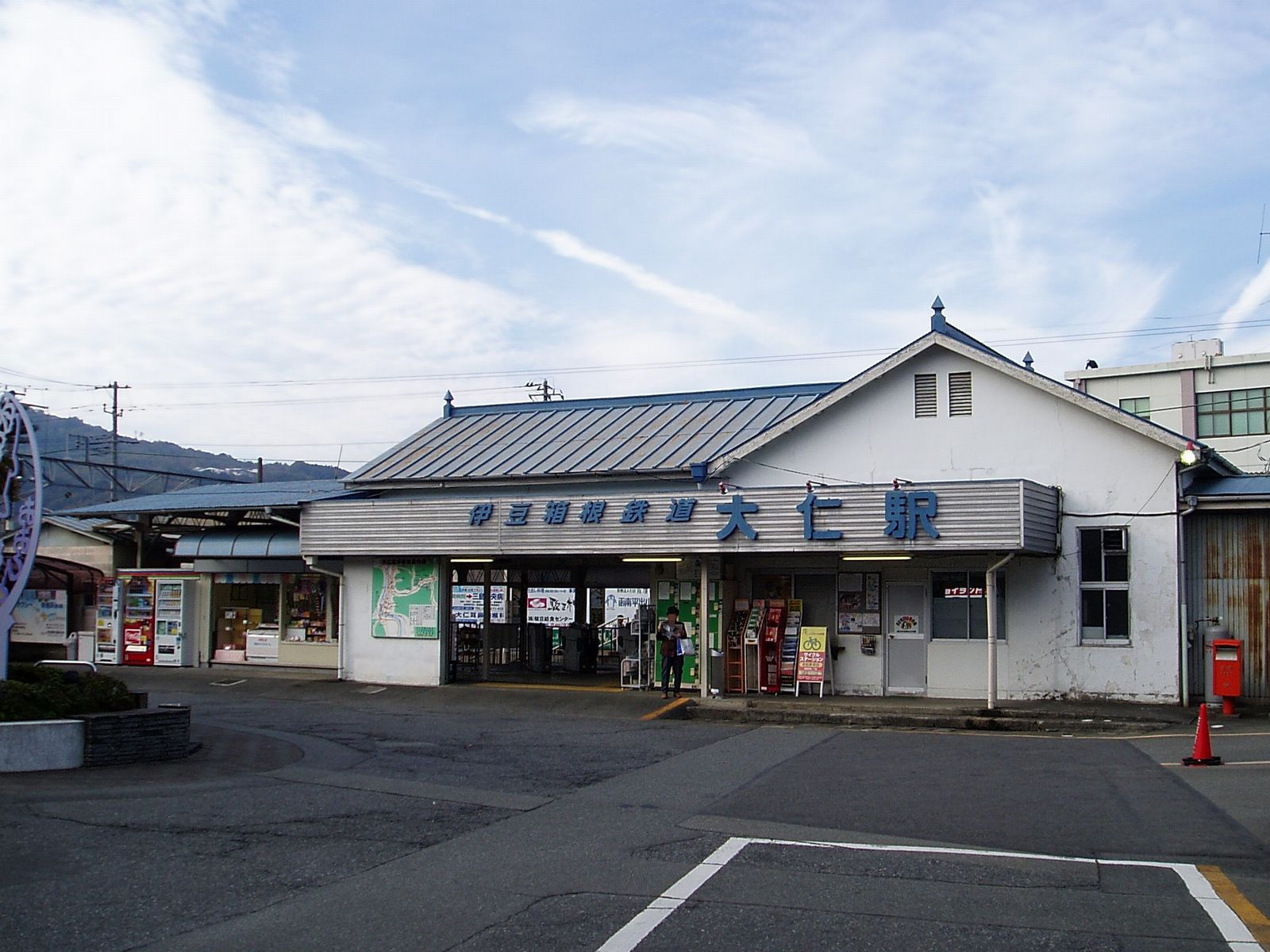
- Ōhito Station in November 2007

General information
- Location: Ōhito 584, Izunokuni-shi, Shizuoka-ken; Japan
- Coordinates: 34°59′40.27″N 138°56′15.52″E
- Operator: Izuhakone Railway
- Line: Sunzu Line
- Distance: 16.6 km (10.3 mi) from Mishima
- Platforms: 1 side + 1 island platforms
- Tracks: 3

Construction
- Structure type: At grade

Other information
- Status: Staffed
- Station code: IS11
- Website: Official website

History
- Opened: 17 July 1899; 127 years ago

Passengers
- FY2017: 1,255 daily

Services
Preceding station	Izuhakone Railway	Following station
Makinokō towards Shuzenji	Sunzu Line Local	Takyō towards Mishima
Shuzenji Terminus	Odoriko	Izu-Nagaoka towards Tokyo
Location
- Location within Shizuoka Prefecture Location within Central Japan Location within Japan

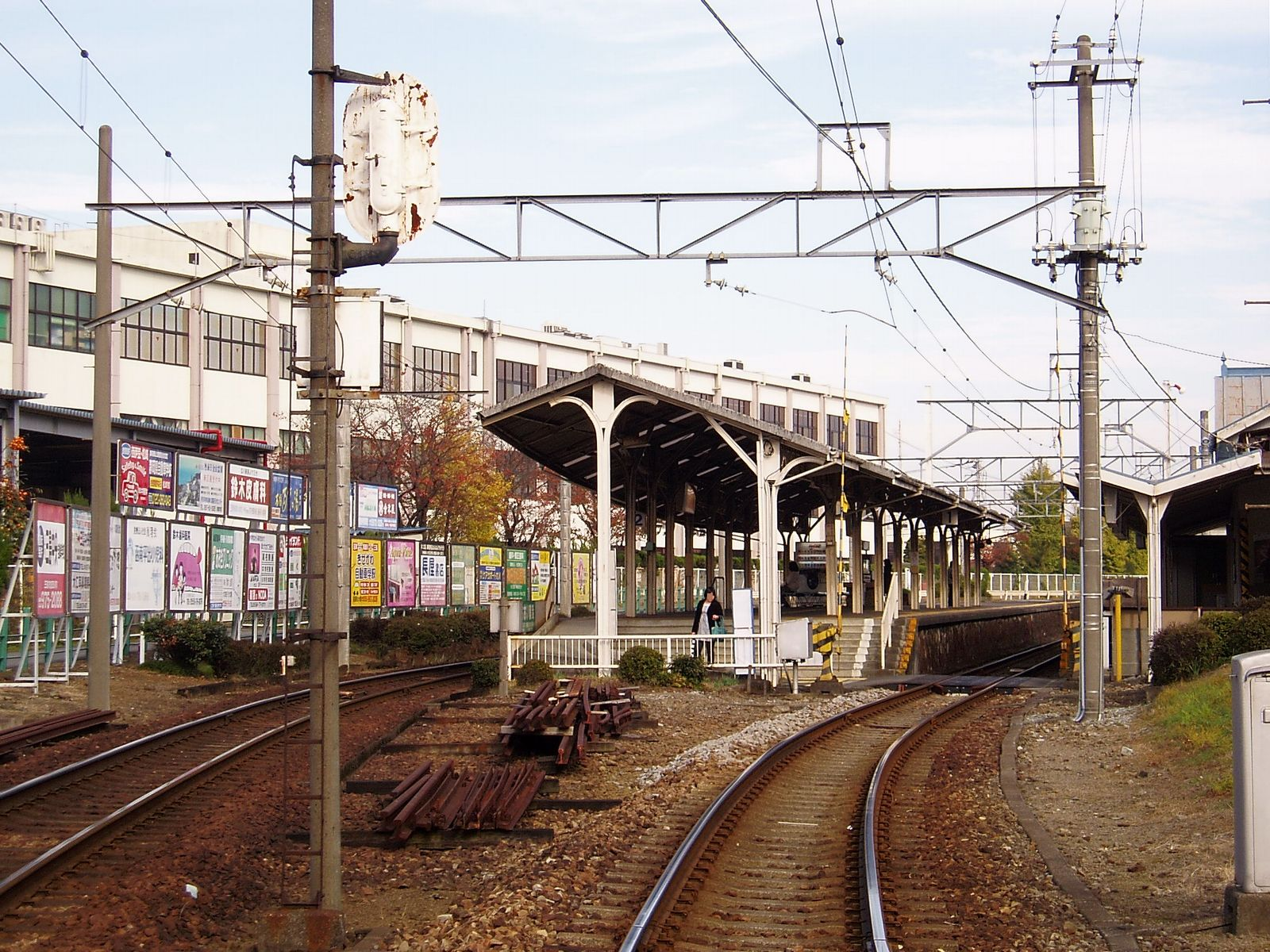
Platforms

Ōhito Station (大仁駅, Ōhito-eki) is a railway station located in the city of Izunokuni, Shizuoka Prefecture, Japan operated by the private railroad company Izuhakone Railway.

== Lines ==
Ōhito Station is served by the Sunzu Line, and is located 16.6 kilometers from the starting point of the line at Mishima Station.

== Station layout ==
The station has an island platform and a side platform connected to the station building by a level crossing. The station building has both a staffed service counter and automatic ticket machines.

=== Platforms ===
1	■ Sunzu Line	For Shuzenji
2	■ Sunzu Line	For Izu-Nagaoka, Daiba and Mishima

== History ==
Ōhito Station was opened on July 17, 1899 as part of the extension of the Sunzu line from Nanjō Station (present-day Izu-Nagaoka. The line was further extended to its present terminus at Shuzenji in 1924.

== Passenger statistics ==
In fiscal 2017, the station was used by an average of 1255 passengers daily (boarding passengers only).

== Surrounding area ==
- Ōhito onsen
- Ōhito High School

== See also ==
- List of railway stations in Japan
