= Odoriko =

Japanese limited express train service

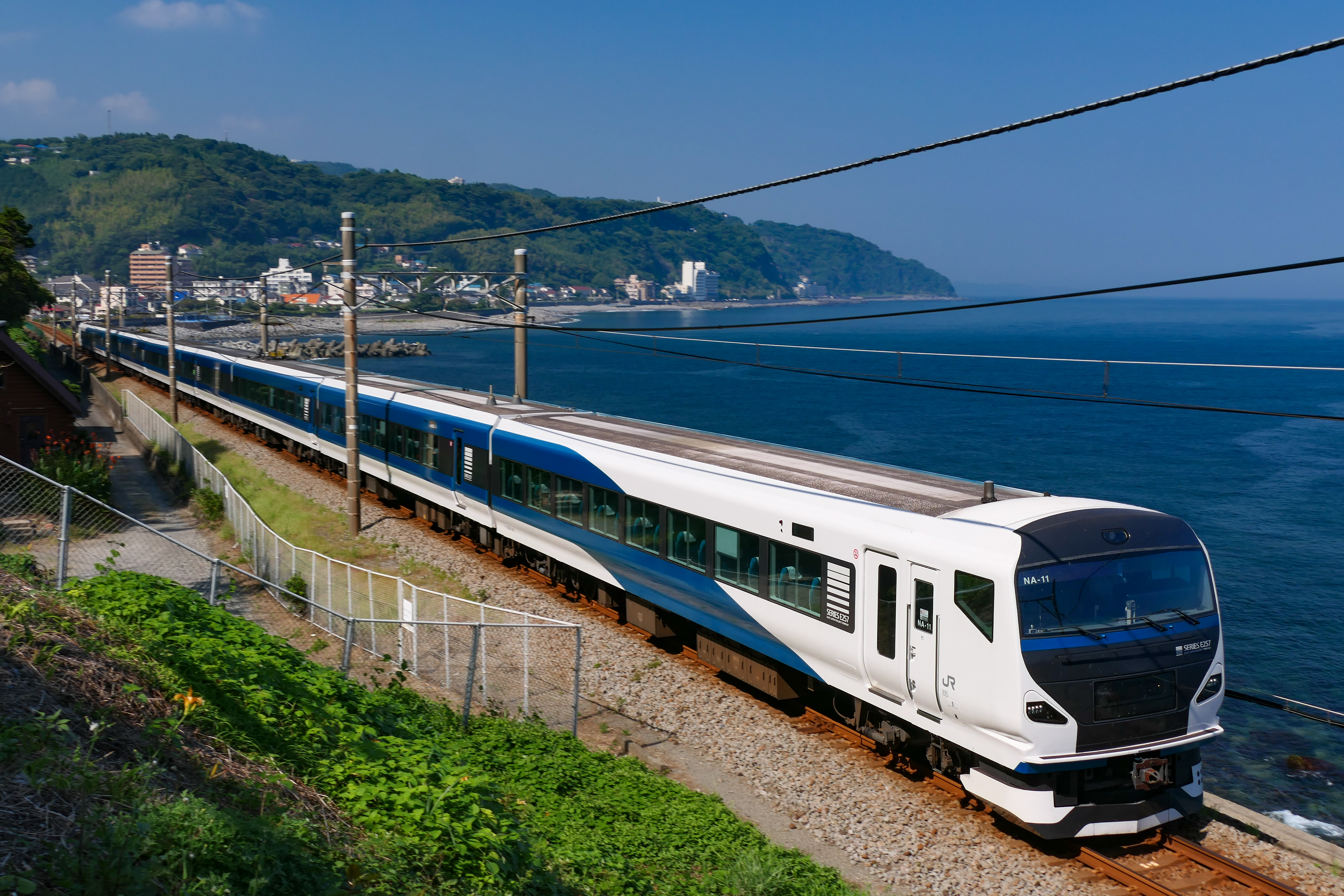
- E257-2000 series Odoriko, August 2021

Overview
- Service type: Limited express
- Locale: Tokyo, Kanagawa Prefecture, and Shizuoka Prefecture
- First service: 1 October 1981 (Odoriko); 28 April 1990 (Super View Odoriko); 1 December 2012 (Marine Express Odoriko); 14 March 2020 (Saphir Odoriko)
- Last service: 13 March 2020 (Super View Odoriko; Marine Express Odoriko)
- Current operators: East Japan Railway Company (JR East); Central Japan Railway Company (JR Central); Izukyu Corporation; Izuhakone Railway
- Former operator: JNR

Route
- Termini: Tokyo or Ikebukuro; Izukyu-Shimoda or Shuzenji
- Lines used: Tōkaidō Main Line; Itō Line; Izu Kyūkō Line; Sunzu Line

On-board services
- Class: Standard + Green

Technical
- Rolling stock: E257-2000 series EMU (Odoriko); E261 series EMU (Saphir Odoriko)
- Track gauge: 1,067 mm (3 ft 6 in)
- Electrification: 1,500 V DC overhead
- Operating speed: 110 km/h (70 mph) (Odoriko); 120 km/h (75 mph) (Saphir Odoriko)

Odoriko (Japanese: 踊り子; lit. 'dancing girl') is a limited express train service in Japan operated by the East Japan Railway Company (JR East), Central Japan Railway Company (JR Central), Izukyu Corporation, and Izuhakone Railway, which runs between Tokyo and Izukyū-Shimoda or Shuzenji in Shizuoka Prefecture.

== Summary ==
The Odoriko started service from October 1981, with the then-new 185 series rolling stock, replacing the earlier Amagi limited express (run by the 183 series) and the Izu express (run by the 153 series). After that, the Super View Odoriko also operated from April 1990 to 13 March 2020, with the 251 series rolling stock. On 14 March 2020, Saphir Odoriko started service using E261 series EMUs.

== Regular services ==
=== Odoriko ===
Three services operate back and forth every day between Tokyo and Izukyū Shimoda Station along the Tōkaidō Main Line, Itō Line, and Izu Kyūkō Line, two of which are coupled with services that go to Shuzenji along the Izuhakone Railway Sunzu Line (decoupled at Atami). Vending services are available between Tokyo and Itō, but aren't available aboard seasonal services.

Aside from that, there are seasonal services running from Shinjuku or Ikebukuro that run along the Shōnan–Shinjuku Line, converging at Yokohama. Also, with the Ueno–Tokyo Line opening in March 2015, there are further services running from Abiko via the Jōban Line, and also from Omiya via the Utsunomiya Line, both going through Ueno and Tokyo before continuing to Izukyu-Shimoda.

==== Stations served ====
Tokyo ー Izukyu-Shimoda:
Tokyo ー Shinagawa ー Kawasaki ー Yokohama ー Ofuna ー Odawara ー Yugawara ー Atami ー Ajiro ー Ito ー Izu-Kogen ー Izu-Atagawa ー Izu-Inatori ー Kawazu ー Izukyu-Shimoda
Atami ー Shuzenji:
(Coupled, and continue on towards Tokyo) ー Atami ー Mishima ー Mishima-Tamachi ー Daiba ー Izu-Nagaoka ー Ohito ー Shuzenji

===== Seasonal services =====
Ikebukuro ー Yokohama:
Ikebukuro ー Shinjuku ー Shibuya ー Musashi-Kosugi ー Yokohama ー (Continue on towards Izukyu-Shimoda)
Abiko ー Tokyo:
Abiko ー Kashiwa ー Matsudo ー Kita-Senju ー Ueno ー Tokyo ー (Continue on towards Izukyu-Shimoda)
Omiya ー Tokyo:
Omiya ー Urawa ー Akabane ー Ueno ー Tokyo ー (Continue on towards Izukyu-Shimoda)

==== Formation ====
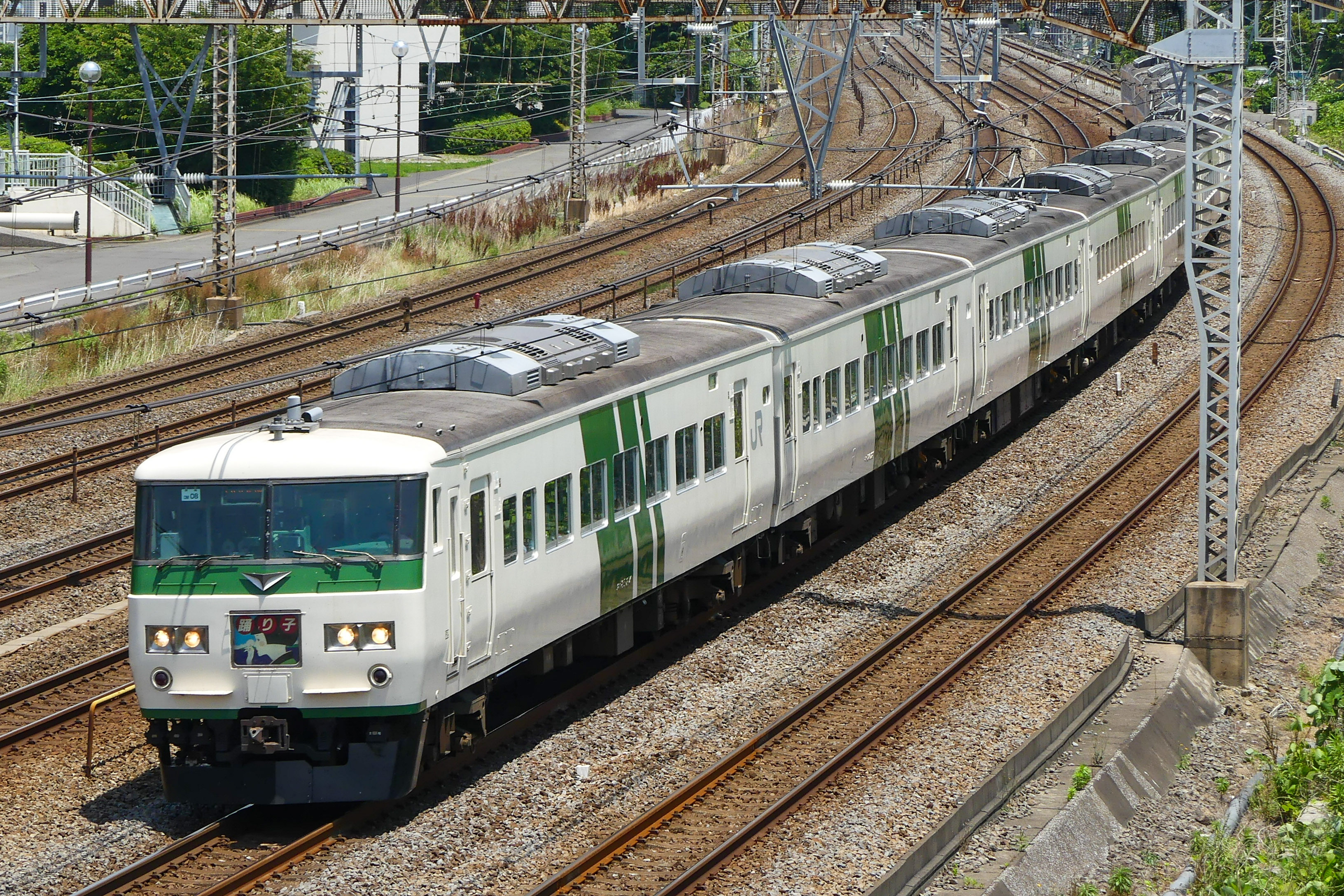
JR East 185 series Odoriko service on the Tōkaidō Main Line, in 2017

Services are now operated on E257 series EMUs.

On the now retired 185 series, the 15 car formation made the Odoriko the longest Limited Express train running in Japan (excluding shinkansen trains). They were formed as follows, with car 1 at the Izukyū-Shimoda/Shuzenji end.

185 series (7+5 cars)
Car No.	1	2	3	4	5	6	7	11	12	13	14	15
Accommodation	Reserved	Reserved	Reserved	Green	Reserved	Non-reserved	Non-reserved	Non-reserved	Non-reserved	Reserved	Reserved	Reserved
Set	Basic set							Additional set				

185 series (10+5 cars)
Car No.	1	2	3	4	5	6	7	8	9	10	11	12	13	14	15
Accommodation	Reserved	Reserved	Reserved	Green	Green	Reserved	Reserved	Reserved	Non-reserved	Non-reserved	Non-reserved	Non-reserved	Reserved	Reserved	Reserved
Set	Basic set										Additional set				

=== Saphir Odoriko ===
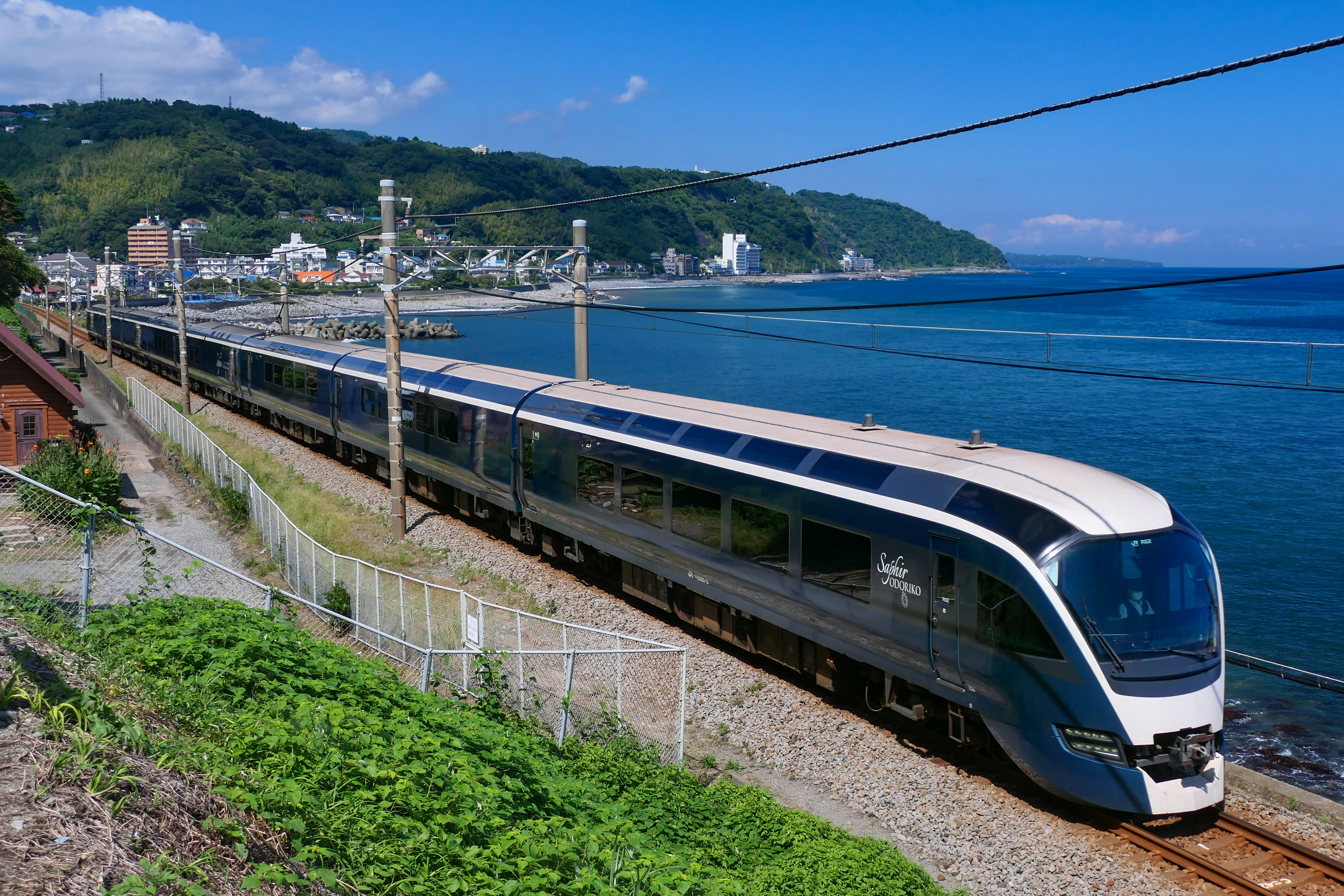
E261 series train set on the Izu Kyūkō Line

The Saphir Odoriko (Japanese: サフィール踊り子) commenced operations on 14 March 2020 to replace the Super View Odoriko as an ultra-deluxe version of the regular Odoriko. One Saphir Odoriko service runs to and from Tokyo station daily. During the peak travel season, an additional service runs from Tokyo during weekdays, and runs from Shinjuku during weekends.

Stations served

Tokyo - Izukyu-Shimoda

Tokyo - Shinagawa - Yokohama - Atami - Ito - Izu-Kogen - Izu-Atagawa -Izu-Inatori - Kawazu - Izukyu-Shimoda

Shinjuku > Izukyu-Shimoda (seasonal service)

Shinjuku - Shibuya - Musashi-Kosugi - Yokohama - Atami - Ito - Izu-Kogen - Izu-Atagawa - Izu-Inatori - Kawazu - Izukyu-Shimoda

- Seasonal service from Shinjuku (Saphir Odoriko 5) does not have return service to Shinjuku, service will return towards Tokyo (Saphir Odoriko 4)

Formation

Trains are operated by E261 series trainsets. The trains feature all Green Cars, with Car 1 designated as a 'Premium Green Car' with 2 large reclining seats per row.

The Saphir Odoriko does not operate from Ikebukuro, Omiya or Abiko as the former Super View Odoriko used to. These services were consolidated with the regular Odoriko services.

== Temporary services ==
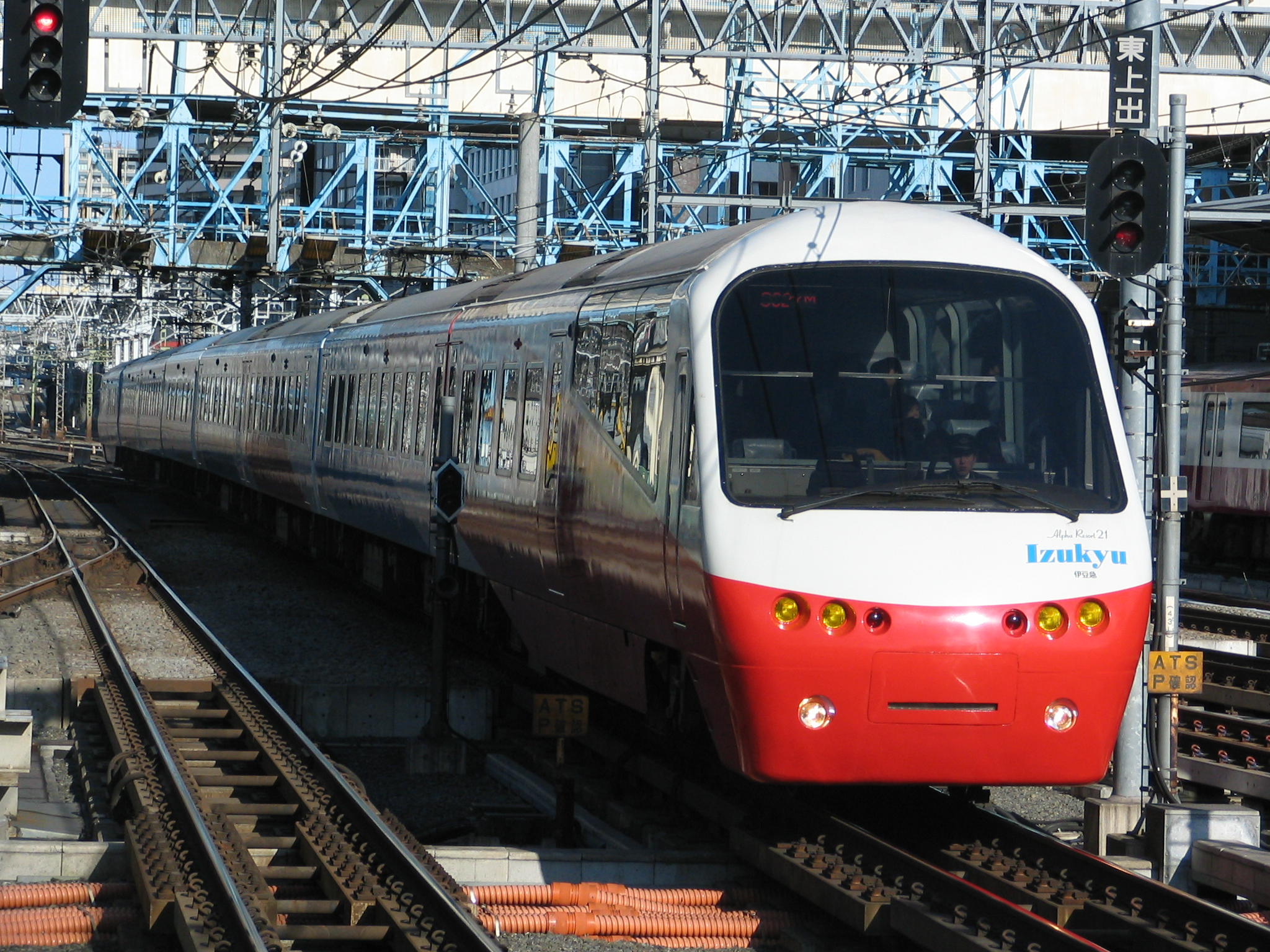
Izu Kyuko 2100 series EMU on a Resort Odoriko service at Yokohama Station

=== Resort Odoriko ===
The Resort Odoriko (Japanese: リゾート踊り子) is a temporary service, which operates between Tokyo and Izukyū-Shimoda. The service normally consists of one outbound journey to Izukyu-Shimoda at special holidays only.

==== Stations served ====
Tokyo ー Izukyu-Shimoda:
Tokyo ー Yokohama ー Ofuna ー Odawara ー Yugawara ー Atami ー Ajiro ー Ito ー Izu-Kogen ー Izu-Atagawa ー Izu-Inatori ー Kawazu ー Izukyu-Shimoda

==== Formation ====
Resort Odoriko services operate using Izukyū 2100 series "Resort 21" 8-car EMUs, formed as shown below, where car 1 at the Izukyū-Shimoda end, and car 8 at the Tokyo end.

Izukyu 2100 series "Resort 21" (8 cars)
Car No.	1	2	3	4	5	6	7	8
Accommodation	Reserved, Observation deck	Reserved	Reserved	Reserved	Green	Reserved	Reserved	Reserved, Observation deck

== Former services ==
=== Super View Odoriko ===
The Super View Odoriko (Japanese: スーパービュー踊り子) was the first deluxe version of the Odoriko operated from 28 April 1990 to 13 March 2020. It used 251 series 10-car EMUs and ran between Tokyo or Ikebukuro and Izukyū-Shimoda. The service was originally scheduled to commence from the start of the revised timetable on 10 March 1990, but rolling stock delivery delays meant that services were substituted by regular Odoriko services using 185 series EMUs.

On weekdays, one train operated from Shinjuku to Izukyu-Shimoda, 2 trains operated back and forth between Tokyo and Izukyu-Shimoda, and one train operated from Izukyu-Shimoda to Ikebukuro each day.

On weekends, the Shinjuku-originating train changed originating station to Ikebukuro. Aside from that, services from Shinjuku to Izukyu-Shimoda and from Izukyu-Shimoda to Tokyo operated once a day. Moreover, during busy seasons, there were numerous extra services, with one extended service between Omiya and Izukyu-Shimoda, which ran along the Shonan-Shinjuku Line from Omiya to Yokohama; 2 trains from Tokyo to Izukyu-Shimoda, with only 1 returning to Tokyo; and one train from Izukyu-Shimoda to Shinjuku.

==== Stations served ====
Stations in brackets meant that some services made stop there.

Tokyo ー Izukyu-Shimoda:
Tokyo ー (Shinagawa) ー Yokohama ー (Odawara) ー (Yugawara) ー Atami ー (Ajiro) ー Ito ー Izu-Kogen ー Izu-Atagawa ー Izu-Inatori ー Kawazu ー Izukyu-Shimoda
- Only Super View Odoriko No. 5 and No. 8 stopped at Shinagawa.
- Only Super View Odoriko No. 2 and No. 11 stopped at Odawara, Yugawara and Ajiro.
Ikebukuro ー Yokohama:
Ikebukuro ー Shinjuku ー Musashi-Kosugi ー Yokohama ー (Continue on towards Izukyu-Shimoda)

===== Temporary services =====
Omiya ー Ikebukuro:
Omiya ー Urawa ー Akabane ー Ikebukuro ー (Continue on towards Izukyu-Shimoda)

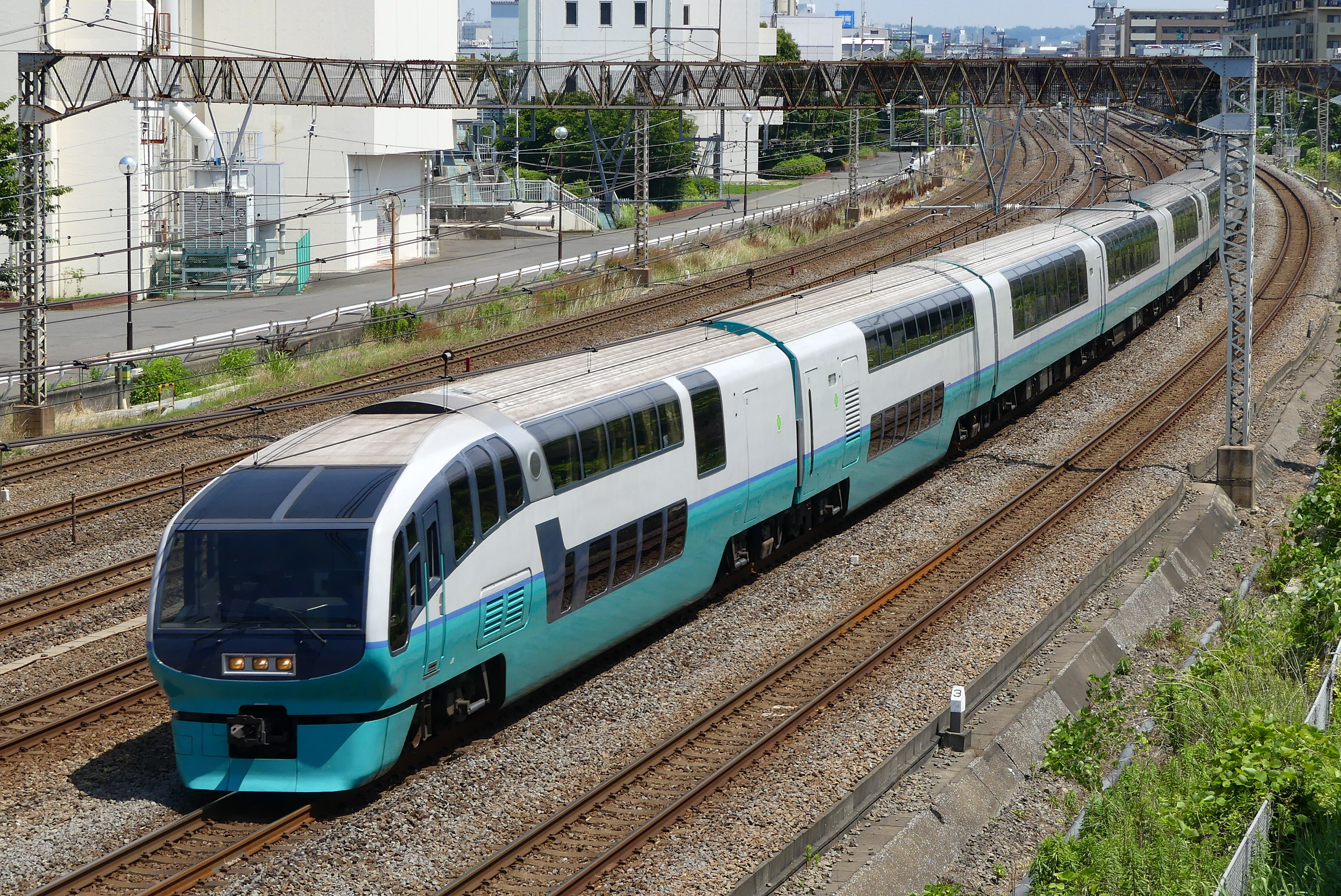
JR East 251 series EMU on a Super View Odoriko service between Totsuka and Ofuna stations

==== Formation ====
Super View Odoriko trains were operated with 251 series trains, with cars 1, 2 and 10 being double decker cars. Trains were formed as follows, with car 1 at the Izukyū-Shimoda end, and car 10 at the Tokyo and Shinjuku end.

251 series (10 cars)
Car No.	1	2	3	4	5	6	7	8	9	10
Numbering	KuRo 250	SaRo 251	MoHa 250	MoHa 251-100	MoHa 250-100	MoHa 251	MoHa 250	MoHa 251	SaHa 251	KuHa 251
Accommodation	Green, Observation deck	Green	Reserved	Reserved	Reserved	Reserved	Reserved	Reserved	Reserved	Reserved, Observation deck
Accommodation	Green Car exclusive lounge	Compartments	Reserved	Reserved	Reserved	Reserved	Reserved	Reserved	Reserved	Children's play area

=== Marine Express Odoriko ===
From 1 December 2012, seasonal Marine Express Odoriko (Japanese: マリンエクスプレス踊り子) services were introduced, running between Tokyo and Izukyū-Shimoda. The service normally consisted of one return journey at weekends only. JR East announced that from the start of the revised timetable on 14 March 2020, Marine Express Odoriko services would be discontinued as they were surplus to requirements.

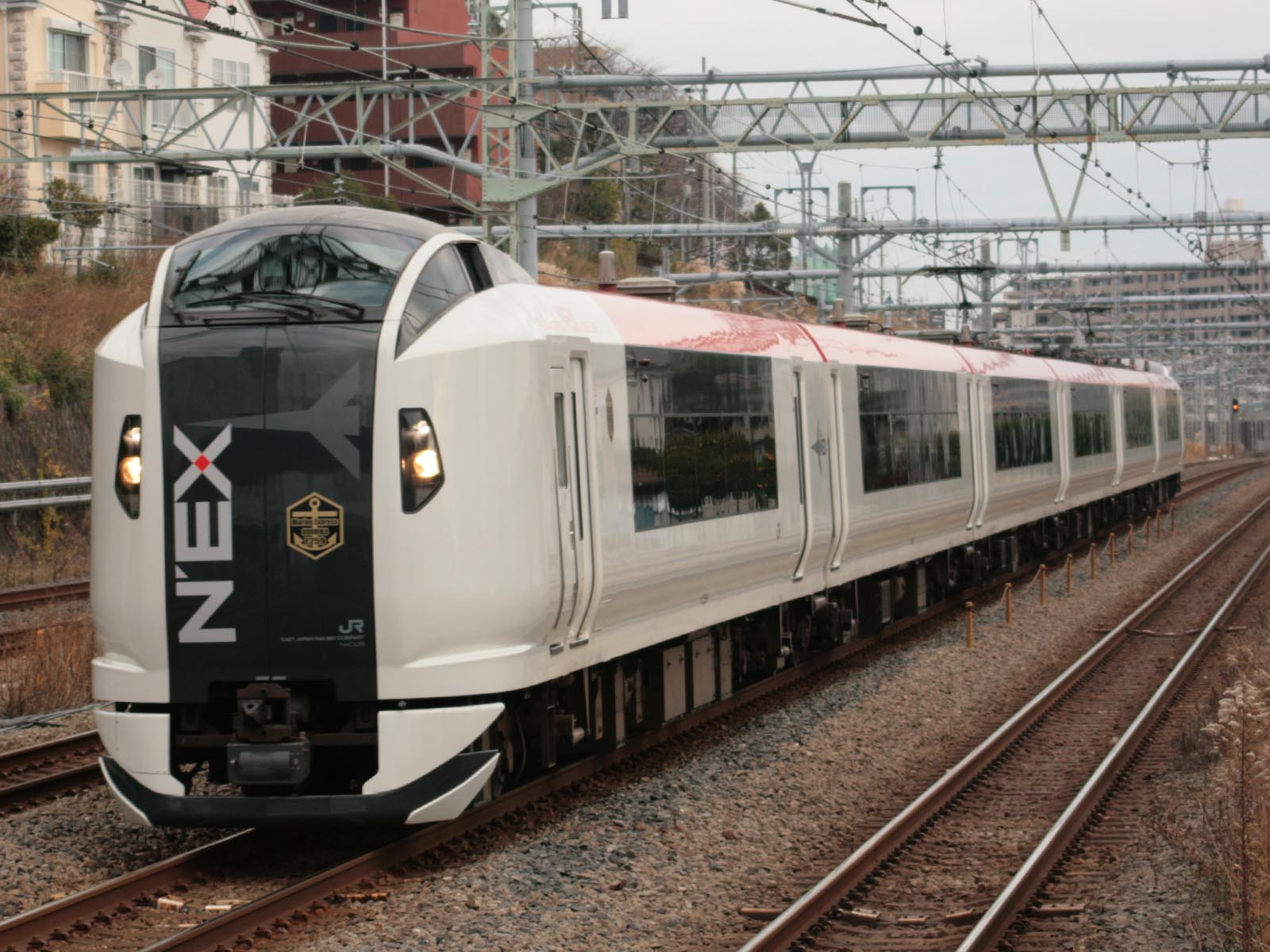
A JR East E259 series 6-car EMU on a special Marine Express Odoriko limited express service, passing Shin-koyasu Station on the Keihin-Tohoku Line

==== Stations served ====
Tokyo ー Izukyu-Shimoda:
Tokyo (Tokaido Line Platform) ー Yokohama ー Atami ー Ito ー Izu-Kogen ー Izu-Atagawa ー Izu-Inatori ー Kawazu ー Izukyu-Shimoda

==== Formation ====
Marine Express Odoriko services operated using E259 series 6-car EMUs normally used on Narita Express services. The formation is shown below, where car 1 at the Izukyū-Shimoda end, and car 6 at the Tokyo end.

E259 series (6 cars)
Car No.	1	2	3	4	5	6
Accommodation	Reserved	Reserved	Reserved	Reserved	Reserved	Green

== History ==
The limited express service was inaugurated on 1 October 1981 following the introduction of the then-new 185 series EMUs, replacing the earlier Amagi limited express and Izu express services from Tokyo to Izu.

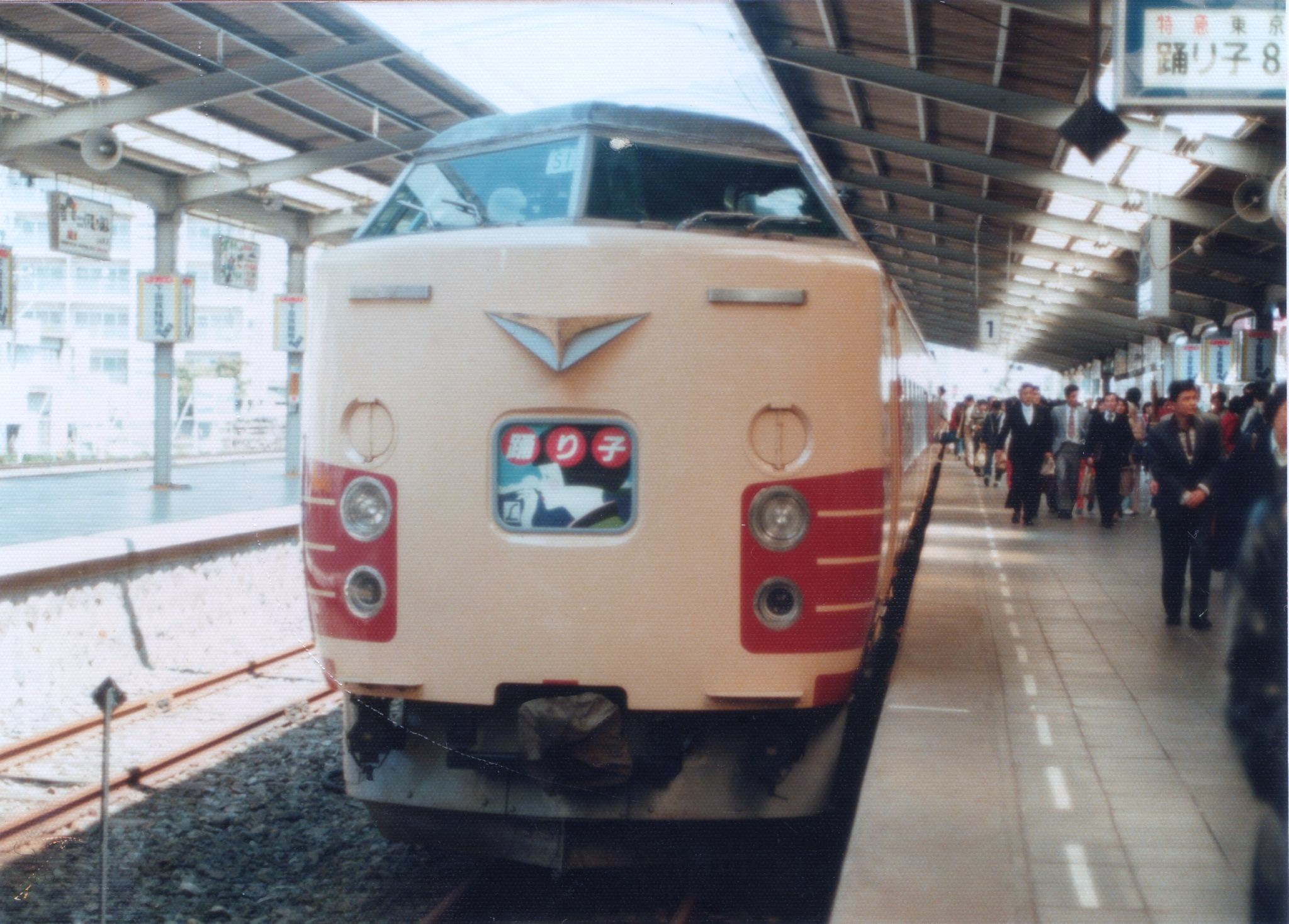
An Odoriko service in 1982 formed of a 183 series EMU

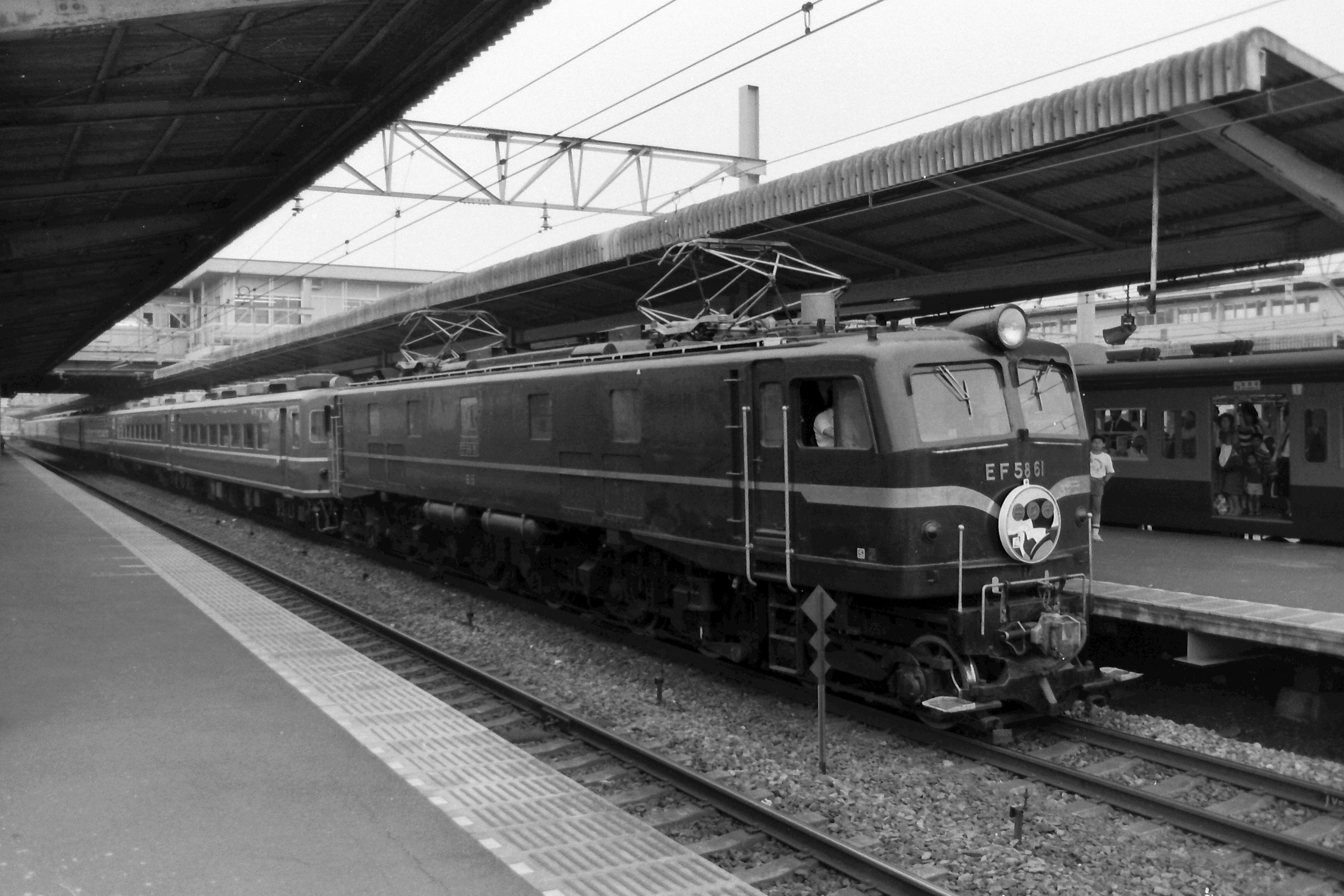
EF58 61 hauling the Limited Express Odoriko at Ofuna station

The Superview Odoriko operated from April 1990 until 13 March 2020. The Saphir Odoriko has been operating since 14 March 2020.

== Future development ==
The 185 series which ran in this service has been retired.

The 185 series has been replaced by new E257-2000 series trains that used to operate Azusa and Kaiji limited express services on the Chuo Main Line, and were themselves replaced by E353 series trains. The 185 series trains were completely withdrawn from use on Odoriko services on 12 March 2021.

JR East has also announced changes to the reserved seating on Odoriko services coinciding with the full retirement of 185 series EMUs from the service. Trains will now use LED seat reservation status indicators, rather than having dedicated non-reserved seat cars. This is the same system used by limited express services on the Chūō Line and Jōban Line. There will be two types of such supplementary tickets in the new system, namely the Reserved Seat Ticket (Japanese: 座席指定券, Japanese pronunciation: [Zaseki shitei ken]), and the Unreserved Seat Ticket (Japanese: 座席未指定券, Japanese pronunciation: [Zaseki mishitei ken]). The Unreserved Seat Ticket will replace Non-reserved Seat tickets (Japanese: 自由席券, Japanese pronunciation: [Jiyūseki ken]), which currently allow use of non-reserved cars.

The Reserved Seat Ticket enables a specified seat to be reserved for the holder. The reserved status for the seat is signified by a green overhead lamp on top of the corresponding seat.

The Unreserved Seat Ticket enables the holder to be seated on any unreserved seat. A red overhead lamp signifies that the seat is unreserved; while a yellow overhead lamp signifies that the seat is reserved for the later part of the journey, implying that one has to give up their seat to the passenger who has reserved the seat, when they board the train later.

Additionally, Tōkaidō Shinkansen passengers used to receive a discount if they transfer to an Odoriko service. This was discontinued in March 2021.

== Namesake ==
The word odoriko means dancing girl in Japanese. The train service was named after the title of novel Izu no Odoriko (The Dancing Girl of Izu) by Yasunari Kawabata. The setting of the novel is the destination of the train, Izu Peninsula.

There are numerous services operating between Tokyo and the Izu Peninsula, which have all been discontinued and become the Odoriko limited express today.

- Amagi「あまぎ」, named after Mount Amagi, the mountain at the center of the Izu Peninsula.
- Ikoi「いこい」, derived from the Japanese verb "ikou" (憩う, いこう), which literally means to relax and rest (In this case, relax in the local onsens at Izu).
- Izu「伊豆」, named after the Izu Peninsula, and also the former Izu Province.
- Ideyu「いでゆ」, meaning hot springs, which are prominent at Izu.
- Okuizu「おくいず」, referring to the inner part (i.e. the southern part) of Izu.
- Olympia「オリンピア」, referring to the Olympic Games.
- Jukkoku「十国」, named after the Jukkoku Pass, a ridge between Atami and Kannami. The pass is called "Jukkoku" (literally: 10 provinces), because from there, 10 provinces can actually be viewed, namely Sagami, Musashi, Awa, Kazusa, Shimosa, Suruga, Totomi, Shinano, Kai and Izu Provinces.
- Shonan-Nikko「湘南日光」, as this former service links the Shonan region to Nikko.
- Joban-Izu「常磐伊豆」, as this former service links Izu to the Joban region (Japanese: 常磐地域), which refers to the combined region of the former Hitachi Province (Japanese: 常陸国) and the Iwaki Province (Japanese: 磐城国), to Izu.
- Tachibana「たちばな」, Japanese for mandarin oranges, which is a major agricultural product at Izu.
- Chiyoda「ちよだ」, named after the Chiyoda district, where the Imperial Palace is located.
- Hatsushima「はつしま」, named after Hatsushima, an island 10 km east of Atami.

== See also ==
- List of named passenger trains of Japan
