= Izuhakone Railway Sunzu Line =

Railway line in Shizuoka prefecture, Japan

Sunzu Line
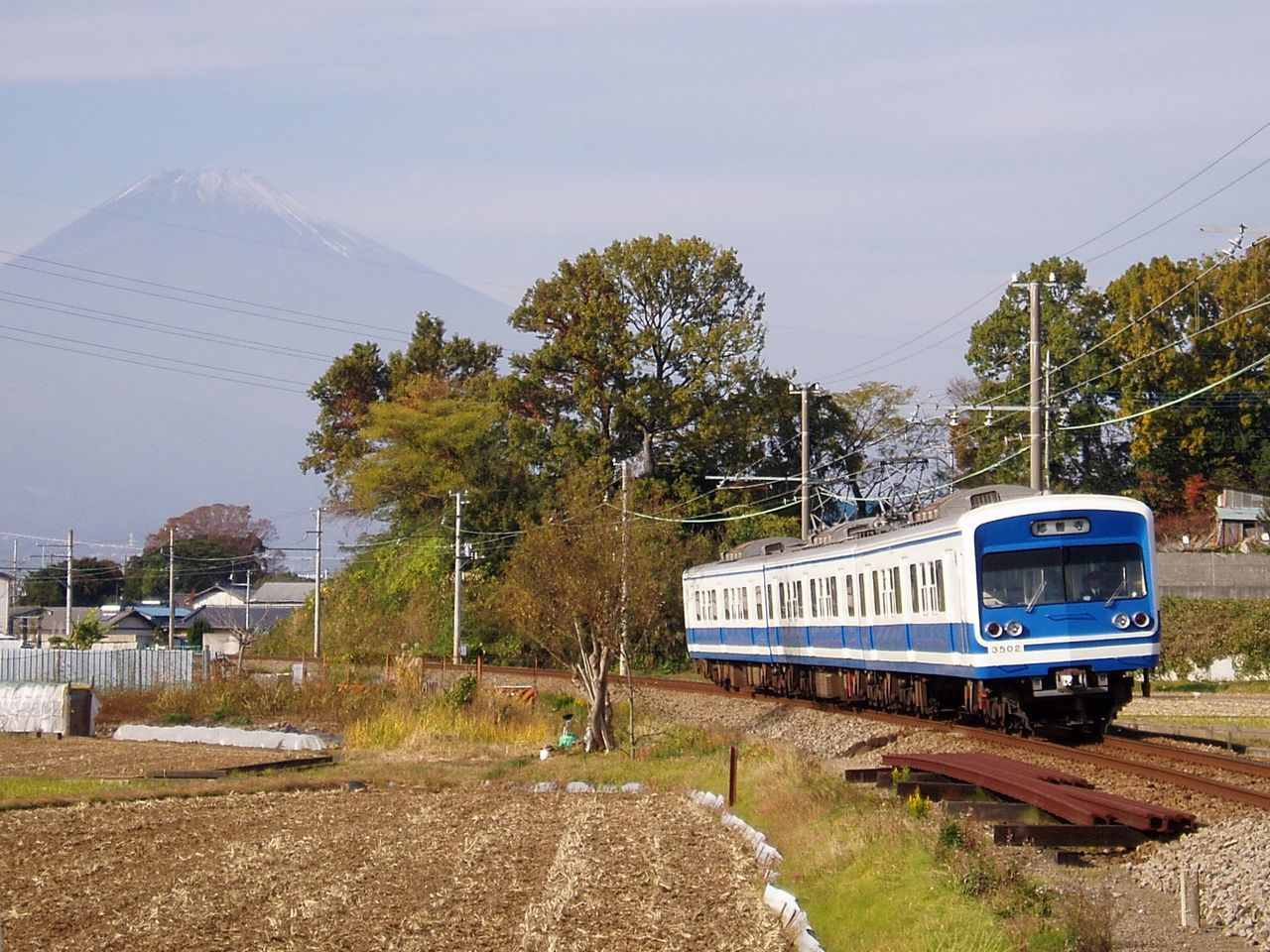
- 3000 series train on the Izuhakone Sunzu Line

Overview
- Owner: Izuhakone Railway
- Locale: Tokai region
- Termini: Mishima; Shuzenji
- Stations: 13

Service
- Type: Commuter rail

History
- Opened: 1898; 128 years ago

Technical
- Line length: 19.8 km (12.3 mi)
- Number of tracks: single
- Track gauge: 1,067 mm (3 ft 6 in)
- Electrification: 1,500 V DC overhead catenary

The Izuhakone Railway Sunzu Line (伊豆箱根鉄道駿豆線, Izuhakone Tetsudō Sunzu-sen) is a commuter railway line of the Izuhakone Railway, a private railroad in Japan. The line connects Mishima Station in the city of Mishima with Shuzenji Station in the city of Izu, both within Shizuoka Prefecture. The name "Sunzu" comes from the former provinces of Suruga and Izu, although the line at present operates only within the borders of former Izu Province.

== Stations ==
No.	Station	Japanese	Distance (km)	Between stations (km)	Ltd.Exp "Odoriko"	Transfers	Location	
IS01	Mishima	三島	0.0	-	●	Tōkaidō Main Line; Tōkaidō Shinkansen	Mishima	Shizuoka Prefecture
IS02	Mishima-Hirokōji	三島広小路	1.3	1.3	｜		Mishima	Shizuoka Prefecture
IS03	Mishima-Tamachi	三島田町	2.0	0.7	●		Mishima	Shizuoka Prefecture
IS04	Mishima-Futsukamachi	三島二日町	2.9	0.9	｜		Mishima	Shizuoka Prefecture
IS05	Daiba	大場	5.5	2.6	●		Mishima	Shizuoka Prefecture
IS06	Izu-Nitta	伊豆仁田	7.0	1.5	｜		Kannami	Shizuoka Prefecture
IS07	Baraki	原木駅	8.5	1.5	｜		Izunokuni	Shizuoka Prefecture
IS08	Nirayama	韮山	9.8	1.3	｜		Izunokuni	Shizuoka Prefecture
IS09	Izu-Nagaoka	伊豆長岡	11.4	1.6	●		Izunokuni	Shizuoka Prefecture
IS10	Takyō	田京	14.2	2.8	｜		Izunokuni	Shizuoka Prefecture
IS11	Ōhito	大仁	16.6	2.4	●		Izunokuni	Shizuoka Prefecture
IS12	Makinokō	牧之郷	18.6	2.0	｜		Izu	Shizuoka Prefecture
IS13	Shuzenji	修善寺	19.8	1.2	●		Izu	Shizuoka Prefecture

== Limited Express Odoriko ==
The Odoriko runs two services on weekdays and three services on holidays on the Sunzu Line. Previously using 185 series sets, E257-2000/2500 series trains were introduced by JR East in 2021. A limited express ticket is required to board the Odoriko.

== History ==
The Sunzu Line opened for operations on May 20, 1898, connecting Zuso-Mishima Station (present-day Mishima-Tamachi Station) with Nanjō Station (present-day Izu-Nagaoka Station). The terminus of the line was moved to Mishima Station (present-day Shimo-Togari Station) on June 15, 1898, and the southern end of the line was extended to Ōhito Station on July 17, 1899.

The line became part of the Izu Railway (伊豆鉄道, Izu Tetsudō) on July 19, 1907, which in turn became the Sunzu Electric Railway (駿豆電気鉄道, Sunzu Denki Tetsudō) on April 1, 1912. This company merged with Fuji Hydroelectric (富士水電) in 1914 and was spun back out as the Sunzu Railway (駿豆鉄道, Sunzu Tetsudō) on November 5, 1917. The line was electrified by June 1919, and the southern terminus extended to Shuzenji Station on August 1, 1924. In May 1933, regularly scheduled weekend services to Tokyo Station began operation but were later suspended during World War II. With the opening of the Tanna Tunnel in 1934 and the re-routing of the Tōkaidō Main Line, the Sunzu ceased operations at Shimotogari Station and its northern terminus became the new Mishima Station. A rail yard and train factory was completed at Daiba Station on June 10, 1937.

In 1949, the Japan National Railways began semi-express and limited-express train operations from Tokyo. The Sunzu Railway Company was acquired by the Izuhakone Railway on June 1, 1957. The line was upgraded from 600 V to 1,500 V on September 7, 1959. All freight operations were discontinued as of June 16, 1972. An ATS system was installed in December 1972 and a CTC system in 1985 (upgraded in 2007).
