= Izu-Nagaoka Station =

Railway station in Izunokuni, Shizuoka Prefecture, Japan

Izu-Nagaoka Station 伊豆長岡駅
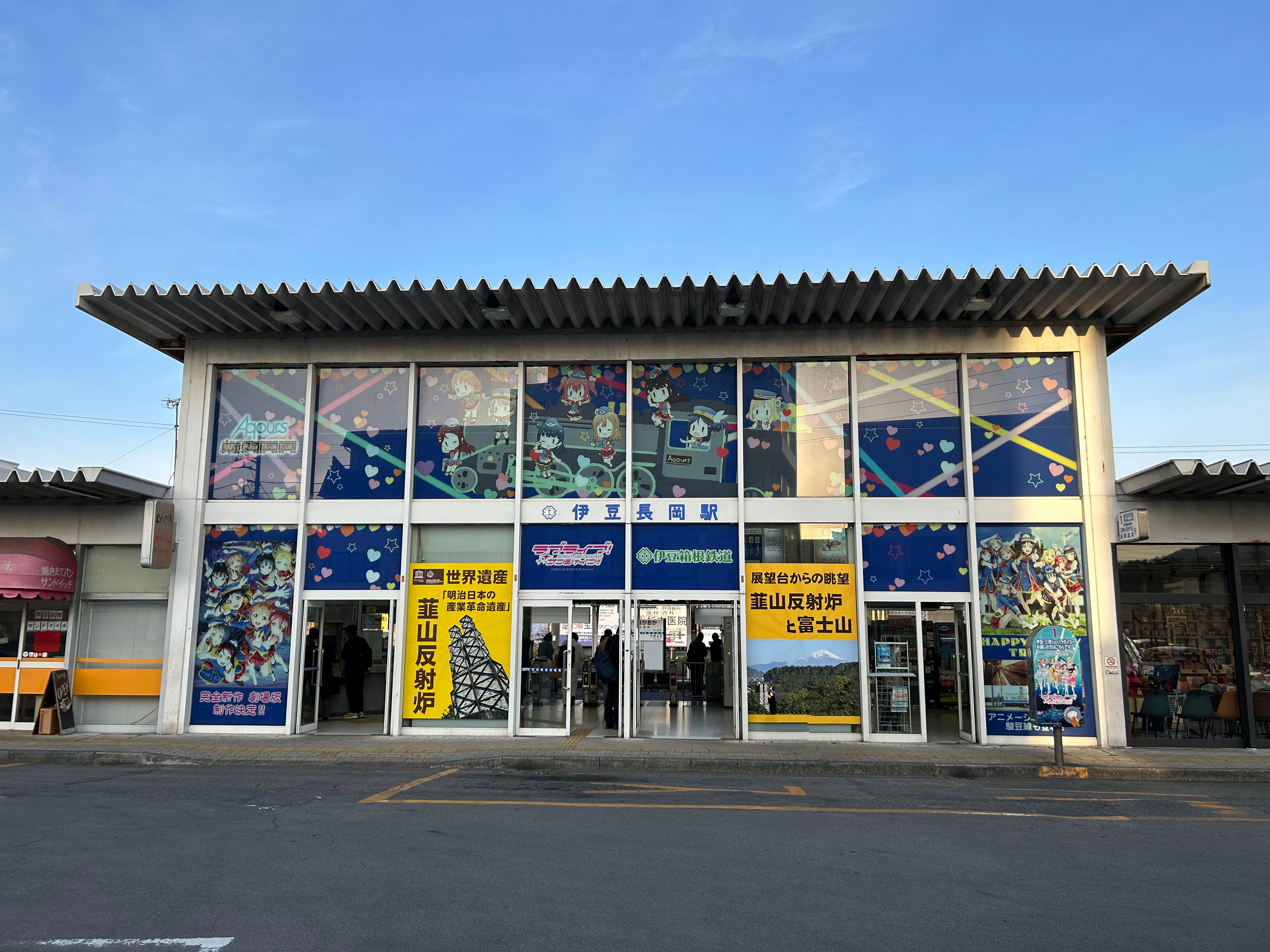
- Izu-Nagaoka Station in March 2023

General information
- Location: Nanjō 773-2, Izunokuni-shi, Shizuoka-ken; Japan
- Coordinates: 35°02′23.12″N 138°56′50.58″E
- Operator: Izuhakone Railway
- Line: Sunzu Line
- Distance: 11.4 km (7.1 mi) from Mishima
- Platforms: 1 side + 1 island platform
- Tracks: 3

Construction
- Structure type: At grade

Other information
- Status: Staffed
- Station code: IS09
- Website: Official website

History
- Opened: 20 May 1898; 128 years ago
- Former names: Nanjō (until 1919)

Passengers
- FY2017: 2,444 daily

Services
Preceding station	Izuhakone Railway	Following station
Takyō towards Shuzenji	Sunzu Line Local	Nirayama towards Mishima
Ōhito towards Shuzenji	Odoriko	Daiba towards Tokyo
Location
- Location within Shizuoka Prefecture Location within Central Japan Location within Japan

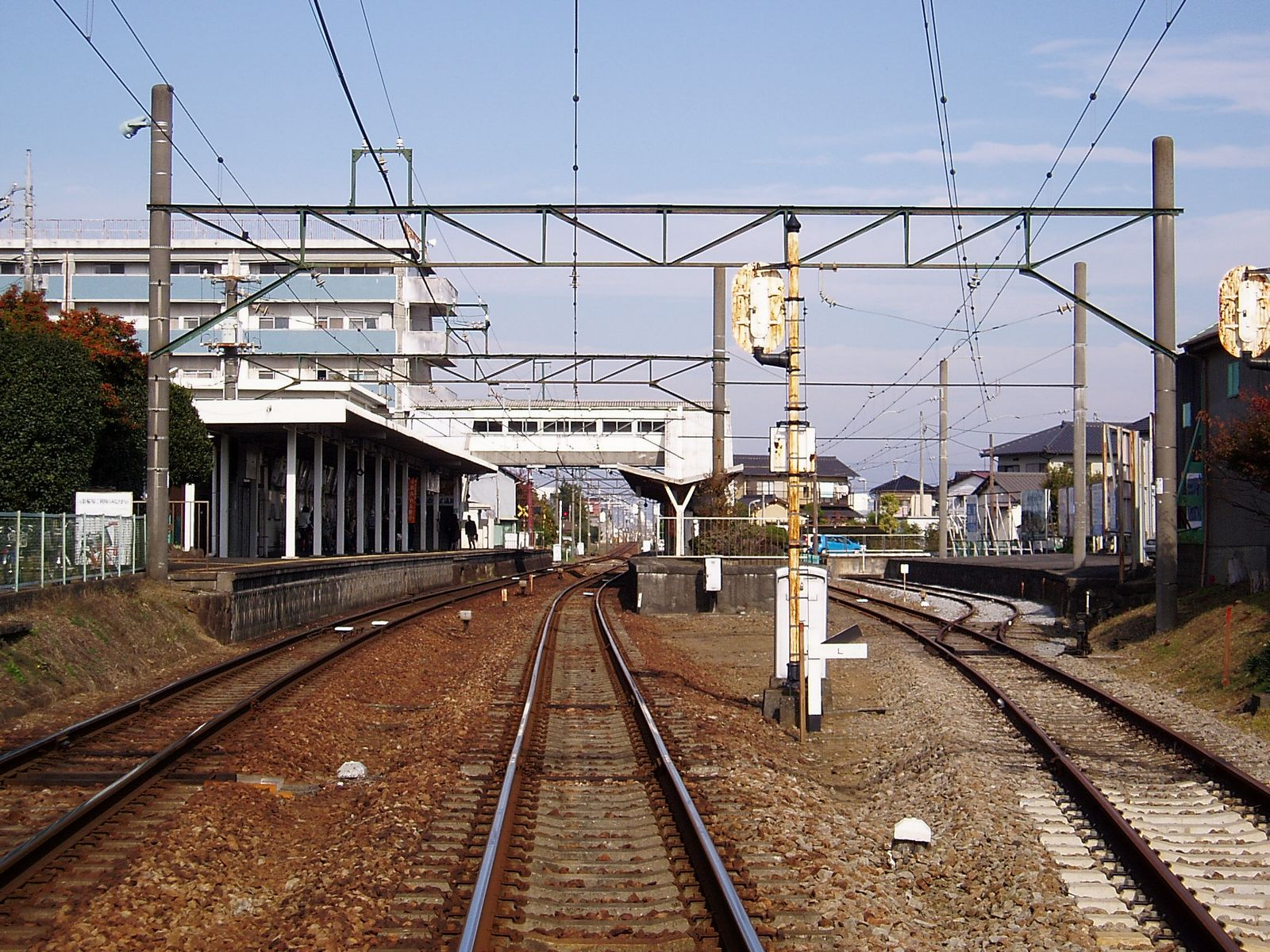
Platforms

Izu-Nagaoka Station (伊豆長岡駅, Izu-Nagaoka-eki) is a railway station located in the city of Izunokuni, Shizuoka Prefecture, Japan operated by the private railroad company Izuhakone Railway. It is located in the former town of Nirayama.

== Lines ==
Izu-Nagaoka Station is served by the Sunzu Line, and is located 11.4 kilometers from the starting point of the line at Mishima Station.

== Station layout ==
The station has one side platform and one island platform connected to the station building by a footbridge. However, only the island platform serving tracks 2 and 3 is in normal use for passenger traffic, and is used for bidirectional traffic for both normal and express services. The station building has automatic ticket machines, a staffed service counter and shops.

=== Platforms ===
1	■ Sunzu Line	For Ōhito and Shuzenji
2	■ Sunzu Line	For Ōhito and Shuzenji
3	■ Sunzu Line	Bidirectional (For Daiba, Mishima, Atami, Numazu, Fuji, Ōhito and Shuzenji)

== History ==
Izu-Nagaoka Station was opened on May 20, 1898 as Nanjō Station (南条駅, Nanjō -eki) as the terminal station for the first phase of construction of the Sunzu Line. The line was extended onwards to Ōhito on July 17, 1899. The station was given its present name on May 25, 1919. The station building was rebuilt in 1986.

== Passenger statistics ==
In fiscal 2017, the station was used by an average of 2444 passengers daily (boarding passengers only).

== Surrounding area ==
- Izu-Nagaoka onsen
- former Izu-Nagaoka Town Hall

== See also ==
- List of railway stations in Japan
