= Shuzenji Station =

Railway station in Izu, Shizuoka Prefecture, Japan

Shuzenji Station 修善寺駅
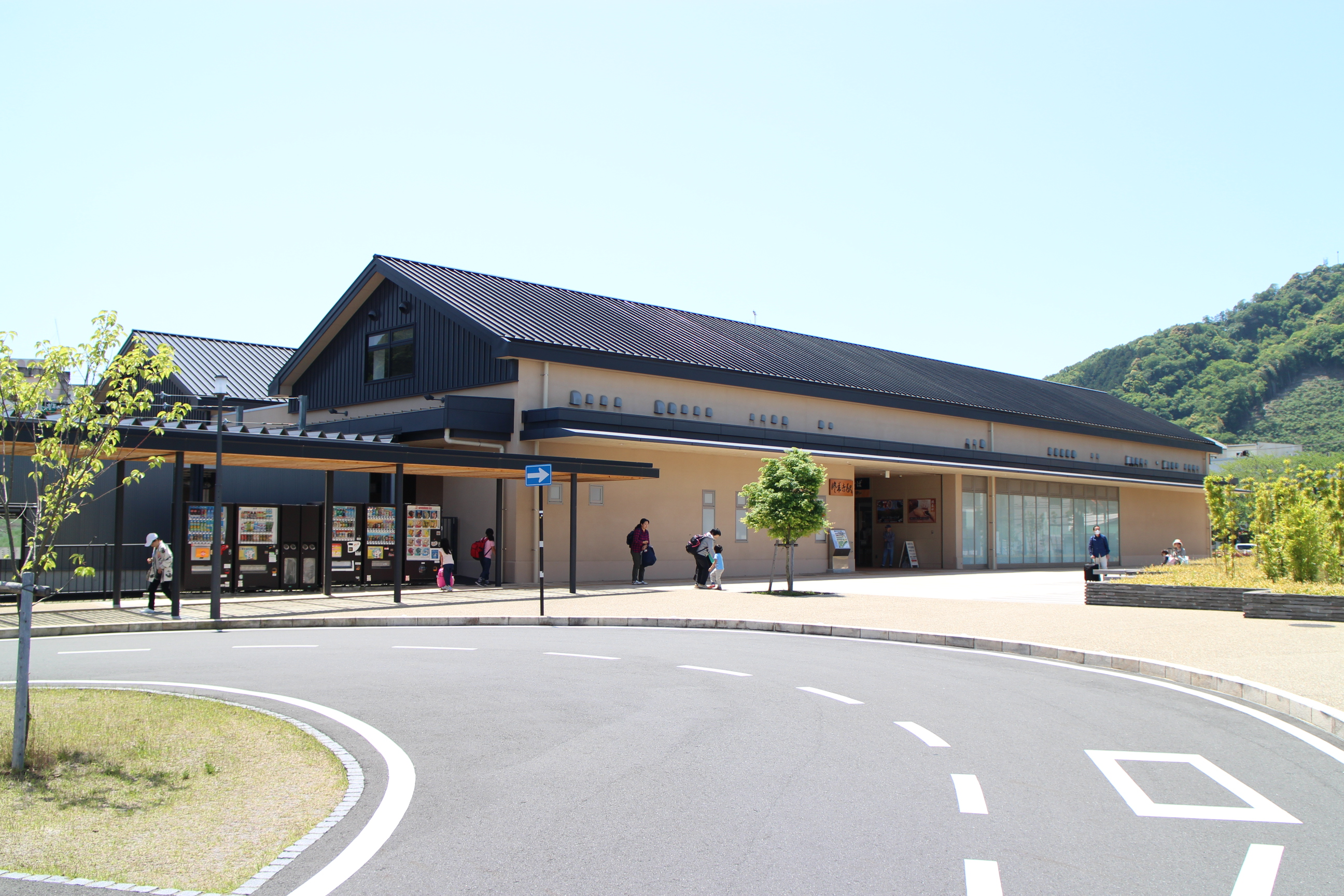
- Shuzenji Station in May 2016

General information
- Location: Kashiwakubo, Izu-shi, Shizuoka-ken; Japan
- Coordinates: 34.979092°N 138.950536°E
- Operator: Izuhakone Railway
- Line: Sunzu Line
- Distance: 19.8 km (12.3 mi) from Mishima
- Platforms: 3 bay platforms
- Tracks: 5

Construction
- Structure type: At grade

Other information
- Status: Staffed
- Station code: IS13
- Website: Official website

History
- Opened: 1 August 1924; 102 years ago

Passengers
- FY2017: 2,378 daily

Services
Preceding station	Izuhakone Railway	Following station
Terminus	Sunzu Line Local	Makinokō towards Mishima
Terminus	Odoriko	Ōhito towards Tokyo
Location
- Location within Shizuoka Prefecture Location within Central Japan Location within Japan

Shuzenji Station (修善寺駅, Shuzenji-eki) is a railway station located in the city of Izu, Shizuoka Prefecture, Japan operated by the private railroad company Izuhakone Railway.

== Lines ==
Shuzenji Station is the southern terminal station of the Sunzu Line, and is located 19.8 kilometers from the northern terminus of the line at Mishima Station.

== Station layout ==
The station has two island platforms serving four tracks. Tracks 1 and 2 are used for local service only; Tracks 3 and 4 are used for both local and limited express Odoriko services. The station building has both a staffed service counter and automatic ticket machines.

=== Platforms ===
1	■ Sunzu Line	For Izu-Nagaoka, Daiba, Mishima
2	■ Sunzu Line	For Izu-Nagaoka, Daiba, Mishima
3	■ Sunzu Line	For Izu-Nagaoka, Daiba, Mishima
4	■ Sunzu Line	For Izu-Nagaoka, Daiba, Mishima

== History ==
Shuzenji Station was opened on 1 August 1924 as part of the final extension of the Sunzu line from Ōhito.

== Passenger statistics ==
In fiscal 2017, the station was used by an average of 2378 passengers daily (boarding passengers only).

== Surrounding area ==
- Izu City Hall
- Shuzen-ji onsen
- Kano River

== See also ==
- List of railway stations in Japan
