= Mishima Station =

Railway station in Mishima, Shizuoka Prefecture, Japan

CA02 Mishima Station 三島駅
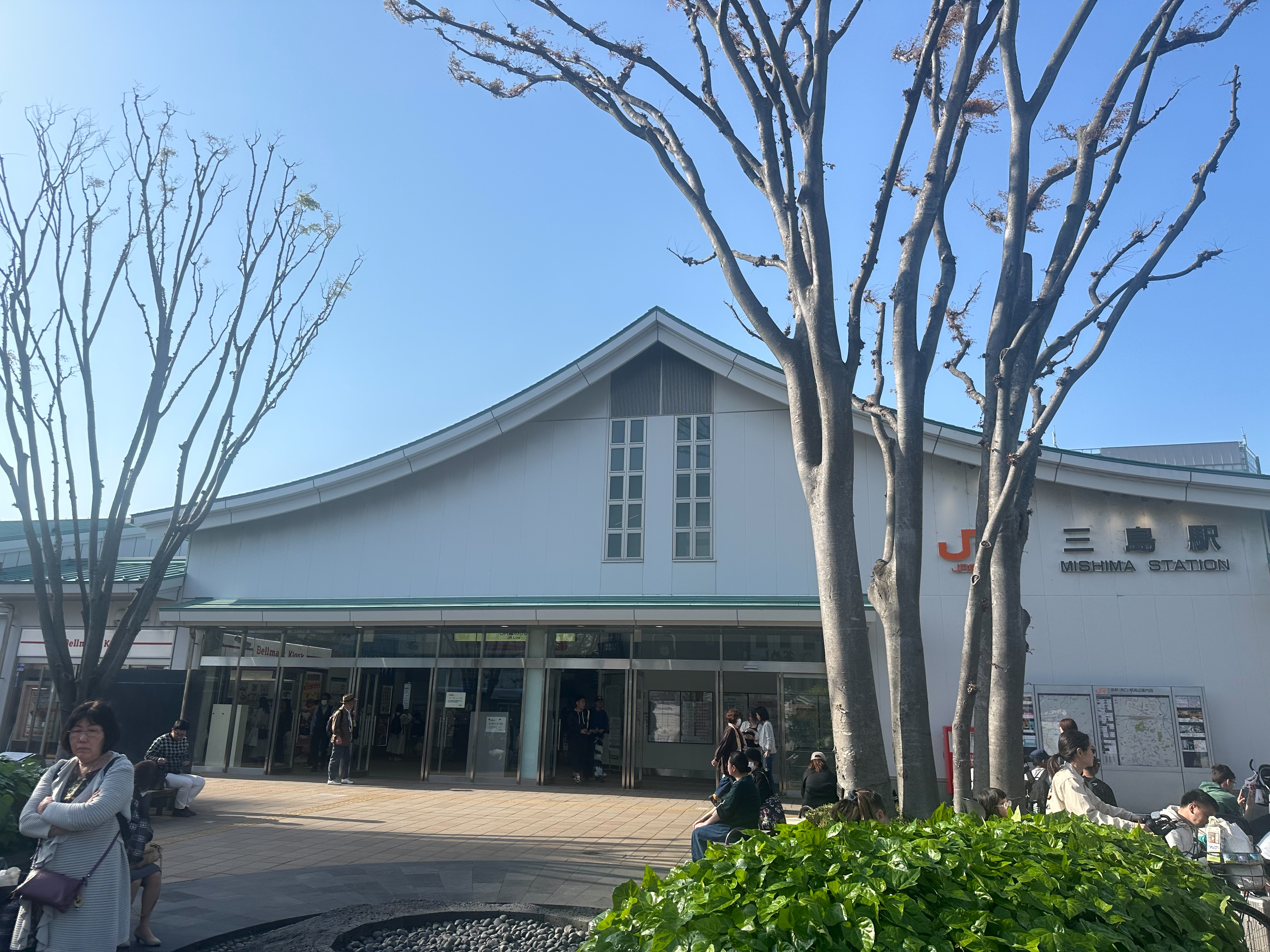
- South Entrance of JR Mishima Station in April 2024

General information
- Location: 16-1 Ichiban-chō, Mishima-shi, Shizuoka-ken; Japan
- Coordinates: 35°07′38″N 138°54′38″E
- Operator: JR Central; Izuhakone Railway
- Lines: Tōkaidō Shinkansen; Tōkaidō Main Line; Sunzu Line
- Distance: 120.7 km (75.0 mi) from Tokyo
- Platforms: 3 island, 1 side, 2 bay platforms
- Connections: Bus terminal

Other information
- Status: Staffed
- Station code: CA02, IS01
- Website: Official website

History
- Opened: December 1, 1934; 91 years ago

Passengers
- FY 2023: 55,538 daily (JR Central); 27,001 daily (Shinkansen)

Services
Preceding station	JR Central	Following station
Shizuoka towards Shin-Ōsaka	Tōkaidō Shinkansen Hikari (limited)	Atami towards Tokyo
Shin-Fuji towards Shin-Ōsaka	Tōkaidō Shinkansen Kodama	Atami towards Tokyo
Mishima-Tamachi towards Shuzenji	Odoriko	Atami CA00 towards Tokyo
Numazu CA03 towards Maibara	Tōkaidō Main Line Local	Kannami CA01 towards Atami
Preceding station	Izuhakone Railway	Following station
Mishima-Hirokōji towards Shuzenji	Sunzu Line Local	Terminus
Mishima-Tamachi towards Shuzenji	Sunzu Line Express	Terminus
Location
- Location within Shizuoka Prefecture Location within Japan

Mishima Station (三島駅, Mishima-eki) is a railway station in the city of Mishima, Shizuoka, Japan, operated by the Central Japan Railway Company (JR Central). It is also a union station with the Izuhakone Railway. The station was also a freight terminal of the Japan Freight Railway Company (JR Freight), although freight operations are now only on an occasional basis.

Japanese writer Yukio Mishima was given his pen name from this station, which his editors were passing through on the way to a meeting in Shuzenji, Shizuoka. ("Yukio" came from the Japanese word for 'snow', which the editors saw on Mount Fuji from the train.)

== Lines ==
Mishima Station is served by the JR Central Tōkaidō Shinkansen and Tōkaidō Main Line, and is located 120.7 kilometers from Tokyo Station. The station is also the northern terminus of the Izuhakone Railway Sunzu Line.

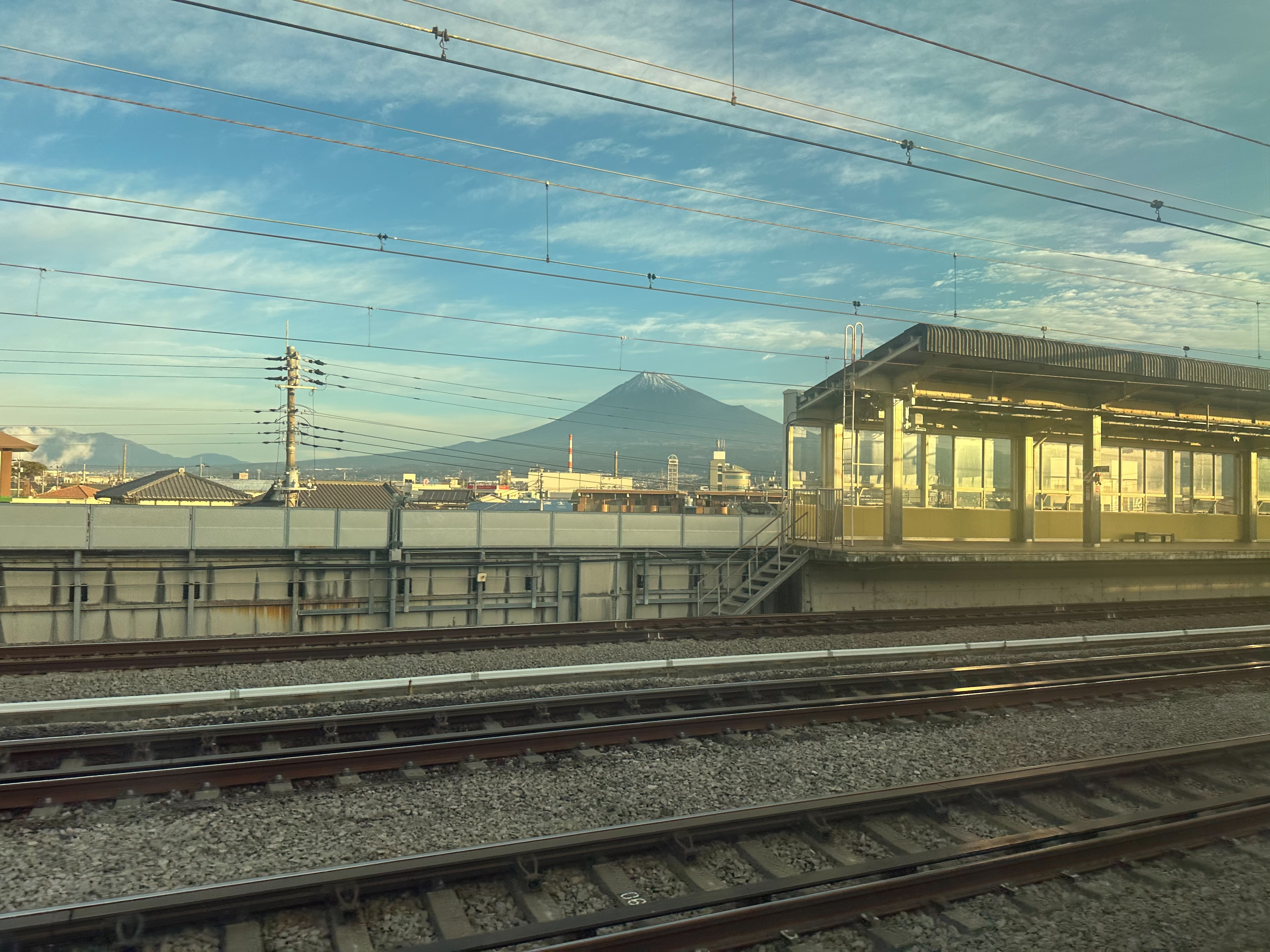
Mount Fuji seen from the platforms, 2024

== Station layout ==
JR Mishima Station has two island platforms serving tracks 1 to 4. Track 2 and Track 3 are the primary tracks for the Tōkaidō Main Line, with Tracks 1 and 4 used for through passage of express trains. The Tōkaidō Shinkansen uses Tracks 5 and 6, which are served by a separate island platform.

The adjacent Izuhakone Railway has one side platform and two bay platforms serving Tracks 7, 8 and 9. All platforms are connected by an underpass to a central concourse leading to the station building.

The station building has automated ticket machines, TOICA automated turnstiles, and a staffed ticket office.

=== Platforms ===
1	■ Izuhakone Railway Sunzu Line	for Daiba, Izu-Nagaoka, and Shuzenji
1	■ Tōkaidō Main Line	for Atami, Odawara, Yokohama, and Tokyo
2	■ Tōkaidō Main Line	for Numazu, Fuji, and Shizuoka
3	■ Tōkaidō Main Line	for Atami, Odawara, Yokohama, and Tokyo
4	■ Tōkaidō Main Line	for Numazu, Fuji, and Shizuoka
5	■ Tōkaidō Shinkansen	for Nagoya and Shin-Osaka
6	■ Tōkaidō Shinkansen	for Shin-Yokohama and Tokyo

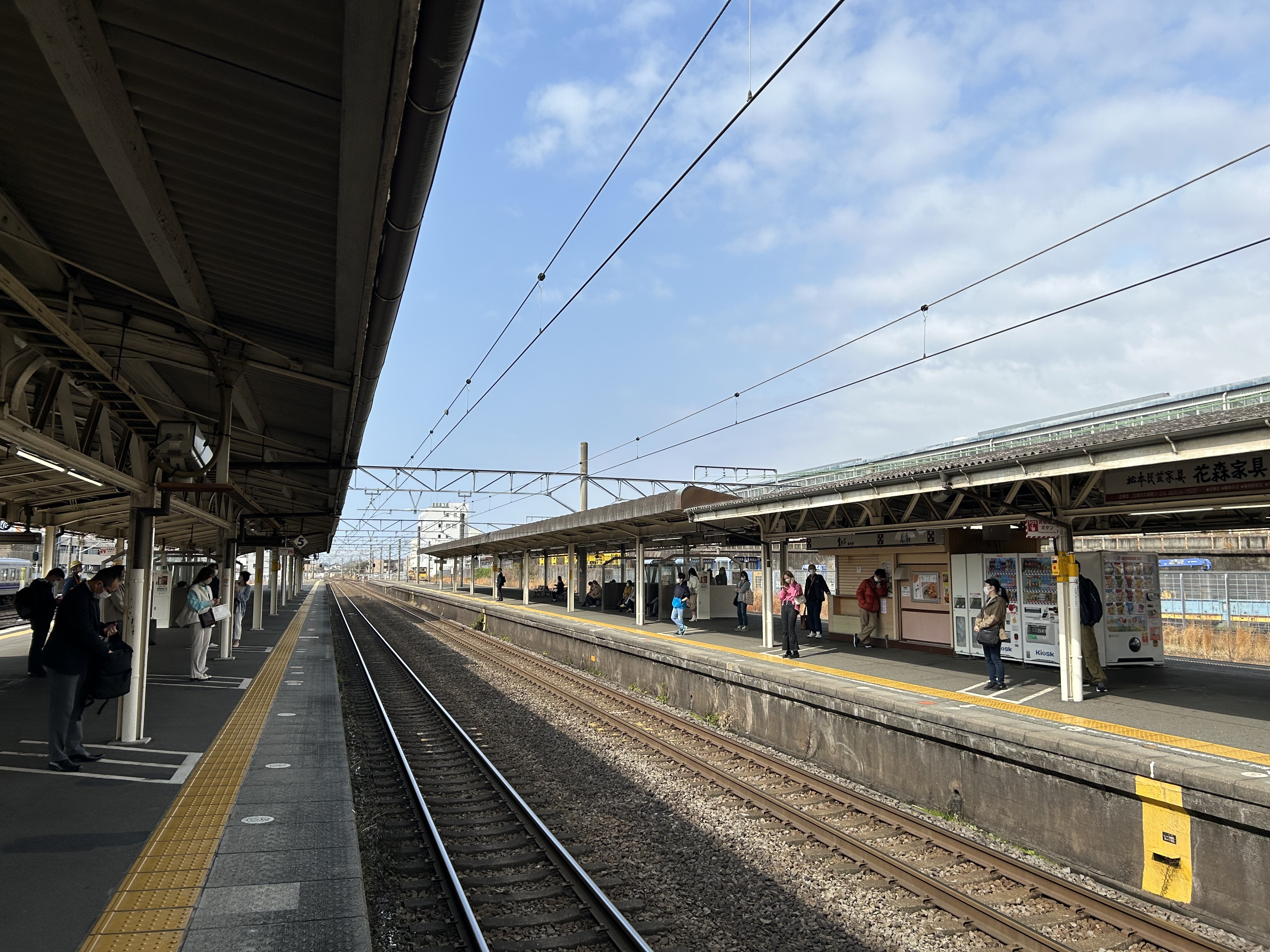
Tokaido Main Line platforms

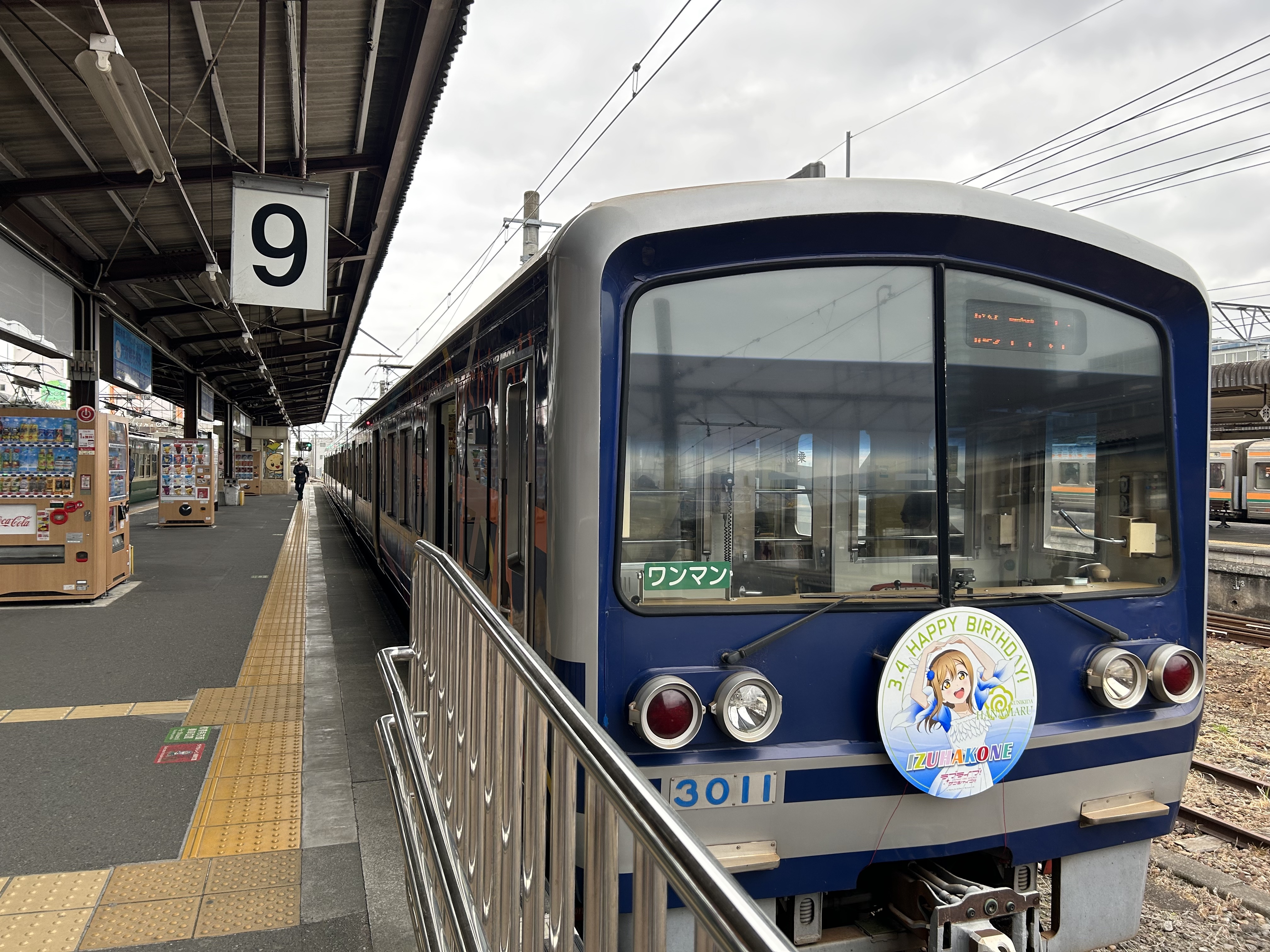
Izuhakone Railway Sunzu Line platform

== History ==
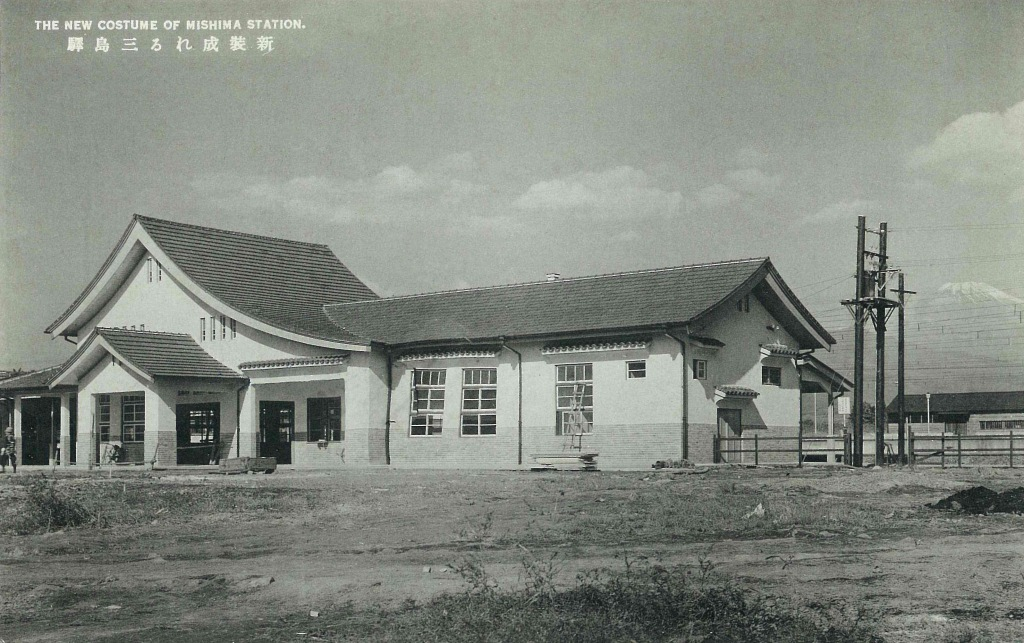
Mishima Station shortly after completion in 1934

The original Mishima Station was opened on 15 June 1896 in the town of Nagaizumi. However, with the completion of the Tanna Tunnel between Atami and Numazu, this station was renamed Shimo-Togari Station, and a new Mishima Station was opened at its present location on December 1, 1934. The terminus of the Izuhakone Railway was also relocated to Mishima Station at this time. On April 25, 1969, Tōkaidō Shinkansen services began serving Mishima Station. Regularly scheduled freight service was discontinued in 1974, however, private freight services to the Toray Industries Mishima plant continued on a spur line until 2007. In 2008, Mishima Station was extensively remodeled, and an ASTY shopping complex was opened at the station.

Station numbering was introduced to the section of the Tōkaidō Line operated JR Central in March 2018; Mishima Station was assigned station number CA02.

== Passenger statistics ==
In fiscal 2017, the JR portion of the station was used by an average of 30,859 passengers daily (boarding passengers only) and the Izuhakone portion of the station was used by 8,599 passengers daily (boarding passengers only).

== Accidents ==
On 27 December 1995, the first and so far only fatality caused by the Tōkaidō Shinkansen occurred at Mishima Station when Yusuke Kawarazaki, a 17-year-old high school student, died after his finger was caught in a closing car door while he was attempting to board a 0 Series train that was about to depart. He was dragged down the platform by the train and suffered a fatal head injury after falling from it.

== Surrounding area ==
=== South side ===
- Mishima City Office

=== North side ===
- Mishima Tax Office

=== Bus routes ===
- Tokai Bus Orange Shuttle
  - For Moto-Hakone Port

== See also ==
- List of railway stations in Japan
