= Mombetsu Municipal Museum =

Museum in Monbetsu, Hokkaido, Japan

- 紋別市立博物館
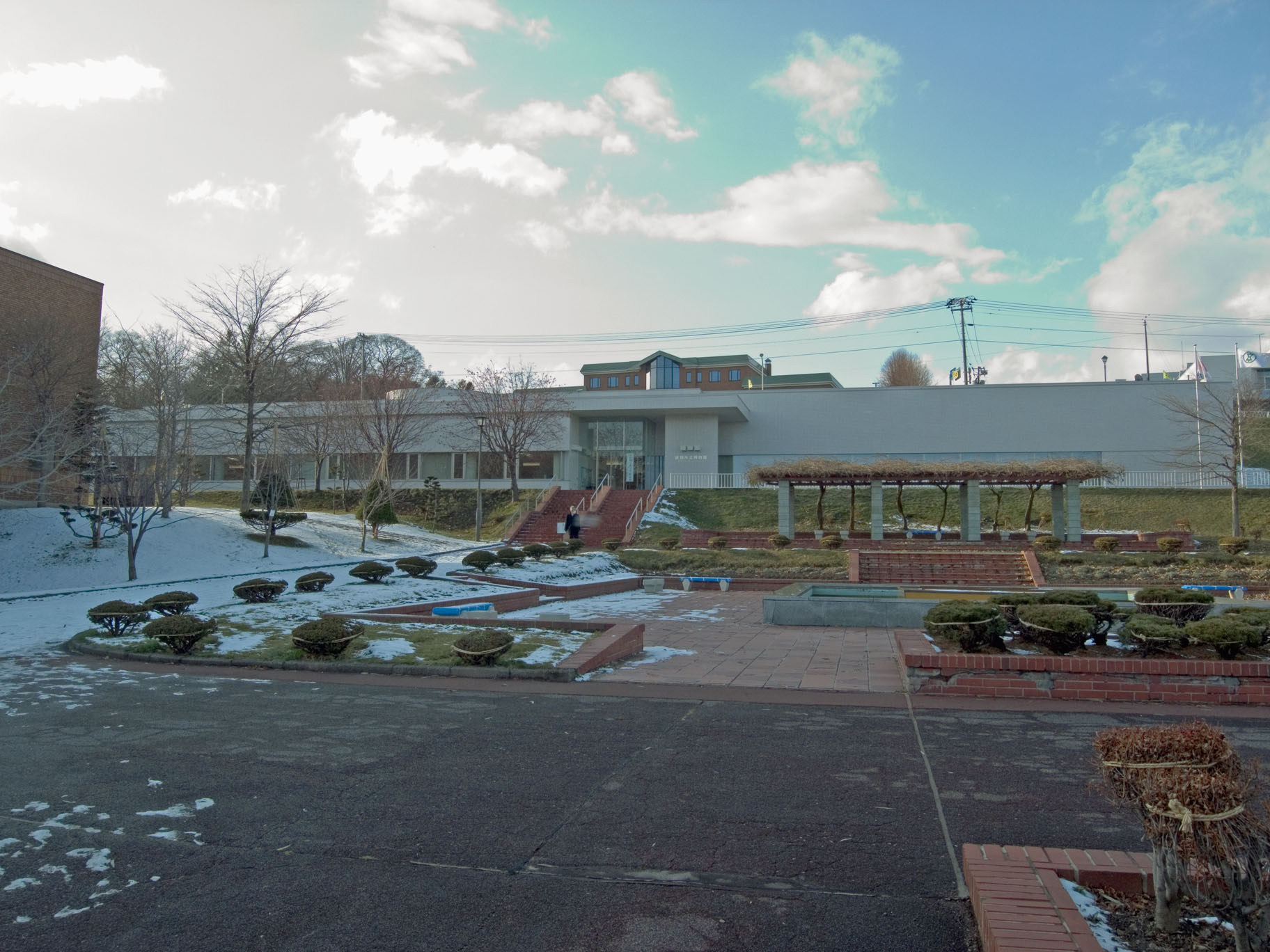
- Interactive map of the Mombetsu Municipal Museum area

General information
- Location: 3-1-4 Saiwai-chō, Monbetsu, Hokkaido, Japan
- Coordinates: 44°21′20″N 143°21′11″E
- Opened: 13 April 2002

Website
- Official website (ja)

Mombetsu Municipal Museum (紋別市立博物館, Monbetsu Shiritsu Hakubutsukan) opened in Monbetsu, Hokkaido, Japan in 2002. The displays document the area's natural history and history, with a thematic emphasis on the coast (fishing), hills (agriculture and forestry), and mountains (mining).

== See also ==
- Konomai gold mine
