= Konomai gold mine =

Mine in Japan

Coordinates: 44°08′05″N 143°20′55″E

The Konomai Mines (鴻之舞 鉱山, Kōnomai kōzan) are located 30 km south of Monbetsu, Abashiri Subprefecture, Hokkaidō, Japan (44° 23' North : 143° 22' East). The discovery was made in 1915. From then until 1973 when the mine was closed, 73 tons of gold and 1200 tons of silver were produced by the Sumitomo group.

It was one of the richest gold mines in Japan and referred to as "the biggest goldmine in the Orient". At its peak in the 1940s, 13,000 miners, their families, and attendant merchants lived in the area.

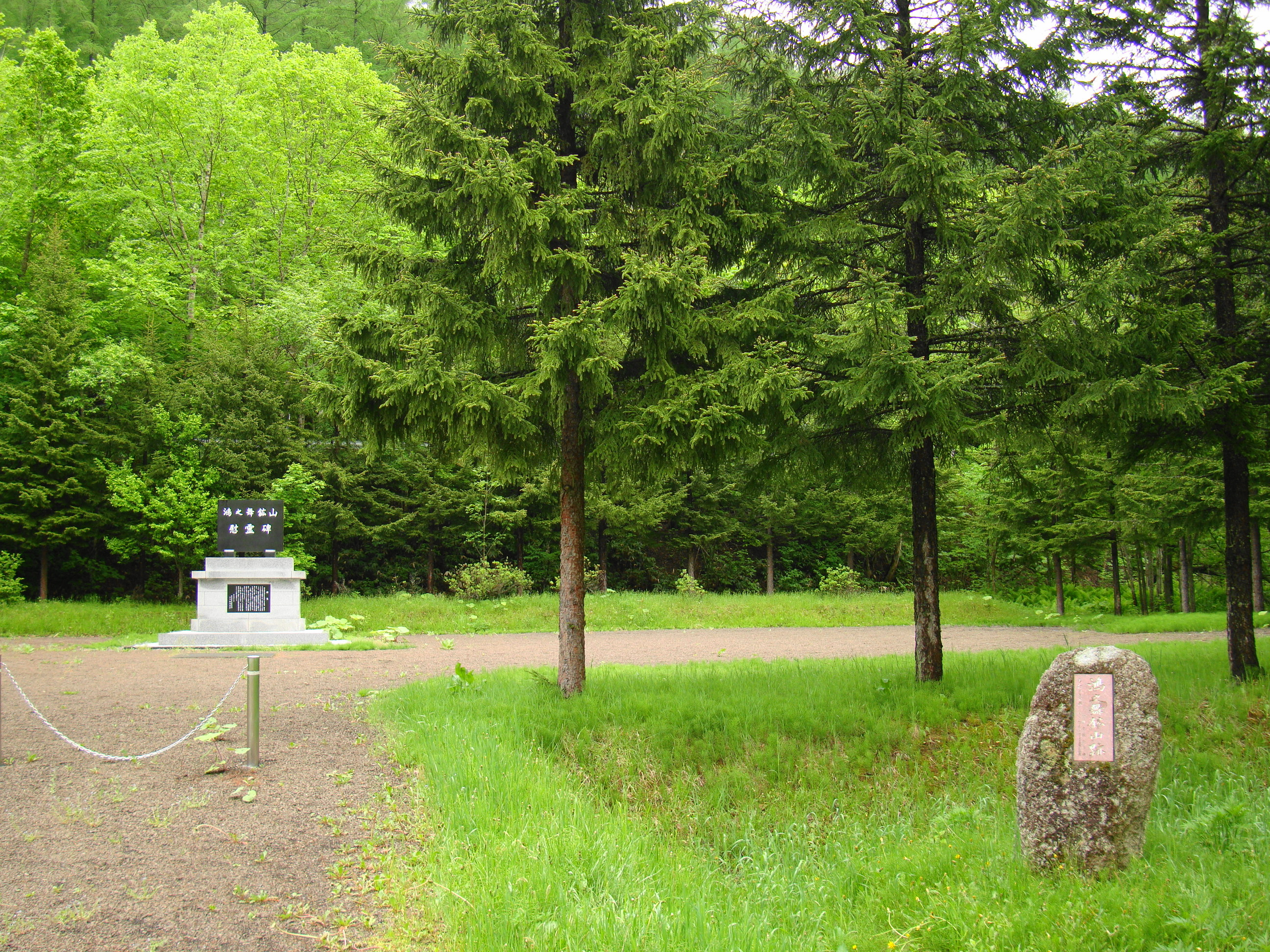
Right: The monument of Konomai
Left: The cenotaph for the victims of mining accidents

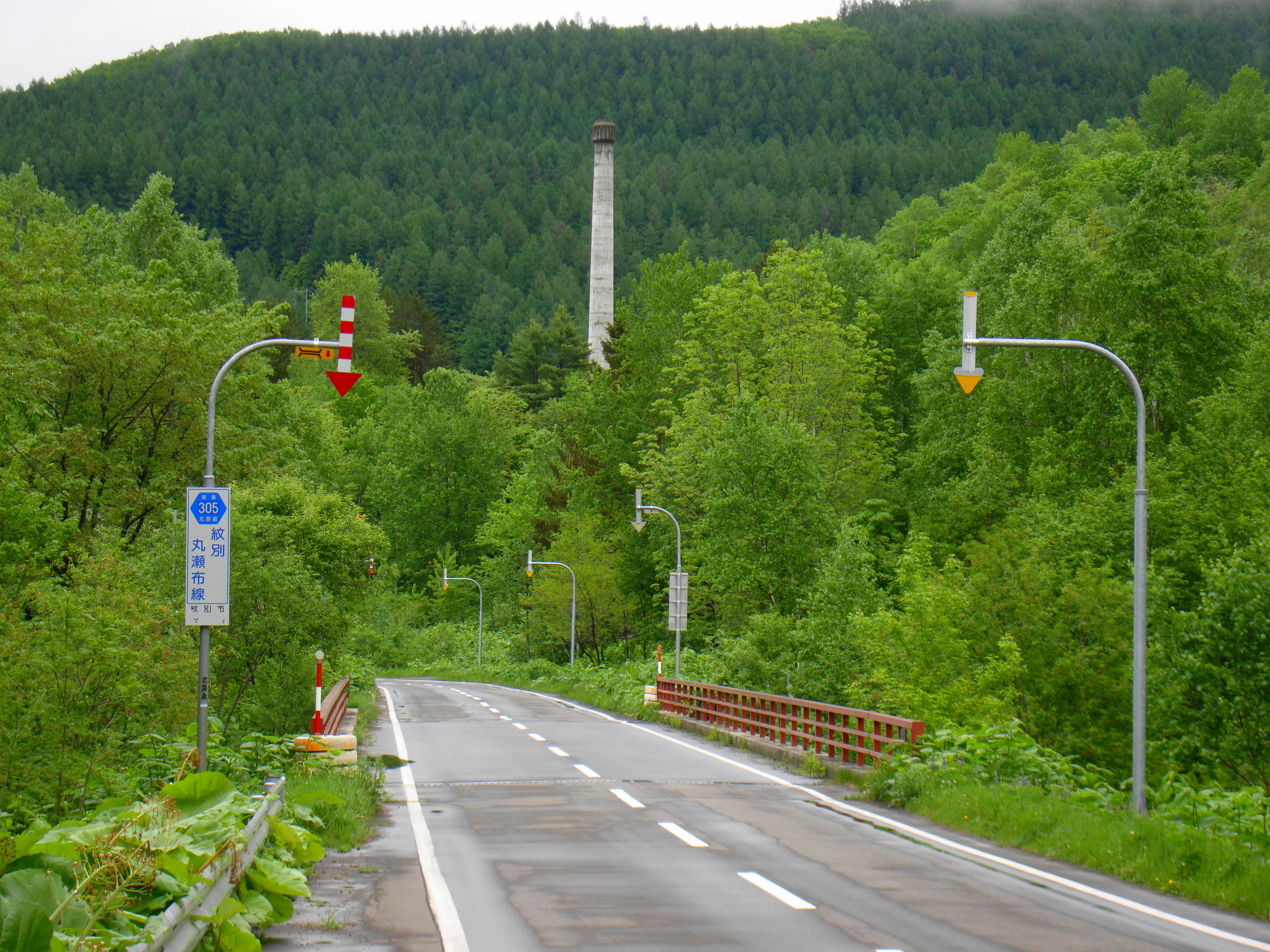
The chimney of the old refinery, visible from Prefectural Route 305

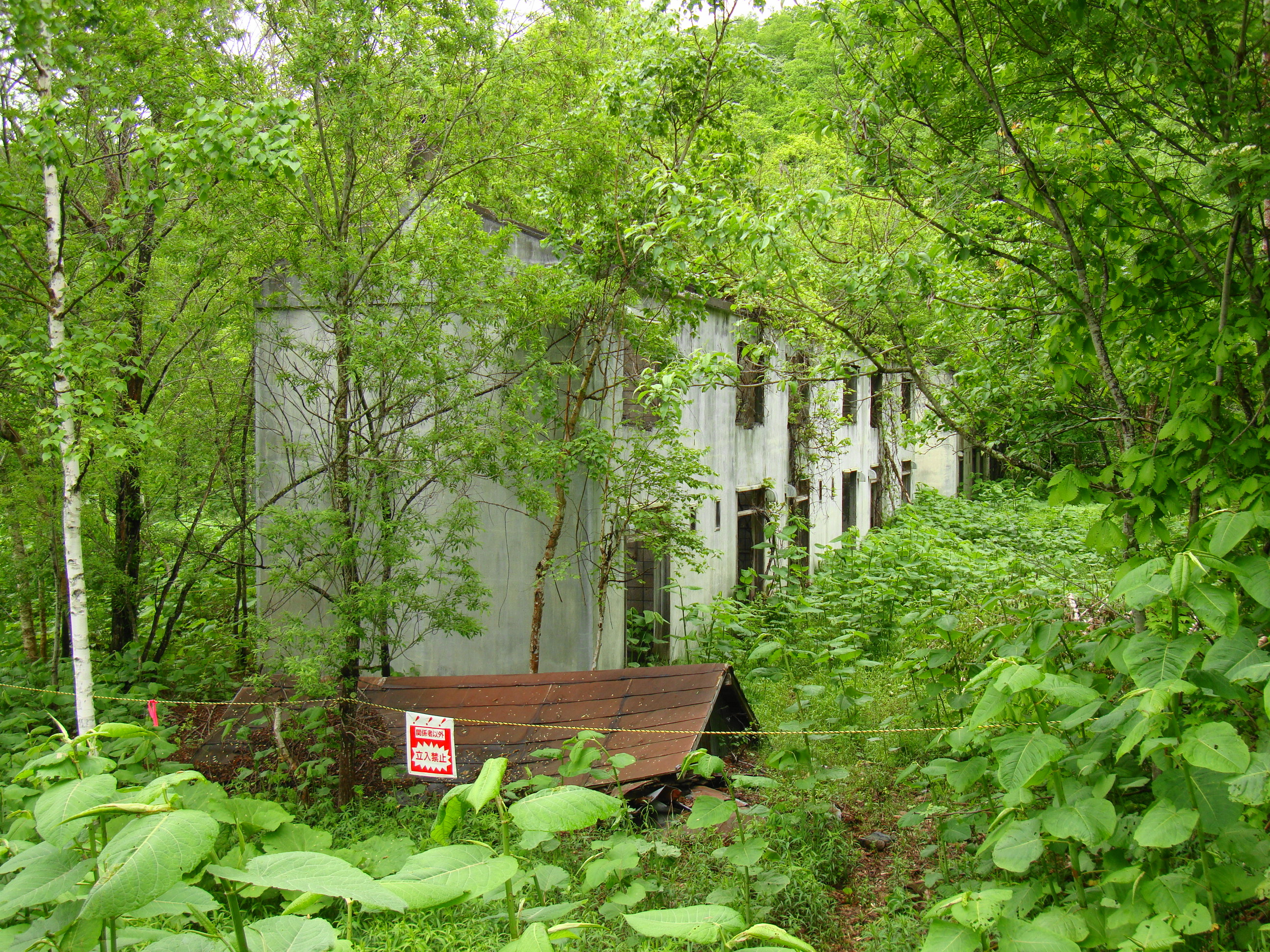
Ruin of Konomai

== See also ==
- Toi Gold Museum
- Toi gold mine
- Japanese mining and energy resources (World War II)
