= Toi Gold Museum =

Museum on gold mining in Izu, Japan

- 土肥黄金館
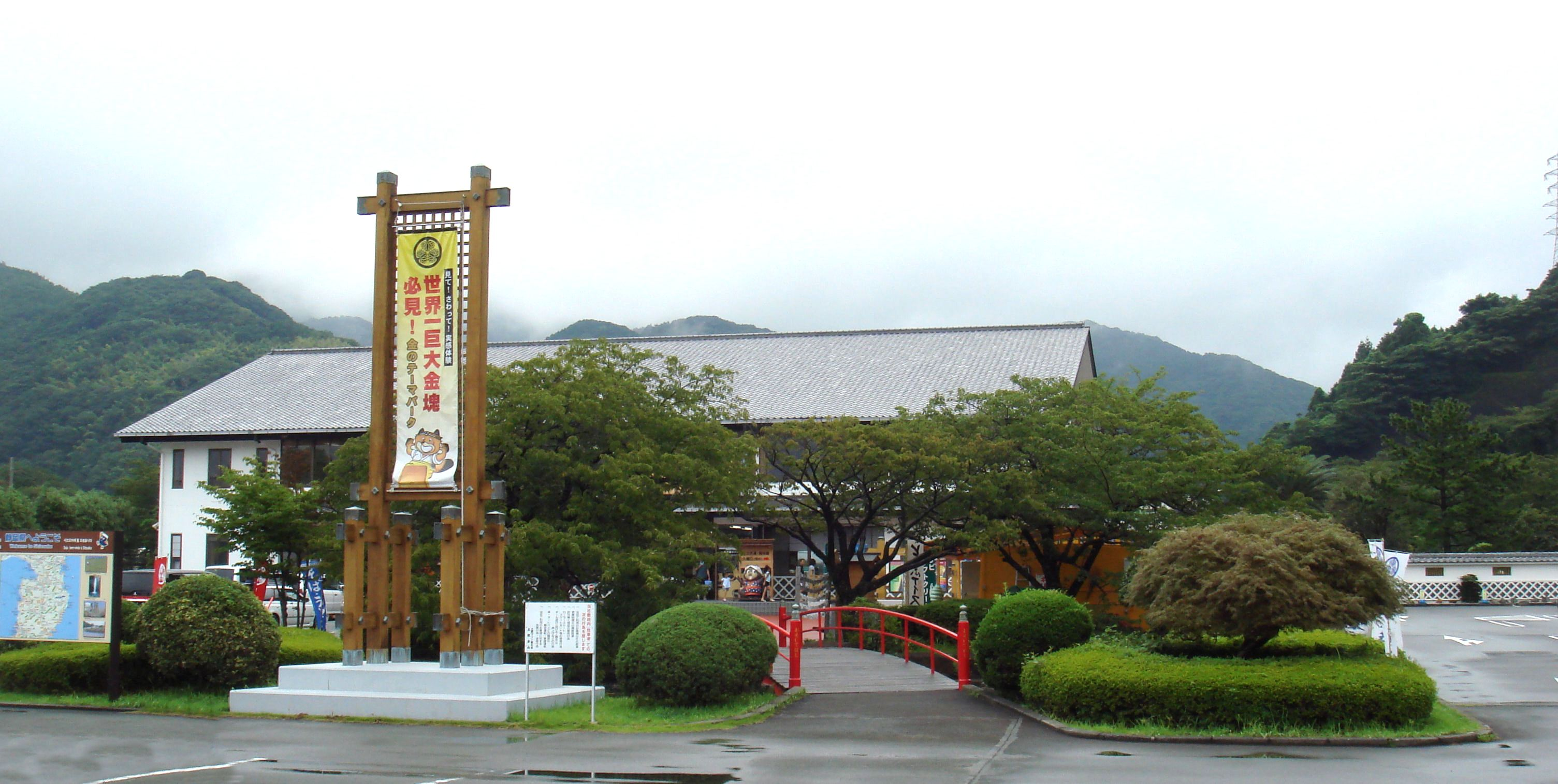
- Entrance building to the Toi Gold Museum
- Interactive map of the Toi Gold Museum area

General information
- Location: 2726 Toi, Izu, Shizuoka Prefecture, Japan
- Coordinates: 34.908257°N 138.792920°E

Website
- www.toikinzan.com/view/

The Toi Gold Museum (土肥黄金館, Toi Kinzokukan) is a museum on the subject of gold mining in ancient and modern Japan, which is located next to the Toi gold mine in the city of Izu, Shizuoka, Japan.

== Museum ==
The museum displays reconstitutions of the manufacturing process for gold during the Tokugawa period, ancient artifacts from the period, explanatory exhibitions about gold processing, and an exhibit of various gold ores from various places throughout Japan.

The museum received some fame for housing the world's largest gold bar, weighing 250 kilograms (8,000 ozt), and representing a 2016 value of about 1.1 billion yen (US$9.7 million). It has a fineness of 99.99%. The bar obtained an official Guinness record certificate for "The largest manufactured pure gold bar":

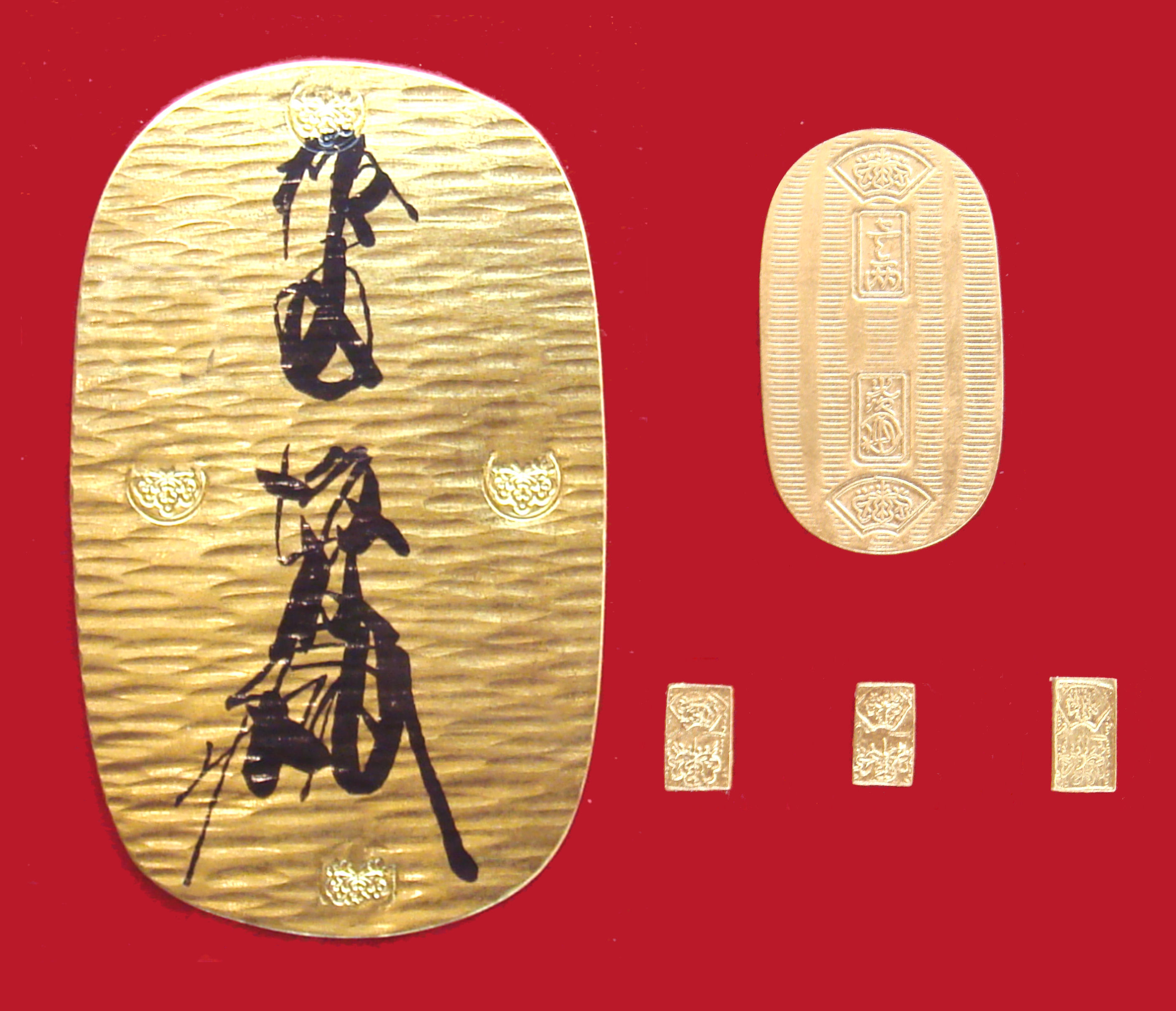
Tokugawa coinage

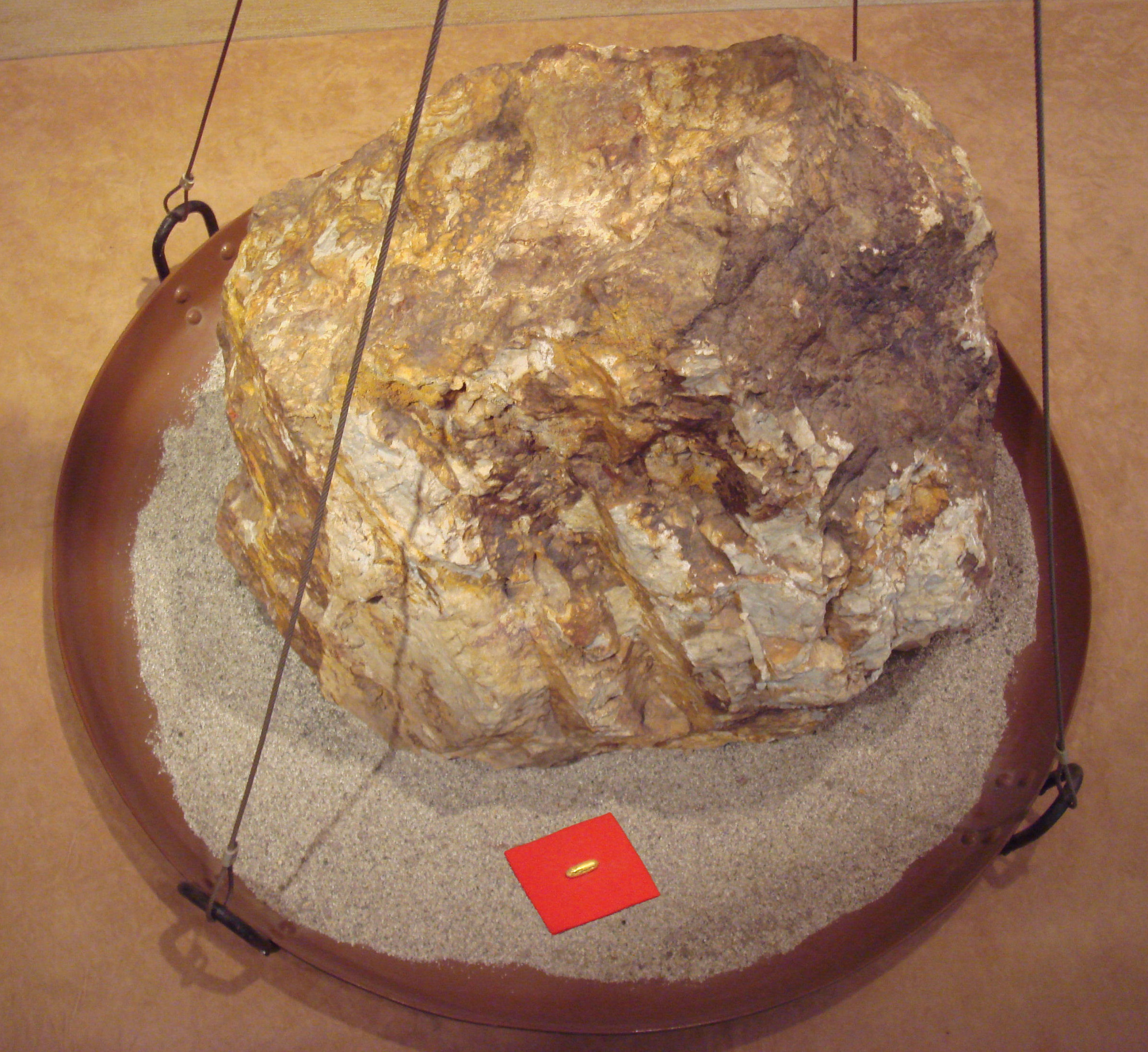
Relative sizes of an 860-kilogram (1,900 lb) rock ore, and the 30 grams (1.1 oz) of gold that can be extracted from it

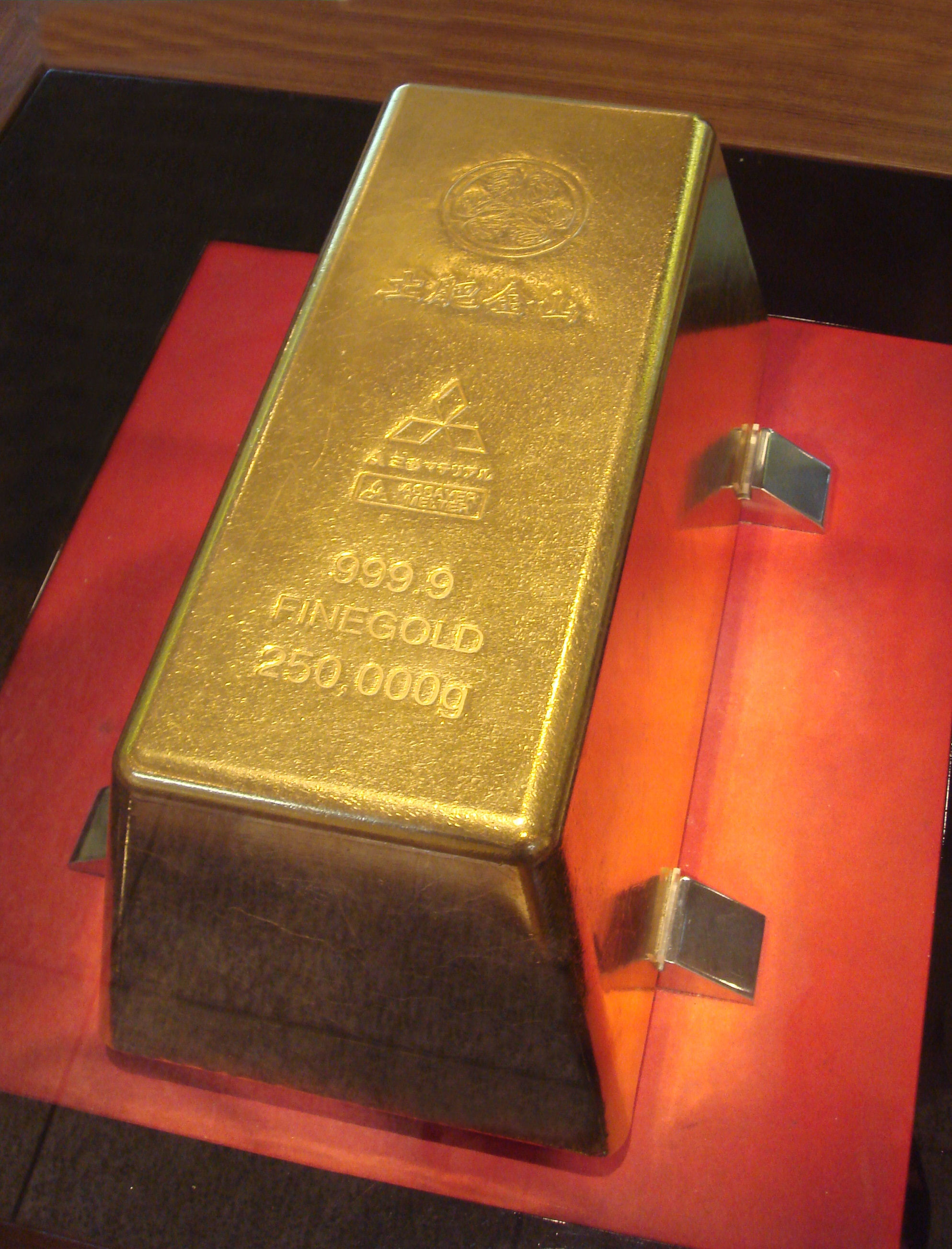
The world's largest gold bar, at 250 kg, can be seen and touched

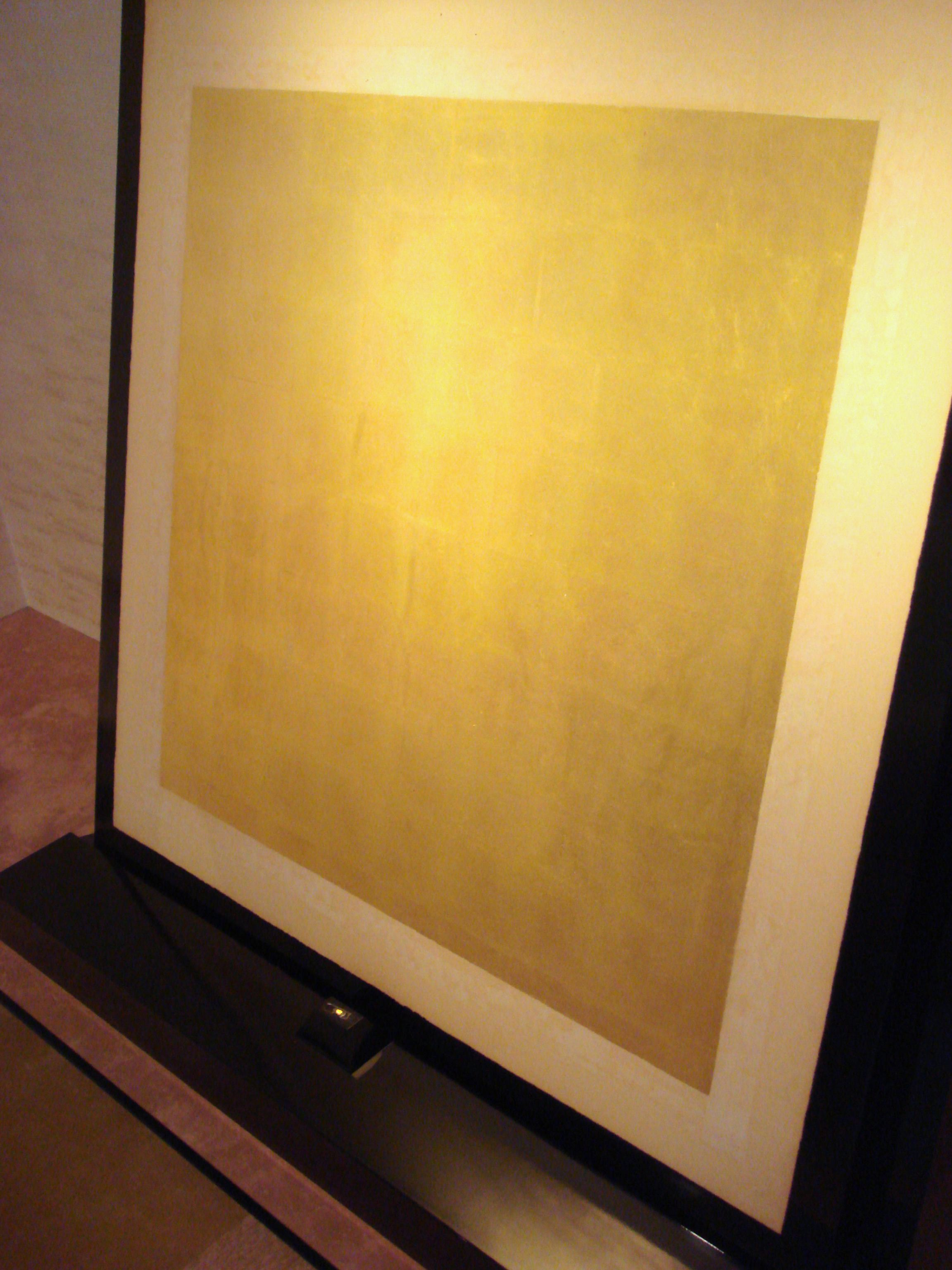
Explanations about gold foil
